= List of civil parishes in Herefordshire =

This is a list of civil parishes in the ceremonial county of Herefordshire, England. There are 235 civil parishes. The whole of the county is parished.

Population figures are unavailable for some of the smallest parishes.

Since the 2011 census: Ross Rural was merged into the Ross-on-Wye civil parish on 1 April 2015 and on the 1st of April 2019 the parishes of Kenderchurch, St Devereux, Treville and Wormbridge were merged with Kilpeck.

Civil Parish	Civil Parish Population 2011	Area (km^{2}) 2011	Pre 1974 District
Abbey Dore	385	27.02	Dore and Bredwardine Rural District
Aconbury			Hereford Rural District
Acton Beauchamp	229	10.16	Bromyard Rural District
Adforton	128	6.44	Leominster and Wigmore Rural District
Allensmore	566	8.37	Hereford Rural District
Almeley	601	13.96	Weobley Rural District
Ashperton	226	5.43	Ledbury Rural District
Aston Ingham	398	9.10	Ross and Whitchurch Rural District
Avenbury	225	11.27	Bromyard Rural District
Aylton	144	3.39	Ledbury Rural District
Aymestrey	351	26.06	Leominster and Wigmore Rural District
Bacton	53,516	20.34	Dore and Bredwardine Rural District
Ballingham	181	6.44	Ross and Whitchurch Rural District
Bartestree	330	1.71	Hereford Rural District
Belmont Rural	3,769	1.53	Hereford Rural District
Birley with Upper Hill	339	9.15	Weobley Rural District
Bishop's Frome	834	16.10	Bromyard Rural District
Bishopstone	208	4.11	Weobley Rural District
Blakemere			Weobley Rural District
Bodenham	998	21.39	Leominster and Wigmore Rural District
Bolstone			Hereford Rural District
Bosbury	813	23.67	Ledbury Rural District
Brampton Abbotts	352	6.16	Ross and Whitchurch Rural District
Brampton Bryan	214	21.04	Leominster and Wigmore Rural District
Bredenbury	169	3.44	Bromyard Rural District
Bredwardine	229	8.63	Dore and Bredwardine Rural District
Breinton	836	6.67	Hereford Rural District
Bridge Sollers			Weobley Rural District
Bridstow	906	8.66	Ross and Whitchurch Rural District
Brilley	367	23.90	Kington Rural District
Brimfield	751	7.49	Leominster and Wigmore Rural District
Brinsop and Wormsley	131	10.77	Weobley Rural District
Brobury with Monnington on Wye			Weobley Rural District
Brockhampton			Bromyard Rural District
Brockhampton	229	6.90	Ross and Whitchurch Rural District
Bromyard and Winslow (town)	4,236	13.39	Bromyard Rural District
Buckton and Coxall			Leominster and Wigmore Rural District
Burghill	1,579	15.22	Hereford Rural District
Burrington	138	15.62	Leominster and Wigmore Rural District
Byford	201	12.09	Weobley Rural District
Byton	184	12.73	Kington Rural District
Callow			Hereford Rural District
Canon Frome	285	10.59	Ledbury Rural District
Canon Pyon	542	17.21	Weobley Rural District
Castle Frome			Ledbury Rural District
Clehonger	1,382	6.99	Hereford Rural District
Clifford	511	27.11	Dore and Bredwardine Rural District
Coddington			Ledbury Rural District
Collington			Bromyard Rural District
Colwall	2,400	15.51	Ledbury Rural District
Combe			Kington Rural District
Cradley and Storridge	1,667	23.39	Bromyard Rural District
Craswall	153	20.93	Dore and Bredwardine Rural District
Credenhill	2,271	5.08	Hereford Rural District
Croft and Yarpole	552	14.51	Leominster and Wigmore Rural District
Cusop	356	9.31	Dore and Bredwardine Rural District
Dewsall			Hereford Rural District
Dilwyn	711	23.63	Weobley Rural District
Dinedor	328	6.75	Hereford Rural District
Dinmore			Hereford Rural District
Docklow and Hampton Wafer	236	14.24	Leominster and Wigmore Rural District
Donnington			Ledbury Rural District
Dormington	261	8.05	Hereford Rural District
Dorstone	401	21.72	Dore and Bredwardine Rural District
Downton			Leominster and Wigmore Rural District
Dulas			Dore and Bredwardine Rural District
Eardisland	502	14.58	Weobley Rural District
Eardisley	754	18.47	Kington Rural District
Eastnor	339	19.59	Ledbury Rural District
Eaton Bishop	414	6.72	Hereford Rural District
Edvin Loach and Saltmarshe			Bromyard Rural District
Edwyn Ralph	192	4.97	Bromyard Rural District
Eggleton			Ledbury Rural District
Elton			Leominster and Wigmore Rural District
Evesbatch			Bromyard Rural District
Ewyas Harold	883	7.49	Dore and Bredwardine Rural District
Eye, Moreton and Ashton		1.78	Leominster and Wigmore Rural District
Eyton	124	4.62	Leominster and Wigmore Rural District
Felton			Bromyard Rural District
Ford and Stoke Prior	364	12.71	Leominster and Wigmore Rural District
Fownhope	999	12.48	Hereford Rural District
Foy	158	9.58	Ross and Whitchurch Rural District
Ganarew	171	5.58	Ross and Whitchurch Rural District
Garway	430	15.07	Ross and Whitchurch Rural District
Goodrich	550	11.54	Ross and Whitchurch Rural District
Grafton	258	6.76	Hereford Rural District
Grendon Bishop			Bromyard Rural District
Hampton Bishop	505	8.38	Hereford Rural District
Hampton Charles			Bromyard Rural District
Harewood			Ross and Whitchurch Rural District
Hatfield and Newhampton	188	10.32	Leominster and Wigmore Rural District
Haywood	216	9.12	Hereford Rural District
Hentland	436	10.63	Ross and Whitchurch Rural District
Hereford (city)			Hereford Municipal Borough
Holme Lacy	466	13.18	Hereford Rural District
Holmer and Shelwick	1,386	5.55	Hereford Rural District
Hope Mansell	259	5.92	Ross and Whitchurch Rural District
Hope under Dinmore	412	11.93	Leominster and Wigmore Rural District
How Caple	118	4.11	Ross and Whitchurch Rural District
Humber	332	8.71	Leominster and Wigmore Rural District
Huntington			Kington Rural District
Kenchester			Hereford Rural District
Kentchurch	257	13.57	Dore and Bredwardine Rural District
Kilpeck	522	26.18	Dore and Bredwardine Rural District
Kimbolton	472	16.73	Leominster and Wigmore Rural District
Kings Caple	331	7.32	Ross and Whitchurch Rural District
King's Pyon	274	9.78	Weobley Rural District
Kingsland	986	19.93	Leominster and Wigmore Rural District
Kingstone	1,373	9.91	Dore and Bredwardine Rural District
Kington Rural	614	32.38	Kington Rural District
Kington (town)	2,626	3.47	Kington Urban District
Kinnersley	316	18.34	Weobley Rural District
Kinsham			Kington Rural District
Knill			Kington Rural District
Leysters	130	8.07	Leominster and Wigmore Rural District
Lea	673	3.38	Ross and Whitchurch Rural District
Ledbury (town)	9,297	26.47	Ledbury Rural District
Leinthall Starkes	168	14.05	Leominster and Wigmore Rural District
Leintwardine	830	22.70	Leominster and Wigmore Rural District
Leominster (town)	11,691	35.34	Leominster Municipal Borough
Letton			Weobley Rural District
Lingen	152	9.60	Leominster and Wigmore Rural District
Linton	385	9.43	Bromyard Rural District
Linton	953	11.22	Ross and Whitchurch Rural District
Little Birch	306	10.97	Hereford Rural District
Little Cowarne	116	2.80	Bromyard Rural District
Little Dewchurch	402	6.95	Hereford Rural District
Little Hereford	394	14.32	Leominster and Wigmore Rural District
Little Marcle	152	5.05	Ledbury Rural District
Llancillo			Dore and Bredwardine Rural District
Llandinabo			Ross and Whitchurch Rural District
Llangarron	1,053	21.89	Ross and Whitchurch Rural District
Llanrothal			Ross and Whitchurch Rural District
Llanveynoe	102	18.62	Dore and Bredwardine Rural District
Llanwarne	380	12.04	Ross and Whitchurch Rural District
Longtown	620	30.41	Dore and Bredwardine Rural District
Lower Bullingham	1,876	4.45	Hereford Rural District
Lower Harpton			Kington Rural District
Lucton	235	4.26	Leominster and Wigmore Rural District
Lugwardine	1,721	8.57	Hereford Rural District
Luston	541	6.77	Leominster and Wigmore Rural District
Lyonshall	757	19.26	Kington Rural District
Madley	1,200	21.62	Dore and Bredwardine Rural District
Mansell Lacy	139	5.32	Weobley Rural District
Mansell Gamage			Weobley Rural District
Marden	1,488	13.96	Hereford Rural District
Marstow	390	8.13	Ross and Whitchurch Rural District
Mathon	280	11.94	Ledbury Rural District
Michaelchurch Escley	198	18.54	Dore and Bredwardine Rural District
Middleton-on-the-Hill	228	12.13	Leominster and Wigmore Rural District
Moccas	105	4.82	Weobley Rural District
Monkland and Stretford	178	6.24	Leominster and Wigmore Rural District
Mordiford	527	7.88	Hereford Rural District
Moreton Jeffries			Bromyard Rural District
Moreton on Lugg	920	3.62	Hereford Rural District
Much Birch	911	5.27	Hereford Rural District
Much Cowarne	463	16.36	Bromyard Rural District
Much Dewchurch	654	19.79	Hereford Rural District
Much Marcle	660	19.62	Ledbury Rural District
Munsley			Ledbury Rural District
Newton	139	7.08	Dore and Bredwardine Rural District
Newton			Leominster and Wigmore Rural District
Norton Canon	242	8.69	Weobley Rural District
Norton	272	7.00	Bromyard Rural District
Ocle Pychard	351	12.37	Bromyard Rural District
Orcop	417	10.06	Dore and Bredwardine Rural District
Orleton	794	10.54	Leominster and Wigmore Rural District
Pembridge	1,056	31.16	Kington Rural District
Pencombe with Grendon Warren	329	17.14	Bromyard Rural District
Pencoyd	342	11.96	Ross and Whitchurch Rural District
Peterchurch	1,091	20.89	Dore and Bredwardine Rural District
Peterstow	444	5.32	Ross and Whitchurch Rural District
Pipe and Lyde	344	6.62	Hereford Rural District
Pipe Aston			Leominster and Wigmore Rural District
Pixley	258	10.41	Ledbury Rural District
Preston on Wye	186	6.05	Weobley Rural District
Preston Wynne	172	3.52	Hereford Rural District
Pudlestone	166	7.19	Leominster and Wigmore Rural District
Putley	245	4.49	Ledbury Rural District
Richards Castle (Hereford)	250	10.10	Leominster and Wigmore Rural District
Rodd, Nash and Little Brampton			Kington Rural District
Ross-on-Wye (town)	10,582	8.95	Ross on Wye Urban District
Rowlstone	180	14.66	Dore and Bredwardine Rural District
Sarnesfield			Weobley Rural District
Sellack	248	8.36	Ross and Whitchurch Rural District
Shobdon	816	14.72	Leominster and Wigmore Rural District
Sollers Hope			Ross and Whitchurch Rural District
St Margarets	180	10.54	Dore and Bredwardine Rural District
St Weonards	383	18.02	Ross and Whitchurch Rural District
Stanford Bishop	113	6.13	Bromyard Rural District
Stapleton	110	5.42	Kington Rural District
Staunton on Arrow	234	12.00	Kington Rural District
Staunton on Wye	488	15.89	Weobley Rural District
Stoke Edith			Hereford Rural District
Stoke Lacy	364	10.94	Bromyard Rural District
Stretton Grandison	175	6.38	Ledbury Rural District
Stretton Sugwas	505	7.83	Hereford Rural District
Sutton	925	8.26	Hereford Rural District
Tarrington	576	10.72	Ledbury Rural District
Tedstone Delamere	138	6.85	Bromyard Rural District
Tedstone Wafer	112	5.46	Bromyard Rural District
Thornbury	197	13.76	Bromyard Rural District
Thruxton			Dore and Bredwardine Rural District
Titley	261	19.19	Kington Rural District
Tretire with Michaelchurch			Ross and Whitchurch Rural District
Turnastone			Dore and Bredwardine Rural District
Tyberton	178	9.09	Dore and Bredwardine Rural District
Ullingswick	259	6.73	Bromyard Rural District
Upper Sapey	460	15.19	Bromyard Rural District
Upton Bishop	602	15.74	Ross and Whitchurch Rural District
Vowchurch	176	13.17	Dore and Bredwardine Rural District
Wacton	106	4.92	Bromyard Rural District
Walford, Letton and Newton		1.79	Leominster and Wigmore Rural District
Walford	1,514	20.20	Ross and Whitchurch Rural District
Walterstone			Dore and Bredwardine Rural District
Wellington Heath	440	4.18	Ledbury Rural District
Wellington	1,005	12.41	Hereford Rural District
Welsh Bicknor			Ross and Whitchurch Rural District
Welsh Newton	316	16.00	Ross and Whitchurch Rural District
Weobley	1,255	15.77	Weobley Rural District
Westhide			Hereford Rural District
Weston Beggard	214	3.71	Hereford Rural District
Weston under Penyard	1,007	14.38	Ross and Whitchurch Rural District
Whitbourne	799	19.04	Bromyard Rural District
Whitchurch	970	6.71	Ross and Whitchurch Rural District
Whitney-on-Wye	117	5.46	Kington Rural District
Wigmore	757	14.07	Leominster and Wigmore Rural District
Willersley and Winforton	209	6.42	Kington Rural District
Willey			Leominster and Wigmore Rural District
Withington	1,588	13.86	Hereford Rural District
Wolferlow			Bromyard Rural District
Woolhope	486	16.20	Ledbury Rural District
Yarkhill	326	9.14	Ledbury Rural District
Yatton	208	10.54	Ross and Whitchurch Rural District
Yazor	122	8.34	Weobley Rural District

== See also ==
- List of civil parishes in England
