= Edvin Loach and Saltmarshe =

Civil parish in Herefordshire, England

Coordinates: 52.2236°N 2.49721°W

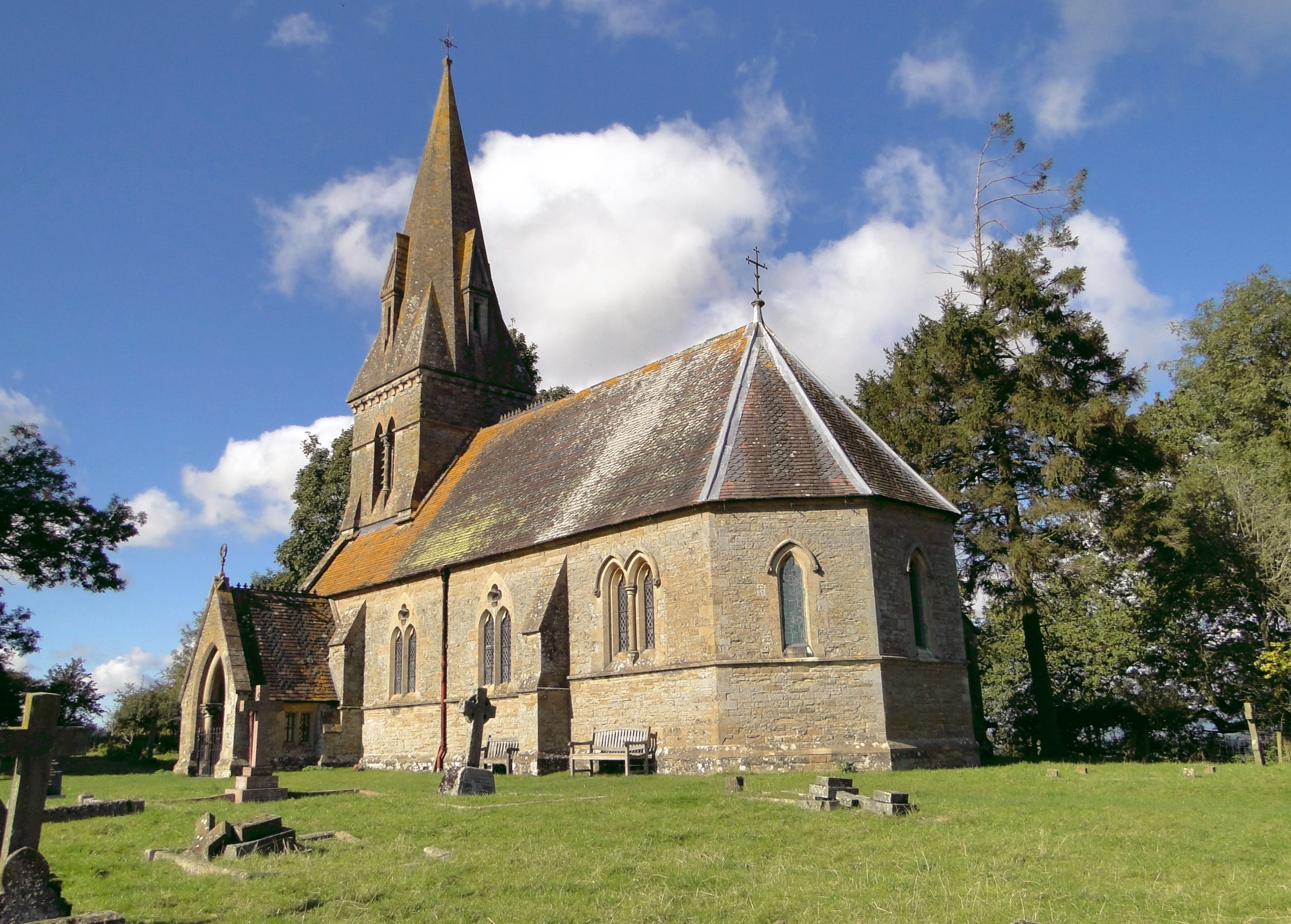
- St Mary's Church

- Location within Herefordshire
- Population: 272
- OS grid reference: SO660583
  - London: 110 mi (180 km) SE
- Unitary authority: Herefordshire
- Ceremonial county: Herefordshire
- Region: West Midlands
- Country: England
- Sovereign state: United Kingdom
- Post town: Hereford
- Postcode district: HR7
- Dialling code: 01885
- Police: West Mercia
- Fire: Hereford and Worcester
- Ambulance: West Midlands
- UK Parliament: North Herefordshire

Edvin Loach and Saltmarshe is a civil parish in north-east Herefordshire, England, and is approximately 15 miles (24 km) north-east from the city and county town of Hereford. The nearest town is Bromyard, 2.5 miles (4 km) to the south-west. Within the parish is a George Gilbert Scott built parish church in the virtually depopulated settlement of Edvin Loach, and the repurposed site of the demolished Saltmarshe Castle.

== History ==
In the Domesday Book the manor is listed as part of the Doddingtree hundred, which covered areas of today's Herefordshire and Worcestershire. The 1086 manor was owned by Herbert who received it from the 1066 lord of the manor, Wulfheah. Herbert held lordship under Osbern son of Richard, who in 1086 was the tenant-in-chief to William I. Manor occupation consisted of one villager, five smallholders (middle level of serf owning about five acres of land, below and with less land than a villager), and two slaves, on a ploughland area defined by one lord's and three men's plough teams. Edvin Loach, combined with Edvin Ralph (Edwyn Ralph), was attested as the manor of Gedesfenna in 1123, Yedefen in 1176 pipe rolls, Iadefen in 1212, and Yedefen Loges in 1242 when it was owned by the 13th-century 'de Loges' family, particularly John de Loges in 1212, with Edvin Ralph being held by a Ralph in 1176 and 1242. 'Loges' refers to a place name in France. In 1291 tax returns the manor is Yeddefenne Radh. Saltmarsh derives from the Old English 'salt' with 'mersc' meaning "salty or brackish marsh". In the 1170 the manor was written as Saltemers, in 1167 pipe rolls as Saltmareis, and in 1347 Episcopal Registers as Salso Marisco. The manor in the Domesday Book is listed as "Edevent", and "Gedeuen" from the Old English meaning 'fen or marshland of a man called Gedda'.

John de Loges, who held one of the two manors at Edvin Loach with a half a knight's fee, was succeeded in about 1280 by William de Loges, and by 1287 and 1308, the heirs of William. However, it wasn't until 1346 that ownership of the manor is definitively attributed, this to Hugh de Hawkesley. In 1393 the manor was conveyed with a carucate (area) of land to Roger Mortimer of Tedstone Wafer, with Hugh de Hawkesley acting as trustee. After the death of Roger Mortimer in 1402, the manor became tied with Kyre Wyard (Kyre Magna) manor in Worcestershire, until 1520 when both were sold. Edvin Loach was acquired by Lord de la Warr, whose son, Sir Thomas de la Warr, sold it to Sir Humphrey Coningsby in 1528, who also held the manor of North Piddle, whereby both manors were passed down in the Coningsby family until 1657–8, when Edvin Loach was sold to Sampson Wise. In 1625 the parish (as opposed to the manor), then in Worcestershire, had been united with the nearby parish of Tedstone Wafre. Despite no deeds being available for the manor until 1782, Edvin Loach, with other manors such as Orleton, were transferred to Ferdinando Gorges of Eye, but returned to the Coningsby's through the marriage of Gorges' daughter to Thomas Coningsby (1656 – 1729), who was created Earl of Coningsby in 1719. Edvin Loach was probably passed down to Margaret, the daughter to Thomas' second wife Lady Frances Jones, daughter to Richard Jones, 1st Earl of Ranelagh. Margaret died (1761), without issue; her younger sister, Frances, inherited and married Sir Charles Hanbury Williams, their daughter, also a Frances, marrying William Capell, 4th Earl of Essex. This Frances (Lady Hanbury-Williams), died in 1781, whereupon the inheritance passed to her grandson George Capel (1757 – 1839), who assumed the name Capell-Coningsby. The manor was in the possession of George Capell-Coningsby in 1782, before succeeding as the fifth Earl of Essex (ninth creation). Shortly after George Capell-Coningsby inherited the manor in 1799, he sold it to William Higginson of Saltmarshe who passed it to "his great-nephew Edmund Barneby, who took the name Higginson in 1825 and died childless in 1871". Edmund then passed the estate to his nephew William Barneby, who was succeeded by his son William Theodore Barneby in 1895.

The second manor at Edvin Loach is possibly linked, in about 1280, to the land of Miles Pichard. Between 1300 and 1304 Edmund Mortimer of Wigmore bought the estate from Pichard, after which it descended with the manor of Bromsgrove, and then in 1431 to John Holland, 2nd Duke of Exeter (1395 – 1447), who had married Anne (died 20 or 24 September 1432), the widow of Edmund Mortimer, 5th Earl of March. The estates of the earldom of March, including this second manor, probably passed to Edward IV. In 1556 a Thomas Baskerville leased the estate to a James Jones. Edvin Loach and Stoke Bliss became a joint ownership which descended to Thomas Baskerville, son to John Baskerville, who conveyed parts of the manors in 1621 to Thomas Collins and William Fox. The same year Thomas Baskerville conveyed Edvin Loach, other parts of Stoke Bliss, with Netherwood, to an Edward Reed, who in turn in 1648 conveyed it to a James Pecock.

=== 19th century ===
By the 1850s Edvin Loach had historically formed an exclave (detached portion) of Worcestershire, surrounded by Herefordshire, and in the upper division of Doddingtree hundred and the eastern division of the county. It was part of the Bromyard Union—poor relief and joint parish workhouse provision set up under the Poor Law Amendment Act 1834. It was in the Frome rural deanery and the Salop (Shropshire) archdeaconry of the Hereford bishopric. The parish church, dedicated to St Mary, was described as an "old stone building" with a bell turret, chancel and porch, of Saxon in part. The ecclesiastical living was a rectory, with 34 acres (14 hectares) of glebe—an area of land used to support the parish church and priest—and a residence which was in the gift of Edmund Higginson, the principal landowner. The 1851 population was 69 in a parish area of 530 acres (210 hectares) of "clayey soil". Listed in the parish was the rector and two farmers. Letters were processed through Bromyard, which was the nearest money order office. By 1861, parish population was 53.

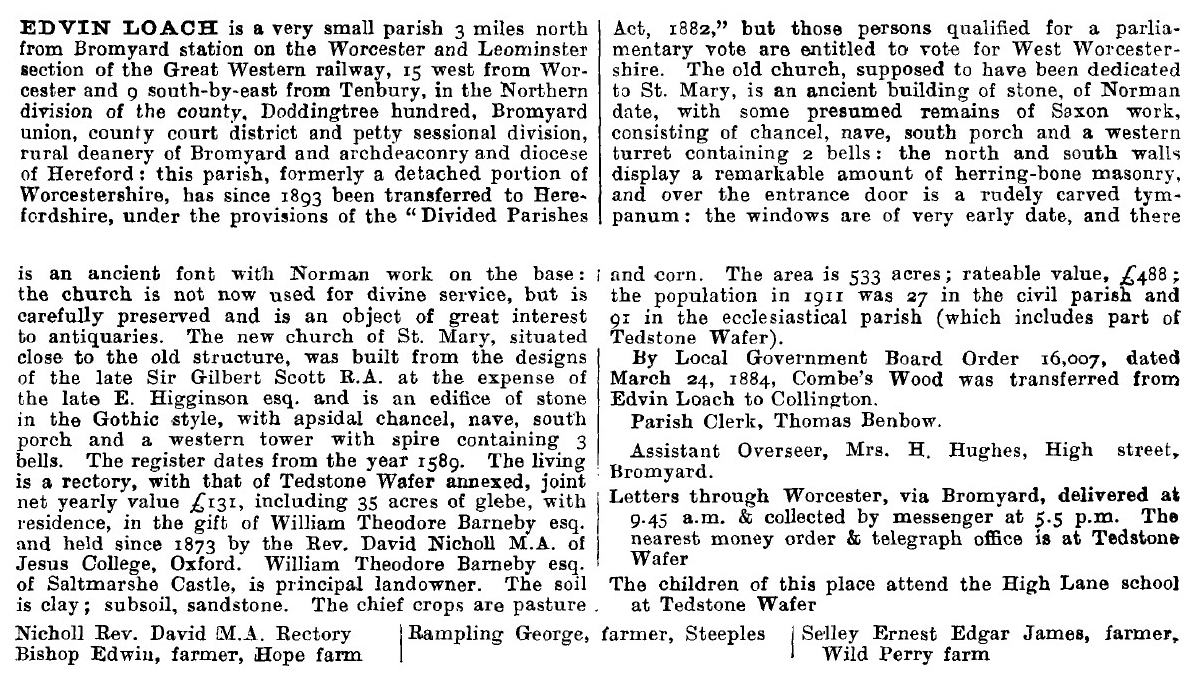
Edvin Loach in Kelly's Directory 1913

By the 1870s the old St Mary's church was not then used for divine service, but was reported as being "carefully preserved", its architecture of "great interest to antiquarians". This church had been superseded for worship by an adjacent new St Mary's, built by Sir George Gilbert Scott, at the expense of Edmund Higginson, described as a ""handsome stone edifice, with apsidal chancel, nave, and spire". The church register dates to 1589. The living was at that time united with that of Tedstone Wafer, in the gift of William Barneby of Saltmarshe Castle and Clater Park, who was also lord of the manor and principal landowner. The soil was described as of clay with a subsoil of sandstone. Chief crops grown were pasture, corn, and some hops. By1871 the population had dropped to 46. The Bromyard post and money order office, was now also a telegraph office. The rector, and now three farmers were listed

In the 1880s the parish was still in Worcestershire and surrounded by Herefordshire. William Barneby, lord of the manor and chief landowner, was now the Deputy Lieutenant of Herefordshire and a Justice of the Peace. Population in 1881 was 44. The children of the parish attended the High Lane School at Tedstone Wafer. The old St Mary's church had an additional description noting the "remarkable amount of herring-bone masonry [and that] over the entrance door is a rude tympanium [and] the windows are of very early date, and there is an ancient font with Norman work on the base". The careful preservation is still reported.

Edvin Loach was transferred from Worcestershire to Herefordshire in 1893, under the provisions of the Divided Parishes Act of 1882. The St Mary's church register was reported as dating to 1570 or 1589, with seating accommodating 80. By 1895 Edvin Loach ecclesiastical parish had transferred to the rural deanery of Burford (east division) and the archdeaconry of Ludlow within the Hereford Diocese. Although the civil parish was now in Herefordshire, those entitled to vote for parliamentary elections did so for the West Worcestershire constituency. A Local Government Board Order of 1884 had transferred land, as Combe's Wood, from Edvin Loach to neighbouring Collington. By 1895 the lord of the manor and principal landowner was now William Theodore Barneby M.A. of Saltmarshe Castle, who was still holding his position in 1913. Population in 1891 was 48. By 1913 the ecclesiastical parish was within the Bromyard rural deanery and archdeaconry and diocese of Hereford, and part of Tedstone Wafer was still annexed to Edvin Loach. The civil parish population in 1891 was 27; the ecclesiastical parish, 91. The parliamentary electorate still voted in the West Worcestershire constituency. Occupational listings still only mention the rector and farmers.

== Geography ==
Edvin Loach and Saltmarshe parish boundary is of irregular footprint, but approximately, at its greatest distance, 1.8 miles (3 km) north to south, 1.2 miles (2 km) east to west, and covers an area of approximately 664 acres (269 hectares). Adjacent parishes are Collington at the north-west, Tedstone Wafer at the north and north-east, Norton at the east and south, and Edwyn Ralph at the west. The parish is rural, of three farms, fields, managed woodland and coppices, water courses, lakes and ponds, and residential properties. Flowing north to south at the east of the parish is a tributary stream to the River Frome, 2 miles (3 km) to the south, which forms parts of the eastern borders with Norton in the south, and farther upstream, Tedstone Wafer. There are three minor roads within the parish. In the northern part of the parish is the 1,200 yards (1,100 metres) east to west through road, externally from the B2414 Tenbury road in Edwyn Ralf at the west, to Tedstone Wafer at the east. From this road, a road at the centre of the parish runs 1,300 yards (1,200 metres) south to the Norton parish border; at the south from this runs a road east past St Mary's Church and then south to Norton. All other routes are bridleways, farm tracks, property entrances and footpaths.

== Governance ==
Edvin Loach and Saltmarshe is represented in the lowest tier of UK governance by the seven-member, five-parish North Bromyard Group Parish Council, which also represents the parishes of Upper Sapey, Wolferlow, Tedstone Wafre and Tedstone Delamere, and is part of the Eastern Area Meeting Group of the Herefordshire four-parts Parish Council Area Meeting Groups. As Herefordshire is a unitary authority—no district council between parish and county councils—the parish sends one councilor representing the Bromyard Bringsty Ward, to Herefordshire County Council. Edvin Loach and Saltmarshe is represented in the UK parliament as part of the North Herefordshire constituency.

In 1974 Edvin Loach and Saltmarshe became part of the now defunct Malvern Hills District of the county of Hereford and Worcester, instituted under the Local Government Act 1972.

== Community ==
There are no bus routes that pass through the parish. The closest rail connections are at Leominster railway station, 10 miles (16 km) to the west, Hereford 15 miles (24 km) to the south-west, both on the Crewe to Newport Welsh Marches Line, and Worcester Foregate, Worcestershire Parkway and Worcester Shrub Hill railway stations at Worcester, 12 miles east with links on the Cotswold, Cross Country and West Midlands Trains lines.

The nearest hospitals are Bromyard community hospital, 2 miles (3 km) to the south, with the nearest major hospital, Hereford County Hospital, 15 miles south-west at Hereford, both part of the Wye Valley NHS Trust, and the Worcestershire Royal Hospital to the east. For religion St Mary's parish church falls under the parish of Greater Whitbourne, in the Deanery of Bromyard in the Diocese of Hereford. The nearest catchment area primary schools are Brockhampton Primary School, the closest, on Bromyard Downs (road) at Brockhampton, and St. Peter's Primary School at Bromyard; the nearest secondary is Queen Elizabeth High School at Bromyard. In latest Ofsted inspections Brockhampton Primary was rated Grade 2 'Good' (2017); St. Peter's Grade 2 'Good' (2018); and Queen Elizabeth High School Grade 2 'Good' (2017).

At the south-east of the parish is the bungalow estate of Saltmarshe Castle Residential Park, built over the site of the former country house estate of Saltmarshe Castle.

== Landmarks ==
There are nine Grade II and one Grade II* listed buildings in Edvin Loach and Saltmarshe, including a house, a cottage, a farmhouse, three barns, a lodge, a turret, a church and a ruin of a further church.

Hope Farmhouse (grid reference SO6635359025), is a Grade II* listed 16th-century farmhouse, rebuilt partly in brick in the 18th century. The house is of two storeys and six bays with sash windows, and a gable-ended slate roof. The earlier south end is timber-framed with roughcast facing; the north end, brick. The central east entrance has a first floor gabled projection as extension to the upper level, supported to the ground by oak posts. The interior contains a 17th-century staircase. In 2014 the house was on sale for an estimated £550k. At 100 yards (90 m) south-east from the farmhouse are two Grade II barns and a cattle shed range (long building or row of buildings). The barns and range are all 17th century, timber framed with brick nogging, and gable ended roofs of tile and asbestos. The west part of the range is a cart shed with a roof dormer door and an open stone rubble ground floor, with a larger barn attached to the east side which has a north facing slatted double door running from ground to eaves. Attached to this, running south, is a part 18th- or 19th-century cattle shed wing of course-worked rubble.

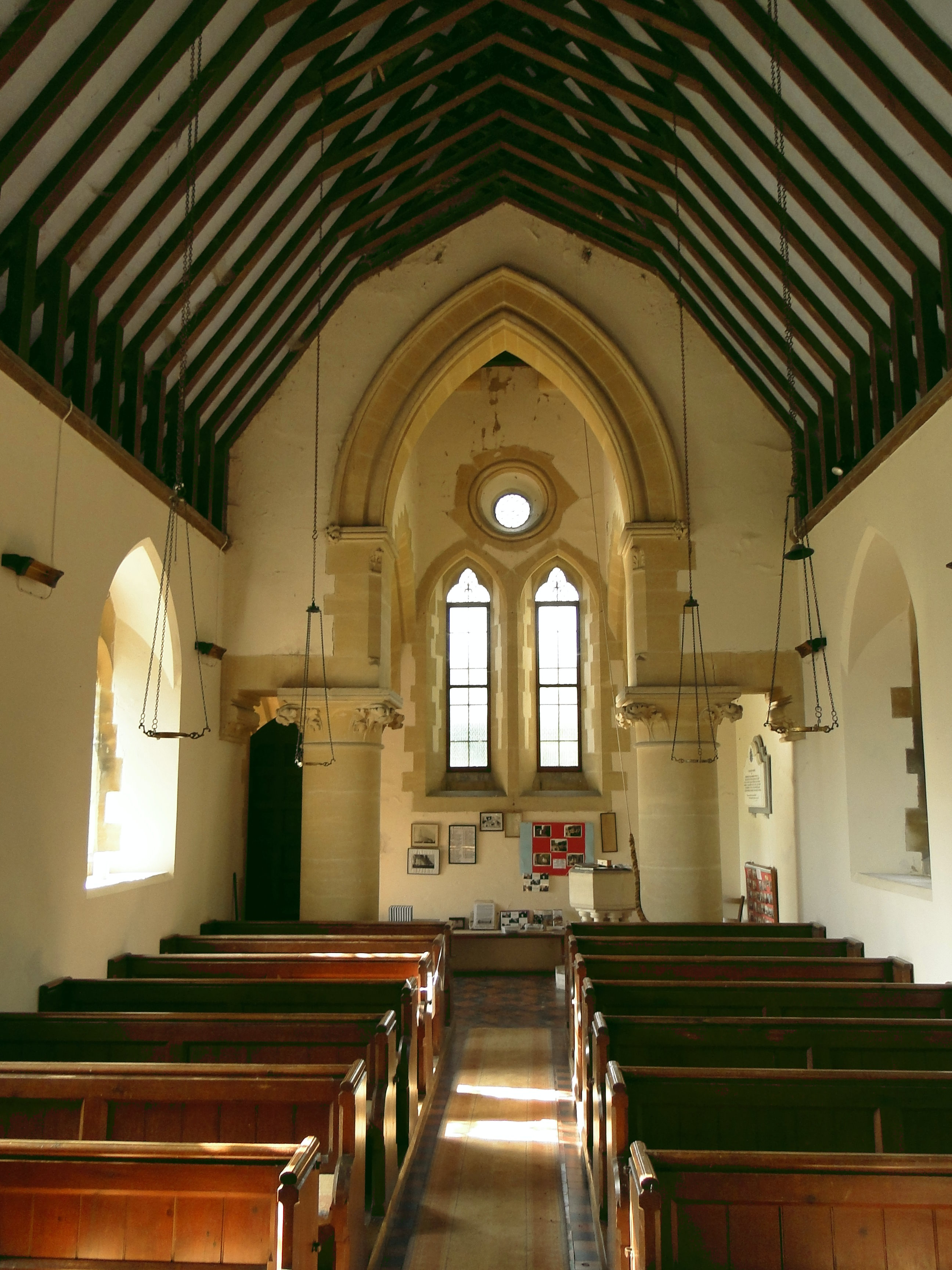
St Mary's nave and tower arch

St Mary's Grade II parish church (grid reference SO6623458428), at the south of the parish, was designed in late 13th-century style by George Gilbert Scott and built between 1858 and 1860 at the expense of Edmund Higginson of Saltmarshe Castle. Of local sandstone with limestone keystones, it comprises a buttressed west tower, south porch, a nave with chancel as part of a singular structure, with a chancel apse with lancet stained glass windows at the east, and a vestry attached to the north of the chancel. The nave is supported by two buttresses each side. The first (bell) floor of the tower has twin-light lancet windows as abat-sons, and above, a broach spire with gabled dormer window each side. The interior contains a " wide pointed wooden arch" between the nave and chancel, plastered walls and tiled floors. The tower pointed arch is supported by large free-standing columns, with foliate details on each corner of the capitals, inset from the nave walls. Furnishings mostly date to 1860, including pews, the octagonal font, a stone polygonal pulpit, a wooden communion rail, and wooden priests stalls at the south of the chancel. The chancel windows, dating to 1869, show the Crucifixion, Resurrection and Ascension. In December 1997 three of St Mary's bell were stolen; in 2004 two of the bells were recovered in Wiltshire.

In St Mary's graveyard at 25 yards (23 m), east from the church apse (grid reference SO6626858439), are the roofless (since the 1890s), sandstone rubble ruins of the old Edvin Loach church, which dates from the 11th century. The remains comprise only parts of the external coursework stone walls of the nave, and a probably 16th-century tower. The north wall has embedded herringbone masonry, which might be a survival of an even earlier church. The Norman Romanesque south doorway of grey Tufa limestone, has, above its "massive lintel", a relieving semi-circular arch and tympanum. A surviving window opening at the east is late Norman; the east wall and parts of the north and south walls were rebuilt in the 12th century. Broken remains of a Romanesque font existed before 1986.

The old and new church are on the site of a previous Motte-and-bailey castle, as earthworks and buried remains, these at the highest part of the parish—600 feet (180 m)—today a scheduled monument. The circular mound motte is of a maximum diameter of 100 feet (30 m) and rises 6.5 feet (2 m) to a flat top width of 72 feet (22 m), and is surrounded by a 33 feet (10 m) wide ditch, particularly visible at the south-west. The square bailey on which the old church and its churchyard burial ground sits, is of 230 feet (70 m) width.

A two-storey lodge (grid reference SO6757458024), at the edge of Saltmarshe Castle Residential Park on the B4203 road at the border with neighboring Norton parish, is a former gatehouse lodge of the 1955 demolished Saltmarshe Castle and its estate. It dates to the mid-19th century, of polygonal footprint, walls of stonework coursing with crenellated parapet, and two-light sash windows within stone mullions with squared hood moulds.

Steeples (grid reference SO6649458156), at the southern border with Norton, is a 17th-century tile-roofed stone rubble house, orientated north to south, with a timber-framed cross wing each end. The larger southern wing is 16th century, with brick nogging infil; the smaller northern wing 17th century. The house is of two storeys with casement windows. At 220 yards (200 m) north from Steeples on the same road is Finches Cottage (grid reference SO6650658358), a 17th-century house, previously listed as a barn in 1973, timber-framed with brick nogging infill, tile-roofed with two dormer windows, an end-attached brick (listed as stone), chimney stack at the east, and a central gabled porch at the south. A modern brick gable extension is added centrally to the north side.
