= Norton, Herefordshire =

Civil parish in Herefordshire, England

Coordinates: 52.1952°N 2.49157°W

Norton
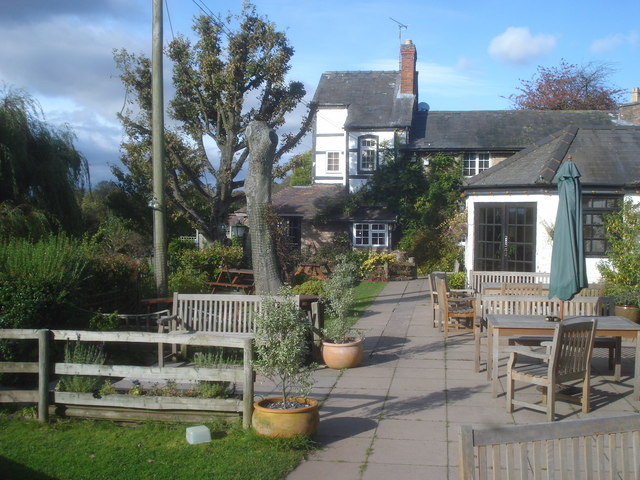
- The Royal Oak, Bromyard Downs

- Location within Herefordshire
- Population: 272 (2011 Census)
- OS grid reference: SO664553
  - London: 110 mi (180 km) SE
- Unitary authority: Herefordshire
- Ceremonial county: Herefordshire
- Region: West Midlands
- Country: England
- Sovereign state: United Kingdom
- Post town: Hereford
- Postcode district: HR7
- Dialling code: 01885
- Police: West Mercia
- Fire: Hereford and Worcester
- Ambulance: West Midlands
- UK Parliament: North Herefordshire

Norton is a civil parish in north-east Herefordshire, England, and is approximately 14 miles (23 km) north-east from the city and county town of Hereford. The closest town is Bromyard, conjoined to the parish at the south-west. The parish includes the elevated public open common land of Bromyard Downs.

== History ==
Norton derives from 'north farmstead, or village... i.e. a homestead or village to the north of another settlement', from the Old English north with tūn.

During the 19th century, today's Norton was administratively a joint township with Brockhampton as 'Norton with Brockhampton', under Bromyard, which included in 1856 at the north-east of the parish, Saltmarshe Castle, the residence of Edmund Higginson (1802-71), who had changed his name from his Barneby birth surname, was High Sheriff of Herefordshire and an art collector, and whose estate also included parts of Tedstone Delamere and Edvin Loach parishes where he sponsored the rebuilding of the parish churches. Higginson was a chief landowner of the parish, and renovated Saltmarshe Castle to a more contemporary style of architecture, with added towers and battlements, leaving part of the old castle. Saltmarshe Castle was demolished in 1955. Also directory listed is Brockhampton House, 2 miles (3 km) north-east from Bromyard, had attached a private chapel with its own curate. Norton with Brockhampton had an infant school for boys and girls. The lord of the manor was the Bishop of Hereford, Renn Hampden. The parish of 1,708 acres (691 hectares) had 'clayey and loamy' soil, on which were grown chiefly wheat, barley and beans, and had an 1851 population of 528. Occupations listed in the Norton part of the parish were nine farmers, one of which was also a builder, a carrier—transporter of trade goods, with sometimes people, between different settlements—two shopkeepers, a miller at Three Mills, a blacksmith, and a collector of rates.

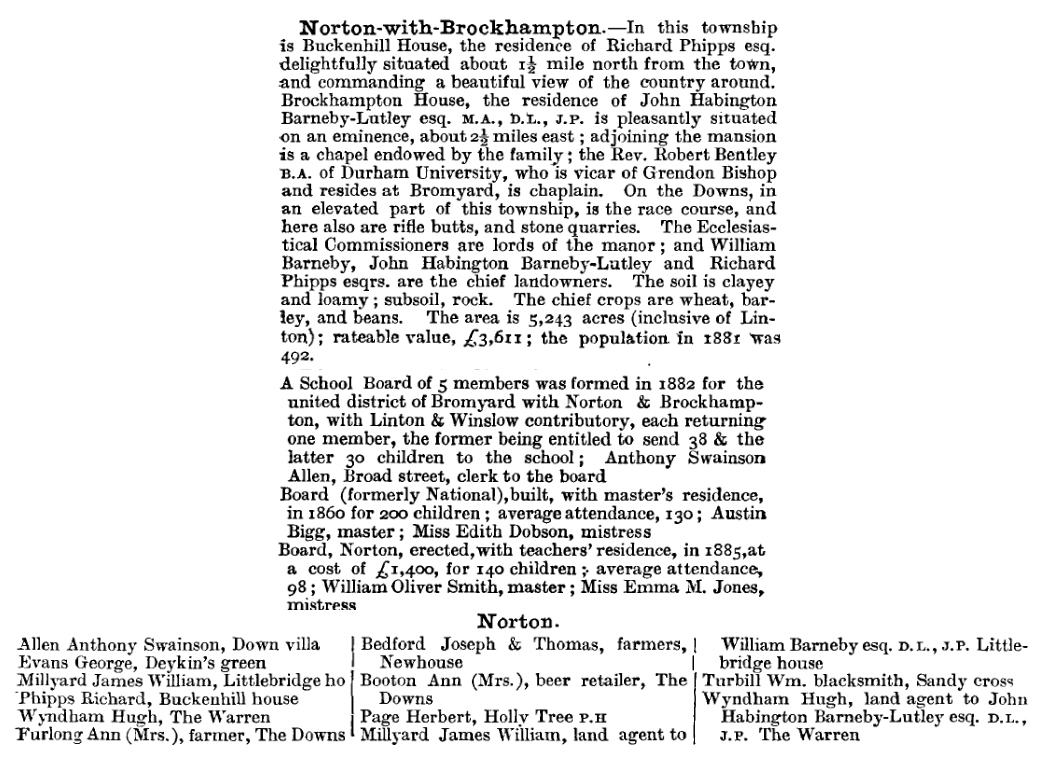
Norton in Kelly's Directory of Herefordshire, 1885

By the 1880s John Habington Barneby Lutley (1840-1906) DL, JP, a chief parish landowner, was the resident of Brockhampton House; the chaplain of the chapel, resident at Bromyard, was also the vicar of Grendon Bishop. The Ecclesiastical Commissioners were the lords of the manor. On Bromyard Downs was a race course, rifle butts and stone quarries. An oak tree was planted in 1887 in commemoration of the Golden Jubilee of Queen Victoria. Parish area, including that of adjacent Linton was 5,243 acres (2,122 hectares). The population in 1881 was 492. A School Board was formed in 1882 covering the united district comprising Bromyard, Norton with Brockhampton, Linton, and Winslow. A Board school (formerly a National school), was built in 1885, at a cost of £1,400; built for 140 pupils, the average attendance was 98. Occupations listed in the Norton part of the parish in 1885 were five farmers, one of whom was a beer & cider retailer at Bromyard Downs, another also a miller at Three Mills, and a third beer & cider retailer at Bromyard Downs, a further beer & cider retailer at Bromyard Downs, the licensee and a & cider retailer at the Holly Tree public house, a blacksmith, a shopkeeper, a gamekeeper, a sawyer, a farm bailiff, and two land agents, one to John Habington Barneby Lutley.

By the 20th century, Norton was a civil parish in its own right. In 1913, Bromyard Downs was listed as siting 'the old racecourse', with also stone quarries and a golf course. Norton parish was now of 1,731 acres (701 hectares), and 3 acres (1.2 hectares) of water [lakes]. According to directory entry: 'anciently the ecclesiastical parish of Bromyard, comprising an area of 7,580 acres (3,070 hectares), consisted of the four townships of Bromyard, Linton, Norton and Winslow. For ecclesiastical and civil purposes the areas of these parishes have been considerably modified, and the ecclesiastical parish now comprises the Urban Parish of Bromyard and portions of the civil parishes of Brockhampton, Linton, Norton, Whitbourne and Winslow... with an area of 2,719 acres (1,100 hectares)'. Population in 1911 was 374. Occupations over and above the 1880s listings included a Primitive Methodist minister, a chimney sweep, a laundry worker, and a pig killer at Bromyard Downs, two head gardeners, and a tobacconist. Population in 1921 was 373. By 1929 Occupations over and above 1885 and 1913 included the honorary secretary of Broad Oak Golf Club (Bromyard Downs), a boot & shoe repairer, and another boot repairer. Farmers now numbered eleven, with an additional six 'cottage farmers'. There were now two public houses, the Holly Tree and the Royal Oak, the licensees both being described as a beer retailer.

== Geography ==
Norton parish boundary is of irregular footprint, but approximately, at its greatest distance, 2.5 miles (4 km) north to south, 2 miles (3 km) east to west in the northern half and 1 mile (2 km) east to west in the southern, and covers an area of 1,730 acres (700 hectares). Adjacent parishes are Edvin Loach & Saltmarshe at the north-west, Tedstone Wafer and Tedstone Delamere at the north, Whitbourne at the north-east, Brockhampton at the east comprising the National Trust's Brockhampton Estate, Linton at the south, and Edwyn Ralph and Bromyard & Winslow at the west. The parish is rural, of farms, fields, managed woodland and coppices, water courses, small lakes and ponds, isolated and dispersed businesses, residential properties and, at the south-east, the public open land of Bromyard Downs where there is an agglomerated residential area. Flowing north to south at the west of the parish is a tributary to the River Frome which forms the western boundary with Bromyard & Winslow, and farther upstream, Edvin Loach & Saltmarshe. The confluence of the tributary and the Frome is at the extreme south-west of Norton which is conjoined with the town of Bromyard.

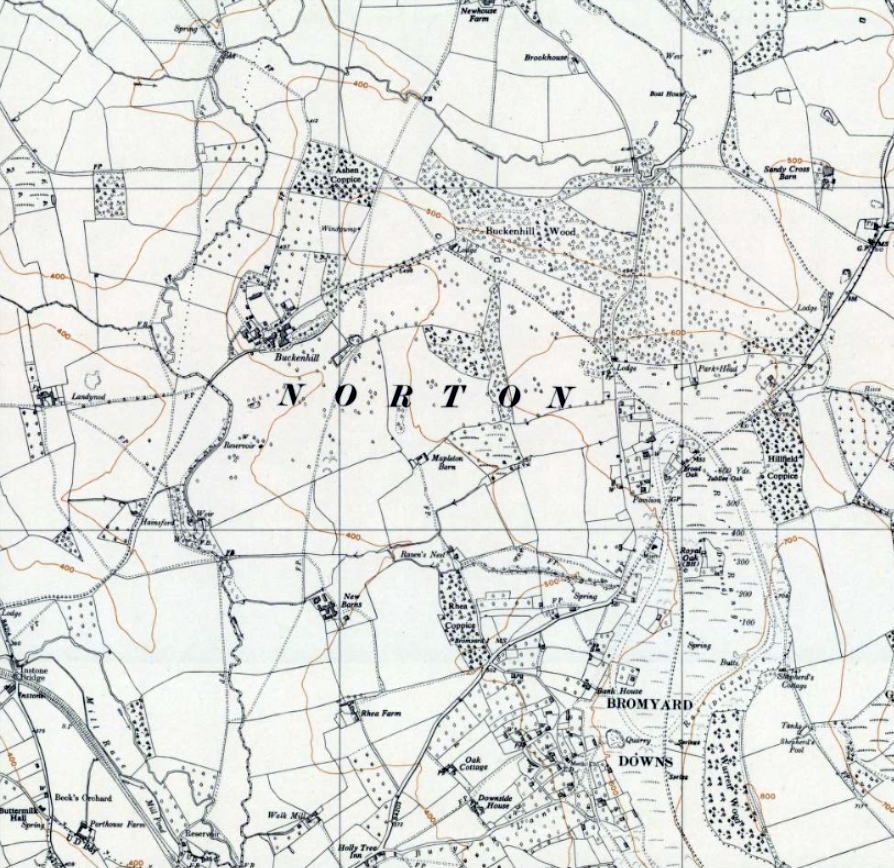
OS map of Norton Herefordshire, pre-1930

The only numbered route is the B4203 road which runs from Bromyard northward, in part becoming the parish boundary with Brockhampton and, then beyond the parish, through Tedstone Wafer village to Worcestershire. From the B4203 at Bromyard Downs runs south a minor road, arcing around the Downs to Linton, and to the A44 which runs from Bromyard to the city of Worcester at the east. A further road, Burying Lane at the south-west of the parish, runs from a junction with the B4203, 400 yards (366 m) from the parish border with Bromyard, to the Downs agglomerated residential area. At the north of the Downs, a road runs south-east from the B4203, crosses into Brockhampton to the A44 near the Bromyard Downs Caravan and Motorhome Club campsite. A further road north on the B4203 runs to Edvin Loach, with a fork which runs to the bungalow estate of Saltmarshe Castle Park in Edvin Loach. Saltmarshe Castle Park is the site of Saltmarshe Castle, which, before boundary changes, was part of Norton; the Park's main entrance is on the B4203. At 70 yards (64 m) farther north on the B4203 is the road junction with a road running east, which begins as the boundary with Brockhampton and then runs 2 miles (3 km) to Whitbourne Hall. All other routes are country lanes, bridleways, farm tracks and footpaths.

== Governance ==
Norton is represented in the lowest tier of UK governance by the seven-member Brockhampton Group Parish Council, which also represents the parishes of Brockhampton and Linton. As Herefordshire is a unitary authority—no district council between parish and county councils—the parish sends councillors representing the Bromyard Bringsty Ward, to Herefordshire County Council. Norton is represented in the UK parliament as part of the North Herefordshire constituency.

In 1974 Norton became part of the now defunct Malvern Hills District of the county of Hereford and Worcester, instituted under the Local Government Act 1972.

== Community ==
For the 2011 Census Norton recorded a population of '272 usual residents... 100% lived in 129 household spaces and 0% lived in communal establishments... average (mean) age of residents was 50.8 years'.

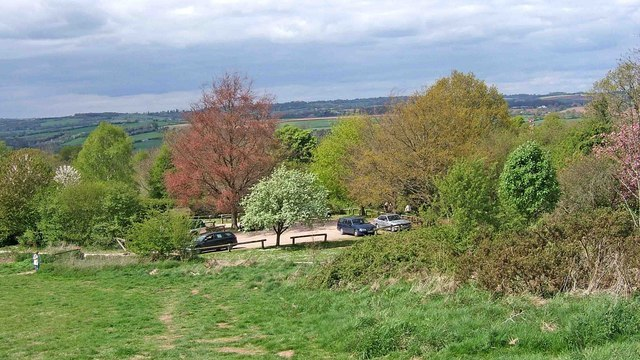
View west across Norton from Bromyard Downs

A bus route with three each way stops, just outside the parish at the south on the A44, runs between Bromyard and Worcester. The closest rail connections are at Leominster railway station, 12 miles (19 km) to the west, Hereford 13 miles (21 km) to the south-west, both on the Crewe to Newport Welsh Marches Line, and Worcester Foregate, Worcestershire Parkway and Worcester Shrub Hill railway stations at Worcester, 10 miles (16 km) east with links on the Cotswold, Cross Country and West Midlands Trains lines.

The nearest hospitals are Bromyard community hospital, just outside the parish border in Bromyard, with the nearest major hospital, Hereford County Hospital, 13 miles south-west at Hereford, both part of the Wye Valley NHS Trust, and the Worcestershire Royal Hospital to the east.

The nearest primary schools are Brockhampton Primary School, the closest, on Bromyard Downs (road) at Brockhampton, and St. Peter's Primary School at Bromyard; the nearest secondary is Queen Elizabeth High School at Bromyard. In latest Ofsted inspections Brockhampton Primary was rated Grade 2 'Good' (2017); St. Peter's Grade 2 'Good' (2018); and Queen Elizabeth High School Grade 2 'Good' (2017).

There are two public houses: the Royal Oak at Bromyard Downs, and the Holly Tree on the B4203 at the south-west which is also a bed & breakfast establishment. Next to the Holly Tree is a Travis Perkins builders' merchant, the site for the Bromyard Folk Festival, and Delahay Meadow, the football ground of Bromyard Town Football Club. North from the Holly Tree is a dog boarding kennels, and north-east at Bromyard Downs, a taxi service and a woodland holiday home business.

For religion, Norton falls under the Deanery of Bromyard in the Diocese of Hereford, although no church or parish church exists within the civil parish. The nearest parish churches are St Peter's at Bromyard, St James' at Stanford Bishop village to the south which is part of the eight-church Frome Valley Churches' ministry, and St James' in Tedstone Delamere, in the ecclesiastical parish of Greater Whitbourne.

== Landmarks ==
There are 15 Grade II listed buildings in Norton, including houses, cottages, farmhouses and farm buildings.

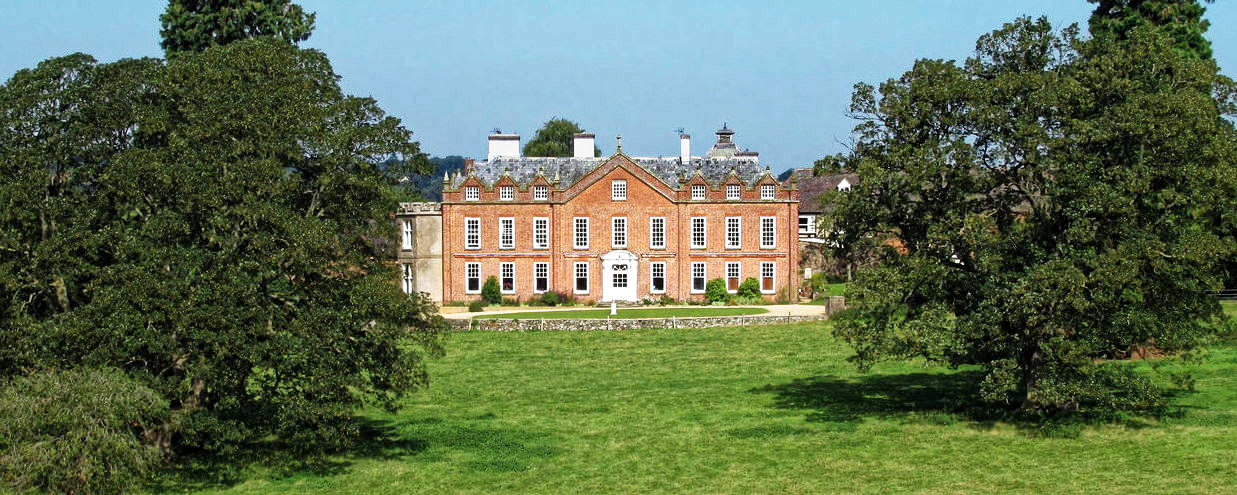
Buckenhill Manor

Buckenhill Manor (grid reference SO658565), 1 mile (2 km) north from Bromyard, off the B4203 road, and dating to about 1730, is a two-storey with attic red brick house. The front face is of nine bays, the central three within a central pedimental gable. The attic floor is surrounded by a Victorian brick parapet where the two external three-bay windows are set within gabled dormers topped with finials. Inset from the parapet is the slate hipped gable roof. There are nine 18-pane sash windows on the first floor, and eight, four each side of the main entrance, on the ground floor. The central 9-pane central door with fanlight is set within a porch comprising a arched broken pediment and corinthian columns, set on three semi-circular steps. On left hand (south-west) return is a five-sided two-storey rendered stone wing with a crenellated parapet. Part of the structure at the rear contains a 19th-century tower with lantern. In the late 19th century Buckenhill became a boys home which was affiliated to Barnardo's, housing 47 older boys who were taught farm work before emigration to Canada. It was a hotel during the 1930s, and was the main accommodation for Westminster School during the Second World War. In 2020, the house was on the market for £2,000,000, the same year available for monthly rental, and following this, catered for bed & breakfast.

Middle Norton (grid reference SO678575), 2.5 miles (4 km) north-east from Bromyard, off the B4203 road 0.5 miles (1 km) east from Saltmarshe Castle Caravan Park, is a 17th-century two-storeyed house with cellars, in parts timber-framed, brick and rubble. The casement windows have leaded frames. The tiled roofs include diagonal brick chimneys. The house was initially built in the early 17th century, with its timber-frame exposed south-east wing of a later date. In the early 18th century the south fascia of the house was refaced in brick. The interior contains 17th-century ceiling beams and wall posts. The house is part of a listed group of farm buildings.

At Saltmarshe Castle Park is the listed south-east lodge with gates of the former Saltmarshe Castle (grid reference SO674566), on the B4203 road. Both are mid-19th century. The lodge is of two storeys with a castellated parapet. Its stone mullioned sash windows have square hood moulds. The 19th-century owner of the Edward Haycock built Saltmarshe Castle, Barneby (later Edmund) Higginson (1802 - 1871), who inherited the estate from his uncle William Higginson (died 1812, whose wealth derived from coal mining), and who was a partner in the merchants Greenwood & Higginson at Queen Street in Cheapside, London, was a noted art collector of more than 80 works, including those by Claude, Hondecoeter, Steen and Tiepolo, and John Constable's Hay Wain.

Cockalay (grid reference SO683579), 720 yards (658 m) north-east from Middle Norton, is an early 17th-century house, of timber framed upper storey on a stone rubble lower storey, and with cellars and attics. The upper storey projects, supported by a chamfered bressummer. The roof is tiled with stone chimney stacks. The house has a later extension at the west. The interior contains 17th-century panelling and exposed ceiling beams. At Fishpool Orchard (grid reference SO6836057820), 100 yards (91 m) south-east from Cockalay, is the archeological site of a post medieval fishpond.

Upper Norton (grid reference SO6809058088) at the north of the parish and 500 yards (457 m) east from the B4203, is a late 18th-century, L-shaped red brick house of two storeys and an attic. The roof is slate tiled with three gabled dormers. Windows are sash. Oriented east to west, the stone rubble wing runs north from the west end, and includes an outhouse and a cider press. Red brick farm buildings of barn, cattle shed and stables, 30 yards (27 m) adjacent at the west and south-west, form a further listed group of buildings.

Down Manor (grid reference SO671548) at the south-east of the parish on Bromyard Downs, 1 mile east from Bromyard, is a two-storeyed, stucco-ed early 19th-century house, with a slate hipped roof with overhanging eaves. There is a central panelled entrance door set within a porch with cornice, and pilasters are at each edge of the building from ground to roof line. The windows are sash.

Providence Cottage (grid reference SO6652055193), front gate identified as Providence Place, off Burying Lane at the western foot of Bromyard Downs, is 17th century of one storey and an attic, with two gable dormers and casement windows. The ground floor is of stone rubble with two casement windows, and timber framing above. The roof is gabled with slate tiles, at the north-east end of which is an external chimney stack, stone below and brick above. The central doorway has a gabled hood mould.

Turnpike (grid reference SO6726154815), on Bromyard Downs is an early to mid-19th-century tollhouse cottage, of single storey with a hipped slate roof and central brick chimney, and a central porch with elliptical arch roof. There are two twin-light arched windows with square hood moulds, one either side of the main entrance.
