= Collington, Herefordshire =

Village in Herefordshire, England

Coordinates: 52.240406°N 2.5138970°W

Collington
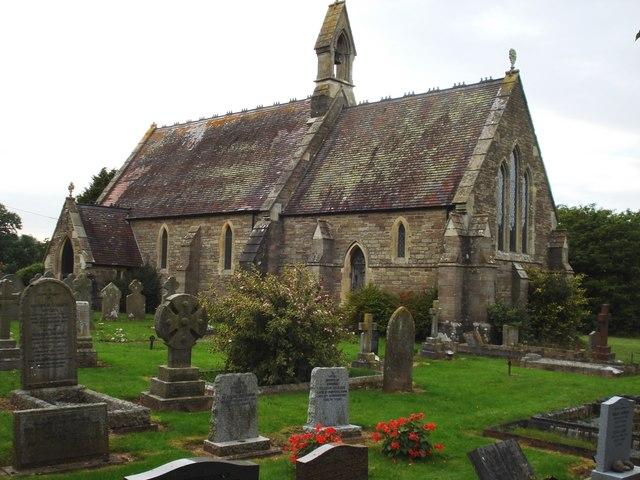

- Location within Herefordshire
- Area: 4.044 km^{2} (1.561 sq mi)
- Population: 61 (2001 census)
  - Density: 15/km^{2} (39/sq mi)
- Civil parish: Collington
- Unitary authority: County of Herefordshire
- Shire county: Herefordshire
- Region: West Midlands
- Country: England
- Sovereign state: United Kingdom
- Police: West Mercia
- Fire: Hereford and Worcester
- Ambulance: West Midlands

Collington is a village and civil parish 15 miles (24 km) north east of Hereford, in the county of Herefordshire, England. In 2001 the parish had a population of 61. The parish touches Edvin Loach and Saltmarshe, Edwyn Ralph, Stoke Bliss, Tedstone Wafer, Thornbury and Wolferlow. Collington shares a parish council with Edwyn Ralph and Thornbury called "Thornbury Group Parish Council".

== Landmarks ==
There are 7 listed buildings in Collington. Collington has a church called St Mary.

== History ==
The name "Collington" means 'Farm/settlement connected with Cola/Col'. Collington was recorded in the Domesday Book as Col(l)intune. On 24 March 1884 Combe's Wood Houses (which had 1 house in 1891) was transferred from the parish of Edvin Loach to the parish.
