= Tedstone Wafer =

Village in Herefordshire, England

Coordinates: 52.228158°N 2.4715608°W

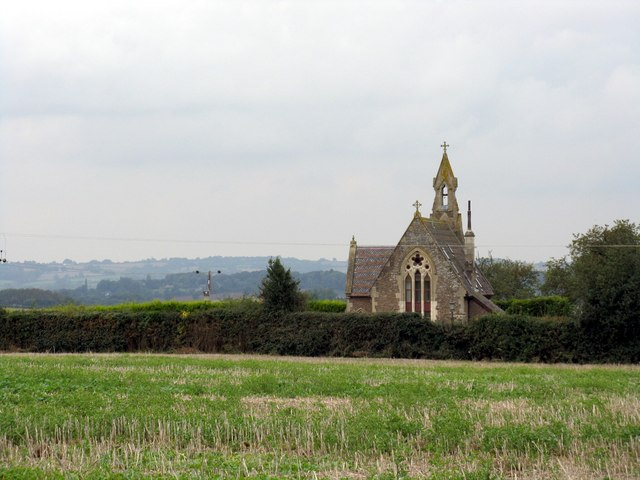

- Location within Herefordshire
- Area: 5.458 km^{2} (2.107 sq mi)
- Population: 112 (2011 census)
  - Density: 21/km^{2} (54/sq mi)
- Civil parish: Tedstone Wafer
- Unitary authority: County of Herefordshire
- Shire county: Herefordshire
- Region: West Midlands
- Country: England
- Sovereign state: United Kingdom
- Police: West Mercia
- Fire: Hereford and Worcester
- Ambulance: West Midlands

Tedstone Wafer is a village and civil parish 16 miles (26 km) north east of Hereford, in the county of Herefordshire, England. In 2011 the parish had a population of 112. The parish touches Collington, Edvin Loach and Saltmarshe, Lower Sapey, Norton, Tedstone Delamere and Wolferlow. Tedstone Wafer shares a parish council with Edvin Loach and Saltmarshe, Tedstone Delamere, Upper Sapey and Wolferlow called "North Bromyard Group Parish Council".

== Landmarks ==
There are 9 listed buildings in Tedstone Wafer. Tedstone Wafer has a church called St James that was formerly called St Mary and a village hall.

== History ==
The name "Tedstone" means 'Teod(i)'s thorn-tree', the "Wafer" part being that Robert le Wafre held land here in 1160-70. Tedstone Wafer was recorded in the Domesday Book as Tedesthorne/Tetistorp along with Tedstone Delamere.
