= Cradley =

Cradley may refer to:

- Cradley, Herefordshire, England
  - Cradley and Storridge, a civil parish formerly called just "Cradley"
- Cradley, West Midlands, a suburb of Halesowen in the West Midlands
- Cradley Heath, a small town in the Sandwell borough, in the West Midlands
- Cradley Heathens, a motorcycle speedway team from Dudley, England
