= Donnington, Herefordshire =

Village in Herefordshire, England

Coordinates: 52.0062°N 2.4253°W

Donnington
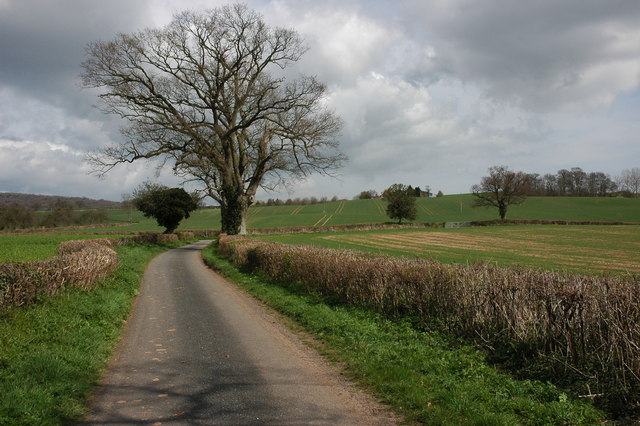
- Road through Donnington

- Location within Herefordshire
- OS grid reference: SO708342
- Unitary authority: Herefordshire
- Ceremonial county: Herefordshire
- Region: West Midlands
- Country: England
- Sovereign state: United Kingdom
- Post town: LEDBURY
- Postcode district: HR8
- Dialling code: 01531
- Police: West Mercia
- Fire: Hereford and Worcester
- Ambulance: West Midlands
- UK Parliament: North Herefordshire

Donnington is a village and civil parish near Ledbury.

== Parish church ==
The parish church is dedicated to Saint Mary. Donnington Hall is located here on the outskirts of the village.

In 1870–72, Donnington was described as:

"DONNINGTON, a parish in Ledbury district, Hereford; under the Malvern hills, at the boundary with Gloucester, 2¼ miles S of Ledbury town and [railway]. station. Post town, Ledbury. Acres, 808. Real property, £1, 566. [Population]. 105. Houses, 20. The property is divided among a few. The living is a rectory in the diocese of Hereford. Value, £209.* Patron, R. Webb, Esq. The church is old but good; and has a wooden tower."
