= Letton, West Herefordshire =

Village in Herefordshire, England

Coordinates: 52.1099°N 2.96502°W

Letton
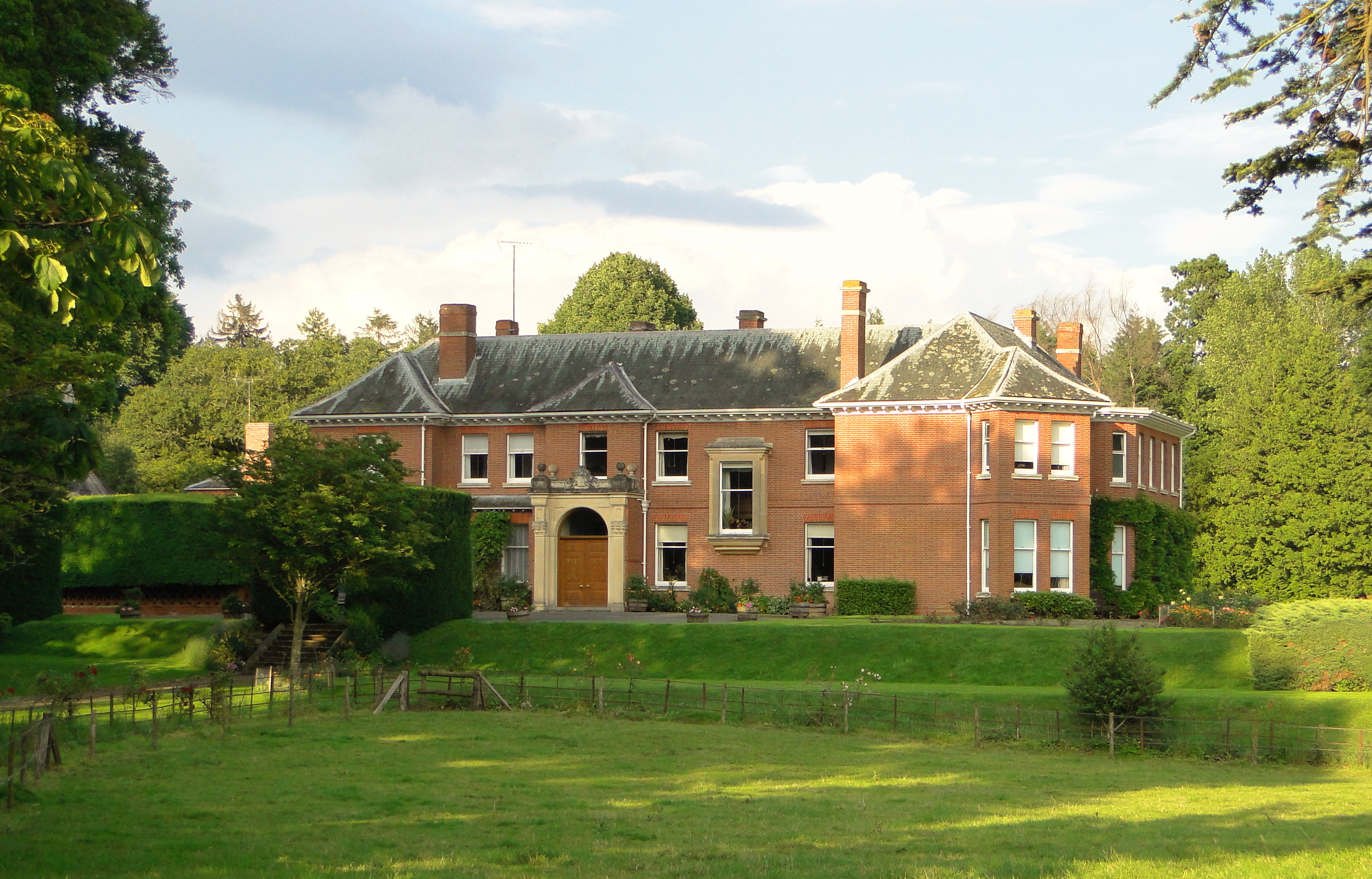
- Letton Court

- Location within Herefordshire
- OS grid reference: SO340461
  - London: 130 mi (210 km) ESE
- Unitary authority: Herefordshire
- Ceremonial county: Herefordshire
- Region: West Midlands
- Country: England
- Sovereign state: United Kingdom
- Post town: Hereford
- Postcode district: HR3
- Dialling code: 01544
- Police: West Mercia
- Fire: Hereford and Worcester
- Ambulance: West Midlands
- UK Parliament: North Herefordshire

Letton is a village and civil parish in west Herefordshire, England, and is approximately 11 miles (20 km) west-northwest from the city and county town of Hereford. The parish contains the village of Letton, the hamlet of Waterloo, and the farming hamlets of Hurstley and Kinley. The nearest towns are the market towns of Hay-on-Wye 7 miles (11 km) to the west, and Kington 7 miles to the north. Within Letton is the Grade I listed Church of St John the Baptist, and The Sturts nature reserve and Site of Special Scientific Interest.

== History ==
According to A Dictionary of British Place Names, Letton derives from probably "a leek enclosure or herb garden", from the Old English 'lēah' with 'tūn', in the Domesday Book written as "Letune", in 1242 as "Lettun", and in 1291 as Lecton.

Letton in the Domesday Book is listed as part of the hundred of Elsdon of Herefordshire and the land of Roger de Lacy, who was tenant-in-chief to king William I. The 1086 population was part of ten households, and included two slaves, one priest, and seven settlers, in a ploughland area defined by one lord's, and one men's plough teams. Resources included a mill. The lord in 1086 was Tezelin, who had received the manor from the 1066 lord, Edwy the noble.

=== 19th century ===
From the 1830s to the 1850s Letton was a township in the hundred of Stretford, and Hurstley in the hundred of Wolphy. Combined 1831 population was 163, with 95 of these in Letton. The ecclesiastical parish living was a rectory in the Archdeaconry and Diocese of Hereford; it was rated in the king's books—survey of the finances of English churches—at £6. 15s 7½d yearly in 1831. Letton was described as "on the road from Hereford to Hay and Brecon". It was part of the Weobley Union—poor relief and joint parish workhouse provision set up under the Poor Law Amendment Act 1834. The parish church of St John the Baptist was described as "an old stone building" with nave, one south transept, a chancel, and a tower with three bells. The chancel contained mural tablets to the Blisset family. In the 1850s the living was worth £235 yearly, with residence, and 18.58 acres (7.52 hectares) of glebe—an area of land used to support the parish church and priest—in the gift of the Rev Henry Blisset MA, who was also the incumbent, the lord of the manor and one of two chief landowners; the Blisset family provided lords of the manor and landowners until the 1890s. There was a small rectory house, built 1870, "by the road side", but the then incumbent lived in his family mansion close to the church [Letton Court]. There were parish charities valued at £462. By 1851 the population of Letton township (village), had fallen to 125, and the wider parish risen to 214, with 89 in Hurstley, in an overall area of 1,196 acres (484 hectares), Hurstley being of 420 acres (170 hectares). The soil and subsoil was described as clay, except at the south, by the river, as gravel and alluvial soil. Reported in the parish was a barrow. There were five farmers, two of whom were at Hurstley. Post was processed through Hereford, which was the nearest money order office.

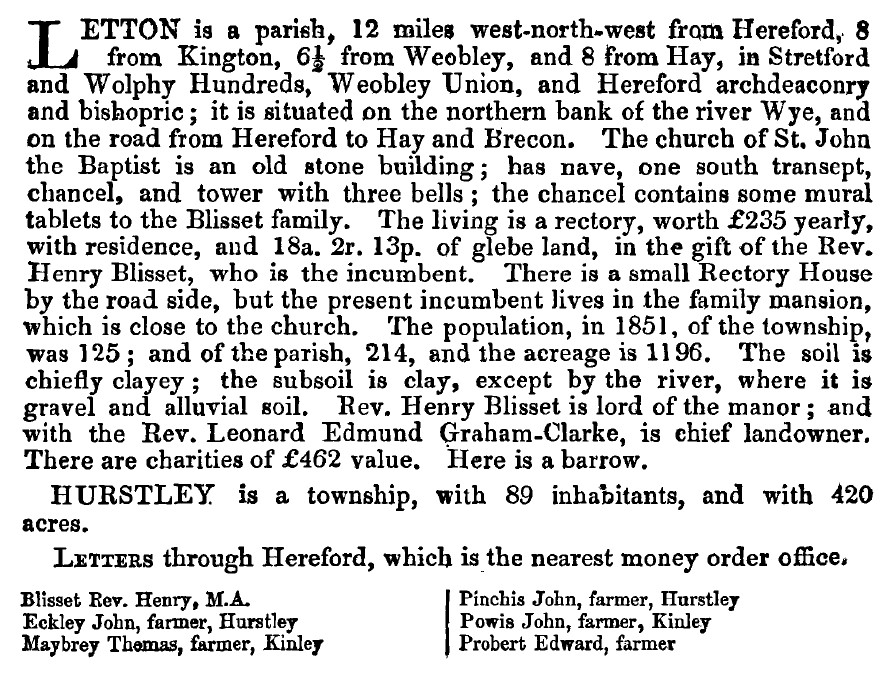
Letton in 1858

By the early 1870s the township and a parish was in Weobly district (administrative subdivision) of Herefordshire county, and by the 1880s, in the Northern division. Letton was 1 mile (2 km), south-southwest of Kinnersley railway station, and 2 miles (3 km) Eardisley railway station, both on the Hereford, Hay and Brecon Railway, opened between 1862 and 1864. Post was still processed under Hereford. Population of Letton township in 1871 was 137 within 33 houses, the parish total being 238 in 53 houses, the parish area remaining as earlier. Part of the land was reported as under hops. The value of the priest's parish living had reduced from £235 yearly twenty years earlier, to £221. Parish charities of £689 were shared with Staunton on Wye. About £100 yearly was distributed to the poor in provisions, clothing and fuel. By the 1880s the parish, already in the Weobley Union, was also in the Weobley petty sessional division, and Hereford county court district. The parish was now part of the Weobley rural deanery. The church was described as of "mixed styles, with slight traces of Norman work", and containing "mural tablets and memorial windows to the Blisset family, and... some old brasses to the Parrys". An American organ was added to St John the Baptist's in 1875, and was restored in 1883, when "several very interesting architectural features were discovered", the cost defrayed by Rev H. Blisset MA, JP, who was the patron. The parish register dates to 1560. The rectory was now supported by a yearly tithe-rent of £253. Tithes, typically one-tenth of the produce or profits of the land given to the rector for his services, had been commuted in 1841 under the 1836 Tithe Commutation Act. The rectory house itself was built in 1870, and Letton Court, the seat of the Blissets was rebuilt in 1863 of red brick in "the Mediaeval style". Parish and township population in 1881 was 175. Chief crops grown were wheat, barley and turnips. Although post was still processed under Hereford, the nearest money order and telegraph office was at Eardisley. There was an Endowed mixed and infants National School, supported by the still existing Jarvis' Charity based at Staunton on Wye; the school founded for 75 pupils had an average attendance of 36, "of whom 20 are clothed". Income from the charity amounted to about £2,000 yearly, and distributed according to a chancery scheme of 1852 in the proportions of 13, 11, and 6, among the inhabitants of Bredwardine, Staunton on Wye, and Lefton respectively. The school provided for a residence for the school master of the mixed school, with the infants taught by a school mistress. Occupations in the 1880s included five farmers, with two at Kinley and one at Hurstley. There was a land agent at Letton court farm, a head gardener at Hurstley, and a sawyer at Kinley.

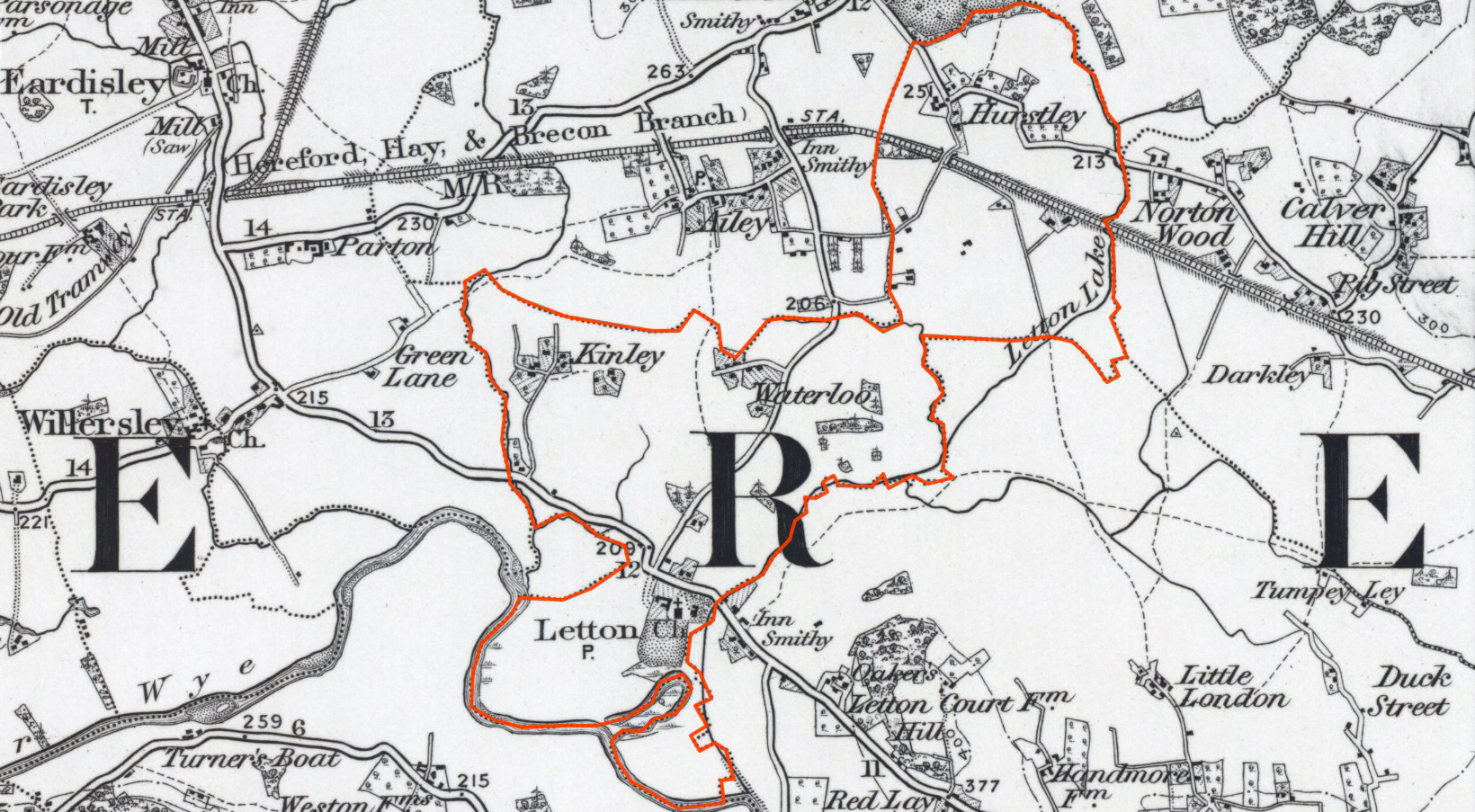
Letton in 1898

By the 1890s Letton was part of the Kinnersley and Weobley polling district and electoral division of Herefordshire. In 1881 population was 175 in 45 inhabited houses, families, or separate occupiers; population in 1891 was 147. The area of the parish is reported at a reduced size of 1,177 acres (476 hectares) 1890, and 1,215 acres (492 hectares) in 1891. Products grown were chiefly wheat, barley, and roots, with some pasture. The rector of the parish was also rector of the adjacent parish of Willersley. Letton Court, situated adjacent to the church, was the seat of the Rev. Henry Blisset, M.A. (Balliol College, Oxford), and member of the Carlton Club, until 1893. Letton Court was now owned by county magistrate, lord of the manor, chief landowner, philanthropist, and church patron Tom Millet Dew (died 1931, age 72). The house was destroyed by fire in 1924, with the loss of Blisset property and heirlooms; it was rebuilt between 1925 and 1926. Post in the 1890s was still under Hereford as post town, with delivery and collection by mail-cart. Staunton on Wye was now the nearest money order and telegraph office. Operating in the parish were three carriers—transporter of trade goods, with sometimes people, between different settlements—to Hereford: two on Wednesday and Saturday stopping at the Red Lion and Maidenhead, and one on Saturday stopping at Red Lion. A further Saturday carrier to Hay stopped at The Ship. Professions and private residents in the parish were two priests, two churchwardens, the parish clerk, and the schoolmaster and mistress. Commercial occupations included nine farmers, one a cottage farmer who was also the parish clerk, and another also a carpenter. There was a sawyer, and two head gardeners, one at Letton Court and another at Hurstley. By 1913 The National School was now a Public Elementary School, still endowed by the Jarvis' Charity, with an average attendance of 33, of whom 16 were clothed. The parish register was then dated to 1673. The parish priests annual living had dropped from the 1870s income of £221, to £192 before the First World War. The parish had its own post and telegraph office, with Letton letters collected and delivered by "motor" through Hereford, and Hurstley through Kinnersley. Staunton on Wye had become the nearest money order office. Resident was the schoolmaster, parish priest and Tom Millet Dew. Commercial listing included eleven farmers. One was a cottage farmer, one at Waterloo, two at Kinley, and three Hurstley. There was also a farm bailiff to Tom Millett Dew.

== Geography ==
The village and civil parish of Letton is in west Herefordshire, 6 miles (10 km) east from the Welsh border and 11 miles (20 km) west-northwest from the city of Hereford. The parish is approximately, at its widest, 3.5 miles (6 km) from north-east to south-west and 1.5 miles (2 km) north-west to south-east, with an area of approximately 1,262 acres (510 ha), and an approximate height of 200 feet (60 m) above sea level at the south-west to 230 feet (70 m) at the north-east. The parish is divided into two distinct parts, north-east and south-west, separated by a restricted land bridge of 150 yards (140 m) wide. Adjacent parishes are Kinnersley surrounding the north and north east, Norton Canon at the east, Staunton on Wye at the east and south-east, Bredwardine at the south, and Eardisley at the west.

The parish is rural, of farm complexes, fields, managed woodland and coppices, streams, ponds, lakes, isolated and dispersed businesses and residential properties. The village of Letton is at the south, with the farming hamlets of Waterloo at 1,400 yards (1,300 m), and Hurstley at 1.3 miles (2 km), north from the village. The parish is within the floodplain of the River Wye; the parish boundary at the south, beyond the village, defined by the Wye flowing west to east, includes the oxbow lake of Horse Shoe Bend. Flowing into the Wye is Letton Lake, a stream which rises two parishes north in Almeley, and which roughly defines the Letton boundary with Staunton on Wye and Kinnersley. A further stream entering the Wye defines the western boundary with Eardisley, after flowing south through Kinnersley.

The only major road in the parish is the A438, which runs through Letton village, and locally from Hereford to Whitney-on-Wye, and then over the border into Wales. A minor road runs north from the A438 at Letton village to Kinnersley. At the north of the parish, through Hurstley, runs a minor road from Kinnersley Castle at the north to Norton Canon at the east. All other routes are country lanes, bridleways, farm tracks, property entrances, and footpaths.

== Governance ==
The parish is represented in the lowest tier of UK governance by two elected councillors on the fourteen-member Kinnersley and District Group Parish Council, which also includes councillors from the parishes of Kinnersley, Norton Canon, and Sarnesfield. As Herefordshire is a unitary authority—no district council between parish and county councils—the parish is represented as part of the Castle Ward, to Herefordshire County Council. Letton is represent in the UK parliament as part of the North Herefordshire constituency.

In 1974 Letton became part of the now defunct Leominster District of the county of Hereford and Worcester, instituted under the Local Government Act 1972. In 2002 the parish, with the parishes of Almeley, Brilley, Brobury with Monnington on Wye, Eardisley, Huntington, Kinnersley, Norton Canon, Sarnesfield, Staunton on Wye, Whitney-on-Wye, and Willersley and Winforton, was reassessed as part of Castle Ward which elected one councillor to Herefordshire district council.

== Community ==
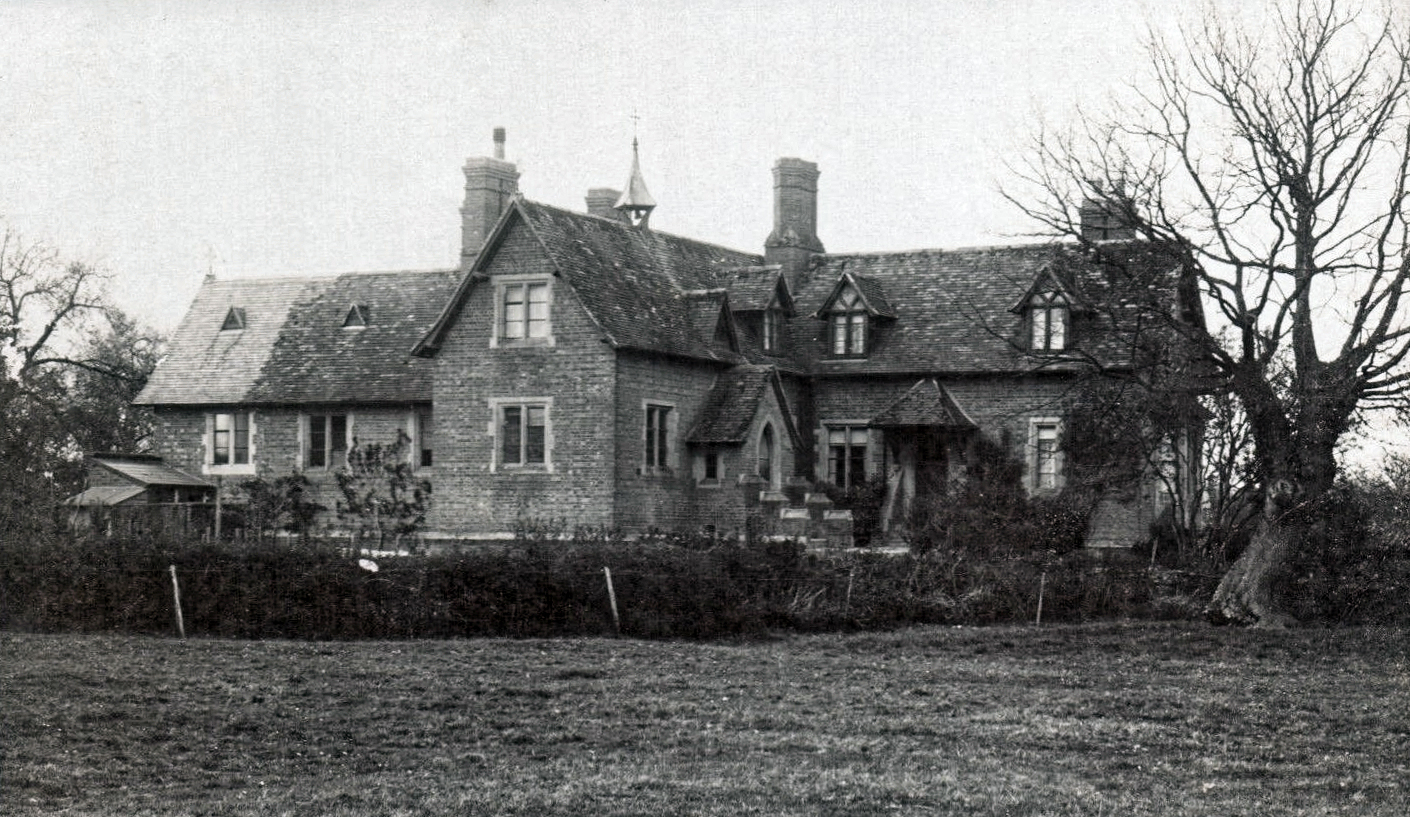
Former National school at Letton

No shopping amenities exist in the parish. Businesses include a fishery (angling), leather goods supplier, a rental holiday home property, and two major farms: one on Kinley Lane at the east, and one at Hurstley on Pig Street at the north. The parish church, in Letton village, is dedicated to St John the Baptist, and is part of the Weobley and Staunton Group of Parishes. Also within the village is a commercial angling lake, part of the Letton Court estate, and a timber merchant.

Letton falls under the Wye Valley NHS Trust. The closest hospitals are Bishops Castle Community Hospital at Bishops Castle, 7 miles (11 km) to the north-west, and Ludlow Community Hospital at Ludlow, 8 miles (13 km) to the south-east, with Hereford County Hospital, the closest major NHS hospital, at Hereford.

The nearest school for primary education is Staunton-on-Wye Endowed Primary School (state school also supported by trust grants), at Staunton-On-Wye, 2 miles (3 km) south-east, and Eardisley C.E. Primary School at Eardisley, 2 miles north-west. For secondary education the parish falls within the catchment area of Lady Hawkins' School at Kington, 6 miles (10 km) to the north-west. The school at Letton had survived until 1955, when it closed.

The parish is served by two bus routes, both running along the A438: one linking Builth Wells and Hereford; the other linking Hereford, through Eardisley to Almeley. The closest rail connection is on the Welsh Marches line at Hereford railway station 11 miles (18 km) to the east-southeast.

== Landmarks ==
The parish contains one Grade I and twelve Grade II listed buildings, including the parish church, barns, cottages, houses, farmhouses, ancillary structures, a milestone, and a bridge.

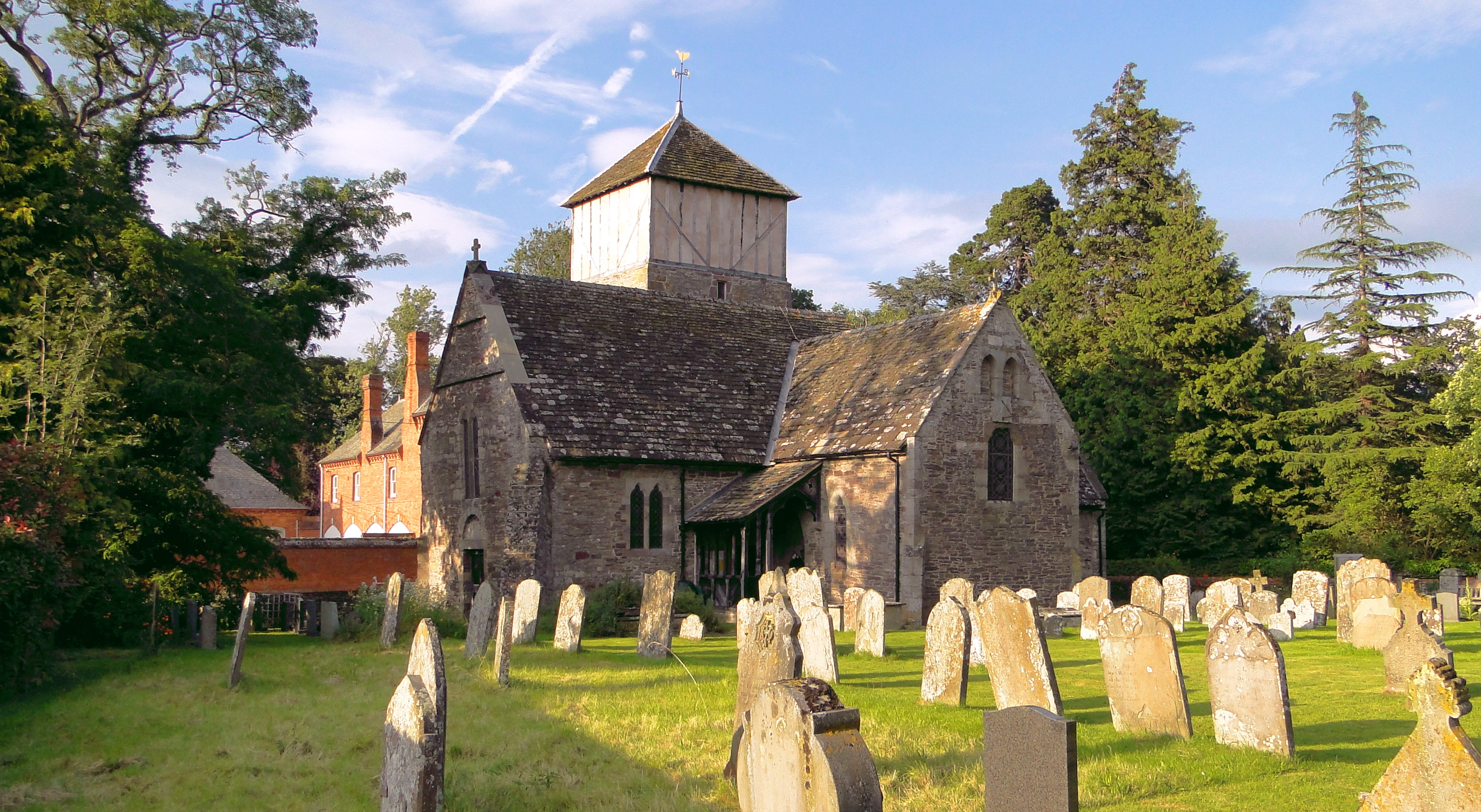
Church of St John the Baptist

In Letton village is the Grade I listed Church of St John the Baptist, south from the A438 on Church Lane (grid reference SO3351446453), which dates to the late 11th century, the 12th century, with further changes in the 13th and 14th, an 1883 restoration, and 20th-century additions, and is constructed from sandstone rubble, with tufa sandstone dressings and Welsh slate roofing. It comprises a nave, chancel, south transept, a 20th-century oak south porch and a tower with a ring of three bells. The tower is of four stages, the bottom three of stone, the fourth timber-framed with pyramidical roof. The chancel and nave interiors have restored waggon roofs. The chancel contains a 13th-century piscina and, on the north wall, a "segmentally headed tomb recess with pendant and trefoiled cusps". The oak communion table is 17th century, as are the choir stalls consisting of five benches and two seats. There is a wall monument on the north wall to John Freeman (died 1816), and brass plaques to "Edward Chamberlain, died 1712; Joane Parker, died 1697; the Revd Rowland Parry, died 1761; his wife Elizabeth, died 1736; and son Harry, died 1722". The east chancel stained glass window, restored in 1981, is geometrically patterned and dedicated to Elizabeth Blisset (died 1867). Further windows are of similar design and are dedicated to Mary Blisset (died 1882), and Charles Blisset (died 1859). On the north wall of the chancel is a reader's desk dating to the 17th century. In the nave is a 13th-century octagonal-bowled font. A further 14th-century piscina is in the south transept.

In St John's churchyard, 10 yards (9 m) south from the nave, is a listed chest tomb of sandstone ashlar (grid reference SO3350646441), inscribed to Henry Baker (died 1764). At 22 yards (20 m) west from the church is the listed Gardener's Cottage, dating to the late 16th to 17th century (grid reference SO3347846444). Sitting on a sandstone base of rectangular plan, it is timber-framed with plaster infills, of one storey with attic and tile roof with gabled dormers. The windows are casement. A two-storey porch is on the east side, being incorporated into the central window. At about 130 yards (100 m) north from the church is a listed early 19th-century bridge, from the A438 and over a roadside drain (grid reference SO3357446564). Of sandstone construction with sandstone dressings, the span is of two semi-circular arches, with plain parapets above. There are seven foot high sandstone pinnacles running off the parapet at the south, church side.

At about 1,100 yards (1,000 m) north-west from the church, and at the junction of the A438 with Kinley Lane (grid reference SO3278347131), is Hackmoor Hall. Dating probably to the 17th century, with later additions and alterations. Built of brick infilled timber framing, and with a sandstone gable on the west side, the house is aligned roughly east–west, rectangular in footprint, and of one storey with an attic. The concrete-tiled roof incorporates late 20th-century dormers with casement windows, the lower floor with a gabled porch. The interior has 17th-century entrance hall panelling.

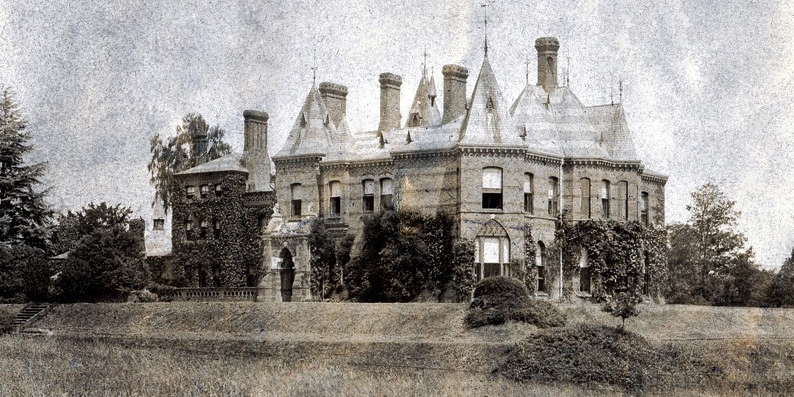
Letton Court before 1883

Although not listed, the present Letton Court, 90 yards (80 m) east from the parish church (grid reference SO3361846419), is the site of the former Letton Court, designed in 1859 by George Frederick Bodley (attributed in other sources to Mr Thomas Teulon or Samuel Sanders Teulon), on behalf of the Blissett family. The house was completed in medieval style by 1863, taking two years. The family became involved with angling, particularly salmon, reflected today by the fishery named after the Letton Court estate. The estate was acquired in 1889, through marriage, to the Dew family. In 1924 the house burnt down in two hours, caused by a workman's blow torch. The house staff attempted to stem the blaze, but destruction was complete before the fire brigade attended; what remained was the "north-east service wing, three strong rooms used to store silver and estate papers, and most of the wine-cellar". By 1926 a new Letton Court had been built on the site, its estate incorporating 768 acres (311 ha) of arable land and pasture. The estate in 2011 was on the market at a guide price of £11m.

At Waterloo hamlet, 200 yards (200 m) west off the road to Kinnersley, and 1,200 yards (1,000 m) north from the junction with the A438, is Waterloo Cottages grid reference SO3391747651). The two conjoined cottages are timber-framed with brick and roughcast woven infill, and probably dates to the 18th century, with casement windows and flagstone floors. Although called Waterloo Cottages, after the Battle of Waterloo, the buildings appear to pre-date 1815. Also at Waterloo is The Sturts Nature Reserve, largely a Site of Special Scientific Interest sitting on the floodplain of the River Wye and subject to seasonal flooding. It comprises three areas covering groups of fields as wetland and "unimproved grassland" which surround the hamlet: Sturts North of 52 acres (21 ha), East of 15 acres (6 ha), and South of 40 acres (16 ha). The Reserve contains a biodiversity of wild flora species, insects and birds, some nationally declining.

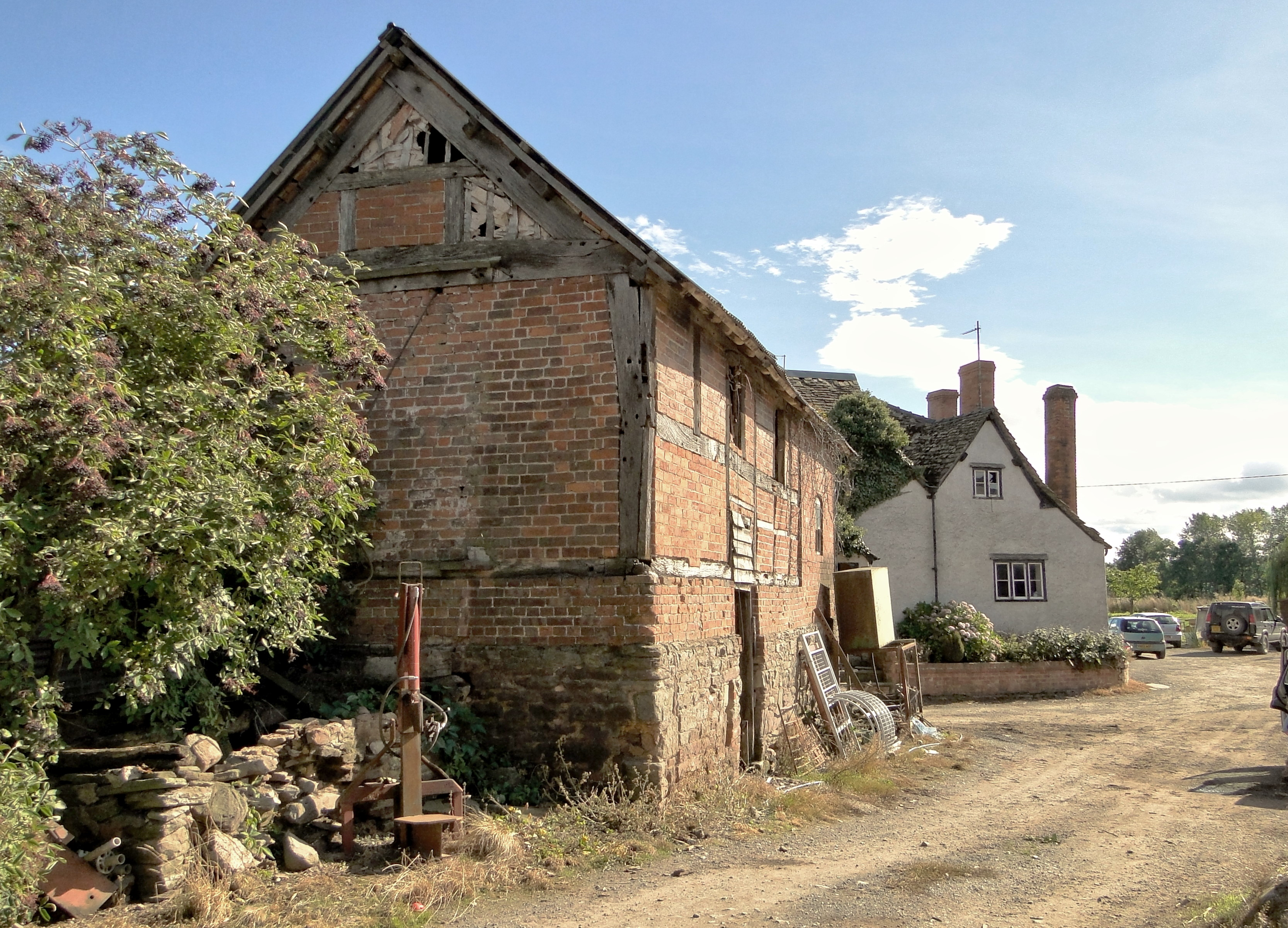
Barn and Hurstley Court

At the north of the parish in Hurstley are six Grade II listed buildings, in a complex centred on Hurstley Court. The probably 17th-century farmhouse of Hurstley Court (grid reference SO3391747651), is of two storeys and attic, timber-framed with roughcast rendering, and of T-plan with cross-wing at the north-west, and of three gabled bays, with sandstone slate roofs, a gabled porch, and casement windows. At 45 yards (40 m) north-west from Hurstley Court (grid reference SO3486048957), is a late 17th- to early 18th-century barn, of timber-framing with wattle and daub infill and partly weatherboarded, on a sandstone and brick plinth. Of irregular plan and partly two storeys, the roof is of corrugated iron and Welsh slate. There are two opposing doored entries capable of accommodating wagons (the opening from ground to eaves), and a further stable door. The roof interior is trussed.

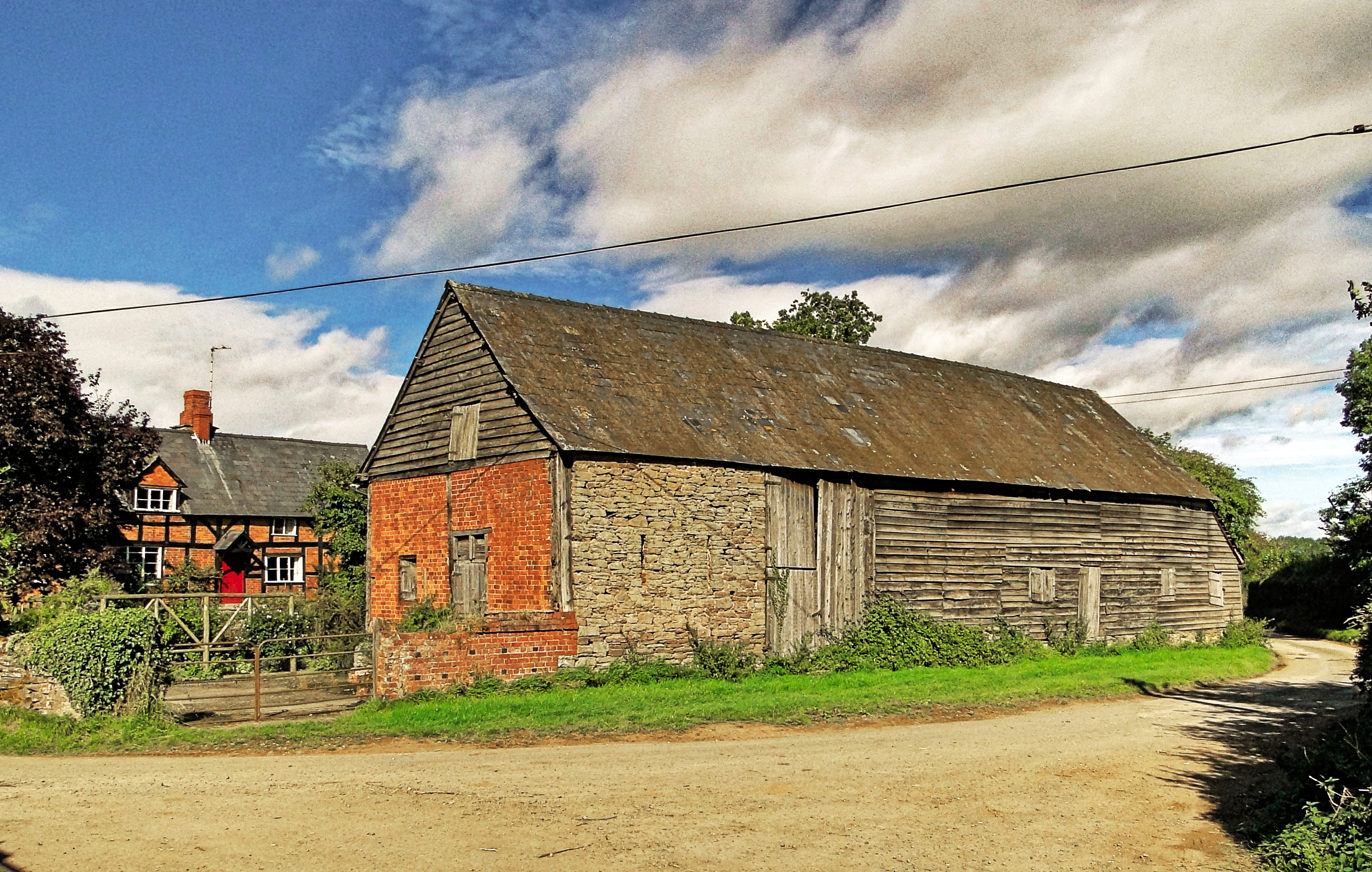
Barn north-east from Hurstley Court

At 45 yards north-east from Hurstley Court is a further barn of the same date, again of timber-framing with part wattle and daub infill and weatherboards, a wagon entry, and a corrugated iron and Welsh slate roof on interior trussing, on a sandstone and brick plinth; its west gable is a 19th-century brick rebuild. At 22 yards (20 m) north from this barn is Hurstley Farmhouse (grid reference SO3491549013), dating to probably the 17th century and with later changes. It is two-storeyed with attic and cellar, of T-plan with a western cross-wing, and timber-framed with brick infill. The roof shows a central sandstone rubble brick chimney stack, and a roof dormer on the south side. Windows are casements ranging from 18th to 20th century. The central main entrance door is mid-19th-century. South of the complex, and 130 yards (100 m) south from Hurstley Court (grid reference SO3495048838), is the listed 17th-century Little Hurstley with an attached listed 18th- or early 19th-century ciderhouse. Little Hurstley house is of two storeys, rectangular plan, and a combination of brick and timber-framing with plaster and brick infill with some weatherboarding. The roof is of sandstone slate with a brick stack at the south end gable. Windows are casement. The interior contains two ground floor rooms with "deeply chamfered beams". The attached weatherboarded ciderhouse contains a complete mill and press. "The former has a trough about eight feet in diameter formed in two pieces, divided along the diameter. Attached to the mill wheel is a yoke and harness". To the east from the complex about 150 yards (100 m) along Pig Street is the last listed and late 17th- early 18th-century barn (grid reference SO3504749026). Of rectangular plan, 100 feet (30.5 m) by 24 feet (7.3 m), it is of seven-bays, timber-framed, and clad with weatherboarding, sitting on a sandstone plinth, and with a modern corrugated iron roof. The wagon entry is off-centre to the east. The interior has a central division running under the roof ridge. In 2009 the barn was in a dilapidated state.
