= Edvin Loach =

Village in Herefordshire, England

Coordinates: 52.222°N 2.494°W

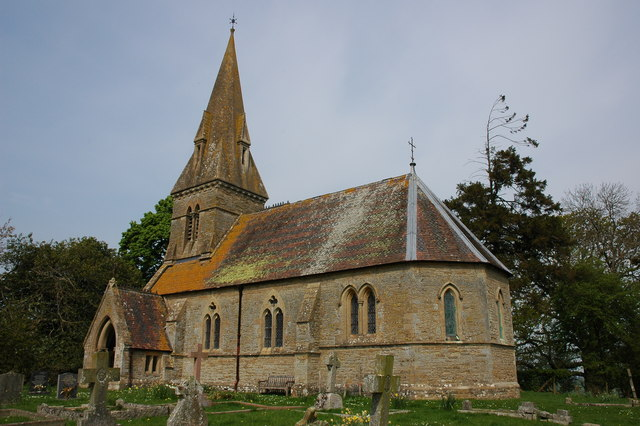
- Edvin Loach 19th-century church

- Location within Herefordshire
- Civil parish: Edvin Loach and Saltmarshe
- Unitary authority: County of Herefordshire
- Ceremonial county: Herefordshire
- Region: West Midlands
- Country: England
- Sovereign state: United Kingdom

Edvin Loach, also Edwin Loach, is a village and former civil parish, now in the parish of Edvin Loach and Saltmarshe, in east Herefordshire, England, and about 3 miles (5 km) north of the town of Bromyard, and east from Edwyn Ralph civil parish. Until 1893 the parish formed an exclave of Worcestershire within Herefordshire. In 1961, the parish had a population of 18. On 1 April 1986, the parish was abolished and merged with Saltmarshe to form "Edvin Loach & Saltmarshe".

The old church at Edvin Loach was built in the mid-11th century or later and was dedicated to St Giles. It is built within the earthworks of a Norman motte-and-bailey castle. Later it was re-dedicated to St Mary. The old church gradually became dilapidated, though its roof was still intact as late as the 1890s. It is in the guardianship of English Heritage. The new St Mary's Church, designed by Victorian architect Sir George Gilbert Scott in 1860, stands next to the ruins of the old church. It is an example of 19th-century church architecture designed in Early English style.

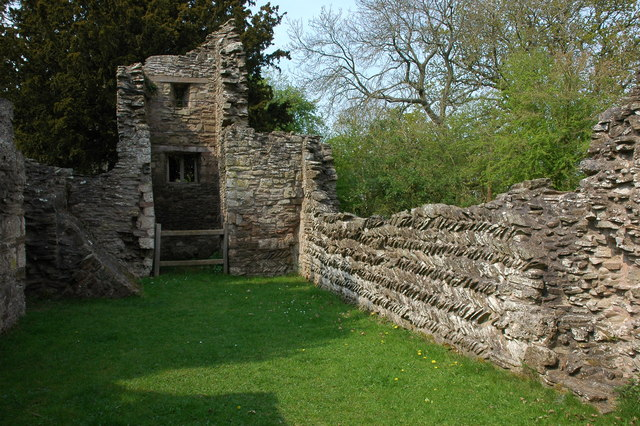
Edvin Loach old church
