= Wellington Heath =

Coordinates: 52.059°N 2.423°W

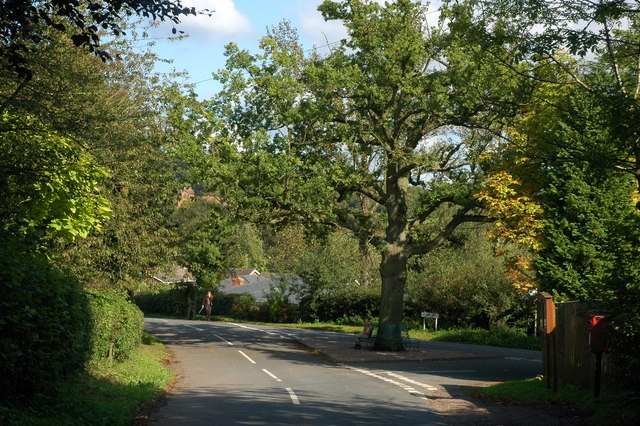

- Location within Herefordshire
- Population: 440
- Civil parish: Wellington Heath
- Unitary authority: Herefordshire
- Ceremonial county: Herefordshire
- Region: West Midlands
- Country: England
- Sovereign state: United Kingdom
- Post town: LEDBURY
- Postcode district: HR8
- Dialling code: 01531
- Police: West Mercia
- Fire: Hereford and Worcester
- Ambulance: West Midlands
- UK Parliament: North Herefordshire

Wellington Heath is a small village and civil parish in Herefordshire, England, approximately 1.5 miles (2.4 km) north of Ledbury. The population was recorded by the 2011 census at 440.

The village contains a church, Christ Church. There is a public house, the Farmers Arms.

The Herefordshire Trail long-distance footpath passes through the village, as does The National Byway.

The route of the derelict Herefordshire and Gloucestershire Canal passes through the western part of the parish.

Wellington Heath has a parish council. The parish, together with the north part of the parish of Ledbury, forms the ward of Ledbury North, which returns one elected councillor to Herefordshire Council.
