= Edwyn Ralph =

Village in Herefordshire, England

Coordinates: 52.221887°N 2.5239009°W

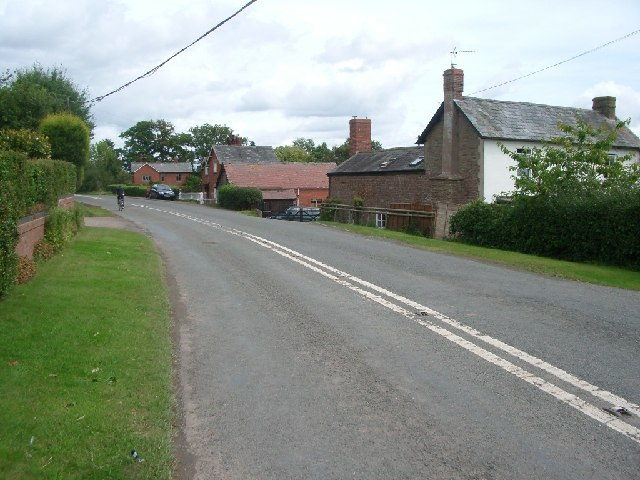

- Location within Herefordshire
- Area: 4.965 km^{2} (1.917 sq mi)
- Population: 192 (2011 Census)
  - Density: 39/km^{2} (100/sq mi)
- Civil parish: Edwyn Ralph
- Unitary authority: Herefordshire
- Ceremonial county: Herefordshire
- Region: West Midlands
- Country: England
- Sovereign state: United Kingdom
- Post town: BROMYARD
- Postcode district: HR7
- Dialling code: 01885
- Police: West Mercia
- Fire: Hereford and Worcester
- Ambulance: West Midlands
- UK Parliament: North Herefordshire

Edwyn Ralph or Edvin Ralph is a village and civil parish 14 miles (23 km) north east of Hereford, in the county of Herefordshire, England. In 2011 the parish had a population of 192. The parish touches Bromyard and Winslow, Collington, Edvin Loach and Saltmarshe, Norton, Thornbury and Wacton. Edwyn Ralph shares a parish council with Collington and Thornbury called "Thornbury Group Parish Council".

== Landmarks ==
There are 16 listed buildings in Edwyn Ralph. Edwyn Ralph has a church called St Michael and a village hall.

== History ==
The name "Edvin" means 'Gedda's fen'. Edwyn Ralph was recorded in the Domesday Book as Gedeuen. On 24 March 1884 Upper Horton Farm (which had 1 house in 1891) was transferred from the parish of Wacton to the parish and Butterley Houses (which had 6 houses in 1891) were transferred to Wacton.
