= Bromyard Downs =

Common land in Herefordshire, England

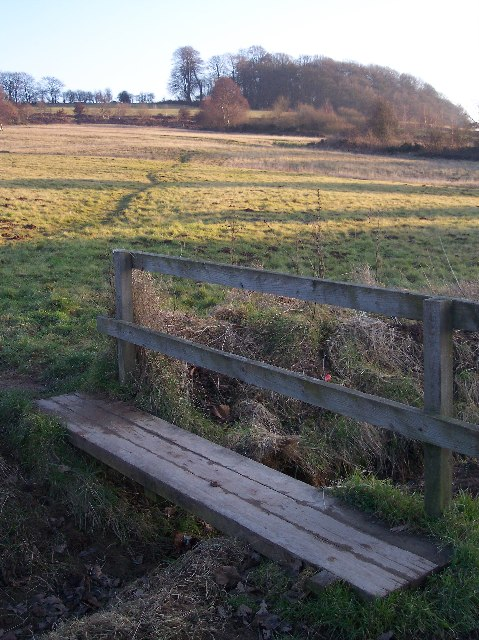
- looking north towards the crest of Bromyard Downs
- Interactive map of Bromyard Downs
- Type: Common land
- Location: north of the town
- Nearest city: Bromyard
- Coordinates: 52.196°N 2.489°W
- Operator: Herefordshire Council

Bromyard Downs shown within Herefordshire
(grid reference SO667554)

Bromyard Downs is an area of registered common land, and a scattered settlement, just outside the town of Bromyard in Herefordshire, England. The 114 hectares of downs rise to over 700 ft where a plateau dominates the escarpment overlooking the town. The downs are a combination of gorse and grassland, wood and coppice.

As of 2019 there were 93 registered commoners, some of whom with livestock grazing rights under the Commons Act 2006. Rights under the act include pasturage, estovers and turbary.

== History ==
It originated in the ancient past from a parcel of manorial waste ground that belonged to the feudal manor of Bromyard. The common has changed hands many times. The medieval period was one of prosperity for the tanners and clothiers of Bromyard, in a part of England where there were more sheep than people. Livestock used to graze on the downs, where people with common rights could share the grass. During the agricultural revolution its ownership was shared by various aristocratic owners, including from nearby Buckenhill Manor, and Brockhampton Court.

A feature on the common is the outline of an old disused horse racecourse that was created by soldiers and tenant farmers returning from the Napoleonic Wars.

During World War One Bromyard had an internment camp, and many housed there were Sinn Fein-IRA. The Second World War brought preparative measures for any possible German invasion, allowing the Mercian Marquis to construct underground bunkers in the dense forest.

== Amenities ==
Based on Bromyard Downs are voluntary and community groups, a caravan club, and The Royal Oak public house, a black and white half-timbered house dating back at least 300 years.
