= Orleton =

Village in Herefordshire, England

Coordinates: 52.30057°N 2.74492°W

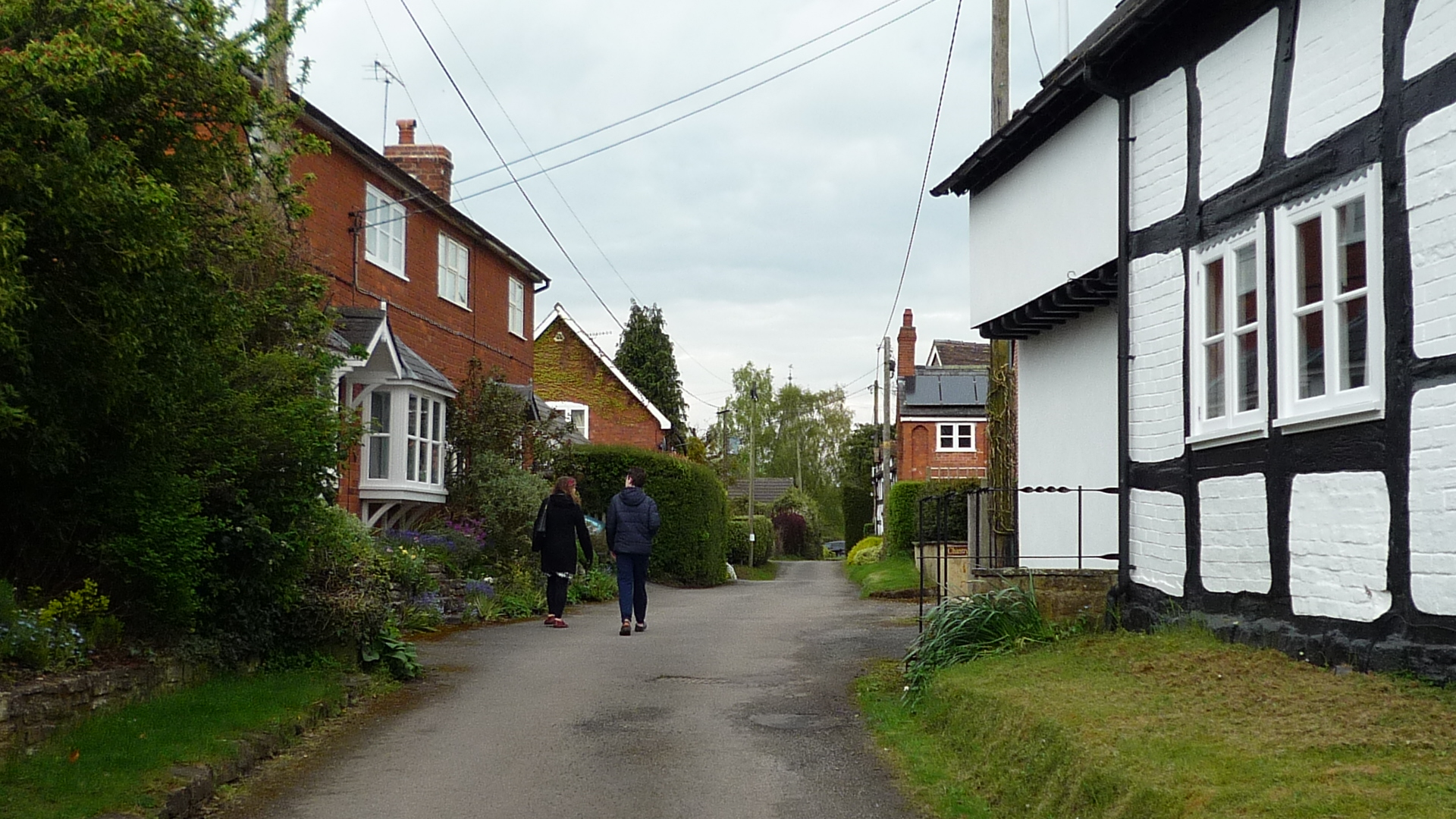
- Church Lane

- Location within Herefordshire
- Population: 794 (2011 census)
- Unitary authority: Herefordshire
- Shire county: Herefordshire
- Region: West Midlands
- Country: England
- Sovereign state: United Kingdom
- Post town: Ludlow
- Postcode district: SY8
- Police: West Mercia
- Fire: Hereford and Worcester
- Ambulance: West Midlands
- UK Parliament: North Herefordshire

Orleton is a small village and civil parish in northern Herefordshire, England, at grid reference SO493672. The population of the civil parish at the 2011 census was 794. The village is midway between the market towns of Ludlow and Leominster, both 5 miles (8.0 km) away.

== History ==
In the Domesday Book, the ancient settlement was recorded as Arleton, referring to the alders.

=== St George's Church ===
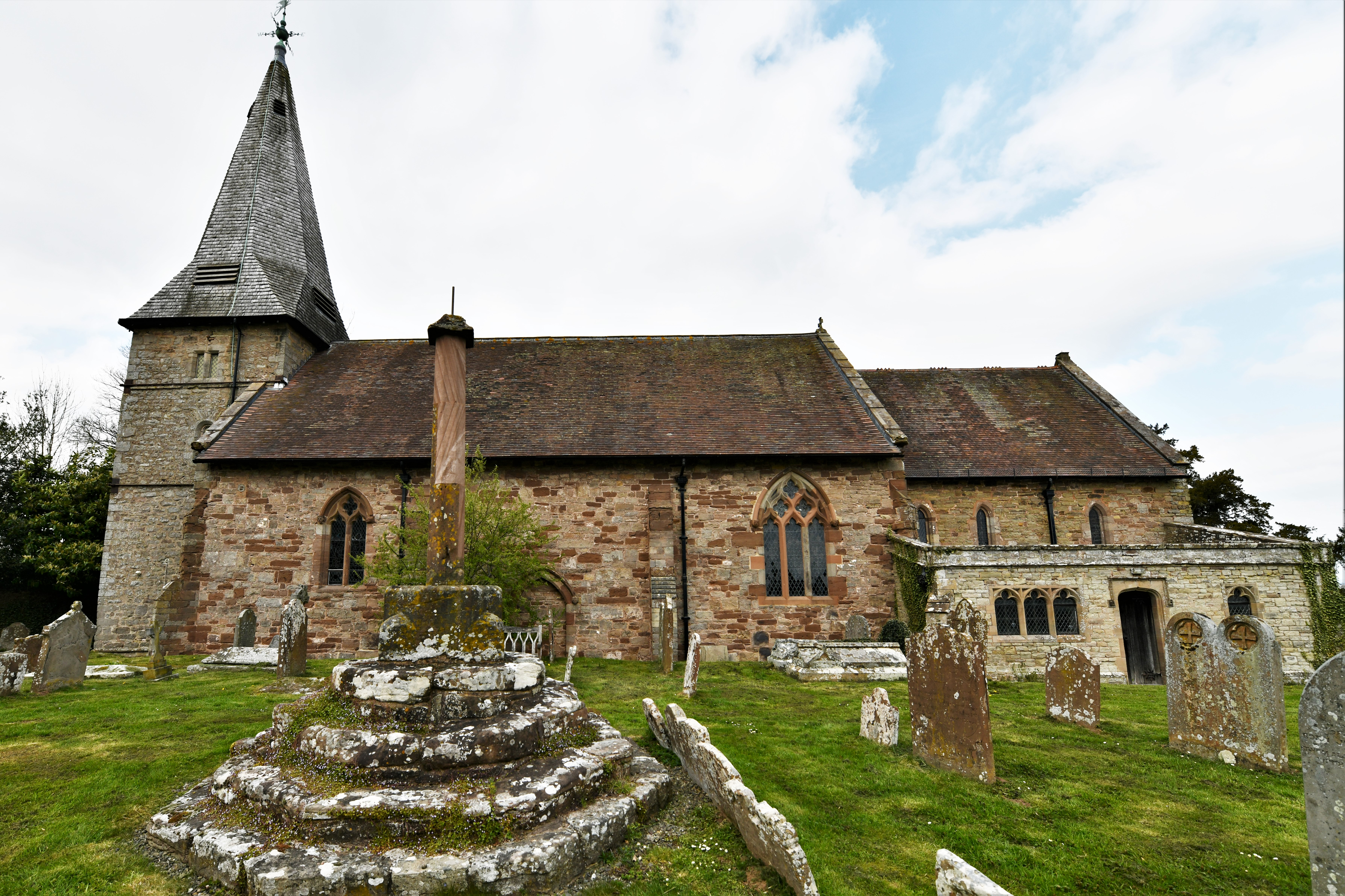
St George's Church

The village church is dedicated to St George, and contains a Norman nave, 14th-century stained-glass windows, and a 13th-century west tower. The c.1200 door was moved and reset, The early 13th-century chancel has lancet windows. The tie-beam roof may be 14th century. The vestry is Victorian. Fittings include a c.1100 Norman font with nine disciples standing under arches, a 17th-century Jacobean pulpit, two thirteenth-century dug-out chests, a clock dating from about 1700, and a Norman carving of a dragon, later used as a clock weight.

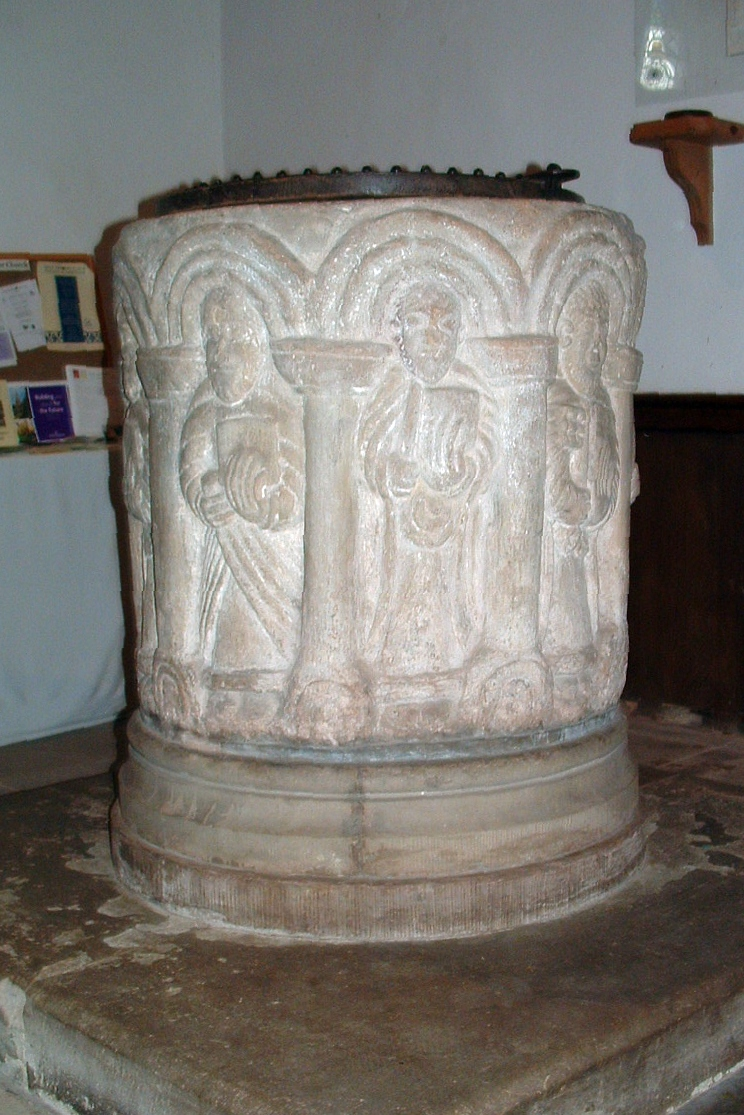
Norman font

== Notable people ==
The 13th-century Bishop of Hereford, Adam Orleton, took his name from this village, may have been born here, and was a constant supporter of Roger Mortimer, the lord of the manor.
