= Stoke Bliss =

Village in Worcestershire, England

Coordinates: 52.263722°N 2.503649°W

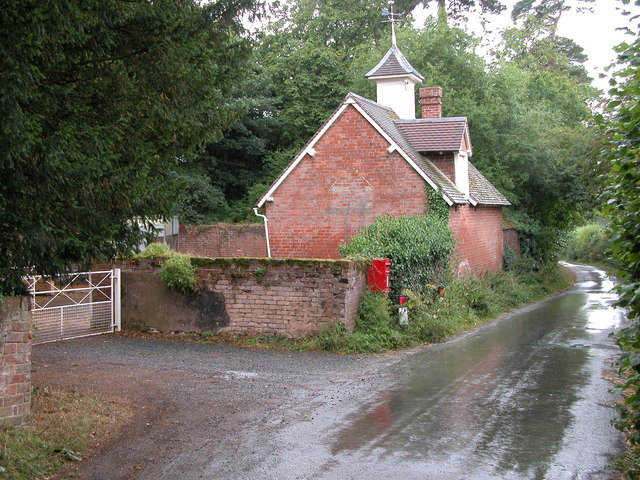
- Roadside building in Stoke Bliss

- Location within Worcestershire
- OS grid reference: SO657629
  - London: 115.16 Miles
- Civil parish: Stoke Bliss
- District: Malvern Hills
- Shire county: Worcestershire
- Region: West Midlands
- Country: England
- Sovereign state: United Kingdom
- Post town: TENBURY WELLS
- Postcode district: WR15
- Dialling code: 01885
- Police: West Mercia
- Fire: Hereford and Worcester
- Ambulance: West Midlands
- UK Parliament: West Worcestershire

Stoke Bliss is a small village and civil parish (with a shared parish council with neighbouring Kyre and Bockleton) in the Malvern Hills district of the county of Worcestershire, England.

The name Stoke derives from the Old English stoc meaning 'place'. The affix Bliss derives from William de Bledis of Calvados, who held the village during the 13th century.
