= Thornbury, Herefordshire =

Village in Herefordshire, England

Coordinates: 52.234°N 2.556°W

Thornbury
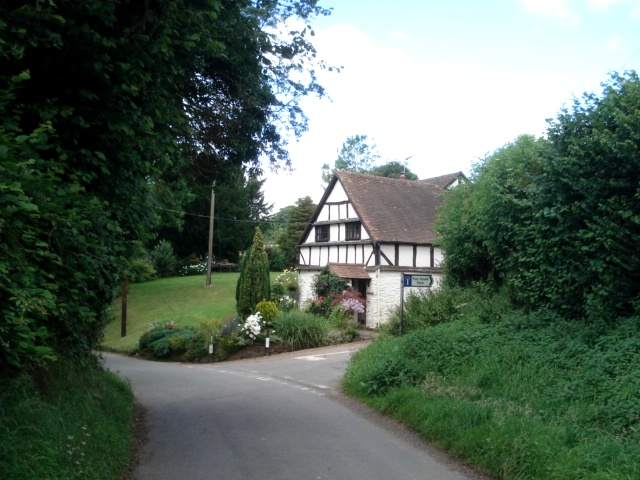

- Location within Herefordshire
- Population: 197 (2011 census)
- Unitary authority: Herefordshire
- Shire county: Herefordshire
- Region: West Midlands
- Country: England
- Sovereign state: United Kingdom
- Post town: Bromyard
- Postcode district: HR7
- Police: West Mercia
- Fire: Hereford and Worcester
- Ambulance: West Midlands
- UK Parliament: North Herefordshire

Thornbury is a village in Herefordshire, England, 5.5 km (3.4 mi) north of the town of Bromyard. The population of the village as taken at the 2011 census was 197. The village has one church. To the north of Thornbury is Thornbury Court. Two tributaries of the River Frome surround the village.

== Hill forts ==
There are two hill forts near the village. Nine hundred metres east of the village is Wall Hills Camp, an oval enclosure about 484 m long by 322 m wide, covering 9 hectares. The bank is up to 12.5 m high with an outer ditch.

Two kilometres north of the village and just over the border in Worcestershire is Garmsley Hill fort, enclosing an area about 330 m long and 150 m wide. The walls are about 10 m wide, up to 5 m high from the interior and about 11 m higher than the land outside. Roman bricks marked with the Roman numeral V have been found there.
