= Upper Sapey =

Village in Herefordshire, England

Coordinates: 52°16′N 2°28′W

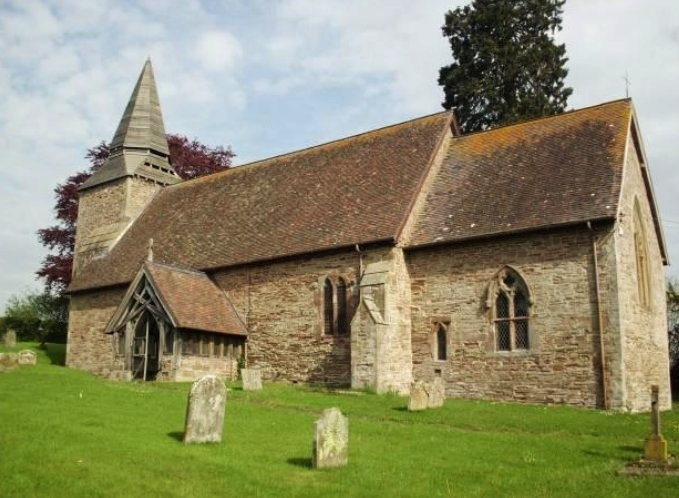
- St Michael and All Angels, Upper Sapey

- Location within Herefordshire
- Population: 460 (2011 Census)
- Unitary authority: Herefordshire
- Shire county: Herefordshire
- Region: West Midlands
- Country: England
- Sovereign state: United Kingdom
- Post town: Worcester
- Postcode district: WR6
- Police: West Mercia
- Fire: Hereford and Worcester
- Ambulance: West Midlands
- UK Parliament: North Herefordshire

Upper Sapey is a small village and civil parish in Herefordshire, England. It is located 4 miles (6 km) northeast of Bromyard. The population of Upper Sapey was 335 as of the 2021 census.
