= Tedstone Delamere =

Village in Herefordshire, England

Coordinates: 52.225°N 2.449°W

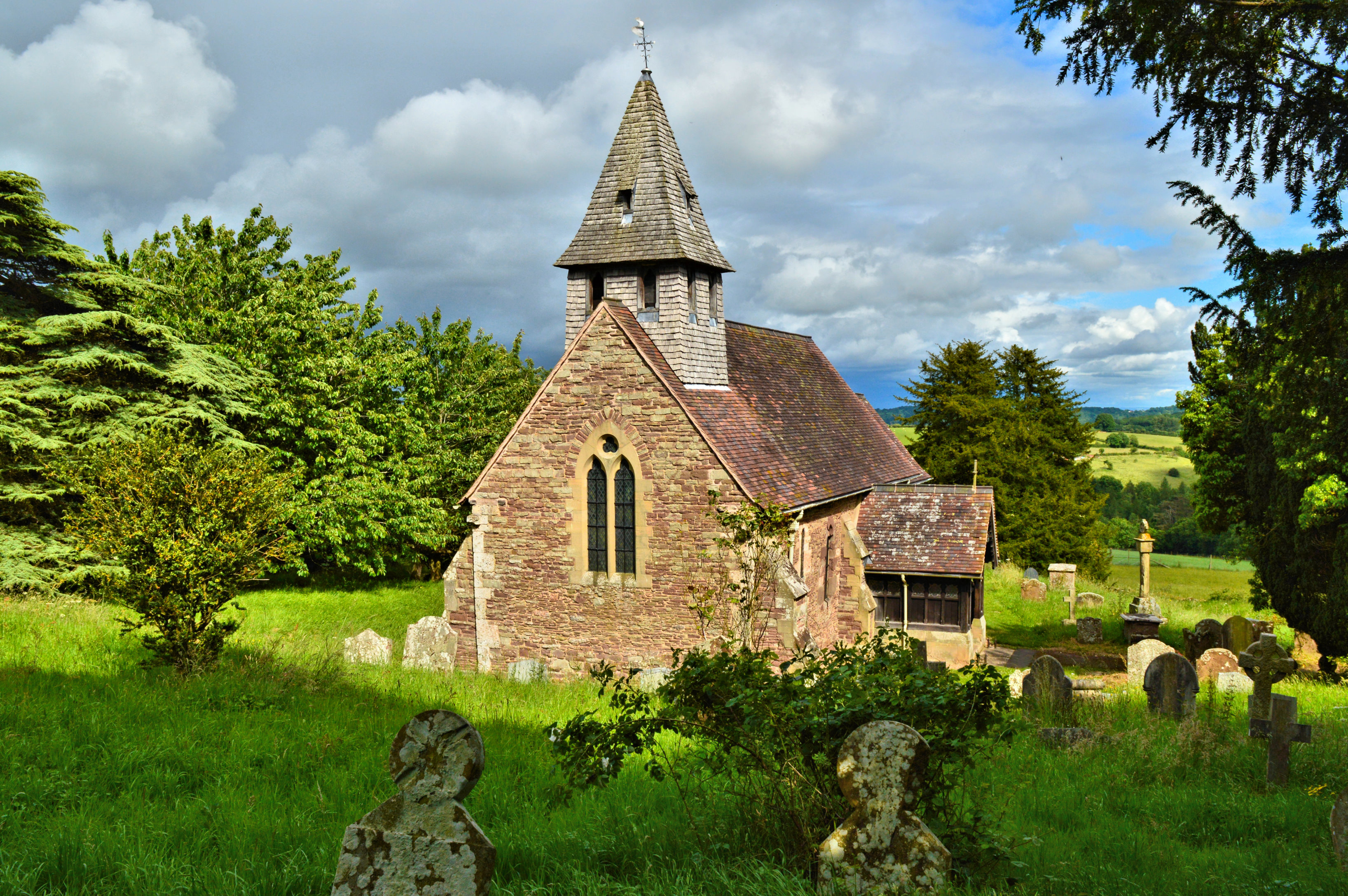
- St James' Church

- Location within Herefordshire
- Population: 138 (2011 Census)
- Unitary authority: Herefordshire
- Shire county: Herefordshire
- Region: West Midlands
- Country: England
- Sovereign state: United Kingdom
- Post town: Bromyard
- Postcode district: HR7
- Police: West Mercia
- Fire: Hereford and Worcester
- Ambulance: West Midlands
- UK Parliament: North Herefordshire

Tedstone Delamere is a village and civil parish in Herefordshire, England, 3.5 miles (6 km) north-east of Bromyard. The population of the parish at the 2011 census was 138.

The etymology of the name derives from the Anglo-Saxon, Teodic after whom the villages near Bromyard were named. "Teodic's stone by the stagnant pool or standing pond". The village was surrounded by downs and meadow land ideal for cattle grazing raising beef herds. The lush grass filtered and watered by the river systems running through it.

The village in common with the shire was long dominated by the patronage of the bishopric, with vast tracts of land in the diocese well into the 20th century. St James' Church chancel was added by Sir George Gilbert Scott in 1856–57.

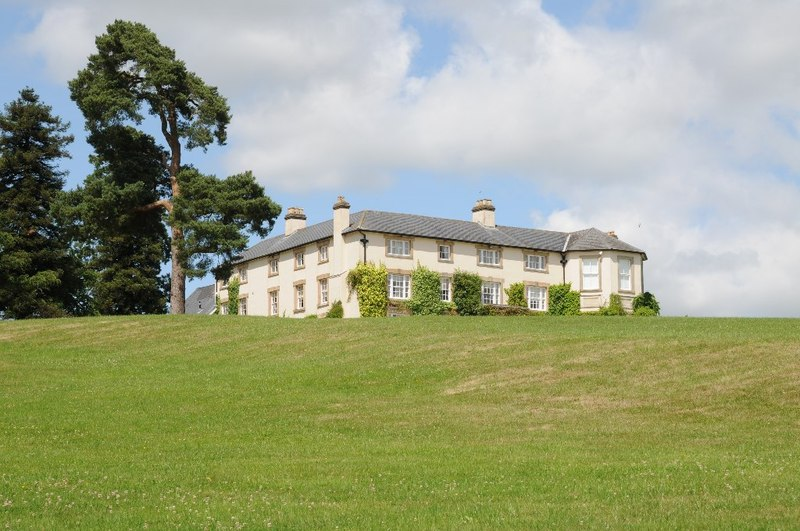
Tedstone Court

At Tedstone Delamere the Sapey Brook runs its course from Upper Sapey, joining the River Teme just beyond Whitbourne. A story is told locally of a mare and a colt that had been stolen and the hoofprints when followed stopped at the bank of the Sapey brook. The owner prayed for their safe return and upon examining the bed of the brook saw hoofprints clearly visible in the rocky bottom. These hoofprints were followed and the thief caught, the horses being safely recovered. The nearby Hoar Stone is said to be the horse thief petrified for his crimes. A later version involves Katherine of Ledbury as the owner of the horses. These petrosomatoglyphs are visible to this day. The horse-thief was named Gray; he reputedly hid for several days in a barn which still stands a short distance from the Brook on the Tedstone Court estate and is referred to as 'Gray's Barn'.
