= Wolferlow =

Village in Herefordshire, England

Coordinates: 52.2526°N 2.4867°W

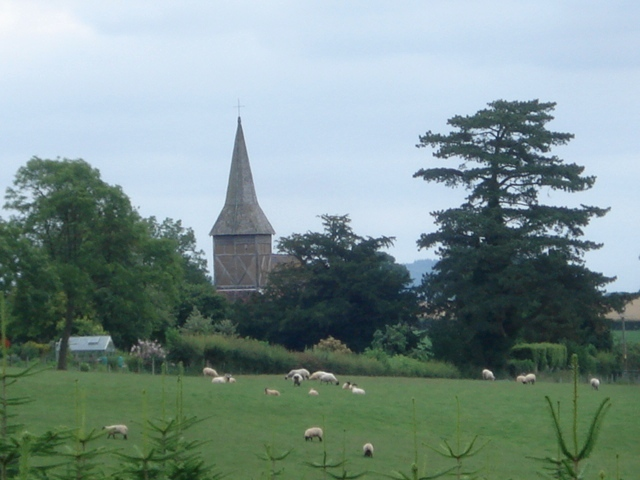

- Location within Herefordshire
- Unitary authority: Herefordshire
- Shire county: Herefordshire
- Region: West Midlands
- Country: England
- Sovereign state: United Kingdom
- Post town: Bromyard
- Postcode district: HR7
- Police: West Mercia
- Fire: Hereford and Worcester
- Ambulance: West Midlands
- UK Parliament: North Herefordshire

Wolferlow is a village and civil parish in northern Herefordshire, England, about 4 miles (6.4 kilometres) north of Bromyard.

In the fourteenth century the manor of Wolfelow belonged to the Earl of March; about 1310 it was granted to Walter de Thornbury, a retainer of the Earl, who became Lord Chancellor of Ireland. Thornbury died in a shipwreck in 1313 while attempting to secure confirmation of his election as Archbishop of Dublin.
