= HR postcode area =

Postcode area within the United Kingdom

Hereford
- Postcode area
- Coordinates: 52.069°N 2.724°W
- Country: United Kingdom
- Postcode area: HR
- Postcode area name: Hereford
- Post towns: 6
- Postcode districts: 9
- Postcode sectors: 33
- Postcodes (live): 6,387
- Postcodes (total): 7,899
- Statistics as at May 2020

The HR postcode area, also known as the Hereford postcode area, is a group of nine postcode districts in England and Wales, within six post towns. These cover most of Herefordshire, including Hereford, Bromyard, Kington, Ledbury, Leominster and Ross-on-Wye. The area also covers very small parts of Gloucestershire and Worcestershire, while the HR2, HR3 and HR5 districts extend across the border to cover a small part of Powys.

== Coverage ==
The approximate coverage of the postcode districts:

Postcode district	Post town	Coverage	Local authority area(s)
HR1	HEREFORD	Hereford (east)	Herefordshire
HR2	HEREFORD	Hereford (south)	Herefordshire, Powys
HR3	HEREFORD	Hay-on-Wye	Herefordshire, Powys
HR4	HEREFORD	Hereford (west)	Herefordshire
HR5	KINGTON	Kington, Lyonshall	Herefordshire, Powys
HR6	LEOMINSTER	Leominster	Herefordshire
HR7	BROMYARD	Bromyard, Edwyn Ralph, Stoke Lacy	Herefordshire
HR8	LEDBURY	Ledbury, Bosbury, Bromsberrow, Hollybush	Herefordshire, Forest of Dean, Malvern Hills
HR9	ROSS-ON-WYE	Ross-on-Wye, Gorsley, Gorsley Common	Herefordshire, Forest of Dean

== Map ==
HR postcode area map, showing postcode districts in red and post towns in grey text, with links to nearby GL, LD, NP, SY and WR postcode areas.

== See also ==
- Postcode Address File
- List of postcode areas in the United Kingdom
