= Little Cowarne =

Village in Herefordshire, England

Coordinates: 52.1568°N 2.58236°W

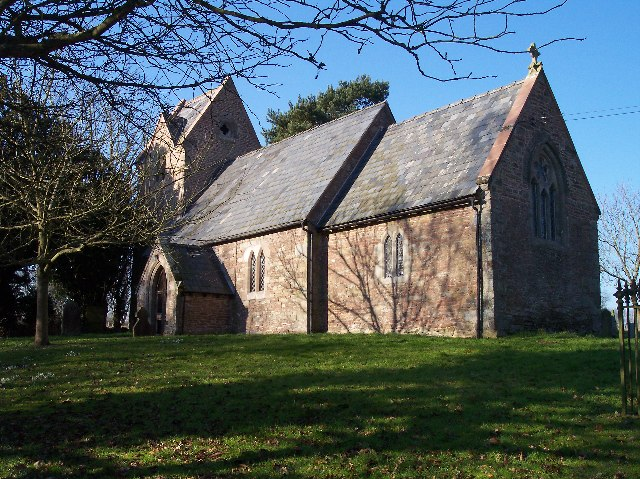
- St Guthlac's Church

- Location within Herefordshire
- OS grid reference: SO6025
  - London: 115 mi (185 km) SE
- Unitary authority: Herefordshire
- Ceremonial county: Herefordshire
- Region: West Midlands
- Country: England
- Sovereign state: United Kingdom
- Post town: BROMYARD
- Postcode district: HR7
- Dialling code: 01885
- Police: West Mercia
- Fire: Hereford and Worcester
- Ambulance: West Midlands
- UK Parliament: North Herefordshire

Little Cowarne is a village and civil parish in the county of Herefordshire, England, and is 9 miles (14 km) north-east from the city and county town of Hereford. The closest town is the market town of Bromyard, 4 miles (6 km) to the north-east.

== History ==
Cowarne is from the Old English 'cū' with 'œrn' meaning a "cow house or dairy farm". In the Domesday Book it is written as 'Cuure', and in c.1255 as 'Gouern'.

At the time of the Norman Conquest the manor was in the Hundred of Plegelgete and county of Herefordshire. Domesday records a 1086 population of 12 households. It contained one freeman, four smallholders (middle level of serf below and with less land than a villager), and seven slaves. Ploughland area was defined by three lord's and one men's plough teams. In 1066 Spirtes (the priest) held the manorial lordship, which in 1086 was transferred to Nigel the doctor who was also tenant-in-chief to king William I.

The Quaker preacher and writer Humphrey Smith (1624-1663), was born at and lived in Little Cowarne as a child and preached between 1654 and his last meeting at Stoke Bliss. He wrote his works while a prisoner before succumbing to gaol fever.

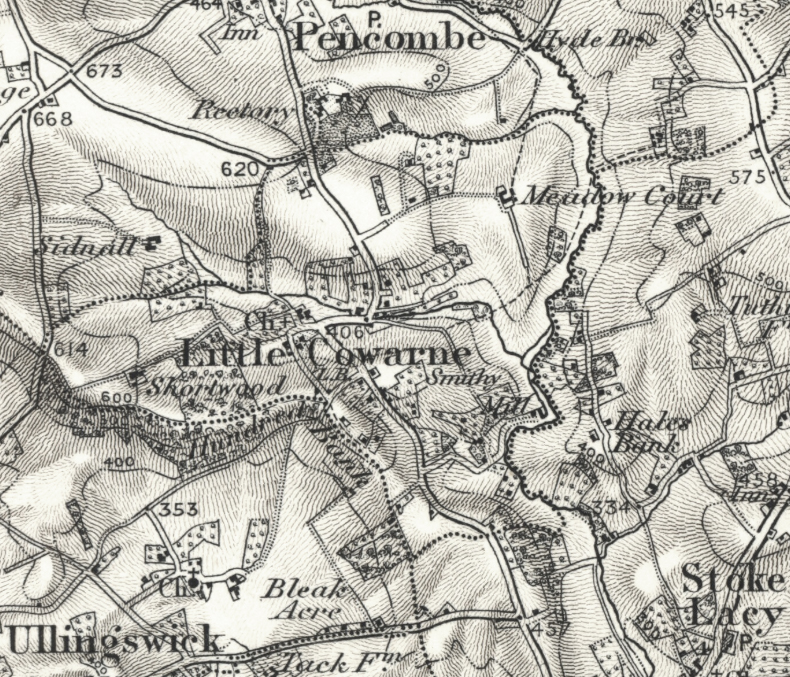
Little Cowarne in 1898

In 1909 the civil parish—in 1857 also township—is described as being at the west of the road from Hereford to Bromyard, and 6 miles (10 km) east from Dinmore station on the Shrewsbury and Hereford section of the Great Western Railway. It was in the Northern division of Herefordshire, the Broxash hundred, and the Union—poor relief and joint parish workhouse provision set up under the Poor Law Amendment Act 1834—petty sessional division and county court district of Bromyard. The ecclesiastical parish was in the rural deanery of Bromyard and the archdeaconry of the Diocese of Hereford. The parish church, which was restored in 1869–70, was described as being in the Norman style, comprising a nave, chancel, a south entrance and a western belfry with one bell. The church register dates to 1563. The living was a vicarage attached to the rectory of Ullingswick, which had a joint value of £225 a year net income, and also included 27 acres (11 ha) of glebe—an area of land used to support a parish priest—in the gift of Charles Gore, the Bishop of Birmingham. In 1857 the parish had been a rectory in the gift of Henry Pepys, the Bishop of Worcester, and a chapelry of Ullingswick.

John Stanhope Arkwright, MP for Hereford, was one of the two major 1909 landowners, whom at the time was living at Lyonshall. Parish soil of 639 acres (259 ha) is described as clayey, with a subsoil of clay and rock, on which were grown wheat, beans, peas, apples, and hops, supporting a population of 134 in 35 houses in 1831, 171 in 1851 and 151 in 1901. The parish mail was accepted and delivered through Worcester via Bromyard. The closest money order and telegraph office was 2.5 miles (4 km) miles away at Burley Gate. School pupils of Little Cowarne were educated at Ullingswick and Pencombe. Commercial trades and occupations in the parish included a blacksmith, a beer retailer who was also a wheelwright, and resident carriers—transporters of trade goods, with sometimes people, between different settlements—who operated between Little Cowarne and Hereford on Wednesdays and Saturdays, and Bromyard on Thursdays. There were seven farmers, one of whom also grew hops, another who was one of the carriers, and another a water miller. The resident assistant Overseer of the poor was also a carrier. Two further carriers were entirely dedicated to the trade. In 1851 there had been seven farmers, a miller, a carpenter, a blacksmith, and a shopkeeper who was also a cider retailer. Children in 1857 were educated at a school supported by voluntary subscription at Ullingswick, 2 miles (3 km) to the south-west, and a school supported by an annual subscription at Felton, 0.5 miles (1 km) farther south-west.

== Geography ==
Little Cowarne parish is, at its widest, about 1.25 miles (2 km) from north to south and 1.4 miles (2 km) east to west, with an area of 2.8 square kilometres (280 ha). Adjacent parishes are Pencombe with Grendon Warren at the north, Much Cowarne at the south-east, Stoke Lacy at the east, and Ullingswick at the west anticlockwise to the south-east. The parish is rural, of farms, arable and pasture fields, managed woodland and coppices, water courses, isolated and dispersed businesses, residential properties, and the nucleated settlement of Little Cowarne village. The only through route in the parish is the minor road which runs north to south between the villages of Pencombe and Stoke Lacy. All other routes are country lanes, farm tracks, access roads and footpaths. A stream which rises at the west of the parish flows west to east, skirting the north of Little Cowarne village, is a tributary to the River Lodon which forms most of the eastern boundary with Stoke Lacy.

== Governance ==
Little Cowarne is represented on the lowest tier of UK governance by two members on the six-member Pencombe Group Parish Council. As Herefordshire is today a unitary authority—no district council between parish and county councils—the parish sends one councillor, representing the Hampton Ward, to Herefordshire County Council. The parish is represented in the UK parliament as part of the North Herefordshire constituency.

In 1974 Little Cowarne became part of the now defunct Malvern Hills District of the county of Hereford and Worcester county, instituted under the Local Government Act 1972. In 2002 the parish, with the parishes of Avenbury, Bromyard and Winslow, Felton, Ocle Pychard, Pencombe with Grendon Warren, Stoke Lacy and Ullingswick, was reassessed as part of Bromyard Ward which elected two councillors to Herefordshire district council.

== Community ==
Parish population in 2001 was 104, and in 2011, 116.

Little Cowarne falls under the Wye Valley NHS Trust; the closest hospital is Bromyard Community Hospital at Leominster, with the closest major hospital Hereford County Hospital at Hereford. Nearest primary education is at Pencombe C.E. Primary School, 1 mile (2 km) to the north, while the parish falls within the catchment area of Queen Elizabeth High School at Bromyard, 3.5 miles (6 km) to the north-east. The Anglican parish church is St Guthlac's, in the Deanery of Bromyard and the Diocese of Hereford. The church is supported by Herefordshire Historic Churches Trust. Little Cowarne's public house is The Three Horseshoes Inn. Holiday cottage rentals are provided at two farm establishments.

The parish is served by two stops on the Hereford to Bromyard section of the Hereford to Ledbury bus route. The closest rail connection is at Leominster railway station on the Crewe to Newport Welsh Marches Line, 8 miles (13 km) to the north-west.

== Landmarks ==
Within Little Cowarne are nine Grade II listed buildings, including St Guthlac's Church, houses, cottages, and hop kilns.

St Guthlac's Church dates to the 12th and 13th century, and was "heavily restored" by the Herefordshire architect F. R. Kempson in 1870, and consists of a chancel, nave, west tower, and a gabled south-west porch. Constructed of dressed rubble masonry, it is tile roofed, and contains in the chancel a 19th-century traceried east window, a 12th-century window in the north wall, a piscina with aumbry, and 19th-century encaustic floor tiles. The church's stained glass is 19th-century, with that in the west window of grisaille decoration.
