= Felton, Herefordshire =

Village in Herefordshire, England

Coordinates: 52.1324°N 2.61561°W

Felton
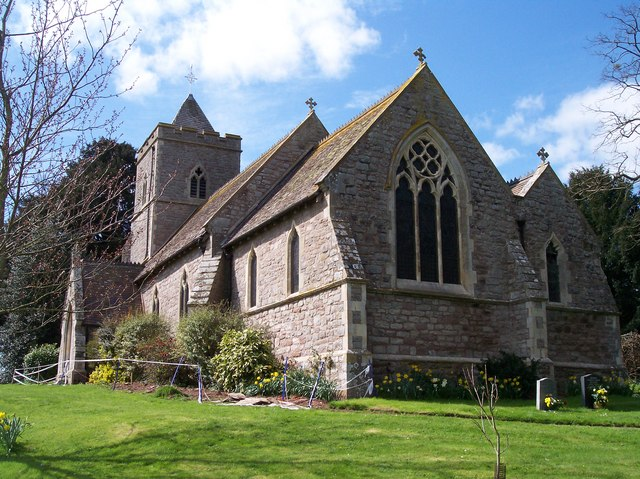
- Church of St Michael the Archangel

- Location within Herefordshire
- OS grid reference: SO579484
  - London: 115 mi (185 km) SE
- Unitary authority: Herefordshire
- Ceremonial county: Herefordshire
- Region: West Midlands
- Country: England
- Sovereign state: United Kingdom
- Post town: HEREFORD
- Postcode district: HR1
- Police: West Mercia
- Fire: Hereford and Worcester
- Ambulance: West Midlands
- UK Parliament: North Herefordshire

Felton is a small village and civil parish in the county of Herefordshire, England, and is 7 miles (11 km) north-east from the city and county town of Hereford. The closest town is the market town of Bromyard, 6 miles (10 km) to the north-east.

== History ==
Felton is derived from the Old English 'fenn' with 'tūn' meaning a "farmstead or village in a fen or marshland", or a 'feld- tūn' meaning a "tūn in a feld". In the Domesday Book the 1086 manor is written as 'Feltone', and in 1242 as 'Feltun'.

At the time of the Norman Conquest the manor was in the Hundred of Tornelaus and county of Herefordshire. Domesday records a 1086 population of 7 households. It contained one smallholder (middle level of serf below and with less land than a villager), five slaves, and one Frenchman. Ploughland area was defined by three lord's and one men's plough teams. In 1066 the canons of St Guthlac at Hereford held the manorial lordship, who in 1086 remained lords and were also tenants-in-chief to king William I.

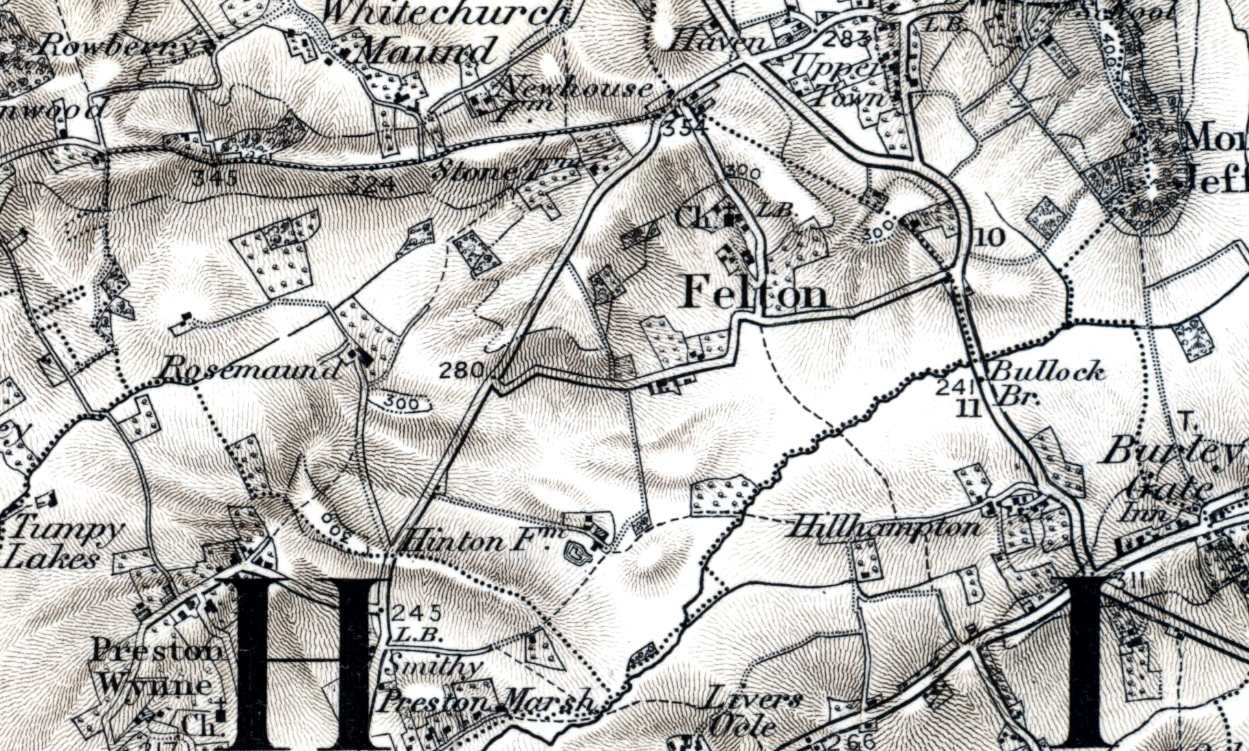
Felton in 1898

In 1909 the civil parish is described as half a mile south of the road from Leominster to Ledbury, and about 5 miles (8 km) east from Withington station on the Hereford, Ledbury and Worcester section of the Great Western Railway. It was in the Northern division of Herefordshire, the Broxash hundred, and the Union—poor relief and joint parish workhouse provision set up under the Poor Law Amendment Act 1834—petty sessional division and county court district of Bromyard.

The ecclesiastical parish in 1909 served 97 people, was in the rural deanery of Weston (in 1858 the Frome deanery), and the archdeaconry of the Diocese of Hereford. The parish church of St Michael, which was rebuilt in 1854 to the design of architect Thomas Nicholson of Hereford, was described as being an "edifice of local stone with Bath stone dressings" in Decorated style. St Michael's comprised a nave, chancel, vestry, a south porch, a western embattled tower with five bells, four "newly cast" by 1858. The interior contained an organ chamber, a carved alabaster pulpit, and a reredos of Caen stone. In 1891 the church was "thoroughly" restored, costing £800, which included interior renovation and the addition of two further stained glass windows, the addition of a short spire to the tower, and much exterior masonry renewed. In 1858 a sedilia and encaustic nave and chancel floor tiles were recorded. The church in 1909 could seat 90 people, and contained a church register dating to 1637. The living was a rectory with a value of £144 a year net income, and also included 47.5 acres (19 ha) of glebe—an area of land used to support a parish priest—and a residence, in the gift of Messrs. Wood, who were also lords of the manor.

John Stanhope Arkwright, great-great grandson of industrialist Sir Richard Arkwright, and MP for Hereford, was one of the two major 1909 landowners, whom at the time was living at Lyonshall. Parish soil is described as clayey, with a subsoil of clay, on which were grown wheat, beans, turnips, apples, and hops in 1858 on 1,149 acres (465 ha), and in 1909 on 1,800 acres (728 ha). Population in 1831 was 135 people in 22 houses; in 1851 was 112 people, and in 1901 was 69. Local Government Board Orders of March 1884 transferred the settlement area of Lower Hopes to Felton from Ullingswick, while part of Felton was transferred to Bodenham. The parish mail was accepted and delivered through Bromyard in 1858, and through Worcester via Pencombe in 1909. The closest money order and telegraph office was less than 1 mile (2 km) south-east at Burley Gate on the present A465 road. School pupils of Felton were educated at Preston Wynne in 1909. In 1858 children were educated at a school supported by private subscription, providing for the Felton, Ullingswick and Little Cowarne parishes. There was also a Sunday school at Felton. Listed commercial trades and occupations in the 1909 parish were five farmers, including one who ran a farming company which also grew hops, and another two who also grew hops. Farmers in 1851 numbered six.

== Geography ==
Felton parish is, at its widest, about 1.5 miles (2 km) from north to south and 2 miles (3 km) east to west, with an area of 4.67 square kilometres (467 ha). Adjacent parishes are Bodenham at the north, Ullingswick at the north-east, Ocle Pychard at the south-east, and Preston Wynne with a small part of Marden at the south-west.

The parish is rural, of farms, arable and pasture fields, managed woodland and coppices, water courses, isolated and dispersed businesses, residential properties, and the small nucleated settlement of Felton. The only through route, and through the centre of the parish, is the minor road which runs north-east to south-west between the A417 and A465 roads, both outside the parish. The A417 forms a small part of the boundary with Ullingswick at the extreme east. All other routes are country lanes, farm tracks, access roads and footpaths. A stream which rises towards the west of the parish, flows north-east to south-west. A further stream at the south, which forms the boundary with Ocle Pychard, joins the first stream outside the parish and becomes a tributary for the River Lugg, 2.5 miles (4 km) to the west.

== Governance ==
Felton is represented on the lowest tier of UK governance by two members on the nine-member Ocle Pychard Group Parish Council, which also represents the parishes of Ocle Pychard and Ullingswick. As Herefordshire is today a unitary authority—no district council between parish and county councils—the parish sends one councillor, representing the Three Crosses Ward, to Herefordshire County Council. The parish is represented in the UK Parliament as part of the North Herefordshire constituency.

In 1974 Felton became part of the now defunct Malvern Hills District of the county of Hereford and Worcester county, instituted under the Local Government Act 1972. In 2002 the parish, with the parishes of Avenbury, Bromyard and Winslow, Little Cowarne, Ocle Pychard, Pencombe with Grendon Warren, Stoke Lacy and Ullingswick, was reassessed as part of Bromyard Ward which elected two councillors to Herefordshire district council.

== Community ==
Felton falls under the Wye Valley NHS Trust; the closest hospital is Bromyard Community Hospital at Leominster, with the closest major hospital Hereford County Hospital at Hereford. Nearest primary education is Burley Gate C.E. Primary School, 1 mile (2 km) to the south-east, while the parish falls within the catchment area of Queen Elizabeth High School at Bromyard, 3.5 miles (6 km) to the north-east.

The Anglican parish church is St Michael the Archangel's, in the ecclesiastical parish of Felton and Preston Wynne, in the Deanery of Hereford and the Diocese of Hereford. The church is supported by Herefordshire Historic Churches Trust.

The parish is served by a bus stop outside the parish on the A465 road at Burley Gate on the Hereford to Bromyard sections of the Hereford to Ledbury and Hereford to Worcester bus routes. The closest rail connections are at Hereford railway station, 6 miles (10 km) to the south-west, on the Crewe to Newport Welsh Marches Line, the Oxford to Hereford Cotswold Line, and by West Midlands Trains to Birmingham.

== Notable people ==
- The Rev. Evelyn Hill, who played in the 1880 FA Cup final, was born in the village in 1859; he was the son of the village rector.

== Landmarks ==
Within Felton are four Grade II listed buildings, being St Michael's Church, two houses, and a hop kiln.

St Michael's Church dates to the 1853 to 1854 rebuilding to the designs of Hereford architect Thomas Nicholson (1823–95), one of his earliest works, with an 1891 added porch and recessed pyramid stump spire to the tower by Nicholson & Son. Constructed of "local grey sandstone" with a slate roof it comprises a nave with a stepped down and narrower chancel, a west tower, a north vestry, and a south porch. The church is of Decorated style, the tower of three stages with diagonal buttresses and a turret at the north-east. The upper bell stage has two-light louvered abat-son. Above the south entrance is a niche with a figure of St Michael. There are three windows in the chancel, the east being of three lights with geometrical tracery and stained glass imagery depicting Christ. The ceiling of the plastered-wall chancel is painted blue over the sanctuary at the east, with rafters having painted stars; at the north the vestry is entered through a "wide" arch. At the south of the chancel is a piscina and a window seat, and at the north, a "large" aumbry, with the floor laid with encaustic tiles. Fixtures and fittings included a Perpendicular font, and an 1882-dated pulpit with "symbols of the Evangelists". The stone reredos contains a statue niche and quatrefoil details.
