= Valiant Sixty =

17th century Quaker group

The Valiant Sixty were a group of early activists and itinerant preachers in the Religious Society of Friends (Quakers). Mainly from northern England, they spread the ideas of the Friends in the second half of the 17th century. They were also called the First Publishers of Truth. In fact they numbered more than 60.

== Notable members ==
- Edward Burrough, early preacher and Quaker apologist who held a pamphlet debate with John Bunyan
- Margaret Fell, one of the earliest sponsors of George Fox and the Friends movement. She opened her home, Swarthmoor Hall, to Quaker meetings and later married George Fox
- Mary Fisher, a preacher and missionary who travelled to the New World and to Turkey to spread Friends beliefs
- George Fox, often considered the founder of the Friends movement
- Francis Howgill, a prominent Nonconformist
- James Nayler, radical member of the Society of Friends
- George Whitehead, Quaker teenage preacher who travelled across England
- John Camm, one of the earliest Quaker preachers and writers, who travelled to London with Francis Howgill to warn Oliver Cromwell against religious oppression and the use of law in matters of conscience.

== Distinctives ==
These missionaries of Quakerism were unusual in their time. Most other preaching was done by well-educated ordained male clergymen, but most of the Valiant Sixty were ordinary farmers and tradesmen, and several of them were women. Because the Valiant Sixty came from the northern part of England they were considered backward. Because they stood against the church structure in place in England at that time, many of them suffered imprisonment or corporal punishment or both. Once Quaker practices were outlawed, they were in technical violation of the law. They can therefore be seen as early practitioners of civil disobedience.

Members of the Valiant Sixty travelled not only throughout England, but to the rest of Great Britain, Europe, and North America. In particular, Mary Fisher travelled to Turkey and spoke with the Sultan about her beliefs.

== List of members ==
- William Ames
- Thomas Aldham
- Christopher Atkinson
- Anne Audland
- John Audland
- Thomas Ayrey
- John Banks
- Miles Bateman
- Dorothy Bensen
- Gervase Benson
- George Bewley
- Miles Birkett
- Ann Blaykling
- John Blaykling
- John Braithwaite
- Thomas Briggs
- John Burnyeat
- Edward Burrough
- John Camm
- Mabel Camm
- William Caton
- Richard Clayton
- William Dewsbury

- Richard Farnsworth
- Leonard Fell
- Margaret Fell
- Mary Fisher
- Elizabeth Fletcher
- George Fox
- Thomas Goodaire
- Miles Halhead
- George Harrison
- Roger Hebden
- Thomas Holme
- Elizabeth Hooton or Hooten
- Francis Howgill
- Mary Howgill
- Miles Hubbersty
- Stephen Hubbersty
- Richard Hubberthorne
- Thomas Kilham
- James Lancaster
- John Lawson
- Thomas Lawson
- James Nayler

- Alexander Parker
- James Parnell
- Thomas Rawlinson
- Ambrose Rigge
- Thomas Robertson
- Richard Robinson
- Thomas Salthouse
- John Scaife
- William Simpson
- John Slee
- Thomas Stacey
- John Story
- John Stubbs
- Thomas Stubbs
- Christopher Taylor
- Thomas Taylor
- Dorothy Waugh
- Jane Waugh
- George Whitehead
- John Whitehead
- Robert Widders or Withers
- John Wilkinson

== See also ==
- Quaker history
- Quakers in North America
