= Mary Howgill =

Personal details
- Born: c. 1618
- Died: after 1669
- Denomination: Society of Friends

Mary Howgill (c. 1618 – after 1669) was a prominent early member of the Religious Society of Friends (Quakers) in England. She is regarded as one of the Valiant Sixty, the principal early preachers of Quakerism. She is best known for her preaching and for her writings, especially her 1656 Letter to Oliver Cromwell, called Protector, a lengthy public defence of the Quakers personally delivered to Cromwell.

== Life ==
=== Early life and Quaker ministry ===
Mary Howgill’s early life and family background are uncertain and no birth record exists. She was probably the sister of Francis Howgill, another early Quaker preacher from Grayrigg in Westmorland. It is also possible she was one of two women called Mary Howgill in Lancashire with surviving parish baptism records. The Dictionary of National Biography suggests she was likely born sometime around 1618.

Coincidence suggest that Howgill was a convert of the first great wave of Quaker enthusiasm in 1652, when George Fox began preaching in Lancashire and Westmorland. Within a year, in 1653, she was in prison in Kendal for preaching Quaker ideas. This suggests that her ministry may have followed swiftly after her conversion.

She travelled extensively across the British Isles in the course of her ministry, preaching in Lancashire, East Anglia, Devonshire, London, and in Ireland. While delivering her letter she apparently had a long conversation with Protector Oliver. As with almost all the early preaching Friends, she suffered spells of imprisonment, both in Lancashire and in Devonshire.

==== Controversy with other Friends ====
In 1658, while she was travelling in the ministry in the east of England, Richard Hubberthorne, another early Quaker pioneer, suggested to George Fox that Howgill’s preaching was becoming unhinged, and that Friends were beginning to refuse to have her visit their meetings. In 1660 a Friend wrote:

"She much opposes us, yet for the world's sake she is borne, it were well she were stopped."

Another contemporary described her as "distracted". Part of the background to these objections was a fear of public scandal and anti Quaker persecution in the aftermath of the Naylor case of 1656. Howgill was apocalyptic in her theology and may have shared some of James Naylor's radical tendencies. It is also likely that the near universal consensus against women preaching meant Howgill’s very public ministry courted persecution.

== Writings ==
=== Letter to Cromwell ===
She delivered her 1653 Letter to Oliver Cromwell, called Protector in person and subsequently had a lengthy discourse with him. She began the letter:

When thou wast a soldier for the Lord, thou wast low, and little in thine own eyes; then thou remembredst the Lord, and stood in his fear, and he was thy strength; but now thou art in thy own strength, and hast forgot that time: I say, thou hast denied the Lord God, and thy own law with the pride of thy own heart; and the pride of the heart is now acting all manner of cruelty against them who are in the fear of the Lord

— Mary Howgill,

The letter was written during a time of religious persecution, and challenges political and religious authorities that punished statements of religious conscience with confiscation of property, physical violence, and imprisonment.

=== The Vision of the Lord of Hosts ===
In 1660, following The Restoration of the monarchy under Charles II, she wrote a pamphlet describing a dream in which God had told her of the terrible persecutions about to happen to Quakers and other religious and political radicals in England:

I will allow this violence to come, and the chains of the wild-beasts to be broken, that they may bow down a stiff-necked and a gain-saying [opposing] people, against me, and against my name. I will harden Pharaoh's heart, that I may show my power upon every man and woman; and I will suffer the violent to go on in their violence, for the trying of the faith of my own people, unto whom I have made known my Kingdom, and entrusted them with my secrets, upon whom in the Light of my countenance will I shine, and they shall see the glory of my throne, and they shall magnify my name. And after the night of Apostasy, and after the dragon's rage, my people shall bear a further testimony of my great and glorious name, and they shall leave a more clear and heavenly declaration upon record, than my servants heretofore have done, and it shall stand to ages, and in generations to come, that they may see how God manifested himself unto his people in a day of great suffering.

— Mary Howgill

The persecution of Quakers and other Nonconformists did indeed significantly worsen in 1662 following the Act of Uniformity.

== See also ==
- Valiant Sixty
- English Dissenters
- Levellers
