= Hannah Stranger =

Quaker missionary

- Born: unknown 1600s
- Died: after 1679 in America?
- Other name: Hannah Salter
- Occupation: Quaker missionary
- Known for: supporter of James Nayler during an act of blasphemy
- Spouses: John Stanger; Thomas Salter
- Children: two

Hannah Stranger (1600s – after 1679) was an English Quaker missionary and a supporter of James Nayler who was found guilty of blasphemy when he was tried by the English parliament.

== Life ==
All the details of her early life are unknown. She comes to notice in 1656 when she and Martha Simmonds began singing to interrupt Francis Howgill and Edward Hubberthorne at a Quaker meeting. Martha had published her ideas about Quakerism including "O England, Thy Time is Come". This included some text by Stranger.

In October she went with a group that included her husband John to request the release of James Nayler from the jail in Exeter. They had an authorisation obtained by Martha. Nayler was released and they then set out for Bristol via the towns of Wells and Glastonbury. The three of them were accompanied by six others including Martha and Thomas Simmonds and Dorcas Erbery.

They entered Bristol on 24 October with Nayler on a horse with to his left and right Hannah and Martha Simmonds. They were all imprisoned and the local magistrates interrogated them before Nayler was dispatched to London to face trial for blasphemy. The evidence included letters that Hannah had written to Nayler where she called him "only begotten son of God" and "Prince of Peace". On one of the letters was a postscript by her husband where he suggested that Nayler should not be "James" but "Jesus".

Their "confessions" were gathered and they also included those of Timothy Wedlock according to a contemporary account that also included the Quakers "damnable opinions". Nayler was tried in December but parliament had an interest, and they got involved in Nayler's trial.

On December 27, Nayler's vicious punishment was made. This included having his tongue pierced with a hot spike and a B branded on his forehead. Hannah, Martha Simmonds and Dorcas Erbury were at the base of his pillory mirroring the three Mary's who were at Jesus's crucifixion.

She later recanted her actions in writing on 2 November 1669 when she joined a Quaker meeting in Bristol. By this time she had remarried to Thomas Salter and she had two children. In 1671 she went to lobby the King for the release of Margaret Fell at the request of Fox.

The details of her death are unknown. She was recorded to be in America in 1679 at Tokaney, Delaware.
