= William Dewsbury =

English Quaker and writer, c. 1621–1688

William Dewsbury (c. 1621–1688) was an English Quaker minister and religious writer in the early period of the movement. He was born in Allerthorpe, Yorkshire, around 1621. Little is known of his parents or education, except that his father died when he was eight years old.

== Early life ==
Dewsbury studied both scripture and other religious texts from an early age. Until around the age of 13 he worked as a shepherd in Allerthorpe, after which he became an apprentice to a weaver in Holbeck. In 1642, his brief experience in the Parliamentary Army led him to reject fighting with "carnall" weapons on religious grounds. Dewsbury travelled to Edinburgh, having become interested in Presbyterianism, but was disappointed by the formality of the Scottish faith. It is unknown when Dewsbury married, but a date of around 1649 has been proposed. It is known that his wife, whose first name was Ann, came from York, and that they were married in an Anabaptist ceremony. The couple unsuccessfully attempted to regain in court some former property of Ann Dewsbury, which had been taken by her brother.

== Conversion and preaching ==
In 1651 Dewsbury met the prominent English Dissenter and early Quaker George Fox in the house of a Lieutenant Roper, near Balsby. Also present were Thomas Goodaire, James Nayler and Richard Farnsworth. In 1652 he became a Quaker minister, and travelled through Westmorland, Cumberland and Lancashire preaching. During this journey, both Dewsbury and Robert Widders, an associate, were attacked by a group of Baptists while speaking in Carlisle, and Widders was later imprisoned. He spoke in Sedbergh in 1653, and was imprisoned in York after being accused of blasphemy by a local priest in 1654. However, he was set free by proclamation soon afterwards when the authorities realised that the evidence against him was spurious.

Dewsbury died in Warwick on 17 June 1688.

== Publications ==
- The breathings of life to God's spiritual Israel, through a faithfull follower of the Lamb, in the regeneration and kingdome of patience and tribulation; and now a sufferer in bonds for the testimony of the Lord Iesus, known to the world by the name of William Deusbury – London: [s. n.], printed in the year 1663 [i. e. 1664]
- Christ exalted, and alone worthy to open the seals of the book. And the scriptures owned in their place. A true testimony of him, as is manifest, in answer to a book, intituled, The Quakers apostacy, from the perfect rule of scriptures. Given forth by John Timson, of Great Bowden in Leicestershire. And the deceits and blasphemies he charges upon the Quakers, is turned upon his own head, and he found guilty of what he reproaches them with, in what is written for the simples sake, and truth to clear from false accusations and lyes cast upon it. And the ten queries he saith he vindicateth, and would print but foure of them, they are all published, with the answers that he charges to be confused, dark and deceitfull, that the answers may witnesse for themselves against what is charged upon them. He that hath an understanding in the light, read and judge. William Dewsberry – London: Calvert, Giles, 1656
- The discovery of mans return to his first estate by the operation of the power of God in the great work of regeneration. With a word to all saints, who set their faces towards Sion to seek the Lord their God. And to those that are waiting in Sion, to worship him in spirit and truth. A word to the back-slider, who hath tasted of the good word of God, and the powers of the world to come, and hath turned the grace of God into wantonness, and gone back into spiritual Sodom and Egypt, where our Lord is crucified. With a discovery of Mystery-Babylon and her merchants: with a word to the hard-hearted unbelieving Jews, who profess Christ in words, and deny to be guided by his counsel, the light in their conscience, and stumble at him to their own destruction. From the spirit of the Lord, written by one whom the people of this world calls a Quaker, whose name in the flesh is William Deusbury; but hath a new name, the world knows not, written in the book of life – London : Calvert, Giles, 1655
- The discovery of the great enmity of the serpent against the seed of the woman, which witnesseth against him where he rules, both in rulers priests and people: whose hearts are now made manifest in this great day of the Lords power; wherein he is sending his sons and daughters in the power of his spirit to run to and fro to declare his word. Which discovereth the state of England, who according to her own lusts hath heaped up teachers to her selfe that hath spoken smooth things to her, calling her the beautiful church and spouse of Christ; but in the day of tryall she is found in enmity to Christ ... A true testimony of him the world knows by name, William Deusbery, and in scorn calls Quaker; who hath been by them imprisoned in York, Darby, Leicester, and Northampton, where he is now kept in the common goal ... Also his call to the ministry of the everlasting Gospel by the still voyce of the Spirit of God ... The word of the Lord to all in England whom the Lord hath betrusted with power ... With a lamentation over all in England; who oppose Christ in his spiritual appearance, and to slight the day of your visitation to your own destruction. From the common goal in Northampton the 25 day of the 4 month. 1655 – London : Calvert, Giles, 1655
- A discovery of the ground from whence the persecution did arise, and the proceedings of those that were actors in it, in Northamptionshire, against the servant of the most high God William Deusbery, whom they have cast into prison for the Word of God, and for the testimony of Jesus Christ, and Ioseph Stor, who was allowed of the Lord to come to visit him, and for the truths sake, that not any lie might rest upon it, to cause the simple to stumble at the ways of truth: here is declared the truth of the matter, as followcth [sic] – London, printed in the year 1655
- An exhortation to all people to prize their time, in making their calling & election sure, before they go hence and be no more. As it hath pleased the Lord God in his tender mercy, in his heavenly power in Christ, to assist his tender hand-maid Mary Sam, and gave her full assurance of her eternal salvation, who lived with her grandfather William Dewsbury at Warwick, where he was and is prisoner for the testimony of our Lord Jesus Christ. And there she departed this natural life when she was the age of twelve years and sixteen weeks; and in her sickness declared to all about her what God had done for her soul. A brief account whereof follows – London : Andrew Sowle, [1680]
- The faithful testimony of that antient servant of the Lord, and minister of the everlasting gospel William Dewsbery; his books, epistles and writings, collected and printed for future service – London : Andrew Sowle, [1689]
- A general epistle to be read in the fear of God, in and amongst the assemblies of his people by William Dewsbury – London, Benjamin Clark
- A general epistle, given forth from the spirit of the Lord, to be read in his fear in the assemblies of the Church of the first-born, gathered in these northern-countries, and in all countries and islands where ever the people of the Lord are scattered over the face of the earth. W. D. – London, printed in the year 1668
- The mighty day of the Lord, is coming. In which, Christ is exalting King upon the holy hill of Sion, over all the world to reign, who in this day of the Lord knocks at the door of the heart of Jew and Gentile, kindreds, tongues, people and nations, who desires to know the onely true God, and Christ Jesus whom he hath sent to be the light of the world, and salvation to the ends of the earth, to all that obey him; but a stone of stumbling and a rock of offence to all that reject his counsel, whom he will take in their own craft, and overturn in their own devices to the shame and confusion of their faces; but they that believe in him, shall never be ashamed. The word of the Lord to all the faithful scattered in the world, that in the counsel of the Lord stands to strengthen the desires raised towards his name, them to give victory over the world. A warning to all that dwell upon the earth, and to the kings, princes, and rulers in the world, to submit to Christ the light of the world, lest they perish in the day of his fierce wrath, when the hearts of all that disobey him, do fall before him. From the common goal in Northampton, the 7 day of the 11 month, 1655. Given forth by him the world knows by name, William Dewsbery, at the writing of this, prisoner for the word of God, and testimony of Jesus Christ – London : Calvert, Giles, 1656
- The principles of truth: being a declaration of our faith, who are call'd Quakers. whereby all that wants peace with God, may return into their first estate, through the operation of the Light and power of God in the great work of regeneration. Written by E.B. J.C. W.D. H.S. I.P. and A.P. – [London: s. n., 1665]
- Several letters written to the saints of the Most High, to build them up in the truth, as it is in Jesus. By William Deusbery. James Naylor. George Fox. John Whitehead – London : [s. n.], printed in the year 1654
- This for dear friends in London, and them that are aboard the ship in order to transportation; or elsewhere all abroad – [London: s. n., 1665]
- To all nations, kindreds, languages, tongues, and people, with your princes and rulers, and all people from the highest to the lowest. This to you is the word of the Lord God – London: Wilson, Robert, 1660
- To all the faithful and suffering members, in all holes, prisons and gaoles, for the word of God, and testimony of Jesus Christ, with the rest of the faithfull, wherever scattered upon the face of the earth – [London: s. n., 1664]
- To all the faithful brethren born of the immortal seed, of the father of life, and sent forth in the great commission, and power of the king of eternal glory, to gather his elect from the winds of the earth, forth of all nations and kindreds where they are scattered; this to you is the word of God – [London: printed for Thomas Simmons, 1661]
- To all the faithfull and suffering members in all holes, prisons and goals [sic], for the Word of God and testimony of Jesus Christ; with the rest of the faithful where-ever scatter'd upon the face of the earth – London: printed and sold by Andrew Sowle
- To all the faithfull in Christ, who have stood in his council the light, to be led in the foot-steps of the flock of the companions, and to all that professe the light of Christ to be their guide.... [London], printed in the year 1664
- To all the faithfull in Christ, who have stood in his council the light, to be led in the foot-steps of the flock of the companions, and to all that professe the light of Christ to be their guide: to you I write these following lines, to be seriously weighed, in the weight and ponderous spirit, wherein you may discern a discovery of a false birth, in some, that came forth with us, as to own the light, in their judgements, and goe forth from us, in rejecting the stroake of the pure judgements of God, through the working of the mystery of iniquity, and so become as the umtimely birth, that doth not see the sun in his glory, nor the beauty of Sion (who hath passed through death unto life) in her comely unity in the spirit and bond of peace: he that can receive it, let him, now in the coole of the day. when council may be hearkened unto, and rightly understood in the truth, as it is in Jesus. [London ], Printed in the year, 1663
- A true prophecie of the mighty day of the Lord. Which is coming, and is appeared in the north of England, and is arising toward the south; and shall overspread this nation, and all the nations of the world. Wherein the Lord is redeeming Sion forth of her long inthral'd captivity in Babylons kingdom, where she hath been scattered in the cloudy and dark day, into forms and observations, and there kept by the priests, and teachers of the world, who ran when God never sent them. Now is the Lord appearing in this day of his might power, to gather his elect together, out of all forms observations, kindreds, tongues, and nations; ... A word from the Lord to all the inhabitants of England, rulers, priests and people, to hast to meet the Lord with speedy repentance, and returning within, to harken diligently to his counsel, ... From the spirit of the Lord, writte by one whose name in the flesh is William Dewsbury, called Quaker with the people of the world, who live in their perishing nature – London: Calvert, Giles, 1655
- The word of the Lord to all children born again of the immortal seed as the salutation of the bowels of the unlimitted love of the father, flowing forth to you in the forcible power of his own life, thorow your brother and companion in tribulation, and kingdom of patienc in the Lord Jesus Christ. William Dewsbury [London: s. n.], printed in the year 1665
- The word of the Lord to all the inhabitants in England, from the highest to the lowest, that they may know his determination, and so be entreated to break off from their sin, in true obedience unto him, that they may escape in the day of his dreadful appearance when no flesh shall stand before him. William Dewsbery – [London: s. n.], printed in the year 1666
- The word of the Lord to his church and holy assembly regenerated and born again of the righteous seed, which the Lord hath blessed. To whom this is sent to be carefully and distinctly read, in the fear of the Lord, when they are met together, in the light of the covenant of the most high God – [London: s. n.], printed in the year 1666
- The word of the Lord to Sion the New Jerusalem, the bride the Lambs wife, the excellency of all the glory that is amongst the people; though she be now in deep sufferings, in fulness of time God will clear the innocency of her children; and all the nations of the earth shall call her the blessed of the Lord, yea, the holy city, in whom the Lord dwells, to manifest his glory upon the earth amongst the children of men for ever – London: [s. n.], printed in the year, 1664
- The word of the Lord, to his beloved citty New-Ierusalem, come from God, cloathed with the excellency of the glory of his love; and is the bride the Lambs wife, with the flowings of the tender compassionate bowels of the Lord Jesus, to all the mourners in Sion, and the afflicted, desolate people, who waite for his coming as for the morning, and hath not satisfaction in any thing but in the enjoyment of his sweet and comfortable presence – [London: s. n., 1663]

The source of the list is the Catalogue of the Library of the Religious Society of Friends, London, cited below.

== Sources ==
- Smith, Edward, The life of William Dewsbury, an early and eminent minister of the Gospel in the Society of Friends : interspersed with many particulars relating to the peculiar views of that society, and the sufferings of its members for the testimony of a good conscience, London, Darton & Harvey, 1836
- Facsimile reprint of Edward Smith's William Dewsbury, with a foreword by Winifred White, Cover title: William Dewsbury c1621-1688: one of the first Valiant Sixty Quakers, York, William Sessions, 1997 ISBN 1-85072-203-X
- Claus Bernet (2010). "William Dewsbury". In Bautz, Traugott (ed.). Biographisch-Bibliographisches Kirchenlexikon (BBKL) (in German). Vol. 31. Nordhausen: Bautz. cols. 346–354. ISBN 978-3-88309-544-8.
- ODNB article by Catie Gill, "Dewsbury, William (c. 1621–1688)", Oxford Dictionary of National Biography, Oxford University Press, 2004 accessed 13 Nov 2008 Link to online version - subscription
- Catalogue of the Library of the Religious Society of Friends, London

== See also ==
- Edward Burrough
- Alexander Parker
- Humphrey Smith
