= John Camm =

John Camm may refer to:

- John Camm (Anglican priest) (1718–1778), president of the College of William & Mary
- John Camm (Quaker preacher) (1604/5–1657), English Quaker preacher and writer
