= Dorcas Erbery =

- Born: Cardiff
- Known for: militant Quaker

Dorcas Erbery (fl. 1656–1659), was an English militant Quaker preacher. She was arrested with others in Bristol for blasphemy. James Nayler was convicted and he was sentenced by the English parliament to cruel and unusual punishment.

== Life ==
Erbery was probably born in Cardiff. Her mother, Mary, was a Quaker preacher and her father, William, was an unconventional member of the clergy. He expected that a regime of 'saints' would (in the later 1640s) carry out God's will in England.

She came to notice in June 1656 when she and her mother were arrested in Cardiff. Mary and Dorcas Erbery were arrested with Toby Hodge because the three of them had been disrupting the service of an established clergyman and they were sent to prison.

Her biography is shaped by the actions in Bristol on 24 October 1656. On this day James Nayler who had just been released from jail in Exeter made a ceremonial entry into the city of Bristol. He was riding a horse and accompanied by his supporters. They were welcomed by local Quakers, but the authorities considered their behaviour blasphemous as they were reenacting Jesus Christ's entry into Jerusalem.

On the 27 October they were questioned by local magistrates. Dorcas said that James Nayler had raised from the dead despite the denials of Nayler. Nayler and some of his followers were apprehended and examined before Parliament. It was found that Nayler's followers had referred to him by such titles as "Lord", "Prince of Peace", etc., apparently believing that Nayler was in some manner representing the return of Jesus Christ. Hannah Stranger refused to say if she called him "Jesus", but Erbery was noted for calling him "son of God". On 16 December 1656 he was convicted of blasphemy in a highly publicised trial before the Second Protectorate Parliament. Narrowly escaping execution, he was sentenced to be put in the pillory and on there to have a red-hot iron bored through his tongue, and also to be branded with the letter B for Blasphemer on his forehead, and other public humiliations. Erbery, Martha Simmonds and Hannah Stranger gathered around the pillory where Nayler was tortured in a way that recalled the followers of Christ at his crucifixion.

Subsequently, Nayler was imprisoned for two years of hard labour.
