= Christopher Atkinson =

Christopher Atkinson may refer to:

- Christopher Atkinson (missionary) (fl. 1652–1655), early Quaker missionary from Westmorland and one of the Valiant Sixty
- Christopher Atkinson Saville (c. 1738–1819), English merchant and politician

== See also ==
- Atkinson (surname)
