= Evelyn Hill =

Evelyn Hill may refer to:

- Evelyn Hill (cricketer) (1907–1953), English cricketer
- Evelyn Hill (footballer) (1859–1915), English footballer and Church of England clergyman
