= Ocle Priory =

Benedictine monastery in Herefordshire, England

Coordinates: 52.1139°N 2.6178°W

Ocle Priory was a priory near Ocle Pychard in Herefordshire, England at grid reference SO577464. It was a dependency of Lyre Abbey in Normandy and as such an alien priory.
