= Thomas Aldham =

English Quaker and farmer, c. 1616–1660

Thomas Aldham or Aldam (c. 1616–1660) was an English farmer, who was prominent in spreading Quakerism in the Doncaster district. He worked hard to combat wrongful imprisonment of fellow Quakers.

== Founder ==
Nothing is known of Aldham's parentage. He farmed successfully at Warmsworth, near Doncaster. In 1644, he married Mary Killam (died 1660), whom her son Thomas described as "a Woman that truly feared God, and served him in her Day and Generation." Aldham's son William was instrumental in opening the first permanent Quaker meeting house in the area, a building that survives as a private house in Quaker Lane.

Aldham was an early disciple of George Fox, with whom he was instrumental in establishing the Balby meeting. Fox, who had suffered violent assaults in Tickhill and Doncaster, preached for several hours under a walnut tree in Balby in 1652 to a large crowd. (A chair in the present Doncaster Meeting House is made of wood from this tree and a table made of it was sent to America in 1967.)

== Imprisoned ==
Aldham was imprisoned in York in 1652 for speaking in a "steeple-house" (church), and fined 40 shillings for refusing to pay taxes, keeping on his hat, and saying "thou" to the judge, in keeping with the Quaker refusal to recognize ranks among men. He was imprisoned but released after two-and-a-half years, upon application, it is said, to Oliver Cromwell. He then travelled to various prisons where Quakers were confined and tried to obtain their release. He was attacked physically by non-Quakers in 1654, 1655, and 1658. He prophesied the downfall of the Protector for disregarding his petitions, but said of Charles II of England, "I find nothing to this Man." Aldham is counted among the Valiant Sixty, who were active in the early days of the Religious Society of Friends. He died in Warmsworth in April 1660.

== Writings ==
During Aldham's lifetime, the Friends grew from a small group of northern religious separatists into a national movement. Most of his writings date from the period of his imprisonment. They show an interest in wider Quaker affairs. He set about establishing contacts between northern Quakers and printers in London, and promoting the first general Quaker fund for missionary work.

According to Catie Gill, author of his entry in the Oxford Dictionary of National Biography, "His political and religious ideas were sometimes quite theatrically expressed. A parliamentarian sympathizer, he nevertheless once tore his hat into shreds when he was granted an audience with Oliver Cromwell, indicating, it seems, the certain belief that the protector would soon be torn from power." He did much to document and protest against the wrongful imprisonment of Quakers. Several of his letters appeared as or in tracts in the early 1650s, and in volume form in 1690.
