= Humber, Herefordshire =

Hamlet in Herefordshire, England

Humber
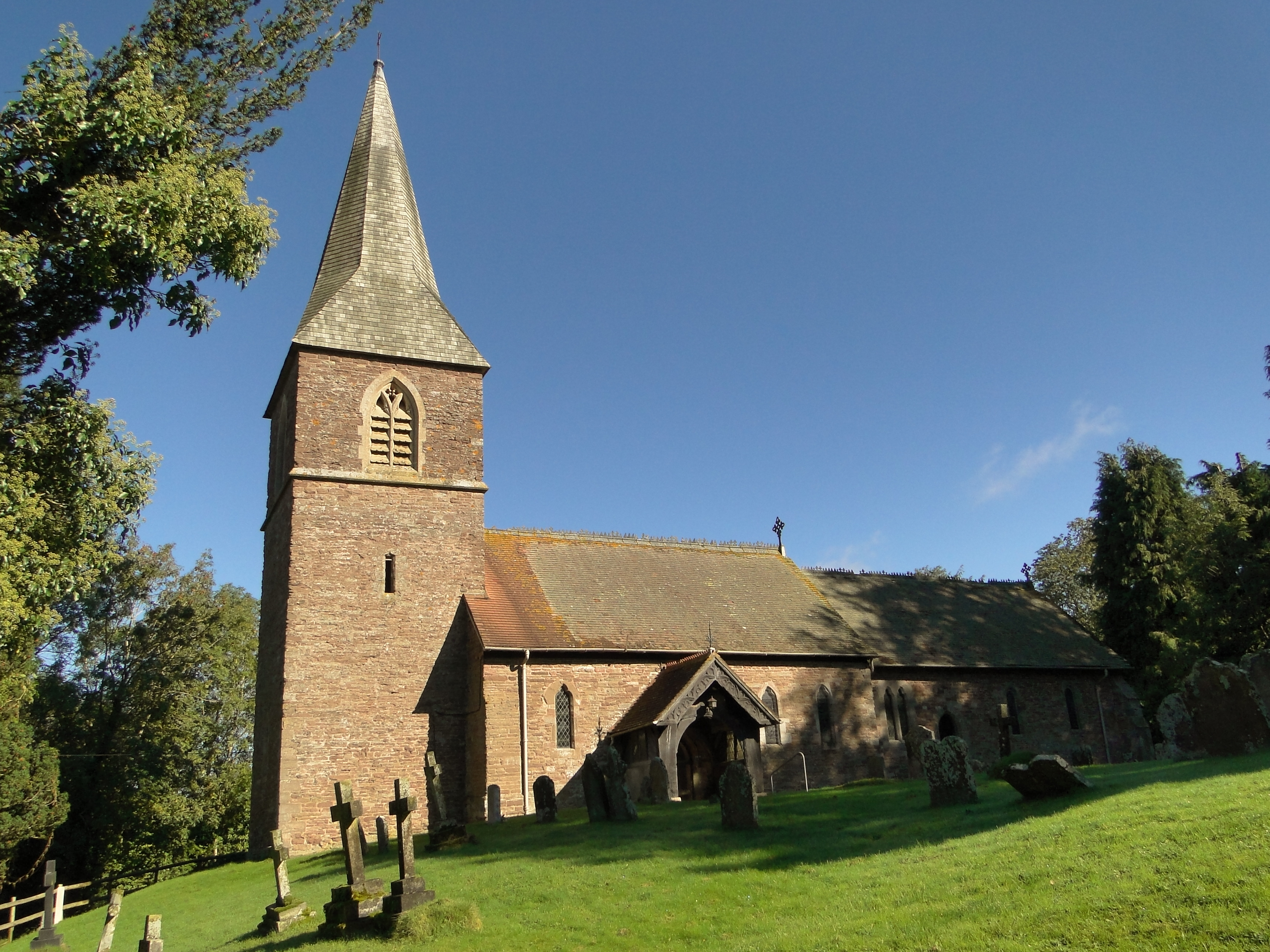
- St Mary's Church, Humber

- Location within Herefordshire
- OS grid reference: SO537563
  - London: 120 mi (190 km) SE
- Unitary authority: Herefordshire
- Ceremonial county: Herefordshire
- Region: West Midlands
- Country: England
- Sovereign state: United Kingdom
- Post town: Leominster
- Postcode district: HR6
- Dialling code: 01568
- Police: West Mercia
- Fire: Hereford and Worcester
- Ambulance: West Midlands
- UK Parliament: North Herefordshire

Humber is a hamlet and civil parish in the county of Herefordshire, England, and is 10 miles (16 km) north from the city and county town of Hereford. The closest large town is Leominster 3 miles (5 km) to the north-west.

== History ==
The name Humber derives from the pre-English name for a river. Within Humber were two manors, listed in the Domesday Book, Humber and Risbury. At the time of the Norman Conquest both were in the Hundred of Leominster in the county of Herefordshire. Humber is listed as "Humbre", with assets of 11 villagers, 22 smallholders (middle level of serf below a villager), 16 slaves and two priests. Working the ploughlands were three lord's and ten men's plough teams. The manor contained one league of woodland and two mills. The lords of the various local manors, including Humber, were Leofwin (the interpreter), Ralph of Mortimer, Roger de Lacy, Urse d'Abetot, and William son of Norman. In 1086 the lordship of Humber was passed to Queen Edith under the tenant-in-chief and king William I. Risbury is listed with eight households, one villager, three smallholders, four slaves, two lord's plough teams, and one mill. In 1066 Edwin held the lordship, which passed in 1086 to Robert, with William d'Ecouis as tenant-in-chief under Queen Edith as overlord for William I.

== Geography ==
Humber parish, of L-plan, is approximately 2 miles (3 km) from north to south and 3 miles (5 km) east to west. Adjacent parishes are Docklow and Hampton Wafer at the north, Grendon Bishop at the north-east, Pencombe with Grendon Warren at both the east and south-east, Bodenham at the south, and Ford and Stoke Prior at the west. The parish is rural, of farms, fields, managed woodland and coppices, streams, isolated and dispersed businesses, and residential properties, the nucleated settlements being the hamlets of Humber at the extreme west of the parish, and Risbury approximately at the centre. Even smaller parish settlements are Steen's Bridge at the extreme north-west, and Great Marston at the east with the adjacent Marston Stannet farther east. The only major route is the A44 Worcester Road which begins locally at Leominster, and runs to Bromyard at 6 miles (10 km) to the east of the parish, and which forms the northern boundary with Docklow and Hampton Wafer. All other routes are minor roads, country lanes, bridleways, farm tracks and footpaths. The hamlet of Humber consists of a farm and the parish church of St Mary the Virgin.

== Governance ==
Humber is represented in the lowest tier of UK governance by five members on the eleven-member Humber, Ford and Stoke Prior Parish Council. As Herefordshire is a unitary authority—no district council between parish and county councils—the parish sends one councillor, representing the Hampton Ward, to Herefordshire County Council. Humber is represent in the UK Parliament as part of the North Herefordshire constituency.

In 1974 Humber became part of the Malvern Hills District of the county of Hereford and Worcester county, instituted under the Local Government Act 1972.

== Landmarks ==
Within the parish are two Grade II* and twelve Grade II listed buildings and structures, and three scheduled monuments, including the Church of St Mary, dating to 1200, the 17th-century Humber Court, and the 18th-century Risbury Mill. At 220 yards (200 m) south-east from the church is the site of a Deserted medieval village (at 52.20196°N 2.678644°W), and just to the south from the A44 road is the site of Steens Bridge railway station (at 52.211507°N 2.66989°W), closed 1964, which was on the Leominster Junction to Worcester line of the Leominster and Worcester Branch Railway. Risbury Camp, at 700 yards (640 m) north-west from Risbury, is the site of an Iron Age hill fort.
