= Listed buildings in Underbarrow and Bradleyfield =

Underbarrow and Bradleyfield is a civil parish in Westmorland and Furness, Cumbria, England. It contains 33 listed buildings that are recorded in the National Heritage List for England. Of these, one is listed at Grade II*, the middle of the three grades, and the others are at Grade II, the lowest grade. The parish is in the Lake District National Park. It contains the small village of Underbarrow, and is otherwise completely rural. The listed buildings include a church and a bridge, and all the others are farmhouses, farm buildings, and houses with associated structures.

== Key ==
Grade	Criteria
II*	Particularly important buildings of more than special interest
II	Buildings of national importance and special interest

== Buildings ==
Name and location	Photograph	Date	Notes	Grade
Henry's Castle; 54.31303°N 2.80853°W		Late medieval	A dwelling, later an agricultural building, it is in limewashed limestone with quoins, and has a Westmorland slate roof with a sandstone ridge and rough coping. There are two storeys and a rectangular plan. On the east front is a square window on each floor, and the west front has an entrance, a blocked window and a pitching door.	II*
Gatehouse, Cunswick Hall; 54.33312°N 2.79258°W	—	Early 16th century (probable)	The gatehouse is in limestone, and has voussoirs, and a green slate roof with a stone ridge. Above the north arch are the Tudor coat of arms.	II
Broad Oak Farmhouse and outbuildings 54.31878°N 2.81845°W	—	1565	The outbuildings have been incorporated into the house, which is roughcast with a green slate roof and stone ridge tiles. On the front is a gabled porch, and the windows are 20th-century casements. Inside the house is an inglenook with an iron crane.	II
Low Blakebank Farmhouse; 54.31520°N 2.83703°W	—	17th century	A roughcast stone farmhouse with a slate roof, two storeys and three bays. It has a central porch with a stone-slab roof, and most of the windows are sashes.	II
Nook Cottage; 54.32440°N 2.82361°W	—	17th century	A stone cottage that has a slate roof with a stone ridge, two storeys and two bays. The doorway is in the centre, and there are two casement windows and two sash windows on the front.	II
Tranthwaite Hall Farmhouse; 54.33010°N 2.81645°W		17th century	The farmhouse was extended to the south in the 19th century. It is in stone and has a slate roof, and two storeys. The windows are sashes, those in the north front being horizontally-sliding. On the south front is a door with a lean-to porch.	II
Underhill; 54.32393°N 2.82376°W	—	17th century	A roughcast stone house with a slate roof, two storeys and three bays. It has a central stone porch with benches and a slate roof. There is one casement window, the other windows being sashes.	II
Fallen Yew Farmhouse; 54.32293°N 2.82022°W		Mid-17th century	A cross-wing was added to the southeast later, giving a T-shaped plan. The farmhouse is roughcast with a slate roof, a lean-to porch, and has two storeys. Some windows are mullioned, some are sashes, and there is one casement window.	II
Parks Farmhouse and outbuildings 54.31256°N 2.81566°W	—	Late 17th or early 18th century	The farmhouse and outbuildings are in stone with protruding through-stones and a slate roof. The house has two storeys and three irregular bays. On the front is a central door and casement windows. To the left is a lower stable with a granary above, and to the right is a higher barn with a cart entrance and a door.	II
Barn to North of Fallen Yew Farmhouse; 54.32316°N 2.82019°W	—	18th century (probable)	A bank barn in stone with limestone quoins, and a slate roof with a stone ridge. There are two storeys, with barn entrances on both sides in the upper floor. In the lower floor are byres with a canopy.	II
Toll Bar Cottage; 54.32296°N 2.79776°W	—	18th century	A former toll house, it is in rendered stone and has a slate roof with a stone ridge, and one storey. There is a central doorway with a stone-slab porch flanked by round-headed windows.	II
Barn to northeast of Tranthwaite Hall Farmhouse; 54.33037°N 2.81649°W	—	18th century	The earliest part is the east wing, the north wing added in the 19th century. The barn is in stone with limestone quoins, and has a slate roof with a stone ridge. The east wing contains boulders and through-stones. The building includes bank barns, cow houses, and stables.	II
Barn to southeast of Tranthwaite Hall Farmhouse; 54.33010°N 2.81645°W	—	18th century (probable)	The barn is in stone with limestone quoins and a slate roof. There is a cart shed in the upper floor, and stables and a cow house below.	II
Barn to southeast of Beckside Farmhouse; 54.33648°N 2.82769°W	—	1809	A bank barn in slate and stone with limestone and slate quoins and a slate roof. In the gable end is a datestone.	II
Low Gregghall Farmhouse; 54.31606°N 2.82446°W	—	c. 1820	A rendered farmhouse with a slate roof, two storeys, three bays, and a single-storey wing to the left. The central doorway has reeded pilasters and an entablature, and the windows are sashes.	II
Walls, gate piers and gates, Low Gregghall Farm; 54.31618°N 2.82459°W	—	c. 1820	At the entrance to the farmyard are curved limestone walls with stone parapets. There are wrought iron gates with palmette finials, flanked by limestone gate piers with ball finials.	II
Tullythwaite House; 54.31661°N 2.81298°W		c. 1820	A rendered stone house with quoins, a band, and a slate roof. There are two storeys, four bays, and a double span roof. The doorway has a round-arched opening with impost blocks and a keystone. To the left are two canted bay windows, and the other windows are sashes.	II
Beckside Farmhouse and garden walls 54.33662°N 2.82801°W	—	Early 19th century	The farmhouse is in roughcast stone with limestone quoins, a sill band, and a slate roof. There are two storeys and three bays. On the front is a stone porch, the doorway has a triangular fanlight, and the windows are sashes. Enclosing the front garden is a slate wall with iron railings and limestone gate posts.	II
Bridge to west of Beckside Farmhouse; 54.33689°N 2.82893°W	—	Early 19th century (probable)	The bridge carries a narrow track over a stream. It is in limestone and consists of a single small arch. The bridge has slate coping and voussoirs, and low parapets.	II
Summer house, Bradleyfield House; 54.32487°N 2.77698°W	—	Early 19th century	The summer house has a square plan, it is in limestone with quoins, and has a pyramidal slate roof. It contains sash windows.	II
Wall, railings and gate piers to east of Hollin Bank; 54.31473°N 2.83386°W	—	Early 19th century (probable)	The walls are in stone with limestone coping, and carry decorative cast iron railings. The gate piers are also in limestone, and the gate dates from the 20th century.	II
Walls, gates and railings, Tullythwaite House; 54.31641°N 2.81296°W	—	Early 19th century (probable)	On the east side of the garden is a drystone wall ending with a pyramidal cap. In front of the garden is a low wall with wrought iron railings and an ornamental wrought iron gate.	II
Cunswick Hall; 54.33354°N 2.79268°W	—	19th century	The house contains material from the 16th and 18th centuries. It is in stone, and has a slate roof with a stone ridge. There are two storeys and two wings, giving an L-shaped plan. The doorway has a chamfered surround and a rectangular fanlight, and the windows are sashes.	II
Barn to west of Low Blakebank Farmhouse; 54.31526°N 2.83747°W	—	19th century	A bank barn in stone with protruding through-stones and a small lean-to at the west end. On the north side is a cart entrance, and on the south side is an entrance door and a loading door. There is another entrance door at the east end, and a side door has limestone voussoirs. There are three 19th-century windows in the lower floor.	II
Barn and walls to northeast of Low Gregghall Farmhouse; 54.31624°N 2.82433°W	—	19th century	The barn is in stone with a slate roof, and contains a cartshed, hay loft and cowsheds. The cart entrance has limestone voussoirs, and there are pigeon holes in the west gable.	II
Redscar Farmhouse (Southernmost); 54.32149°N 2.83515°W	—	Mid-19th century	A roughcast stone farmhouse with a slate roof, two storeys with an attic and two bays. On the front is a gabled timber porch with a slate roof, and the windows are sashes.	II
Barn to east of Tullythwaite House; 54.31658°N 2.81273°W	—	Mid-19th century	The barn is in stone on a plinth, with quoins, a slate roof, and two storeys. In the lower storey are doors and windows with segmental arches and voussoirs, and in the upper storey is one small opening.	II
Hollin Bank and Hollin Cottage; 54.31465°N 2.83484°W	—	1853	A house and attached cottage in stone with limestone dressings, and a slate roof with coped gables. There are two storeys, the main part has five bays and there is a wing recessed on the right. The central bay of the main part projects forward under a gable with a tulip finial, and the windows are sashes with hood moulds on the ground floor. The cottage on the left has a gabled stone porch with a ball finial. On the side of the wing is an oriel window.	II
Gazebo; 54.32841°N 2.76575°W		c. 1860	The gazebo is in the grounds of Southernmost House. It is in limestone, partly rendered, and has an octagonal plan. There is a pyramidal roof with a lead finial, and a cast iron ogee gutter. There are two doors, and round-headed windows containing stained glass.	II
All Saints Church; 54.32644°N 2.82687°W		1869	The church, which replaced an earlier church on the site, is in stone, with limestone and sandstone quoins and dressings, slate voussoirs, and a slate roof with a stone ridge. It is in Early English style, and consists of a nave, transepts, a chancel with a polygonal apse, and a southwest tower incorporating a porch. The tower is octagonal with three stages, and has a small spire with lucarnes and a weathercock. The doorway has a pointed arch and has dog-tooth moulding.	II
Barn to east of Gatehouse at Cunswick Hall; 54.33292°N 2.79232°W	—	Undated	The barn is in limestone with a green slate roof and blue glazed ridge tiles. The doors and windows date from the 20th century.	II
Barn to west of Gatehouse at Cunswick Hall; 54.33291°N 2.79297°W	—	Undated	A limestone barn with a slate roof, and a stone ridge, copings and kneelers. It consists of a hay barn over a cowhouse, with ventilation slits, and inside are eleven bays.	II
Barn to northeast of Redscar Farmhouse (Southernmost); 54.32163°N 2.83476°W	—	Undated	A bank barn in slate and stone, with a slate roof and two storeys. It has a cart entrance to the barn at the rear with entrances to the cow sheds below.	II
