= Thomas Camm (preacher) =

Camm, Thomas (1640/41–1708), Quaker preacher and writer

- Born: 1641; Camsgill, Westmorland
- Died: 1707 (aged 65–66); Eldworth, Yorkshire
- Spouse: Ann Audland (m. 1666; died 1705)
- Children: 2 daughters

Thomas Camm (1641–1707) was an English Quaker minister and writer. He was imprisoned for not paying tithes in 1674; fined for unlicensed preaching in 1678; and imprisoned, probably for preaching, from 1680 to 1686. He published religious tracts.

== Early life ==
Thomas Camm, born at Camsgill, Preston Patrick, Westmoreland, in 1641, was the son of John Camm, yeoman, and his wife, Mabel (c. 1605–1692). As both his parents were Quakers, he was raised in their faith, receiving a good education from his father, whose "tender care", says Camm in his Testimony, "was great for the education of me, and the rest of his children". Having been brought up in the Quaker faith, at an early age he became one of its ministers and travelled widely to spread the message; he wrote a number of Quaker works.

== Religious persecution ==
Camm suffered imprisonment and other forms of persecution in the Quaker cause. In 1660 he was incarcerated in Lancashire for refusing the Oath of Allegiance. In 1674 he was sued by John Ormrod, Vicar of Burton, near Kendal, for small tithes and oblations, and in default of payment was imprisoned for three years. In 1678 a magistrate broke up a meeting of Quakers held at Ackmonthwaite, committed several Friends to prison, and also seems to have fined them, for Camm, who had been the preacher at the meeting, lost nine head of cattle and fifty-five sheep, worth over £31. Shortly after this another distraint was made upon his property by warrant from the same justice. Later in Westmoreland, in 1690, he paid over £20 relating to tithes of corn. Somewhat later he was imprisoned for nearly six years in Appleby Gaol, probably for some offence against the Conventicle Act.

== Marriage ==
Thomas married Anne Audland, née Newby (1627–1705). They had two daughters, Mary (later Moore) and Sarah, who died of smallpox and fever at the age of almost nine, an event which was commemorated in a joint work with his wife entitled The Admirable and Glorious Appearance of the Eternal God in and through a Child, 1684.

== Quaker schism ==
Camm did much to prevent the growth of the schisms to which Quakerism at that time was liable. He became involved in the Wilkinson-Story Separation (a breakaway group within the Quaker movement), and wrote against William Rogers and John Story, two of the leaders. In 1684 he penned The Line of Truth and True Judgement in response to a pro-Wilkinson-Story pamphlet (The Memory of that Servant of God John Story Revived, 1683), and accused its authors in his epistle to the reader of "bitter and ungodly false reflections against Friends", which he claimed were an attempt to "stir up persecution against us, and to render truth odious". Apparently, Camm had himself flirted with separation, for he wrote a testimony against himself in 1677, which is in the Kendal monthly minute book.

== Death ==
Camm continued his preaching expeditions until he was advanced in years. He died at Eldworth, Yorkshire, at the home of his daughter and her husband. He had suffered from a short illness which left him unable to eat due to the ensuing pain and incapable of sleep. He was buried at the Quaker burial-ground, Park End, Preston Patrick, near Camsgill.

== Works ==
Camm wrote considerably, and his works were fairly popular among the early Friends, but they are now forgotten; a full list is given in Joseph Smith's Catalogue of Friends' Books. The most important are:

1. The Line of Truth and True Judgement stretched over the heads of Falsehood and Deceit … 1684.
2. The Admirable and Glorious Appearance of the Eternal God, … 1684.
3. Thomas Camm's Testimony concerning John Camm and John Audland, 1689.
4. A Testimony to the fulfilling the Promise of God relating to … prophetesses, … 1689.
5. An Old Apostate justly exposed, 1698.
6. A Lying Tongue reproved, … 1708.

== Sources ==
- Leachman, Caroline L. (2004). "Camm, Thomas (1640/41–1708), Quaker preacher and writer". Oxford Dictionary of National Biography (online ed.). Oxford University Press. doi:10.1093/ref:odnb/4459. (Subscription, Wikipedia Library access or UK public library membership required.)
- Smith, Joseph (1867). A Descriptive Catalogue of Friends' Books. Vol. 1. London: R. Barrett & Sons. pp. 377–378.

Attribution:

- This article incorporates text from a publication now in the public domain: Bickley, Augustus Charles (1886). "Camm, Thomas". In Stephen, Leslie (ed.). Dictionary of National Biography. Vol. 8. London: Smith, Elder & Co. pp. 304–305.
