= Underbarrow =

Village in Cumbria, England

Coordinates: 54.322°N 2.820°W

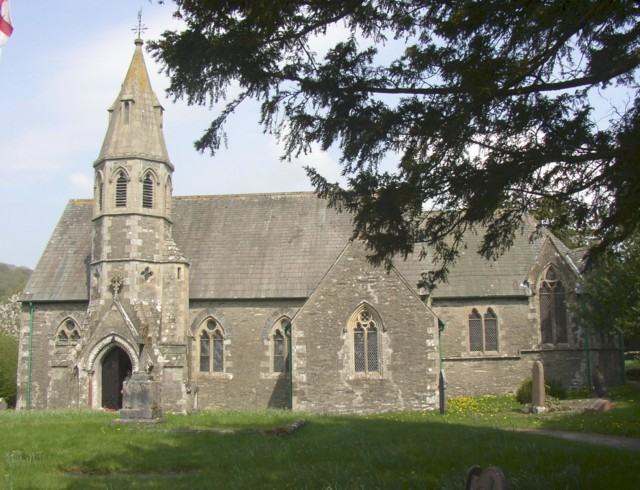
- All Saints Church

- Location in South Lakeland Location within Cumbria
- Population: 330 (2011)
- OS grid reference: SD467921
- Civil parish: Underbarrow and Bradleyfield
- Unitary authority: Westmorland and Furness
- Ceremonial county: Cumbria
- Region: North West
- Country: England
- Sovereign state: United Kingdom
- Post town: Kendal
- Postcode district: LA8
- Dialling code: 01539
- Police: Cumbria
- Fire: Cumbria
- Ambulance: North West
- UK Parliament: Westmorland and Lonsdale

Underbarrow is a small village in Cumbria, England, located 3 miles (4.8 km) west of Kendal. The village is in the Lake District National Park. It is in the civil parish of Underbarrow and Bradleyfield, in Westmorland and Furness district, and has a parish council. In the 2001 census Underbarrow and Bradleyfield had a population of 351, decreasing at the 2011 census to 330.

== Politics ==
In 1974 under the Local Government Act 1972 Underbarrow became a part of the South Lakeland district whose administrative centre is Kendal. In 2023 the South Lakeland district was abolished and the town is now part of the Westmorland and Furness district.

Underbarrow is part of the Westmorland and Lonsdale parliamentary constituency for which Tim Farron is the current MP representing the Liberal Democrats.

== Famous residents ==
- Edward Burrough (1634–1663), the Quaker, was born here

== See also ==
- Listed buildings in Underbarrow and Bradleyfield
- Kendal
- Westmorland and Furness
