= Humphrey Smith (Quaker) =

English Quaker preacher

Humphrey Smith (died 1663) was an English Quaker preacher.

== Life ==
Smith probably lived in Little Cowarne, Herefordshire and preached in Andover, Hampshire. He was repeatedly arrested for preaching and wrote most of his books in Winchester gaol. He died of gaol fever (typhus). From the record of the Quaker Burial Ground at Bramshott, Hampshire: "Humphrey Smith who upon the 14th day of the eighth month 1662 was committed to the county goal at Winchester for being at an unlawful meeting at Alton and a ringleader and one of the chief of the Quakers there. He has remained in gaol until the day of his decease and was buried at Bramshott the 6th day of the third month 1663." Source: England & Wales, Society Of Friends (Quaker) Burials 1578-1841.

== Works ==
- ‘Something in Reply to Edmund Skipp's “The World's Wonder, or the Quaker's Blazing Star,” &c.’ London, 1655, 4to. Skipp was a preacher at Bodenham, Herefordshire.
- ‘The Sufferings … of the Saints at Evesham’ [1656], 4to.
- ‘An Alarum sounding forth,’ 1658, 4to.
- ‘Divine Love spreading forth over all Nations,’ London, n.d., 4to.
- ‘The True and Everlasting Rule,’ 1658, 4to.
- ‘Hidden Things made manifest by the Light,’ 1658, 4to, reprinted 1664.
- ‘To all Parents of Children,’ 1660 8vo; 2nd edit., 1667.
- ‘For the Honour of the King,’ 1661, 4to.
- ‘Sound Things asserted,’ 1662, 4to.
- ‘Forty-four Queries propounded to all the Clergymen of the Liturgy, by One whom they trained up,’ 1662, 4to.
- The Principles of truth: being a declaration of our faith, who are called Quakers, whereby all that wants peace with God may return into their first state, through the operation of the light and power of God in the great work of regeneration / written by E.B., J.C., W.D., H.S. ([London? : s.n.], Printed in the Year, 1668), with John Crook, William Dewsbury, Alexander Parker, and Edward Burrough
