= Giles Calvert =

English printer

Giles Calvert (baptised 1612 – 1663) was a prominent printer during the Wars of the Three Kingdoms, developing a catalogue which included such notable preachers as John Saltmarsh.

== Life ==
Calvert was baptised in 1612. His father, George Calvert, was the vicar in Meare and he had been charged with not following guidance in his ministry. He and his brother, George, were publishers and booksellers based in the Black Spread Eagle in St Paul's Churchyard in London. They published and sold early Quaker publications including three by his sister Martha Simmonds. She became a Quaker in 1654–5 and she wrote several pamphlets. In 1655 he published When the Lord Jesus Came to Jerusalem and A Lamentation for the Lost Sheep of the House of Israel. Some time later Giles also published her work, O England, thy Time is Come.
