= Ann Blaykling =

Quaker preacher (fl. 1652–1708)

Ann(e) Blaykling (fl. 1652–1708) was an early British preacher for the Quakers.

== Ministry ==
She met George Fox in May 1652 when he preached in Sedbergh and he came to stay at Draw-Well farm where Anne lived with her brother, John, and her father, Thomas Blaykling. Ann's brother was a Puritan minister but it was John and Ann who became Quaker evangelists after hearing George Fox preach. Ann travelled in the south east and spread the word as far as Cornwall. She and similar early preachers were called the "First Publishers of Truth". In Cornwall she so alarmed one woman that she declared that she was "no woman, but a man". She was arrested and imprisoned several times including being imprisoned in Bury St Edmunds by order of Sir Thomas Barnardiston. She was charged with abusing the minister at Haverhill. She stood up to the Baptist John Bunyan.

She and the Quakers fell out for some years, but she eventually returned and married a fellow Quaker. Her date of death is unknown.
