= Edward Burrough =

English preacher and missionary

Edward Burrough (1634–1663) was an early English Quaker leader and controversialist. He is regarded as one of the Valiant Sixty, who were early Quaker preachers and missionaries.

== Convincement ==
Burrough was born in Underbarrow, Westmorland, and educated in the Church of England, but became a Presbyterian before becoming convinced (a Quaker term referring to conversion). During his late teens, he heard George Fox preach in 1652 and was convinced of the truth as understood by the Religious Society of Friends. He was consequently rejected by his parents. Burrough began itinerant preaching throughout England, travelling with another Friend, Francis Howgill. Among those converted by them was Hester Biddle, probably in 1654.

== Debate ==
During the years 1656–1657 Burrough and John Bunyan were engaged in a pamphlet debate, begun by Bunyan, who published Some Gospel Truths Opened, in which he attacked Quaker beliefs. Burrough responded with The True Faith of the Gospel of Peace. Bunyan countered with A Vindication of Some Gospel Truths Opened, which Burrough answered with Truth (the Strongest of All) Witnessed Forth. Later the Quaker leader George Fox entered the fray by publishing a refutation of Bunyan's essay in The Great Mystery of the Great Whore Unfolded.

== Intervention with the king ==
Upon the Restoration in 1660, Burrough approached King Charles II requesting protection and relief of Quakers in New England, who were being persecuted by Puritans there. Charles granted him an audience in 1661, and was persuaded to issue a writ stopping (temporarily) the corporal and capital punishments of the Quakers in Massachusetts.

Burrough arranged for the writ to be delivered by Samuel Shattuck, himself a Quaker under a ban from Massachusetts. Charles's writ commanded the Massachusetts authorities to send the imprisoned Quakers to England for trial, but they chose instead to release them. The king's order effectively stopped the hangings, but imprisonments and floggings were resumed the next year.

== Imprisonment and death ==
In 1662, Burrough was arrested for holding a meeting, which was illegal under the terms of the Quaker Act. He was sent to Newgate Prison, London.

An order for his release signed by Charles II was ignored by the local authorities, and Burrough remained in Newgate until his death on February 14, 1663, aged just 29 ("twelfth month 1662" in the Old Style and Quaker terminologies). He was buried in the Quaker Burying Ground, Bunhill Fields.

After his death, his collected works were published by E. Hookes in 1671 as The Memorable Works of a Son of Thunder and Consolation: Namely, that True Prophet, and Faithful Servant of God, and Sufferer for the Testimony of Jesus, Edward Burroughs, who Dyed a Prisoner for the Word of God, in the City of London, the Fourteenth of the Twelfth Moneth, 1662.

== Publications ==
Burrough’s publications include;

- For the souldiers, and all the officers of England, Scotland and Ireland a warning from the Lord, that they forget not his kindness, but call to mind his mercies, and their own promises. ([London : s.n., 1654])
- A declaration from the people called Quakers, to the present distracted nation of England with mourning and lamentation over it, because of its breaches ... (London : [s.n.], 1659)
- The everlasting gospel of repentance and remission of sins ... by ... Edward Burrough. (London : Printed for Robert Wilson ..., [1660?])
- A general epistle to all the saints being a visitation of the Fathers love unto the whole flock of God ... : to be read in all the assemblies, of them, that meet together to worship the Father in the spirit and truth ... / E.B. (London : Printed for Robert Wilson ..., 1660)
- The case of the people called Quakers (once more) stated, and published to the world with the accusations charged upon them, and their answers. (London : [s.n., 1662?])
- The Principles of truth: being a declaration of our faith, who are called Quakers, whereby all that wants peace with God may return into their first state, through the operation of the light and power of God in the great work of regeneration / written by E.B., J.C., W.D., H.S. ([London? : s.n.], Printed in the Year, 1668), with John Crook, William Dewsbury, Alexander Parker, and Humphrey Smith
- The Life of Edward Burrough

== In popular culture ==
- New Model Army's fourth album, Thunder and Consolation, was named as a reference to his collected works, The Memorable Works of a Son of Thunder and Consolation.
