= Thomas Ayrey =

Thomas Ayrey (c.1600 - ?) was an early member of the Society of Friends and one of the Valiant Sixty. He was one of the first Friends to preach in Devon, in 1655.
