= Martha Simmonds =

English Quaker and author

- Born: Martha Calvert c. 1624 probably Somerset
- Died: 1665
- Occupation: evangelist

Martha Simmonds (or Simmons; née Calvert; baptized 1624 – 1665) was an English Quaker and author. She published a number of pamphlets after her conversion. She then obtained a release for James Naylor from Exeter jail. She then proceeded with him where he entered Bristol in what was judged to be a blasphemous manner. Naylor escaped with his life, but he was given cruel punishment.

== Life ==
Calvert was baptised in 1624. Her father, George Calvert, was the vicar in Meare and her mother was Ann Collier. Her father had married once before and he had been charged with not following guidance in his ministry. Her elder brothers Giles and George, were publishers and booksellers based in the Black Spread Eagle in St Paul's Churchyard in London. Her brothers published and sold early Quaker publications including three by Martha. She had become a Quaker in 1654–55 and she wrote several pamphlets. In 1655 her brother published When the Lord Jesus Came to Jerusalem and A Lamentation for the Lost Sheep of the House of Israel. Some time later Giles also published her work, O England, thy Time is Come in which she records two years of publicly repenting in local settlements.

In 1656 the second edition of her pamphlet Lamentation was published which included details of her life and her first two publications.

By the end of 1655, she had married Thomas Simmonds (or Simmons) who had been a printer in Birmingham. He was known to her father and brother. She had been sent to prison after she appeared in Colchester in sackcloth and ashes and for disturbing the peace of church services.

She is known for her involvement with James Naylor. Naylor was said to have been under a spell when he first met Martha. They spent three days together and George Fox alleged that Simmonds was a witch. Naylor was only separated from her by force by fellow Quakers.

Naylor's later entered Bristol on a horse, as if it was Jerusalem, accompanied by Hannah and Martha where they were met by local Quakers. They were soon arrested and Naylor was charged with blasphemy for pretending to be Jesus Christ. Her husband believed that she had been a leader in this event and more recent studies have accused Simmonds of inspiring the event.

On December 27, Naylor's punishment was carried out. This included having his tongue pierced with a hot spike and a "B" branded on his forehead. Hannah, Martha Simmonds and Dorcas Erbery were at the base of his pillory mirroring the three Marys who were at Jesus's crucifixion.

She died in 1665, although the day and location are unclear. She was estranged from the Quakers and her sister-in-law Elizabeth Calvert, who was still a printer, had also lost faith with the Quakers.
