= Evelyn Hill (footballer) =

English footballer

The Rev. Evelyn Hill
Personal information
- Full name: Evelyn Henry Hill
- Date of birth: 21 April 1859
- Place of birth: Felton, Herefordshire
- Date of death: 21 April 1915 (aged 56)
- Place of death: Droitwich, Worcestershire
- Position: Forward

Senior career*
Years	Team	Apps	(Gls)
1880–81	Oxford University		
- * Club domestic league appearances and goals

Evelyn Henry Hill (5 April 1859 – 21 April 1915) was an association footballer and Church of England clergyman, who played in the 1880 FA Cup final.

== Early life ==
Hill was the son of the Rev. Henry Thomas Hill, the rector of Felton, Herefordshire, and he was baptized there on 15 May 1859. He was educated at Malvern College from 1876 to 1877, and went up to Oriel College, Oxford in January 1878, aged 18. He took his bachelor of arts in jurisprudence in 1882, although he only recorded a Fourth Class degree.

== Sporting career ==
Hill was a useful cricketer, both with the bat and the ball, representing Herefordshire in 1878 and 1879, and had been part of the "Next XVI" at university.

There is however no record of Hill playing football before attending university; the first match he is noted as playing was at Maidenhead in the fourth round of the 1879–80 FA Cup as a right-sided forward - it was an auspicious debut as Hill scored the only goal, "breasting" home a ball which had spilt out of a goal-line scrimmage.

He played in the remaining Cup ties, and had a hand in the winning goal against Nottingham Forest in the semi-final, his cross from the right resulting in defensive confusion and the ball being parried to George Childs to score. He remained on the right wing for the final, which the university lost to Clapham Rovers.

The final was his last Cup match; he played in both the 1880 and 1881 Varsity matches, both of which Cambridge University won. The 1881 match is his last recorded fixture.

== Post-football ==
First practising as a solicitor after being articled to E. A. Bigg in Bristol, Hill followed his father in taking holy orders. He became curate of Rugeley in 1888 and vicar of Brereton, Staffordshire in 1896.

He married Ida Childe-Freeman on 5 April 1883, in Whitbourne, Herefordshire, with Evelyn's brother and Ida's father officiating at the ceremony. Hill died in Droitwich in 1915.
