= John Camm (Quaker preacher) =

English Quaker preacher and writer

- Born: 1604; Camsgill, Westmoreland
- Died: 1655/6; Bristol
- Spouse: Mabel (m. 1641)
- Children: Thomas Camm

John Camm (1604–1655/6) was an early English Quaker preacher and writer. He joined the Quakers in 1652; came to London to interview Cromwell in 1654; and visited Bristol and London in 1656. He published religious tracts.

== Origins ==
John Camm was born at Camsgill, near Kendal, Westmoreland. He was a man of good birth and tolerable education, "as good as any of that degree in that part of the country", according to the Testimony of Thomas Camm, his son. A soldier in the Parliamentary army during the Civil Wars, Camm was a man of considerable property, being a successful yeoman. When comparatively young he left the national church and established a small religious society. He may have been a Presbyterian in Kendal by 1646, and later perhaps a Grindletonian, before joining the large gathering of Westmoreland Seekers.

== Marriage ==
By 1641 he had married Mabel (c. 1605–1692), later the wife of the Quaker Gervase Benson, and by her had a number of children, two of whom are known, Thomas and Ruth. The latter, however, died before her second birthday in 1656.

== Quakerism ==
About 1652, after hearing George Fox preach at Kendal, he embraced Quakerism. He speedily became a preacher, although, according to his son Thomas Camm's Testimony, it involved the renunciation of brilliant prospects. In 1654 he and Francis Howgill visited London, where he attempted to found a Quaker society. The principal object of their journey, however, was to "declare the message of the Lord to Oliver Cromwell, then called Protector", in favour of toleration. They were received very courteously, but Cromwell, supposing them to require the assistance of the law, gave them no encouragement. An interesting letter which Camm wrote to undeceive the Protector is still extant.

After revisiting the North, Camm spent a considerable time in London, and in 1654, in company with John Audland, visited Bristol. It is said that they were favourably received by the inhabitants until the clergy incited a mob to illtreat them and the magistrates to issue a warrant for their apprehension. Nothing further is known of Camm till 1656, when a letter records that he was residing at Preston Patrick, near Kendal. During the same year he again visited Bristol.

== Death ==
Camm was a man of weakly constitution, and he is said to have been usually obliged to take his son Thomas to wait on him. His bodily ailments rapidly increased, and, according to the register preserved at Devonshire House, Bishopsgate, he died of consumption at the end of 1656. Thomas Camm, in his Testimony, written in 1680, says he died in 1665, and the same date is given in Whiting's Catalogue.

== Works ==
Camm was an untiring minister. Although his literary ability was small and his style clumsy and obscure, his works were highly esteemed. His most important works are:

1. This is the Word of the Lord which John Camm and Francis Howgill was moved to declare and write to Oliver Cromwell, who is named Lord Protector, shewing the cause why they came to speak with him, … 1654.
2. A True Discovery of the Ignorance, Blindness, and Darkness of … Magistrates, … J. C. attributed to Camm, 1654.
3. Some Particulars concerning the Law sent to Oliver Cromwell, … 1654 (reprinted 1655).
4. The Memory of the Righteous revived, being a brief collection of the Books and Written Epistles of John Camm and John Audland, … 1689.

== Sources ==
- Leachman, Caroline L. (2004). "Camm, John (1605–1657), Quaker preacher". Oxford Dictionary of National Biography (online ed.). Oxford University Press. doi:10.1093/ref:odnb/4458. (Subscription, Wikipedia Library access or UK public library membership required.)
- Smith, Joseph (1867). A Descriptive Catalogue of Friends' Books. Vol. 1. London: R. Barrett & Sons. pp. 376–377.

Attribution:

- This article incorporates text from a publication now in the public domain: Bickley, Augustus Charles (1886). "Camm, John". In Stephen, Leslie (ed.). Dictionary of National Biography. Vol. 8. London: Smith, Elder & Co. p. 304.
