= Alexander Parker (Quaker) =

Alexander Parker (21 June 1628 – 8 March 1689) was a Quaker preacher and author.

He was born on 21 June 1628 at Chipping, Lancashire, England the son of Robert Parker. He was convinced and became a Quaker preacher, travelling widely in England and Scotland.

He wrote:

- A Testimony of the Light Within (1657)
- A Discovery of Satans Wiles (1657)
- Testimony of the Appearance of God (1658)
- A Tryall of a Christian (1658)
- A Call out of Egypt (1659)
- A Testimony of Truth (1659)
- An Epistle to Friends (1660)
- The Principles of truth: being a declaration of our faith, who are called Quakers, whereby all that wants peace with God may return into their first state, through the operation of the light and power of God in the great work of regeneration written by E.B., J.C., W.D., H.S. ([London? : s.n.], Printed in the Year, 1668), with John Crook, William Dewsbury, Humphrey Smith, and Edward Burrough

Parker was one of eighty-four Quakers who founded the six-weeks' meeting for the management of Quaker affairs, in October 1671.

On 8 August 1683 he, with George Whitehead, and Gilbert Latey, presented an address to King Charles II of England at Windsor on behalf of persecuted Friends. Parker accompanied George Fox to the Netherlands in 1684.

He died in London on 8 March 1689.

One of his letters to Friends, advising them on the holding of Meetings for Worship was included in current printed guidance for British Quakers.
