= Thomas Goodaire =

Thomas Goodaire (c. 1620 - ?) was an early member of the Society of Friends and an associate of George Fox. He may have come from Wakefield. He was later imprisoned in Warwick, and is regarded as one of the Valiant Sixty.

== Sources ==
- The Journal of George Fox -
