= Christopher Atkinson (missionary) =

Early missionary from Westmoreland

Christopher Atkinson (fl. 1652–5, dates of birth and death unknown) was an early Quaker missionary from Westmorland and one of the Valiant Sixty. Already married, he caused a minor scandal among the Society by attempting to seduce another woman.
