= Francis Howgill =

English Quaker among the Valiant Sixty 1618–1669

Francis Howgill (1618 – 11 February 1669) was a prominent early member of the Religious Society of Friends (Quakers) in England. He preached and wrote on the teachings of the Friends and is considered one of the Valiant Sixty, men and women who were early proponents of Friends' beliefs and suffered for them.

== Life ==
Howgill was born about 1618, probably of yeoman parents, in Todthorne, near Grayrigg, Westmorland in northern England. He probably made his living as a farmer and a tailor. He studied theology and in 1652 became a minister of the established church in Colton. He explored the teachings of the Anabaptists, the Independents, Seekers and Baptists: but shortly after, he and John Audland (another minister) encountered George Fox, an early leader in the Friends movement, preaching on Firbank Fell and were convinced. Soon after Howgill was imprisoned in Appleby-in-Westmorland for refusing to remove his hat when appearing in court in defence of James Nayler.

Afterwards he met Edward Burrough. The two spread the Quaker message together and became close friends. Among those they converted around 1654 was Hester Biddle. They established the Religious Society of Friends in London and also worked in Bristol and Ireland. Howgill published A Woe Against the Magistrates, Priests, and People of Kendall, (1654) endorsing the Quaker practice of "going naked as a sign". The Quakers in London came under the influence of Nayler and when Fox parted company with him in 1656, Howgill tried, unsuccessfully, to bring about a reconciliation. In 1657 he was in Scotland, and in 1661 he was in prison in London.

Howgill was married first to a woman named Dorothy. After her death in 1657 he married Mary, who is counted, along with him, as one of the Valiant Sixty, a group of early Quaker preachers and missionaries. After the Restoration he claimed, in his tract One Warning More (1660), that the nation had "chosen madness". In 1663 he refused to swear the oath of allegiance to the crown and was sentenced to life imprisonment at Appleby. During that time people came to support him and to seek advice. but his General Epistle (1665) showed pessimism as to any Quaker triumph over adversity. He became sick in prison and died on 11 February 1669. In 1676 a collection of his writings, The Dawnings of the Gospel-Day, and its Light and Glory Discovered, was published.

== See also ==
- English Dissenters
- Levellers
