= Ocle Pychard =

Hamlet in Herefordshire, England

Coordinates: 52.112814°N 2.592102°W

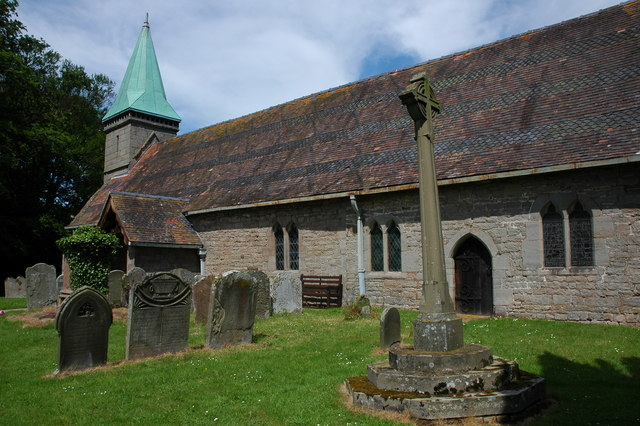
- The Church of St James the Great

- Location within Herefordshire
- Shire county: Herefordshire
- Region: West Midlands
- Country: England
- Sovereign state: United Kingdom
- Police: West Mercia
- Fire: Hereford and Worcester
- Ambulance: West Midlands

Ocle Pychard is a hamlet and parish near Burley Gate, in Herefordshire, England, 3.25 miles (5.23 km) northwest of Stoke Edith, 6 miles (9.7 km) southwest from Bromyard, and about 7 miles (11 km) northeast of Hereford. The parish of Stretton Grandison neighbours Ocle Pychard to the east, while that of Westhide is to the south. Once a larger settlement, its population was 187 in 1801, 236 in 1831, 224 in 1832, and 299 in 1861.

== History ==
Arms of de Lacy: Or a lion rampant purpure

At the time of the Domesday Book, Ocle Pychard was in the Hundred of Tornelaus, and contained 35 households. The population included 9 villagers, 11 smallholders (middle level of serf below a villager), and 13 slaves, with its assets listed as an area of land under plough defined by four lord's and ten men's plough teams. Roger de Lacy, the manor's co-lord with the Bishop of Hereford, was the tenant-in-chief to king William I.

Ocle Pichard, a section of Ocle, derived its additional name from a family which arrived soon after the Norman Conquest. Roger Pichard was mentioned in the Book of Fees during the reign of Henry III. Miles Picard, knight of the shire, was High Sheriff of Herefordshire in 1300–06. A Roger Picard, probably his son, served in the same capacity during the period of 1318-27, while the vicar John Pichard served Ocle Pychard's parish in 1446.

George Carpenter, 1st Baron Carpenter (1657–1732) was born at Livers Ocle in Ocle Pychard into a family which had owned property in the area for over 400 years. Its population in 1861 was 299; at the time the manor belonged to J. L. Harrison. It later fell into the hands of the Cresswell family.

== Landmarks ==
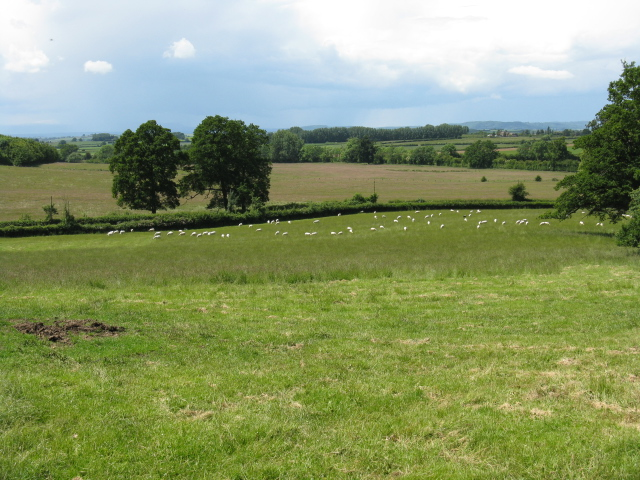
Sheep grazing near the church

The Church of St James the Great dates to the 14th century and became a Grade II* listed building on 9 June 1967. Built of "coursed local sandstone rubble with freestone dressings", the tower is believed to date to the early 19th century with a spire late added by William Chick between 1869 and 1872. The east window is Perpendicular architecture in style and the spire is of copper covering. Ocle Priory was in the vicinity. The Hereford and Gloucester Canal traverses the southern part of the parish. A primary school was located in Ocle Pychard in 1967, but it was replaced.

== Bibliography ==
- Bell, James (1835). A new and comprehensive gazetteer of England and Wales, illustr. by a series of maps. 4 vols. [in 2] (Public domain ed.).
- Cleveland, Catherine Lucy Wilhelmina Powlett, Duchess of (1889). The Battle Abbey Roll: With Some Account of the Norman Lineages (Public domain ed.). J. Murray.
- Cobbett, William (1832). A geographical dictionary of England and Wales. Wm. Cobbett.
- Duncumb, John; Cooke, William; Watkins, Morgan George; Matthews, John Hobson (1897). Collections Towards the History and Antiquities of the County of Hereford: . Hundred of Grimsworth (Public domain ed.). E. G. Wright.
- Fleming, Robin (18 December 2003). Domesday Book and the Law: Society and Legal Custom in Early Medieval England. Cambridge University Press. ISBN 978-0-521-52846-7.
- Pevsner, Nikolaus (1963). Herefordshire. Penguin Books. ISBN 978-0-14-071025-0.
