= Risbury =

Coordinates: 52.1921°N 2.6621°W

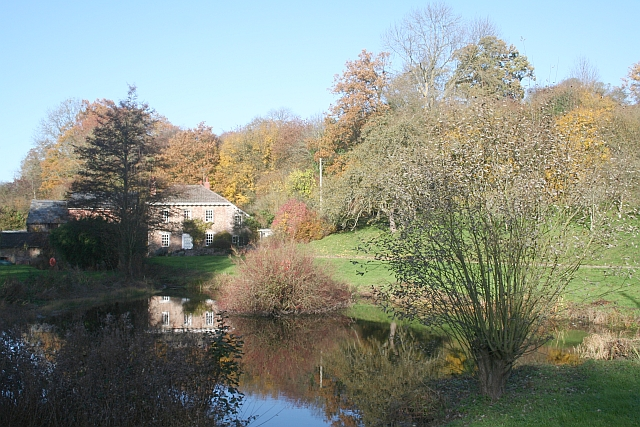
- Risbury Mill with Risbury iron age hill fort of Risbury Camp among the trees behind

- Location within Herefordshire
- OS grid reference: SO548550
- Unitary authority: Herefordshire
- Ceremonial county: Herefordshire
- Region: West Midlands
- Country: England
- Sovereign state: United Kingdom
- Post town: Leominster
- Postcode district: HR6
- Dialling code: 01568
- Police: West Mercia
- Fire: Hereford and Worcester
- Ambulance: West Midlands
- UK Parliament: North Herefordshire

Risbury is a village in the civil parish of Humber in Herefordshire, England, and 4 miles (6 km) south-east of Leominster.

There used to be a Methodist chapel, a post office and The Hop Pole public house in the village, but all three are now residential dwellings. At Risbury cross there is a bus shelter, however the accompanying red phone box was decommissioned in 2018 and moved to the village hall opposite to house a defibrillator.

Risbury Camp, an Iron Age hill fort, is just outside the village on private farmland, although a public footpath runs nearby. There is a green burial ground, Humber Woodland of Remembrance, outside within the parish.
