= Much Cowarne =

Village in Herefordshire, England

Coordinates: 52.12°N 02.55°W

- Location within Herefordshire
- Population: 463 (2011)
- OS grid reference: SO 621 472
- Shire county: Herefordshire
- Region: West Midlands
- Country: England
- Sovereign state: United Kingdom
- Post town: BROMYARD
- Postcode district: HR7
- Dialling code: 01531
- Police: West Mercia
- Fire: Hereford and Worcester
- Ambulance: West Midlands
- UK Parliament: North Herefordshire

Much Cowarne is a village and civil parish in the English county of Herefordshire, located off the A417 about 16 miles from Hereford and 10 miles from its post town of Bromyard.

== Geography ==
The village is located in countryside away from main roads, with views to the Malvern Hills and Wye Valley. Composer Edward Elgar considered the landscape around the village as a source of inspiration, frequently cycling in the area to visit the church or friends at Cowarne Court. The civil parish includes the hamlet of Hope's Rough.

== History ==
The Domesday Book form of the name, Cuure, suggests a meaning cow house, perhaps implying a significant dairying centre. Little Cowarne, to the north west, appears in Domesday as Colgre which seems a quite different name, perhaps charcoal wood. The two manors became linked, probably wrongly, in a 12th-century exchequer manuscript, and have shared a name ever since. It has recently been suggested that Much Cowarne, like its neighbours Bromyard and Ledbury, was an Anglo-Saxon minster, though not as long lasting as they, and also a royal tun, the administrative centre of an area stretching from Bishop's Frome to Mordiford and Tarrington. In Domesday Book there are 41 households, a large number, in "Cuure". The Lord in 1066 was Earl Harold, to whom it was worth £25. The Lord in 1086 was Agnes daughter of Alfred of Marlborough, to whom it was worth £20. There was a priest, and 2 lord's plough teams and 32 men's plough teams. In 1148 Bishop Gilbert Foliot appropriated the revenues of the church to Gloucester Abbey for candles and ornaments. This was confirmed by Bishops Hugh Foliot and John le Breton. In the 1291 Taxation, the church was valued at £23 6s. 8d. The connection with Gloucester may go back to Bernard de Neufmarché in 1088 On 15 May 1255 Richard Pauncefot was granted a market on Thursdays and an annual fair at Much Cowarne by King Henry III, to be held at the manor. Similar markets and fairs were granted to Grimbald Pauncefot by Edward I on 16 November 1281. A large medieval settlement south east of Mill House has been scheduled as an important archaeological site.

== Notable buildings ==
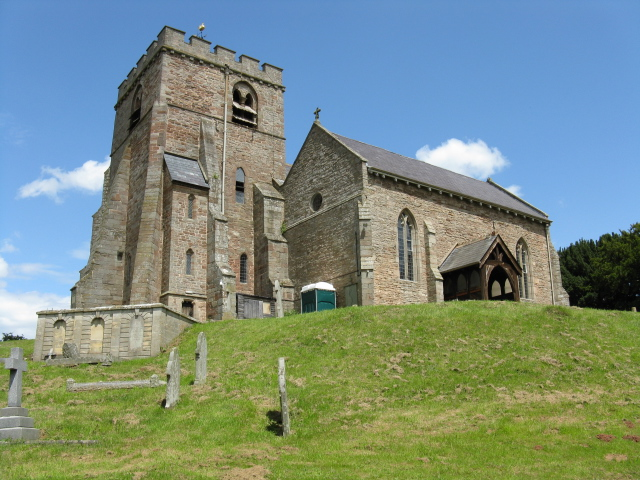
Church of St Mary the Virgin

Cowarne Hall is a former school building built in a Victorian Gothic architectural style, which has now been converted into a village hall and holiday cottages.

The village has a medieval church building, dedicated to St Mary the Virgin, which dates to the thirteenth and fourteenth centuries. There is a plaque inside the church celebrating Edward Elgar's connection to the village. The church is a grade I listed building

== Community ==
The Much Cowarne History Group has published several books and booklets, including A Jugful of Much Cowarne Cider (2003) and Much Cowarne Church: A Guidebook and History (2008). It is currently involved in producing a collection of stories and pictures about the village as part of a Local Heritage Initiative project.

== Local produce ==
The village has its own apple variety known as the Much Cowarne Red.
