= Burley Gate =

Coordinates: 52°7′21″N 2°35′19″W

- Hamlet
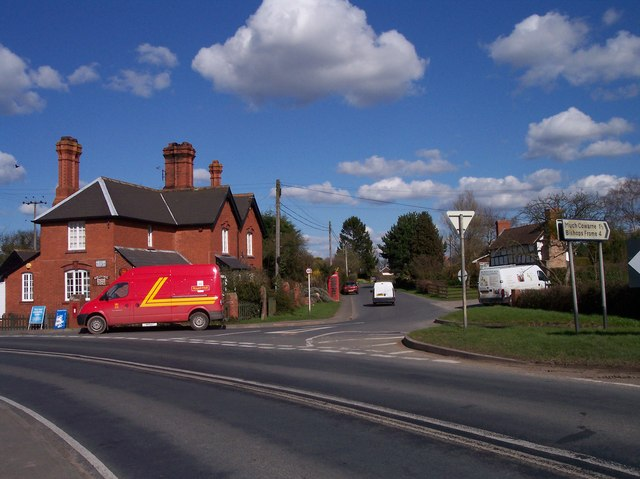

- Location within the United Kingdom
- Post town: Hereford
- Postcode district: HR1
- Dialling code: 01432
- Police
- Fire
- Ambulance
- UK Parliament: North Herefordshire

Burley Gate is a hamlet in Herefordshire, England. It is north-east from the junction between the A465 road and the A417 road. The hamlet is divided between two civil parishes: Much Cowarne in the east, and Ocle Pychard in the west, with the parish of Moreton Jeffries abutted at the north.

A primary school is in the western part of Burley Gate, and a Tudor house is at the centre.

Burley Gate Village Hall serves as the vibrant social heart of our community, welcoming residents from across the local parishes. Originally built as a local school, the building was converted in 1977 and fully refurbished in 2022 to provide a versatile, modern, and accessible space for all generations.
