= Anne Camm =

English Quaker

- Born: August 1627; Kendal, Cumbria, England
- Died: 30 September 1705 (aged 78)
- Spouse(s): John Audland (m. ?; died 1664); Thomas Camm (m. 1666)

Anne Camm (née Newby; August 1627 – 30 September 1705) was an early English Quaker preacher.

== Life ==
=== Origins ===
Anne Newby was born in Kendal in 1627 and baptised in the parish church shortly after. In her youth, she lived with her aunt in London for seven years. She became deeply pious during this time, caught up in the religious radicalism of the city during the Civil War.

=== First marriage ===
Anne married John Audland and they were both preachers for the Quaker cause from their conversion in 1652, after George Fox's missionary journey around Westmorland. Anne travelled throughout Yorkshire, Oxfordshire, Leicestershire and Derbyshire preaching Fox's ideas. In 1653 she was put on trial for her blasphemy but argued that this was incorrect, publishing her views in A True Declaration of the Suffering of the Innocent, two years later. Anne travelled without her husband so that she could avoid the distraction of pregnancies that might interfere with her work.

=== Second marriage ===
In 1664 she gave birth to a son a fortnight after the death of her first husband. After this she married Thomas Camm despite being over a decade older than him. They had two daughters and Anne supported her husband in his preaching rather than preaching herself. She had to run the household whilst he was imprisoned for his beliefs. Anne's reduction in her preaching is thought to mirror the changing role of women within the Quakers. Frequently quiet, Anne reacted when she heard of opposition to Quaker women having meetings and the women Quakers in Kendal wrote letters in protest to the views of John Wilkinson and John Story.

=== Death ===
She died in 1705.
