= Pencombe =

Village in Herefordshire, England

Coordinates: 52.171°N 2.587°W

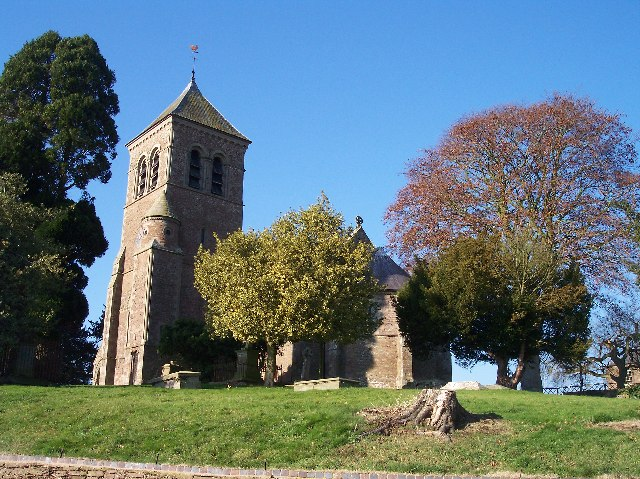
- The Church of St John

- Location within Herefordshire
- Population: 336
- Civil parish: Pencombe with Grendon Warren
- Unitary authority: Herefordshire
- Shire county: Herefordshire
- Region: West Midlands
- Country: England
- Sovereign state: United Kingdom
- Post town: Bromyard
- Postcode district: HR7
- Police: West Mercia
- Fire: Hereford and Worcester
- Ambulance: West Midlands
- UK Parliament: North Herefordshire

Pencombe is a village and former civil parish, now in the parish of Pencombe with Grendon Warren, in Herefordshire, England. The village is 3.5 miles (6 km) south-west of Bromyard (the local market town with schools and a hospital) and about 10 miles (16 km) north-east of Hereford, in each case reached by minor roads.

A parish hall caters for community events and there are part time post office services provided every Tuesday (midday - 1pm) by a mobile unit. The village public house is the Wheelwright Arms. Parish population in 2017 was estimated to be 336.

St John's Church is constructed in the Norman style of soft local red sandstone, and replaces a medieval building on the same site. In 2009 a female parish priest was appointed. Across the road is the former parish hall, opened in the 1890s, now a private dwelling. Other village buildings include Pencombe Court and Pencombe Church of England Primary School, both adjacent to the church. Pencombe Hall, a private residential care home to the south of the village, with coach house, now a private dwelling, were built by John Hungerford Arkwright, of Hampton Court 6 miles (10 km) to the east, a descendant of Richard Arkwright.

Pencombe has a village cricket team, with no home ground, which plays Sunday friendly away games.

Trade directory extract for Pencombe from 1863:

Pencombe is a parish and village, 4 miles (6.4 km) west from Bromyard (its post town), 6 west from Dinmore Railway Station, and 11 from Hereford, in Broxash hundred, Bromyard union and county court district, Frome deanery, and Hereford archdeaconry and bishopric. The church is a very ancient and remarkable building in the Norman style; the tower (of stone) was rebuilt in 1840, and contains 3 bells; it has nave, a chancel, apse, porch, an ancient font, and three modern tablets. The register dates from 1565. The living is a rectory, worth £490 yearly, with residence and 119 acres (0.48 km^{2}) of glebe land, in the gift of John H. Arkwright, Esq., and held by the Rev. George Arkwright, M.A., of Oriel College, Oxford. There is a Sunday and Day school for boys and girls, supported by the rector. The Rectory House is very pleasantly situated, half a mile from the church. The population in 1861 was 415; the acreage is 3,955. The soil is clayey; the subsoil partly stone. John H. Arkwright, Esq., is lord of the manor and chief landowner. The chief crops are wheat, beans, oats, and clover. A court leet is held at the Court-house once in three years; and by an ancient custom the lord of the manor claims a pair of gilt spurs when a mayor of Hereford dies while in office.

— Post Office Directory of Herefordshire 1863, volunteer transcribed to Genuki

The New Zealand zoologist Charles Chilton was born in Pencombe in 1860.

In 1891 the parish had a population of 268. On 30 September 1895 the parish was abolished and merged with Grendon Warren to form "Pencombe with Grendon Warren".
