= Ullingswick =

Village in Herefordshire, England

Coordinates: 52°08′26″N 2°36′15″W

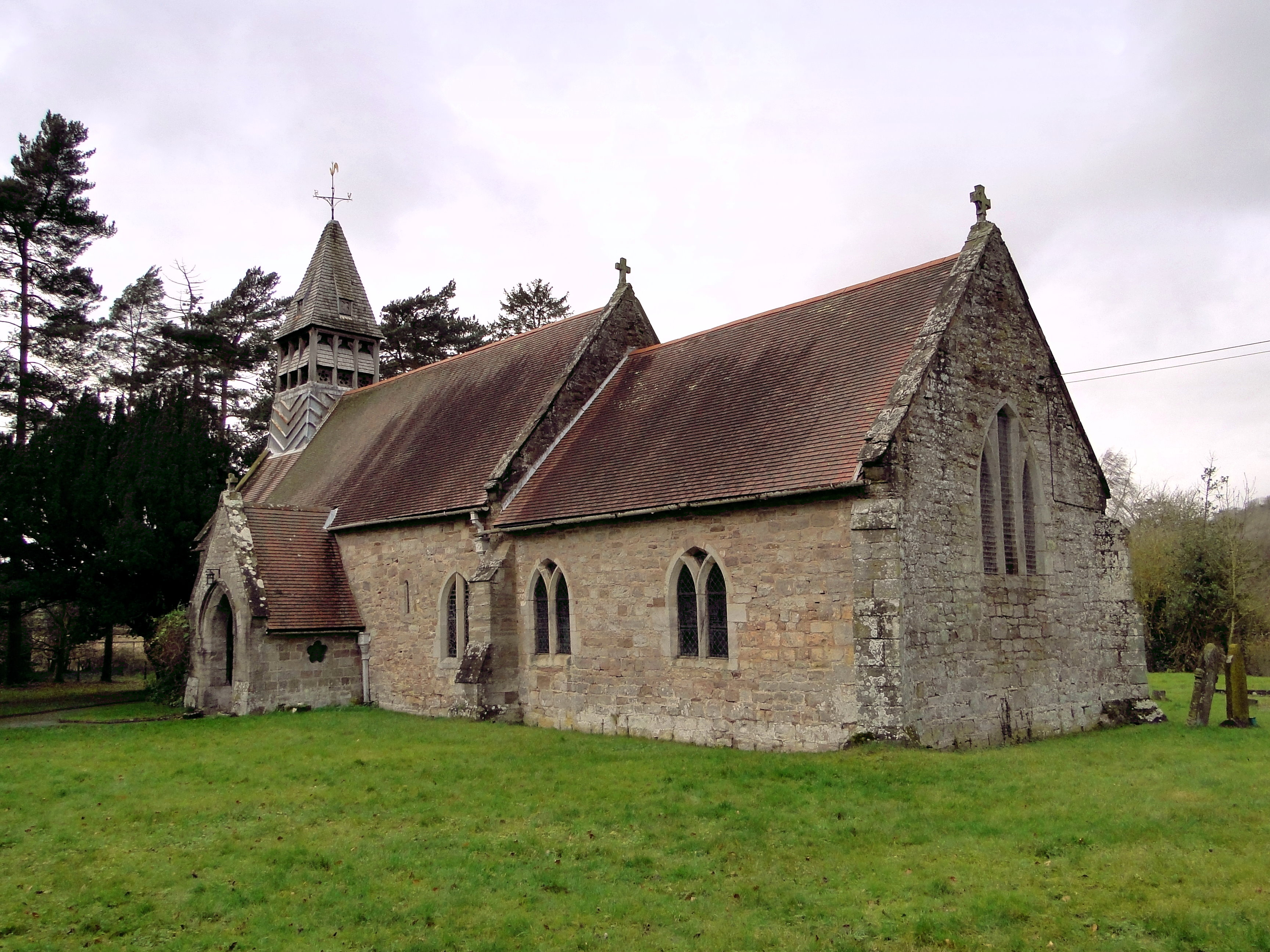
- St Luke's Church

- Location within Herefordshire
- Population: 259 (2011 Census)
- Unitary authority: Herefordshire
- Shire county: Herefordshire
- Region: West Midlands
- Country: England
- Sovereign state: United Kingdom
- Post town: Hereford
- Postcode district: HR1
- Police: West Mercia
- Fire: Hereford and Worcester
- Ambulance: West Midlands
- UK Parliament: North Herefordshire

Ullingswick is a small village in Herefordshire, England located about 6 miles (9.7 km) south west of Bromyard, 9 miles (14 km) north east of Hereford and 10 miles south east of Leominster. The population of the village at the 2011 census was 259.

== Archaeology ==
According to local archeological studies, there is possible evidence of earthworks resulting from an early timber castle, to the north of the former village hall (which no longer exists and has been built over) (grid reference SO58514932). This was recorded as "Dunder Camp" on the 1904 Ordnance Survey map. Further details can be found in Archaeological Research Section Herefordshire Archaeological News Vol.63 p. 56.

== History ==
It is mentioned in the Domesday Book of 1086 as Ullingwic. The name may derive from "Ulla ingas wic", where Ulla was the name of an Anglo-Saxon chief, ingas is Anglo-Saxon for "followers of", and wic, wick or wich is an Anglo-Saxon word meaning abode or dwelling place, borrowed from the Latin vicus meaning village. Thus meaning "the dwelling of the followers of Ulla".

Other records of the name include

- 1086 Ullingwic, Dom.
- 1127 Olingewiche, A.C.
- 1186 Ullyngwyk, Glos. Cart.
- 1192 Ullingewike, Glos. Cart.
- no date Wylyngwyche, Willingswyke, Glos. Cart.
- 1276 Ullingwike, Ep. Reg.
- 1291 Ullingwyke, Tax. Eccles.
- 1341 Ullongewyk, Non. Inq.

With the same source citing the meaning of the name as "Wic of the sons of Willa".

The village church, St Luke's, has a Norman nave, 13th century chancel, and Victorian porch and bell tower. It is built in a Gothic style, but was extensively restored in 1863 at a cost of £800 and reroofed in 1912. A lych gate was erected in 1921 at the west entrance to the churchyard, as a War Memorial. The font stem dates from the 13th Century, and font bowl from the 15th Century. Of note is a 16th Century memorial painting on the south wall, to John Hill (d.1590), owner of the nearby Lower Court. The inscription reads, ""Here lyeth the body of John Hill gentleman heire to John Hill gent of the Nether courts who marryed the eldest daughter one of the co-heires of Hugh Brooke esquyer of Lounge Ashton (Long Ashton) in ye county of Somerset: lyneally descendinge from the house of ye Lord Cobham & had by her three sonns & two daughters: these armes came by hir and hee departed this lyffe the thirde daye of February in the XXXXlll yere of the raigne of oure soveraigne lady Quene Elizabeth Anno Domi 1590 upon whom the Lorde hathe mercy". The monument painted on stone shows John lying on top of a tomb chest between kneeling figures labelled (from left to right): "Francis thir yovnger", "John thir eldest sonne", "Elisabethe his wife" and "Jane thir daughter". On the floor are two shrouded infants labelled John and Jane. Elizabeth was one of four co-heiress daughters of Hugh Brooke (d.1588), grand daughter of Thomas Brooke (d.1537) and Joan (d.1538) daughter of Sir John Speke of Whitelackington

In 1862, the village was the scene of the rape and murder of 16-year old Mary Corbett, on an errand to buy candles on a stormy October evening. The murderer, William Hope, a labourer and known criminal from the village was convicted and hanged in Hereford, on 15 April 1863, the first hanging there for thirty years. Other notable crimes in Ullingswick from the Victorian era included an offence under the Turnpike Act in 1854, a bolting horse in 1867, an attempted suicide in 1899 and the death of a drunkard in 1901.

== Today ==
The village economy is almost exclusively agricultural. The village school and village post office no longer exist. The public house in the village was the Three Crowns Inn. now closed.

The local primary school is at Burley Gate and the local secondary school is the Queen Elizabeth High School in Bromyard.

== In media ==
Ullingswick is the setting of two books by Ross Heaven, The Sin Eater's Last Confessions and Walking With The Sin Eater: A Celtic Pilgrimage On The Dragon Path.
