= James Nayler =

English Quaker leader (1618–1660)

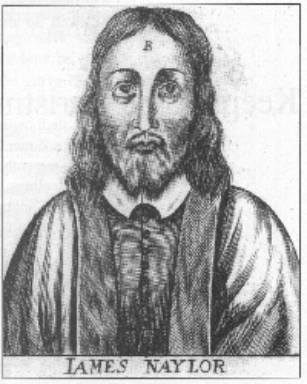
James Nayler, with a "B" (blasphemer) branded on his forehead

James Nayler (or Naylor; 1618–1660) was an English Quaker leader. He was among the members of the Valiant Sixty, a group of early Quaker preachers and missionaries. In 1656, Nayler achieved national notoriety when he re-enacted Christ's Palm Sunday entry into Jerusalem by entering Bristol on a horse. He was imprisoned and charged with blasphemy.

== Early life ==
Nayler was born in the town of Ardsley in Yorkshire. In 1642 he joined the Parliamentarian army, and served as quartermaster under John Lambert until 1650.

== Religious experience ==
After experiencing what he took to be the Voice of God calling him from work in his fields, Nayler gave up his possessions and began seeking a spiritual direction, which he found in Quakerism after meeting the leader of the movement, George Fox, in 1652. Nayler became the most prominent of the travelling Quaker evangelists known as the Valiant Sixty. He drew many converts and was considered a skilled theological debater.

== Rift with Fox ==
=== Fox's concerns over the acts of Nayler's followers ===
Beginning in 1656, Fox expressed concerns to Nayler that both Nayler's ministry and that of his associate Martha Simmonds were becoming over-enthusiastic and erratic. Fox's concerns apparently centred specifically on Nayler allowing a group of his followers to see in Nayler himself in some sense a great prophet or even a messiah figure. On 21 and 22 September 1656, Fox visited Nayler twice in prison at Exeter and admonished him. Over the visits, Nayler continued to reject Fox's words. Prominent Quaker author Rufus M. Jones provides a description of the strained encounter:

[Fox] showed [Nayler] how dangerous was the path of pride and how awful it was to turn light into darkness, but the frank, well-meant words of warning fell on deaf ears. Nayler tried to make a show of love and would have kissed Fox, but the latter would receive no sham kisses from one whose spirit was plainly wrong. "James," he said, "it will be harder for thee to get down thy rude company [of followers] than it was for thee to set them up."

=== Bristol Palm Sunday Re-enactment and sentencing for blasphemy ===
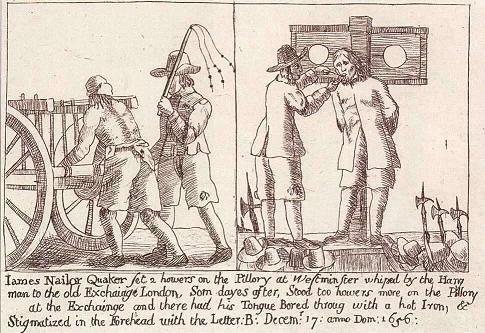
James Nayler in pillory

In October 1656, Nayler and his friends, including Simmonds, staged a demonstration that proved disastrous: Nayler re-enacted the Palm Sunday arrival of Christ in Jerusalem.

Following Nayler's Palm Sunday Re-enactment, Nayler and some of his followers were apprehended and subsequently examined before Parliament. It was found that Nayler's followers had referred to him by such titles as "Lord", "Prince of Peace", etc., apparently believing that Nayler was in some manner representing the return of Jesus Christ. His follower Hannah Stranger refused to say if she called him "Jesus". On 16 December 1656 he was convicted of blasphemy in a highly publicised trial before the Second Protectorate Parliament. Narrowly escaping execution, he was sentenced to be put in the pillory and on there to have a red-hot iron bored through his tongue, and also to be branded with the letter B for Blasphemer on his forehead, and other public humiliations. Subsequently he was imprisoned for two years of hard labour.

The Nayler case was part of a broader political attack against the Quakers. Initially, it was discussed under the Blasphemy Ordinance of 1648 with the hope of imposing an authoritative Presbyterian religious settlement on the Commonwealth – the Presbyterians had also attempted to use the Ordinance against John Biddle in the previous parliament. Ultimately the prosecution did not rely on any statute. Many of the speeches in the debates about Nayler centred on Biblical tradition on heresy (including calling for the death penalty) and generally urged MPs to quash vice and heresy. After the verdict, Cromwell rejected representations on behalf of Nayler, but at the same time wanted to make sure the case did not provide a precedent for action against the people of God.

To modern eyes, Nayler's Palm Sunday Re-enactment might not seem particularly outrageous, especially when compared with other acts of some of the other early Quaker activists, who would occasionally disrupt church services, or sometimes go out disrobed in public, being "naked as a sign", and as a supposed symbol of spiritual innocence. At the time, Quakers were already being pressed to denounce the doctrine of the Inner Light for its implication of equality with Christ, and Nayler's ambiguous symbolism was seen as playing with fire. The Society's subsequent move, mostly driven by Fox, toward a somewhat more organised structure, with Meetings given the ability to disavow a member, seemed to have been moved by a desire to avoid similar problems.

=== Aftermath ===
George Fox was horrified by the Bristol event, recounting in his Journal that "James ran out into imaginations, and a company with him; and they raised up a great darkness in the nation," despite Nayler's belief that his actions were consistent with Quaker theology, and despite Fox's own having occasionally acted in certain ways as if he himself might have been somehow similar to the Biblical prophets. Yet Fox and the movement in general denounced Nayler publicly, though this did not stop anti-Quakers from using the incident to paint Quakers as heretics or equate them with Ranters.

=== Reconciliation with Fox ===
Nayler left prison in 1659 a physically ruined man. He soon went to pay a visit to George Fox, before whom he then knelt and asked for forgiveness, repenting of his earlier actions. Afterwards he was formally, if still reluctantly, forgiven by Fox.

== Final year, writings and death ==
Having been accepted again by Fox, Nayler joined other Quaker critics of the Cromwellian regime, condemning the nation's rulers. In October 1660, while travelling to rejoin his family in Yorkshire, he was robbed and left near death in a field, then brought to the home of a Quaker doctor in Kings Ripton, Huntingdonshire. A day later and two hours before he died on 21 October, aged 42, he made a moving statement which many Quakers since have come to value:

There is a spirit which I feel that delights to do no evil, nor to revenge any wrong, but delights to endure all things, in hope to enjoy its own in the end. Its hope is to outlive all wrath and contention, and to weary out all exaltation and cruelty, or whatever is of a nature contrary to itself. It sees to the end of all temptations. As it bears no evil in itself, so it conceives none in thoughts to any other. If it be betrayed, it bears it, for its ground and spring is the mercies and forgiveness of God. Its crown is meekness, its life is everlasting love unfeigned; it takes its kingdom with entreaty and not with contention, and keeps it by lowliness of mind. In God alone it can rejoice, though none else regard it, or can own its life. It is conceived in sorrow, and brought forth without any to pity it, nor doth it murmur at grief and oppression. It never rejoiceth but through sufferings; for with the world's joy it is murdered. I found it alone, being forsaken. I have fellowship therein with them who lived in dens and desolate places in the earth, who through death obtained this resurrection and eternal holy life.

James Nayler was buried on 21 October 1660 in Thomas Parnell's burial ground at Kings Ripton. According to the village website, "There is also a Quaker's Burial ground to the rear of 'Quakers Rest' on Ramsey Road."

== Publications ==
- The Works of James Nayler, by Quaker Heritage Press, a complete edition of Nayler's works including letters previously available in manuscripts. The editor modernizing the spelling, punctuation, etc. noting significant textual variants without changing the original wording. The set is available in book form or in an unabridged on-line edition. (2009).
- There Is A Spirit: The Nayler Sonnets is a collection, first published in 1945, of 26 poems by Kenneth Boulding, each inspired by a four- to sixteen-word portion of Nayler's dying statement (and also includes the intact statement). Boulding gave permission for the publication of his The Nayler Sonnets to Irene Pickard who printed them in 1944 in the periodical she was editing from New York City, "Inward Light". The "There is a spirit ..." statement forms section 19.12 of Britain Yearly Meeting's anthology Quaker Faith and Practice. The Swarthmore Lecture has the title Ground and Spring, taken from Nayler's "There is a spirit ..." statement. (2007).
- The Sorrows of the Quaker Jesus: James Nayler and the Puritan Crackdown on the Free Spirit. (1996).
- Refutation of some of the more Modern Misrepresentations of the Society of Friends commonly called Quakers, with a Life of James Nayler, by Joseph Gurney Bevan. (1800).
- Memoir of the Life, Ministry, Trial, and Sufferings of James Nayler. (1719).
- Tracts of Nayler entitled A Collection of Sundry Books, Epistles, and Papers Written by James Nayler, Some of Which Were Never Before Printed: with an Impartial Relation of the Most Remarkable Transactions Relating to His Life (1716) edited by his friend (and important early Quaker) George Whitehead, though Whitehead omitted Nayler's more controversial works and freely edited and changed the text. Note that this volume appeared after the death of George Fox, who opposed the re-issuing of ANY of Nayler's writings. Fox, however, did appropriate and issue with only cosmetic changes as "Epistle 47" a 1653 letter written by Nayler as his own in the 1698 edition of Fox's epistles.
- A Relation of the Life, Conversion, Examination, Confession, and Sentence of James Nayler. (1657).

== See also ==
- Leo Damrosch, The Sorrows of the Quaker Jesus; ISBN 0-674-82143-2
