= Linton (near Bromyard) =

Civil parish in Herefordshire, England

Coordinates: 52.1840°N 2.45922°W

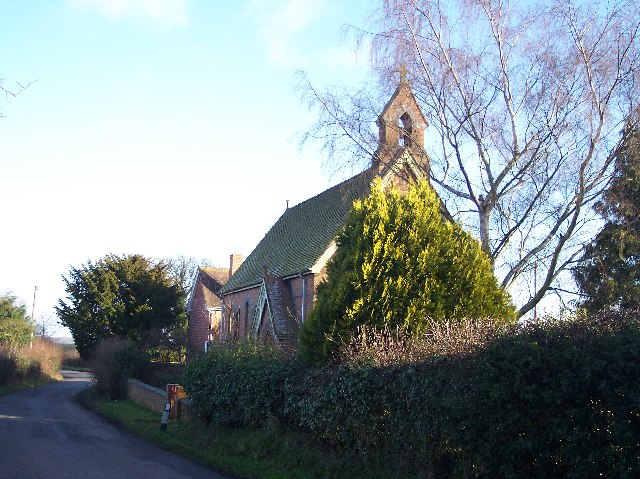
- Chapel at Linley Green, Linton

- Location within Herefordshire
- Population: 385 (2011 Census)
- OS grid reference: SO687540
  - London: 110 mi (180 km) SE
- Unitary authority: Herefordshire
- Ceremonial county: Herefordshire
- Region: West Midlands
- Country: England
- Sovereign state: United Kingdom
- Post town: Worcester
- Postcode district: WR6
- Dialling code: 01568
- Police: West Mercia
- Fire: Hereford and Worcester
- Ambulance: West Midlands
- UK Parliament: North Herefordshire

Linton is a civil parish in north-east of Herefordshire, England, and is approximately 14 miles (23 km) north-east from the city of Hereford. The closest town is Bromyard, conjoined to the parish at the west. The parish includes the public open land of Bringsty Common at its north-east, and the hamlet of Linley Green.

== History ==
According to A Dictionary of British Place Names, Linton derives from 'a farmstead where flax is grown', from the Old English līn with tūn.

In the Domesday Book, Avenbury, at the west of the parish, is the only settlement listed which includes part of today's Linton. The manor was within the Plegelgete Hundred. It was one of the lands of Nigel the Doctor (a clerk, probably one of William I's physicians), with 22 villagers, a smallholder (middle level of serf owning about five acres of land, below and with less land than a villager), four slaves, two priests, and a mill. The area was defined by four ploughlands, worked by three lord's and 12 men's plough teams. Nigel the Doctor, who was also tenant-in-chief to king William I, had been given the land taken from the previous 1066 lord, the priest Spirtes.

Within Linton, at Burley, meaning 'woodland clearing by or belonging to a fortified place' from the Old English burh with lēah (grid reference SO668533), is the site of a 'tradition of a fortification on the high ground', first attested in 1294.

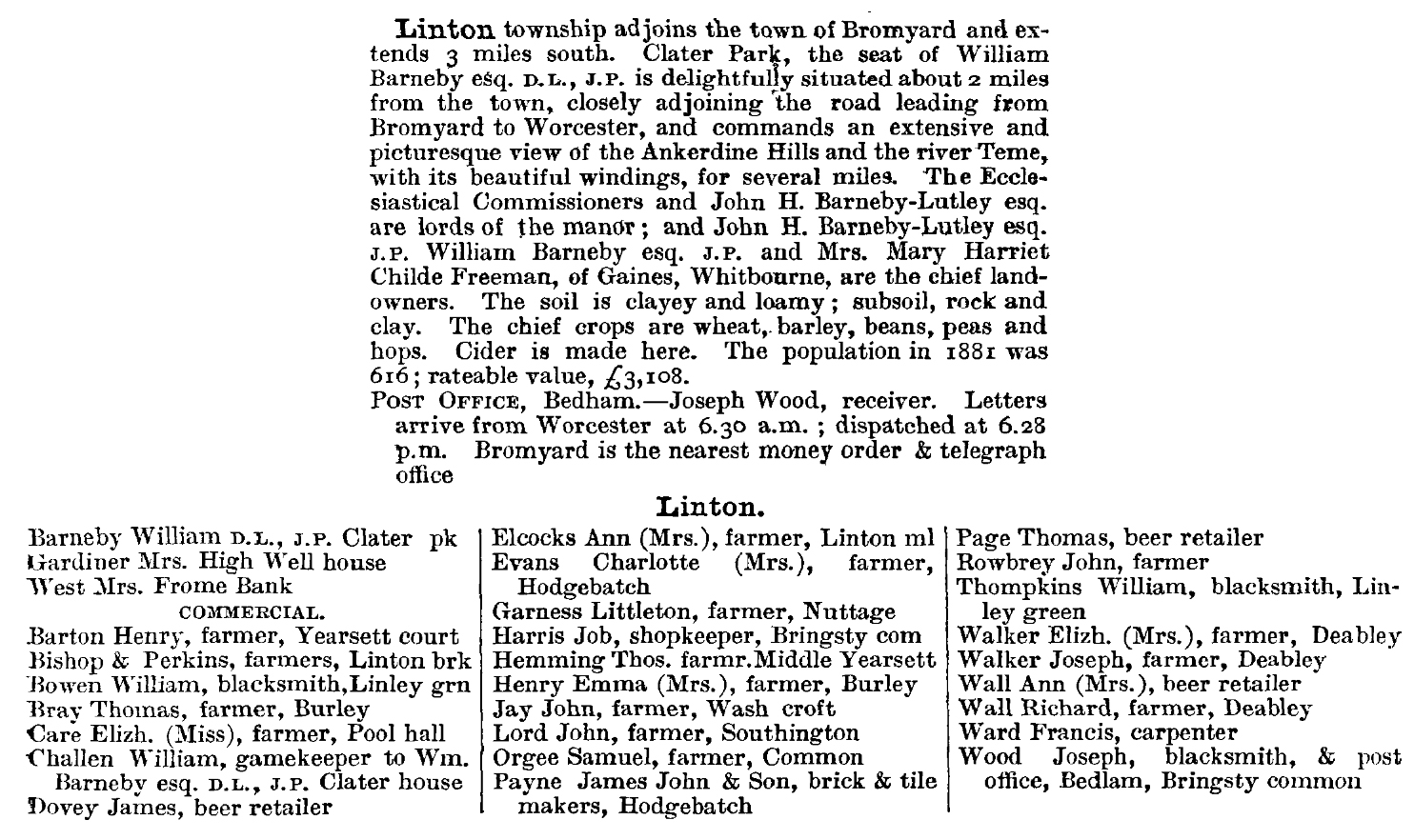
Linton in Kelly's Directory of Herefordshire, 1885

By the 19th century Linton is described as having extensive views of the 'Ankerdine hills' (Malvern Hills), and adjoined to the turnpike road from Bromyard to Worcester. There were 19 farms in 1856, three of which, Clater Park, Down House, and Pool Hall were occupied by members of the gentry. One of the farms, Burley, was a site occupied by the Romans. On 2,430 acres (980 hectares) of parish land, the soil, 'clayey and loamy', supported the growing of wheat, barley, beans, peas and hops. Population in 1851 was 587. Occupations listed included 12 farmers, three shopkeepers, one of which at Bringsty Common, a cider dealer, two blacksmiths, a wheelwright, and a surveyor of the highways.

By 1856, the owner of Clater Park, and also Saltmarshe Castle, was William Barneby (1801-57), the 1849 High Sheriff of Herefordshire, and a director of the Worcester and Leominster Railway Company. His heir, William Barneby (1846-95), in 1885 was Herefordshire's Deputy Lieutenant, a JP, and one of Linton's chief landowners, while the Ecclesiastical Commissioners were one of the two lords of the manor. Mentioned is that cider was produced, and that the 1881 population was 616. By now there were 16 farmers listed, a carpenter, three beer retailers, a brick and tile maker, a shopkeeper, a gamekeeper to William Barneby, and three blacksmiths, one of which ran a post office at Brigsty Common. Letters arrived and were forwarded to Worcester, while the nearest money order and telegraph office was at Bromyard.

In 1913 parish land was 2,330 acres (940 hectares) plus one acre of 'water' [lakes], with a 1911 population of 468, including 'eight officers and 83 inmates in the Bromyard workhouse' [within Linton at the east side of Bromyard town]. The Bringsty sub post office was now providing money orders and a telegraph service. Occupations listed included 16 farmers, one of which was also a hop grower; a house decorator; a carpenter; two beer retailers and two shopkeepers at Bringsty Common; two blacksmiths, one at Linley Green the other also running the post office; and Stream Hall Tileries Ltd (brick and tile makers).

Bromyard Union Workhouse was built in Linton in 1836 for £3,000, and housed 120 inmates. The Board of Guardians also supported vagrants in the workhouse casual ward, and a larger number of home-bound paupers. The workhouse was subjected in 1893 to an outbreak of smallpox, transmitted by tramps, following which an adjunct isolation site for infectious diseases was established to treat infected patients, this a cottage on 5 acres (2.0 hectares) of meadow, costing £260, at Burley, on which were erected six bell tents. In 1892, tramps revolted after refusing to complete a task of breaking stones; following a court appearance they were committed to 14 days hard labour. The workhouse later became Bromyard Hospital, and is today converted to residential units as Linton Court.

== Geography ==
Linton parish boundary is approximately, at its greatest distance, 2 miles (3 km) from north to south and 3.5 miles (6 km) east to west, and covers an area of 2,330 acres (943 ha). Adjacent parishes are Norton and Brockhampton at the north, Whitbourne at the north-east, Suckley (in Worcestershire) at the east, Stanford Bishop at the south, Avenbury at the south-east, and Bromyard & Winslow at the west. The parish is rural, of farms, fields, managed woodland and coppices, water courses, isolated and dispersed businesses, residential properties, the hamlet of Linley Green at the south, and the public open land of Bringsty Common at the north-east.

At the west of the parish is the River Frome which forms the western boundary with Bromyard & Winslow. From the higher ground at the centre north of the parish is Linton Brook (stream), and its tributaries, which flows south-west to the River Frome in Stanford Bishop. At Bringsty Common are two streams flowing east which converge in Whitbourne to become Sapey Brook, a tributary to the River Teme at the north-east. A further stream at the south-east flows east, becoming the parish boundary with Worcestershire, and then to Leigh Brook, another tributary to the River Teme. The only major route is the A44 Bromyard to Worcester road, which partly at the north forms the boundary with the National Trust's Brockhampton Estate. From the A44, running south to Stanford Bishop, is the B4220 Malvern road. A minor road from the B4220 runs east and forks at Linley Green: left towards Knightwick, Worcestershire, and right towards the Malvern Hills Area of Outstanding Natural Beauty. All other routes are country lanes, bridleways, farm tracks and footpaths.

== Governance ==
Linton is represented in the lowest tier of UK governance by the seven-member Brockhampton Group Parish Council, which also represents the parishes of Brockhampton and Norton. As Herefordshire is a unitary authority—no district council between parish and county councils—the parish sends councillors representing the Bromyard Bringsty Ward, to Herefordshire County Council. Linton is represented in the UK Parliament as part of the North Herefordshire constituency.

In 1974 Linton became part of the now defunct Malvern Hills District of the county of Hereford and Worcester, instituted under the Local Government Act 1972.

== Community ==
For the 2011 Census Linton recorded a population of '385 usual residents... 99.7% lived in households and 0.3% lived in communal establishments... average (mean) age of residents was 43.2 years'.

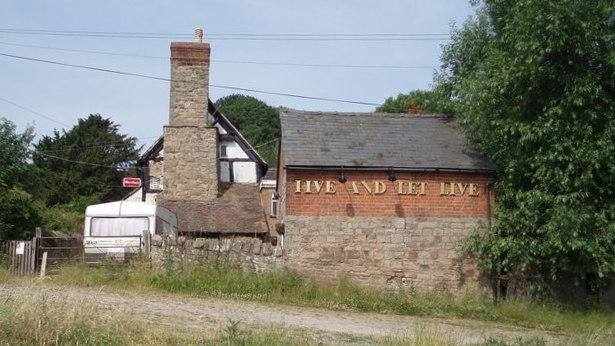
The Live and Let Live pub on Bringsty Common

A bus routes runs, with three each way parish stops, at the north on the A44, between Bromyard and Worcester. The closest rail connections are at Leominster railway station, 12 miles (19 km) to the west, Hereford 13 miles (21 km) to the south-west, both on the Crewe to Newport Welsh Marches Line, and Worcester Foregate, Worcestershire Parkway and Worcester Shrub Hill railway stations at Worcester, 10 miles (16 km) east with links on the Cotswold, Cross Country and West Midlands Trains lines.

The nearest hospitals are Bromyard community hospital, just outside the parish border in Bromyard, with the nearest major hospital, Hereford County Hospital, 13 miles south-west at Hereford, both part of the Wye Valley NHS Trust, and the Worcestershire Royal Hospital to the east.

The nearest primary schools are Brockhampton Primary School, the closest, on Bromyard Downs (road) at Brockhampton, and St. Peter's Primary School at Bromyard; the nearest secondary is Queen Elizabeth High School at Bromyard. In latest Ofsted inspections Brockhampton Primary was rated Grade 2 'Good' (2017); St. Peter's Grade 2 'Good' (2018); and Queen Elizabeth High School Grade 2 'Good' (2017).

At Bringsty Common is The Live & Let Live public house, also a catering equipment hire company. On the B4220 is an off-road motorcycle race and practice track. To the east of the motorcycle track is a campsite at Linton Mill. Farther north-east, on the A44, is a Caravan and Motorhome Club campsite. Farther west on the A44 is Linton Trading Estate that includes a vintage car company, a café, a motor services company, a farm equipment supplier, self storage units, a scrap metal dealer, and a Herefordshire Council household waste recycling centre. There are two private guest houses, one off the A44 at Malvern Turn (road), the other at Linley Green.

For religion, Linton falls under the Deanery of Bromyard in the Diocese of Hereford, although no church or parish church exists within the civil parish. The nearest parish churches are St Peter's at Bromyard, and St James' at Stanford Bishop village to the south which is part of the eight-church Frome Valley Churches' ministry.

== Landmarks ==
Within Linton are 24 Grade II listed buildings, including farmhouses, cottages and barns.

The Old Post Office (Bringsty Post Office) on the A44 next to Bringsty Common (grid reference SO693547), owned by the National Trust, and dating in parts to the 16th and 17th century, is timber-framed with infill brick noging, of two storeys with three gables, casement windows, and a number of original doors. Clater Park, significant as a gentry house in the 19th century and earlier, is south off the A44 (grid reference SO684543), and a three-storey ashlar fronted, 18th-century house of three bays, with a central door and porch with Tuscan columns, pilasters and cornice. It has a slate hipped roof, and sash windows. The house sits on a raised earth plinth terrace in a landscaped park which includes a gate lodge, a lake and a kitchen garden. The property has a 2021 valuation between £1,546,000 and £2,118,171.

There are sites of two possible deserted medieval villages. The first is at Linton Brook Farm c,1066 on the B4220 Malvern road (grid reference SO6853), evidenced by terracing and linear earthworks; the second south from Clater Park (house) c.1066, south from the A44 (grid reference SO6854), showing signs of holloways, house platforms, ditches, and a pillow mound.

Further medieval sites are ridge and furrows (grid reference SO68305375 and (grid reference SO68105345), and five more medieval settlements, these the Linton early township, (grid reference SO680535), a fortification on the high ground to the south-east of Burley (grid reference SO668533), one c.1540 at Hodgebatch Manor Farm north from the A44 at the north-west of the parish (grid reference SO6624754317), a medieval settlement and post-medieval c.1540 farm settlement at Ashminton, north from Linton Mill (grid reference SO 67540 53160), and a farm settlement centred on Southington House, at the extreme south of the parish off the B4220 (grid reference SO6836653041).

The parish contains the 220 acres (89 hectares) of common land of Bringsty Common (grid reference SO700548) at the north-east, shared, and managed between Linton and the adjacent parish of Whitbourne. The common has been designated a Special Wildlife Site by Herefordshire Nature Trust.

The Bromyard and Linton Light Railway, privately built and of charity status, is a 2 ft (610 mm) narrow gauge line, laid on the bed of the former BR Worcester, Bromyard and Leominster Railway line. The 1 mile (1.6 km) line runs from the site of the old Bromyard station (grid reference SO658547), now a trading estate, to the A44 near Linton Court (grid reference SO668541). The 25 miles (40 km) track bed of the railway continues toward the south of Linton, then partly through Stanford Bishop, returning to Linton, and continuing east to Bransford near Worcester, and is a footpath, when not broken, in parts private, accessible or permissive.

To the north, adjacent to the parish is the National Trust property Brockhampton Estate, which includes Lower Brockhampton, a 14th-century timber framed manor house.
