= Stanford Bishop =

Village in Herefordshire, England

Coordinates: 52.165371°N 2.4550043°W

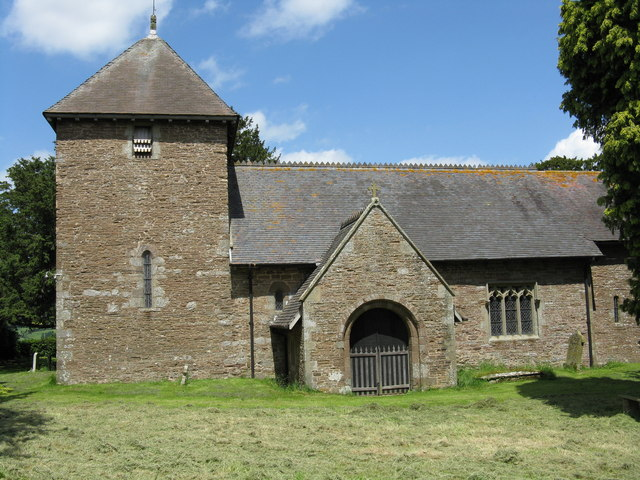

- Location within Herefordshire
- Area: 6.128 km^{2} (2.366 sq mi)
- Population: 113 (2011 census)
  - Density: 18/km^{2} (47/sq mi)
- Civil parish: Stanford Bishop
- Unitary authority: County of Herefordshire
- Shire county: Herefordshire
- Region: West Midlands
- Country: England
- Sovereign state: United Kingdom
- Police: West Mercia
- Fire: Hereford and Worcester
- Ambulance: West Midlands

Stanford Bishop is a village and civil parish 13 miles (21 km) north east of Hereford, in the county of Herefordshire, England. In 2011 the parish had a population of 113. The parish touches Acton Beauchamp, Avenbury, Bishop's Frome, Linton and Suckley. Stanford Bishop shares a parish council with Acton Beauchamp and Evesbatch called "Acton Beauchamp Group Parish Council".

== Landmarks ==
There are 7 listed buildings in Stanford Bishop. Stanford Bishop has a church dedicated to St James and a village hall. The Church of St James is listed Grade II*.

== History ==
The name "Stanford" means 'Stone ford', the bishop part being because it was held by the Bishop of Hereford. Stanford Bishop was recorded in the Domesday Book as Stanford. On 24 March 1884 part of Bishop's Frome was transferred to the parish and Lords Meadow was transferred from Bromyard.
