= Brockhampton (near Bromyard) =

Village and civil parish in Herefordshire, England

Coordinates: 52.192°N 2.462°W

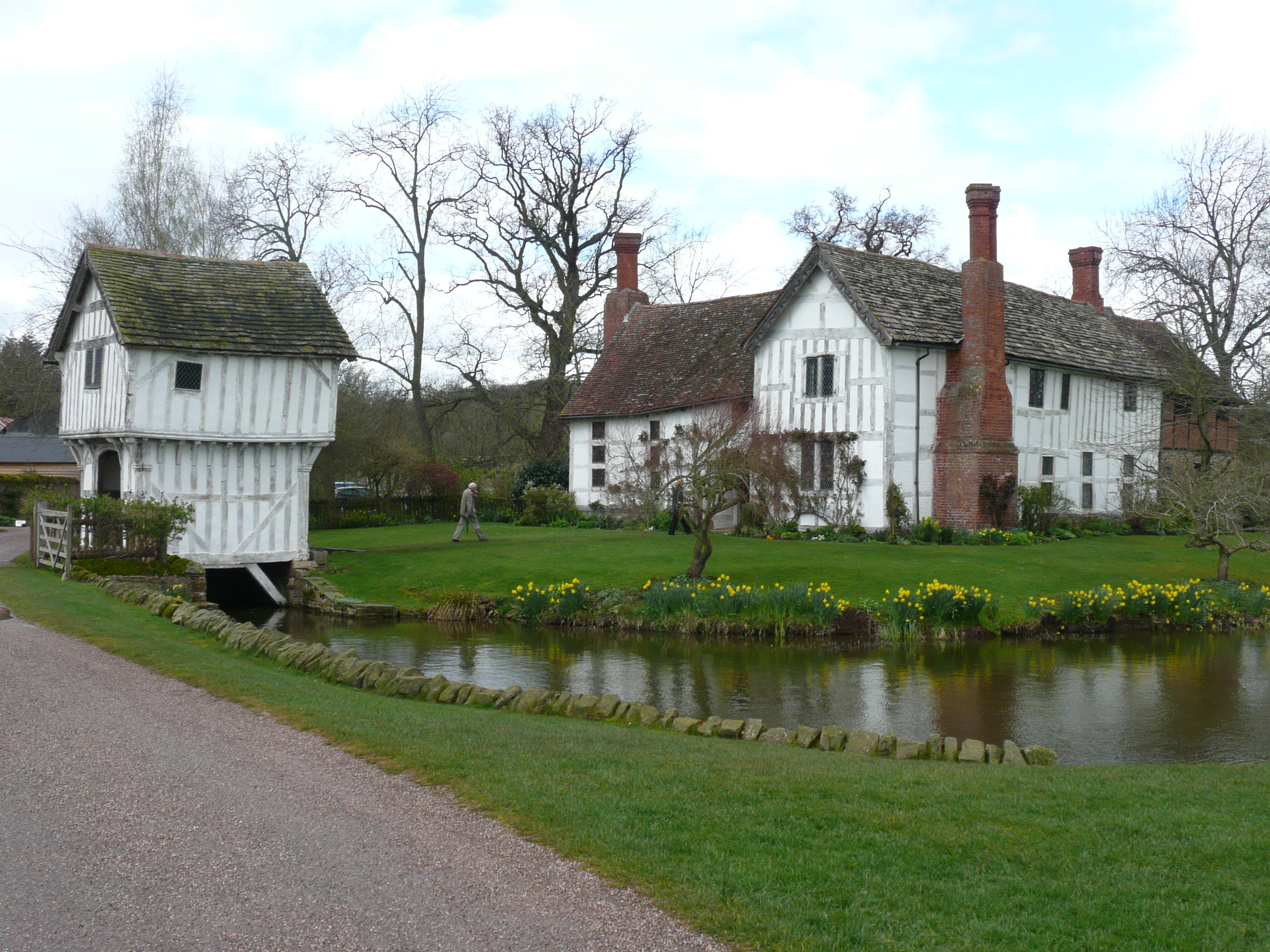
Lower Brockhampton House

Brockhampton is a civil parish in Herefordshire, England, about 4 km (2 mi) east of Bromyard. The parish comprises the National Trust property of Brockhampton Estate and Park, which includes Lower Brockhampton House

Brockhampton is represented in the lowest tier of UK governance by the seven-member Brockhampton Group Parish Council, which also represents the parishes of Linton and Norton. As Herefordshire is a unitary authority—no district council between parish and county councils—the parish sends councillors representing the Bromyard Bringsty Ward, to Herefordshire County Council.

Before 1998, the parish had been part of the Malvern Hills district of Hereford and Worcester.

According to the 2001 census, it had a population of 106.
