= Evesbatch =

Village in Herefordshire, England

Coordinates: 52.130571°N 2.4612089°W

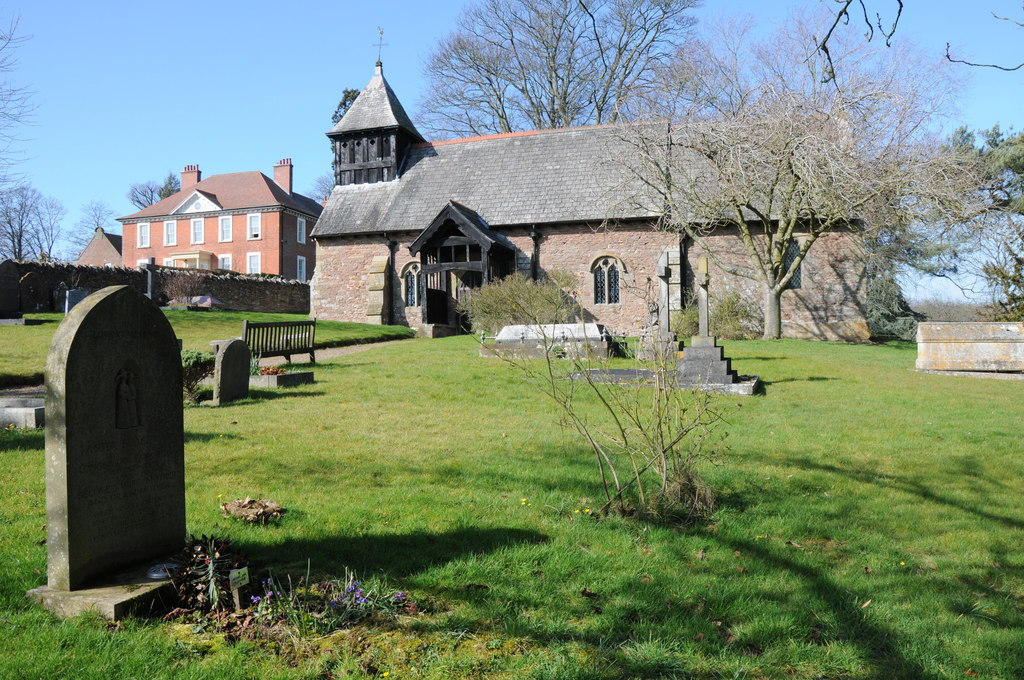

- Location within Herefordshire
- Area: 3.946 km^{2} (1.524 sq mi)
- Population: 63 (2001 census)
  - Density: 16/km^{2} (41/sq mi)
- Civil parish: Evesbatch
- Unitary authority: County of Herefordshire
- Shire county: Herefordshire
- Region: West Midlands
- Country: England
- Sovereign state: United Kingdom
- Police: West Mercia
- Fire: Hereford and Worcester
- Ambulance: West Midlands

Evesbatch is a village and civil parish 12 miles (19 km) north east of Hereford, in the county of Herefordshire, England. In 2001 the parish had a population of 63. The parish touches Acton Beauchamp, Bishop's Frome and Cradley and Storridge. Evesbatch shares a parish council with Acton Beauchamp and Stanford Bishop called "Acton Beauchamp Group Parish Council".

== Landmarks ==
There are 5 listed buildings in Evesbatch. Evesbatch has a church called St Andrew.

== History ==
The name "Evesbatch" means 'Esa's valley-stream'. Evesbatch was recorded in the Domesday Book as Sbech.
