= Bringsty Common =

- Common land
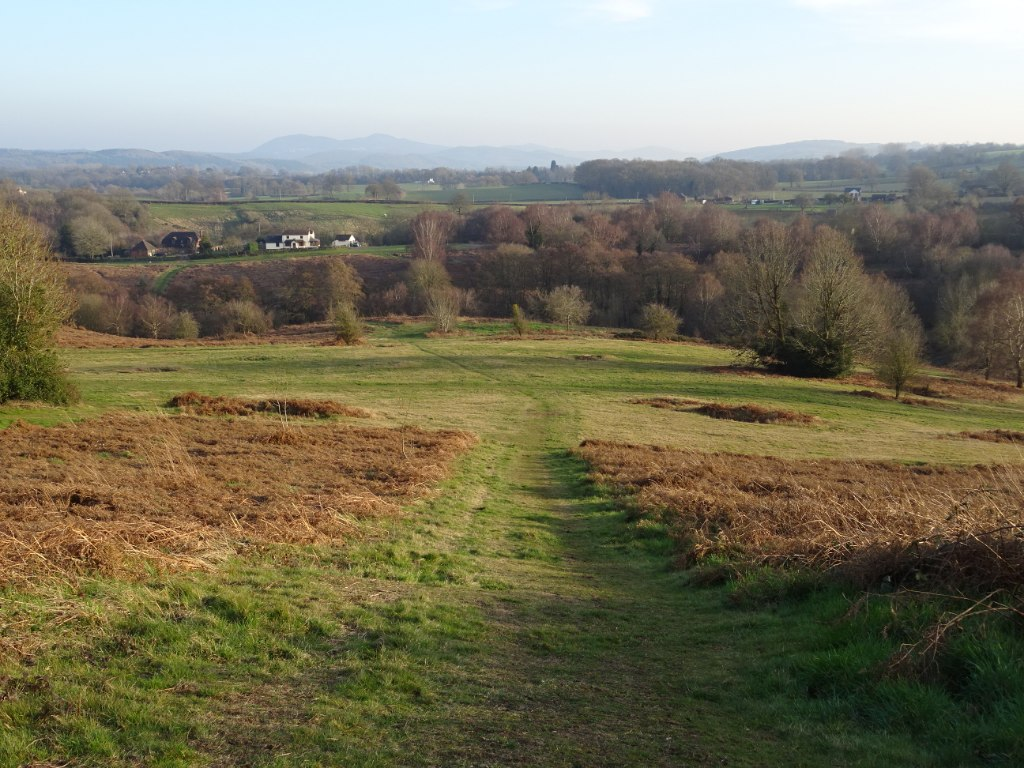
- Bringsty Common in the autumn

- Herefordshire map
- Coordinates: 52.192°N 2.440°W
- Country: United Kingdom
- Region: West Midlands
- County: Herefordshire

Bringsty Common is a scattered settlement and 220 acres (89 ha) of common land in Herefordshire, England, spanning the A44. It lies close to the Worcestershire border and within 3 miles (4.8 km) of the town of Bromyard.

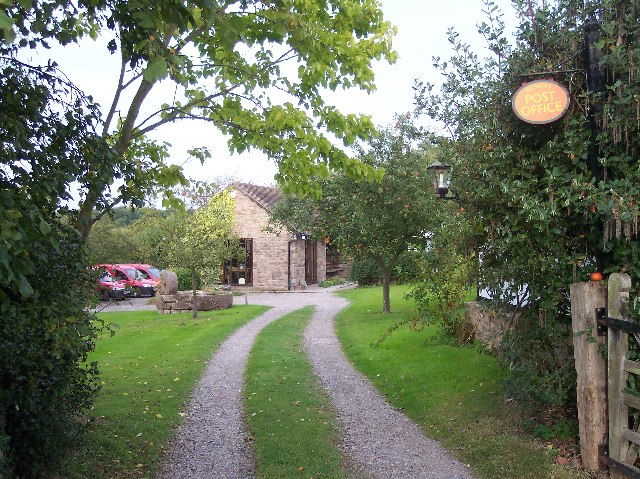
Post office

The area falls within the civil parish of Whitbourne. There is a pub, the Live and Let Live. The Brockhampton Estate lies to the west.
