= Thomas Winwood =

English cricketer

Thomas Lawson Winwood (7 February 1910 – 23 September 1996) was an English first-class cricketer. He was a right-handed batsman and very occasional right arm medium-pace bowler who played 18 times for Worcestershire in the early 1930s. He made 36 on debut against Derbyshire in August 1930, but his most notable innings came in his second first-class innings three weeks later, when he hit 104 in two hours against Hampshire. He never again made more than 30 in an innings.

All but two of Winwood's matches were in 1930 and 1931; he did not play in the next two seasons and made one appearance (against Nottinghamshire in June 1934.

Winwood was born in Dudley (then Worcestershire); he died in Bromyard, Herefordshire at the age of 86.

Note: Wisden gives his year of death as 1997 (and so his age at death as 87), but Cricinfo and CricketArchive both give 1996.
