= Richard Pearsall =

English minister (1698–1762)

Richard Pearsall (29 August 1698 – 10 November 1762) was an English Congregationalist minister and friend of Philip Doddridge.

== Life ==
Born at Kidderminster, Worcestershire, the formative early influences on his religious beliefs were his sisters Hannah and Phoebe. He was later to publish Hannah's diary in 1774 as The Power and Pleasure of Divine Life. Phoebe and Richard were both correspondents of Philip Doddridge; her diary was published by the SPCK. He received his education for the ministry at Tewkesbury, in Gloucestershire, under the famous regime of Samuel Jones, academy tutor. It is not necessarily the case, as stated in some biographies of Pearsall, that he became friends with Thomas Secker and Joseph Butler there, but their careers at the academy almost certainly overlapped, since all three studied there in the late 1710s.

Pearsall was ordained at Bromyard in Herefordshire in 1721, where he spent ten years of his ministry; from here, he moved to Warminster, in Wiltshire, where he remained for 16 years. His third and most important ministry was at Taunton, in Somerset, where he met opposition to his orthodox Calvinist Trinitarianism. He was minister here for about 15 years, from 1747 to 1762.

== Works ==
- The brevity and uncertainty of life, considered and improved, 1740
- The acceptableness of the gospel, 1748
- Charge to Mr. Rooker at his Ordination, 1752
- Contemplations on the ocean, harvest, sickness, and the last judgment, 1753, 1755, 1760
- Early seeking after God opened, and recommended to young ones. In a sermon, 1758
- The saint's satisfaction as awakening in God's likeness, 1758
- Contemplations on butterflies, 1758
- A letter [...] addressed to the Church of Christ, under his pastoral care, 1763
- Reliquiae sacrae: or, meditations on select passages of scripture; and sacred dialogues between a father and his children, 1765
- Contemplations on the harvest. In four letters, 1787
