= John Bromyard =

English Dominican friar

John of Bromyard (John de Bromgeard)
- Title: Dominican friar

Personal life
- Born: John de Bromgeard
- Died: circa 1352

Religious life
- Religion: Catholic

Senior posting
- Period in office: Middle Ages

John Bromyard (d. c. 1352) was an influential English Dominican friar and prolific compiler of preaching aids.

== Life ==
Little is known of his personal life. Bromyard is the name of a town in Herefordshire so it can be conjectured he was born there. Two dates can be cited: in 1326, he was granted a licence to hear confessions in the diocese of Hereford, and in 1352, that licence was granted to another Dominican, presumably after Bromyard's death. There is evidence in his works that he had served in the diocese of Llandaff in South Wales, and he shows familiarity with customs and circumstances in France and Italy. But because the Dominicans were an international order with lively internal communication, this cannot be taken as proof that he had travelled abroad. He was evidently trained in canon law, perhaps at Oxford.

He spent most of his career at the newly founded Dominican priory at Hereford. The Dominicans had been fighting for a foothold here for eighty years against the resistance of the Dean and Chapter, before they were finally established under the patronage of Edward II in 1322. Bromyard must therefore have been among the first friars to join the fledgeling priory. In an age when manuscript books were prohibitively expensive, it is likely that he embarked on the task of compiling preaching aids as a means of providing the priory with a library to support its preaching mission. The sheer volume of his work suggests that it may well have been produced by a collaborative process involving the other friars at the Hereford priory, with Bromyard acting as editor in chief.

== Working methods ==
Bromyard was a pioneer or early adopter of new techniques in the organization of information. Each of his surviving works is provided with an alphabetical index. He employs standardized divisions of his texts, and uses them for systematic cross-references.

As aids to preaching, his works included all manner of preachable material according to the homiletic practice of the time: exempla, authorities from the Church Fathers and bible as well as from classical authors, natural lore, proverbs and verses (some in French or English), etc. He uses "scientific knowledge" (natura ratione) to explain natural phenomenon such as "rain" taking away the mysticism of "acts of God". These explanations are apparently drawn from Greek and Arab ancient texts. (Bromyard: Summa Praedicantium, De Natura Ratione). He was particularly fond of Canon law, devoting the Tractatus iuris to expounding Christian doctrine and morality almost exclusively by means of citations from legal texts. He engages in occasional political commentary on problems in English society, and even criticises abuses in his own Dominican order.

== Influence ==
Bromyard was one of the most influential preachers of the 14th century in England. His Summa Predicantium was cited by many writers of the succeeding generations and used by many more. It was first printed about 1484 in Basel and went through several editions, the last in 1627 in Antwerp. The Tractatus iuris was also printed twice and survives in more than two dozen manuscripts. The Summa is frequently mined by modern scholars in search of literary analogues and materials for social history.

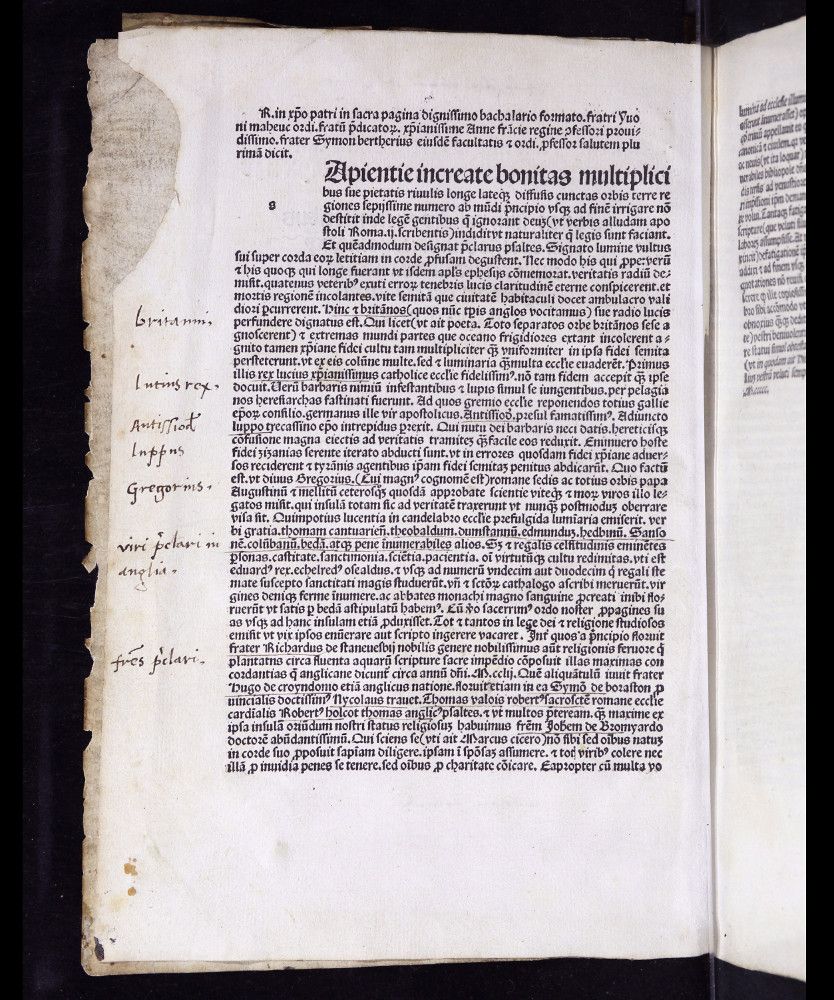
Opening page from Opus trivium with margin notes in a sixteenth-century hand

== Works ==
Bromyard's four surviving works run to 1.75 million words. Five lost works are also known from early bibliographers and from cross-references in the surviving works; they probably brought his total production to between 2.5 and 3 million words.

=== Surviving works ===
- Summa Predicantium
  - Part 1, printed Venice, 1586, at Internet Archive: https://archive.org/details/JohnBromyardSummaPraedicantiumParsPrima1586.
  - Part 2, printed Venice, 1586, at Internet Archive: https://archive.org/details/JohnBromyardSummaPraedicantiumParsSecunda1586.
- Tractatus iuris (Opus trivium)
  - Printed Lyons, 1500. Now at the Bodleian Library, Oxford: http://viewer.bodleian.ox.ac.uk/icv/thumbs.php?book=b_19._4_linc.&page=1&highlight
- Distinctiones
- Exhortaciones
- Sermones

=== Lost works ===
- Registrum
- Collationes
- Additiones
- Persuasiones

== See also ==
- The Canterbury Tales
