= Acton Beauchamp =

Village in Herefordshire, England

Coordinates: 52.148°N 2.475°W

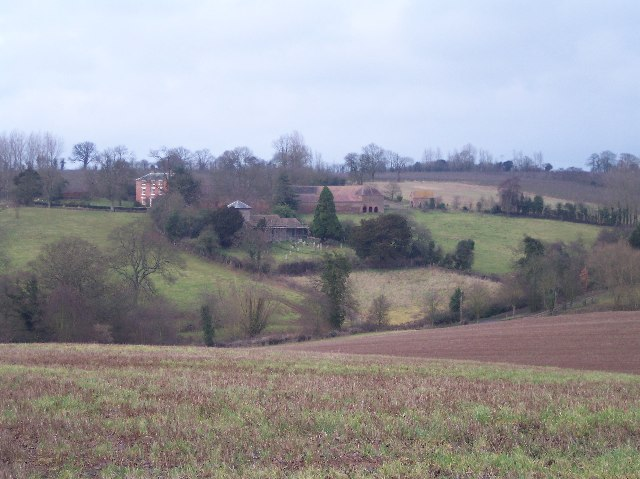
- Acton Beauchamp Church and Church House

- Location within Herefordshire
- Population: 229 (2011 Census)
- Shire county: Herefordshire
- Region: West Midlands
- Country: England
- Sovereign state: United Kingdom
- Post town: WORCESTER
- Postcode district: WR6
- Police: West Mercia
- Fire: Hereford and Worcester
- Ambulance: West Midlands
- UK Parliament: North Herefordshire

Acton Beauchamp (/ˈæktən ˈbiːtʃəm/) is a village and civil parish in Herefordshire, England. It is approximately 12 miles (19 km) north-east from the city and county town of Hereford, and 3 miles (5 km) south-east from the market town of Bromyard. Acton [Beauchamp] was a settlement in Domesday Book, in the hundred of Doddingtree, mentioned in the chapters for Worcestershire and Herefordshire.

== Etymology ==
The name Acton Beauchamp means 'Oak-tree farm'. The 'Beauchamp' part was added later after the Beauchamp family held the manor in the 13th Century. Despite being in Herefordshire, Acton Beauchamp was in the upper division of Worcestershire Doddingtree Hundred. The parish population is scattered among farms, cottages and other housing over the hillsides, and was 229 at the 2011 Census. The village has an intermittent groundwater spring.

The parish church, dedicated to Saint Giles, is built in Norman style, partly rebuilt in 1819. It contains an Anglo Saxon carved stone door lintel reused in the wall of the Norman church tower; the carving depicts a bird, a lion, and what is possibly a goat.

== Links ==
- Profile, nottingham.ac.uk. Accessed 15 September 2022.
- British History Online
- Acton Beauchamp: historical and genealogical information at GENUKI.
- Acton Beauchamp on Vision of Britain
- Acton [Beauchamp] in the Domesday Book

Media related to Acton Beauchamp at Wikimedia Commons
