= Queen Elizabeth High School, Bromyard =

Queen Elizabeth High School

Location
- Panniers Lane; Bromyard, Herefordshire, HR7 4QS; England; 52°11′05″N 2°31′09″W

Information
- Type: Secondary academy
- Motto: Support. Believe. Achieve.
- Established: 1961
- Department for Education URN: 137703 Tables
- Ofsted: Reports
- Chairman: Mac Henderson
- Headmaster: Martin Farmer
- Staff: 42
- Gender: Mixed
- Age: 11 to 16
- Enrolment: 361
- Houses: Griffin, Pegasus, Phoenix, Wyvern
- Colours: Blue, Red, Gold and Green
- Website: http://www.qehs.co/

Queen Elizabeth High School is a coeducational comprehensive secondary school with academy status situated in Herefordshire, on the outskirts of Bromyard. The school meets the educational needs of pupils 11-16, with feeder primary schools including Burley Gate Primary School, St Peters Primary School, Brockhamton Primary School, Bredenbury Primary School. The governing board recently changed the name back to Queen Elizabeth High School from Queen Elizabeth Humanities College.

== History ==
Education in Bromyard can be traced back to 1394 when a chantry school was founded. After the dissolution of the chantries, the school was granted a charter for its re-foundation as a Boys' Grammar School by Elizabeth I in 1566.

In 1958, the Grammar School, which had been admitting boys and girls from the beginning of this century, combined with the secondary school established in 1961 to open the school as Bromyard County Secondary School in 1963.

In 1976, Sixth Form education was concentrated at Hereford Sixth Form College and this school became a comprehensive school catering for pupils aged 11 to 16.

Since 2007, the college has progressed notably, producing high GCSE results. A school inspection in 2011 found that "Teachers, support staff and governors all share a strong sense of moral purpose that their students deserve the best possible education, and this leads to the current culture of continuous improvement and 96% of parents surveyed stated that they were happy with their child's experience of this school" On 1 December 2011, the school officially gained academy status.

A former pupil of the school was Robin Chater, Secretary-General of the Federation of International Employers
