= Ankerdine Hill =

Hill in Worcestershire, England

Coordinates: 52.205549°N 2.387004°W

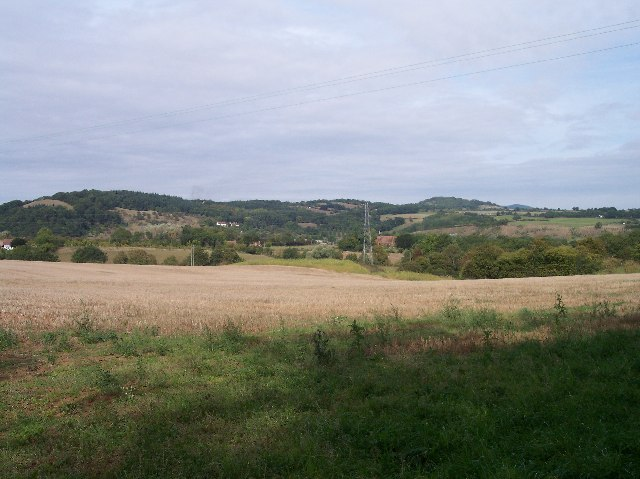
Ankerdine Hill

Ankerdine Hill is a hill with a summit at 149 metres (489 ft) above sea level, in the civil parish of Doddenham in the Malvern Hills district of Worcestershire, England.

During the reign of Edward VI, in October 1552, Princess Elizabeth asked the Dean and Chapter of Worcester Cathedral for a grant of a lease of the farm at Ankerdine, hoping to reward one of her servants with the property. As there was some difficulty, Thomas Parry asked William Cecil to ask the king to sign letters on her behalf.
