= Brockhampton Estate =

Country estate in Herefordshire, England

Coordinates: 52°12′4.68″N 2°27′30.96″W

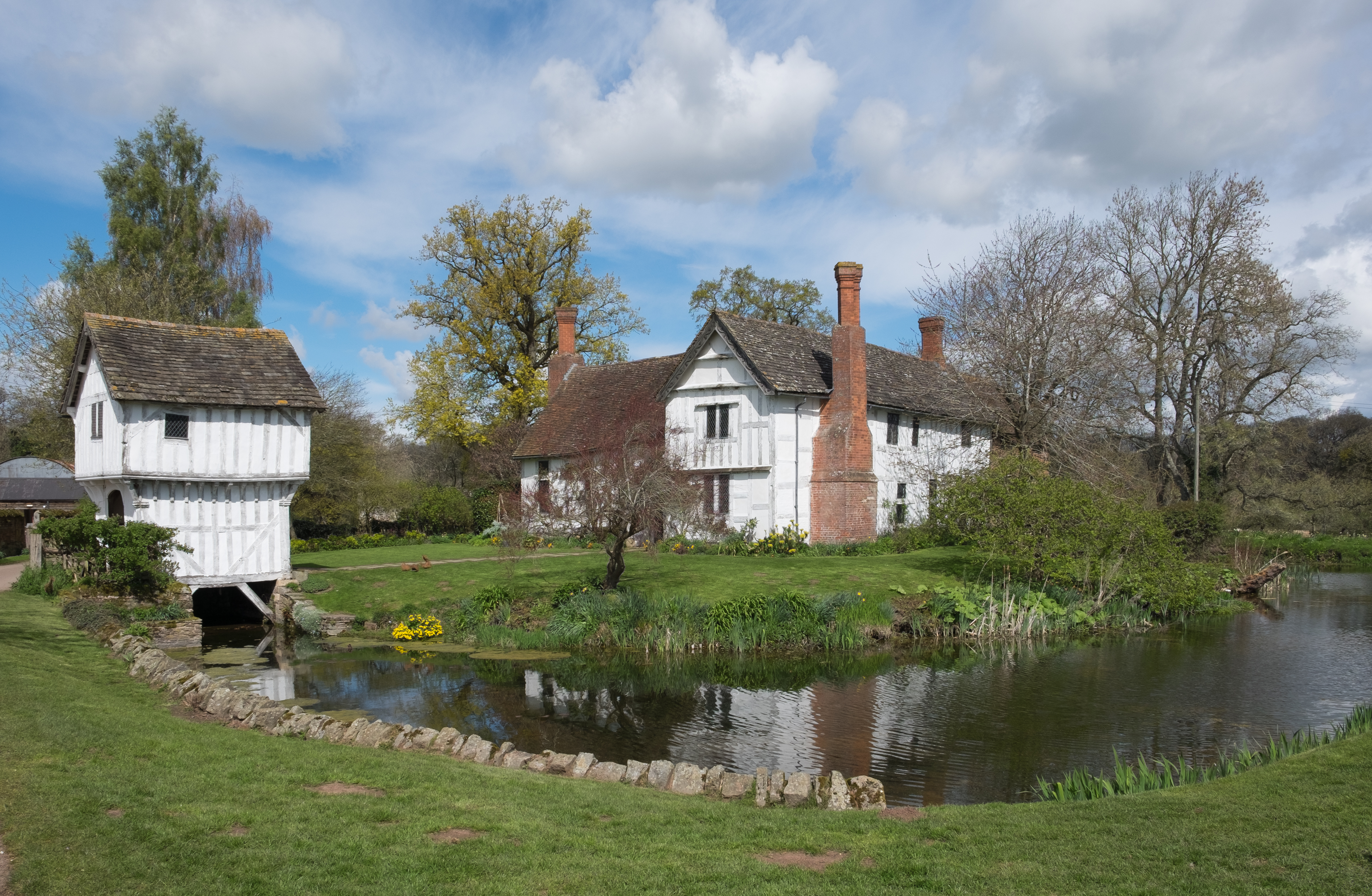
The Lower Brockhampton Manor House

The Brockhampton Estate is a National Trust property in Herefordshire, England. It is located to the north of the A44 Bromyard to Worcester road, opposite the northern edge of Bringsty Common and east of the town of Bromyard.

The significant aspect of the Estate is Lower Brockhampton, a timber framed manor house that dates to the late 14th century, surrounded by a moat, and entered by a restored gatehouse at the front of the house. The house is surrounded by 1,000 acres (400 ha) of farmland, some of it parkland, with specimen trees and 700 acres (280 ha) of woodland. In 2010, the National Trust undertook a major restoration of the house using traditional wattle and daub building methods.

The Brockhampton Estate was bequeathed to the National Trust in 1946 by Colonel John Lutley, whose family had owned it for more than twenty generations, although the family name had changed several times through marriage.

The site of the medieval village of Studmarsh is thought to be on the Estate; in 2012, an archaeological dig unearthed the foundations of two buildings that may have been part of the village.

== Brockhampton and the Barneby family ==
Thomas Barneby, who was killed at the Battle of Towton in 1461, married Isabella Whitgreave of Bockleton, heiress to the Brockhampton estate. One of his descendants was William Barneby, Sheriff of Worcester in 1605, who married Amphylis Lyttleton, a daughter of Sir John Lyttelton (1519–1590).

Amphylis Barneby's niece Bridget Marrow was a gentlewoman at the court of Anne of Denmark from 1603, and became keeper of her jewels. Amphylis wanted her nephew to join the household of Prince Henry. She wrote to her kinswoman, Meriel Lyttelton asking for advice. Lyttleton's reply was discouraging, saying that Amphylis's nephew Thomas Cornewall of Eastham and Burford had misinformed her. Cornewall had joined the Prince's household in 1603. However, when the time was right, Lyttleton's brother Henry Bromley of Holt would help her.
