= Avenbury =

Civil parish in Herefordshire, England

Coordinates: 52.1755°N 2.49631°W

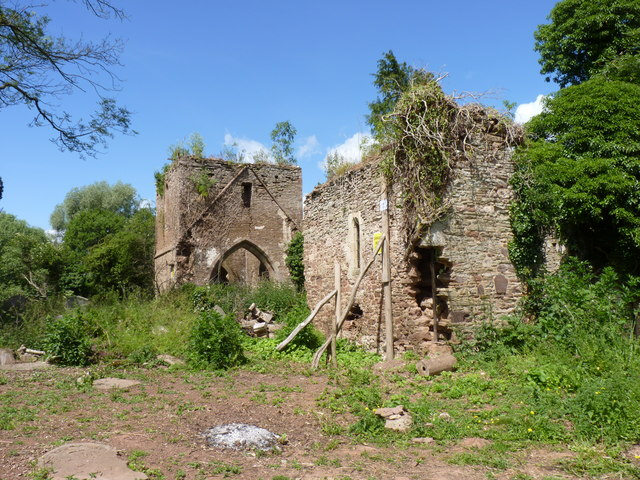
- Ruins of St Mary's Church, Avenbury

- Location within Herefordshire
- Population: 225 (as stated on citypopulation.de)
- OS grid reference: SO6653
- Civil parish: Avenbury
- District: Herefordshire
- Shire county: Herefordshire
- Region: West Midlands
- Country: England
- Sovereign state: United Kingdom
- Police: West Mercia
- Fire: Hereford and Worcester
- Ambulance: West Midlands

Avenbury is a civil parish in Herefordshire, England. It is on the A465, just south of Bromyard, and by the River Frome. The population of this parish at the 2011 Census was 225.

== History ==
Avenbury was mentioned on the Domesday Book. The village that was centred on the church of St Mary has now disappeared leaving the parish consisting of a series of farms and hamlets.

In the post-medieval period the village had a barn and several lime kilns as well as houses.

== Parish church ==
The church was founded ca. 840 AD but rebuilt in Norman times; the tower was built in the 13th century. The church was closed in 1931. Many of the Baskerville family are buried in the churchyard. Three of the bells were rehung in St Andrew by the Wardrobe, London, in 1933.

In May 2007 the church, which had been acquired by a pagan and artist named Leszek Skuriat in the 1970s was put up for sale and a trust created to buy it for preservation. In June 2009 St Mary's church was bought by a local archaeologist. In conjunction with English Heritage, restoration work on the church has commenced: St Mary's is a Grade II* listed building, a scheduled monument and is on the Heritage at Risk Register.
