= Castle Frome =

Village and civil parish in England

Coordinates: 52.271794°N 2.7388138°W

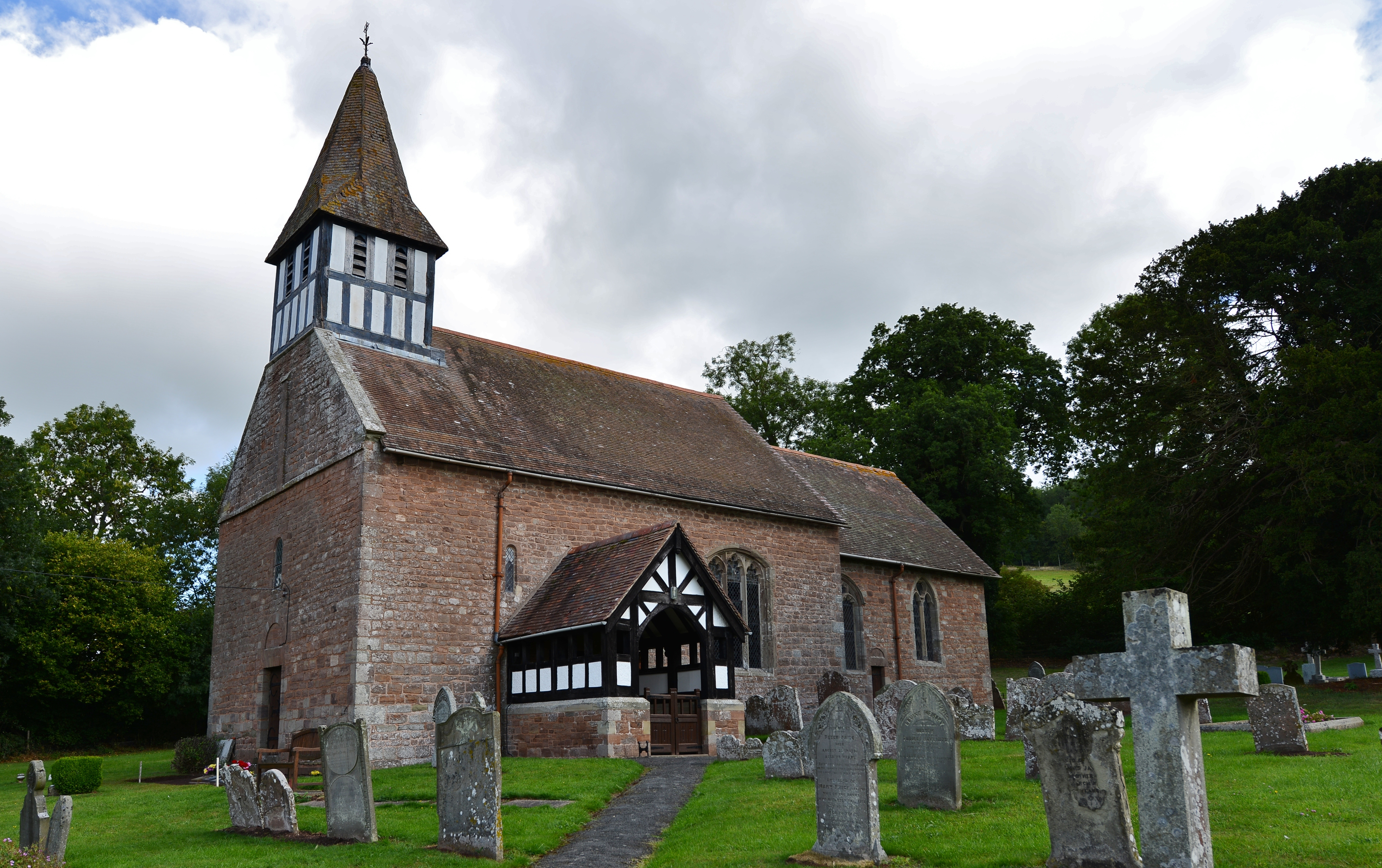
- St Michael's Church

- Location within Herefordshire
- OS grid reference: SO496639
  - London: 110 mi (180 km) SE
- Unitary authority: Herefordshire
- Ceremonial county: Herefordshire
- Region: West Midlands
- Country: England
- Sovereign state: United Kingdom
- Post town: LEDBURY
- Postcode district: HR8
- Dialling code: 01568
- Police: West Mercia
- Fire: Hereford and Worcester
- Ambulance: West Midlands
- UK Parliament: North Herefordshire

Castle Frome is a village and civil parish in the county of Herefordshire, England, and is 10 miles (16 km) north-east from the city and county town of Hereford. The closest large town is the market town of Bromyard, 5 miles (8 km) to the north. The Norman font in Castle Frome church is "one of the outstanding works of the Herefordshire School".

== History ==
The affix 'Castle' signifies the existence of the Norman fortress. 'Frome' is taken from the Frome river and this from the Celtic 'ffraw' meaning "fair, fine, brisk", the settlement in 1242 written as "Froma Castri".

Listed in the Domesday Book as "Frume", at the time of the Norman Conquest Castle Frome was in the Hundred of Radlow in the county of Herefordshire. The manor had assets of 19 households, seven villagers, one freeman, ten slaves, and one reeve, and a mill which was valued at 10 shillings. The area of land under plough was defined by three lord's and seven men's plough teams. In 1066 Brictmer (son of Queneva), under the overlordship of the earl Harold Godwinson, held the lordship, which passed in 1086 to Roger de Lacy who was also the manor's tenant-in-chief to king William I. In 1645, during the English Civil War, the manor house under the command of Sir John Barnard was attacked by Scottish Covenanter forces under the Earl of Leven on their way to besiege Hereford. After storming the house Leven's men massacred or executed most of the Royalist garrison including Barnard.

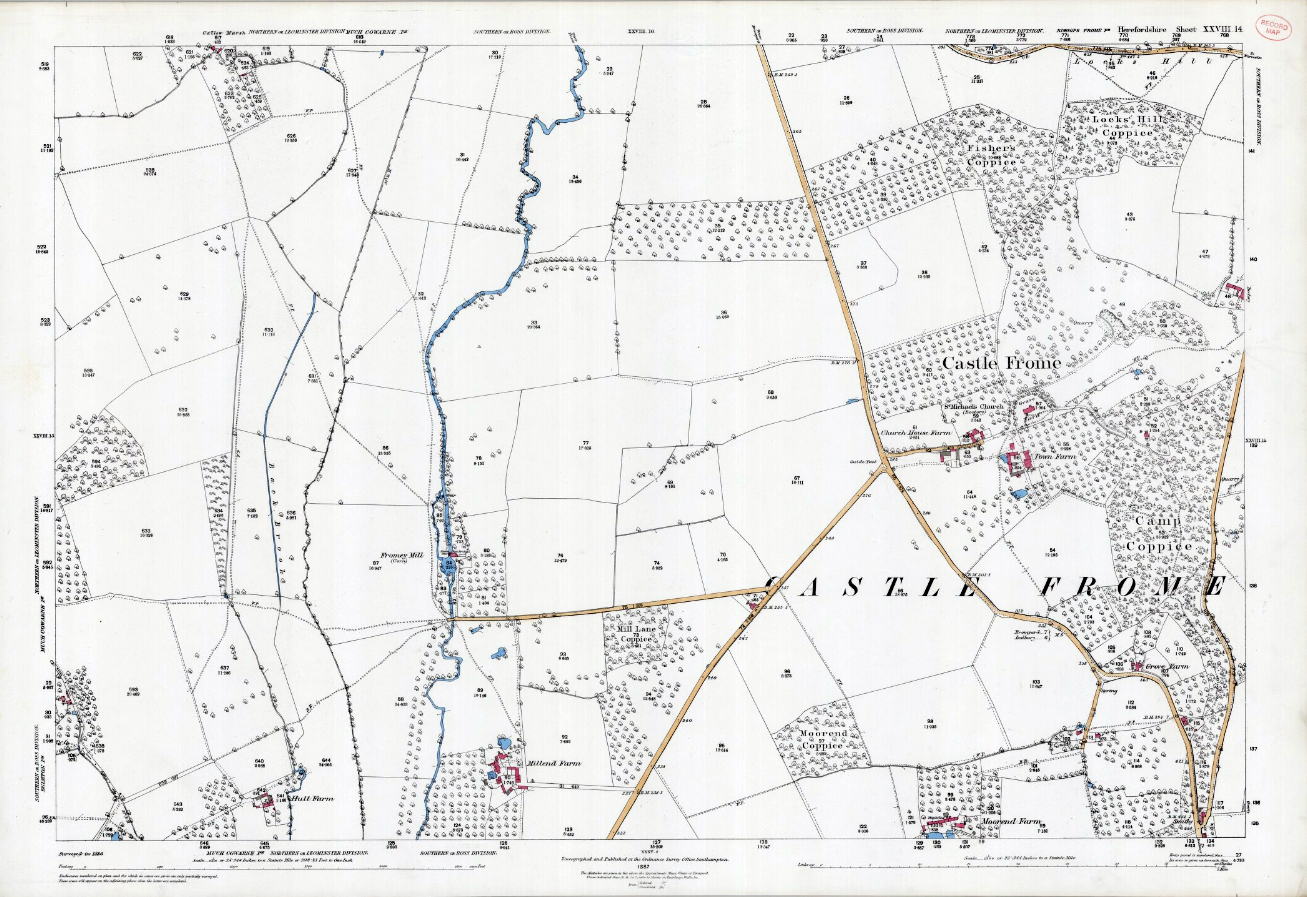
Castle Frome in 1887

In 1909 the parish is described as being on the road from Ledbury to Bromyard, and 5 miles north-east from Ashperton station on the Hereford and Worcester section of the Great Western Railway. It was in the Southern division of Herefordshire, the Radlow hundred, and the Union—poor relief and joint parish workhouse provision set up under the Poor Law Amendment Act 1834—petty sessional division and county court district of Ledbury. The ecclesiastical parish was in the rural deanery of Ledbury and the archdeaconry of the Diocese of Hereford. St Michael's Church was described as a "small building of stone" in the Norman and Perpendicular style, comprising a nave, chancel, a south porch and a "low wooden" turret at the west with three bells. Fixtures and fittings included a "fine example" of a stone font carved with emblems of the Evangelists. An alabaster altar tomb, contemporary with Charles I, was noted which displayed "splendidly carved" full length effigies of a cavalier and his wife who were members of the Unett family; there were further memorial wall tablets to the same family. The church, with seating for 160 people and a church register which dates to 1757, was restored in 1878 at a cost of £1,200 by B. Martin Buckle, an architect from Malvern. The living was a rectory which was valued at £220 a year net income, and also included 59 acres (24 ha) of glebe—an area of land used to support a parish priest—and a residence.

The 1909 lord of the manor was Lt.-General Sir Edward Hopton KCB of Homend, Stretton Grandison. The principal landowner was Col. John Dutton Hopton of Canon Frome Court. Parish soil of 1,566 acres (634 ha) is described as mixed and heavy, with a subsoil of clay and "water rock", on which were grown wheat, beans and hops. Parish population in 1901 was 192. The post office accepted and delivered mail through Ledbury; Bosbury as the closest money order and telegraph office. The parish Public Elementary School was built in 1898 for 70 pupils and had an average 1909 attendance of 60. Commercial trades and occupation in the parish included eight farmers, six of whom also grew hops, a baker, and the assistant overseer for Castle Frome and Bishops Frome.

== Geography ==
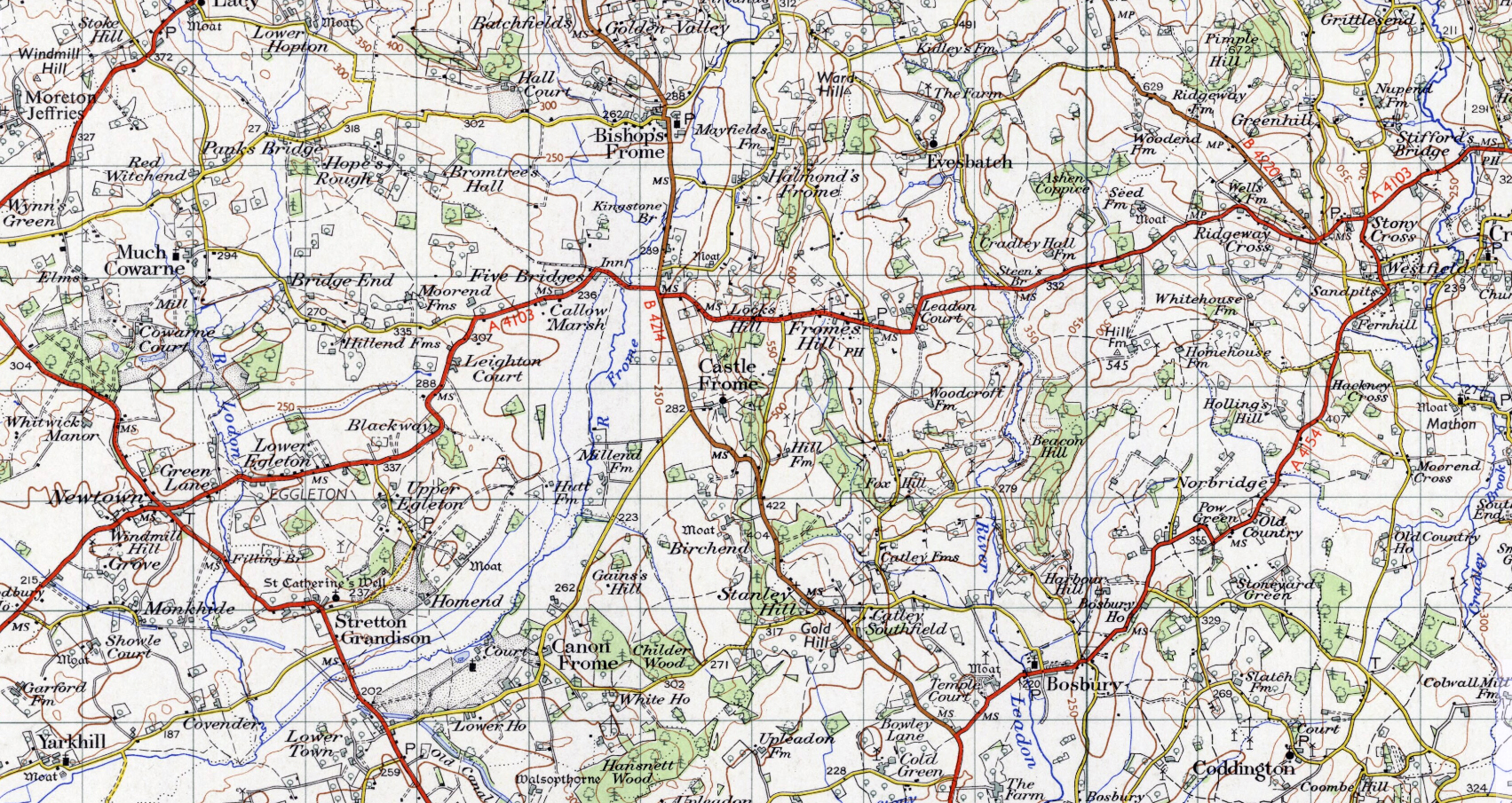
Castle Frome in 1960

Castle Frome is approximately 2 miles (3 km) from north to south and 1.75 miles (3 km) east to west, and covers an area of 6.33 square kilometres (633 ha). Adjacent parishes are Bishops Frome at the north and north-east, Much Cowarne at the west, Canon Frome at the south-west, and Bosbury at the south-east. The parish is rural, of farms, fields, managed woodland and coppices, water courses, isolated and dispersed businesses, and residential properties.

The A4103 east to west Hereford to Worcester road at the north of the parish partly forms the boundary with Bishops Frome. The only through route, and though the centre of the parish, is the north to south B4214 Bromyard to Ledbury road. Two minor roads run from the B4214, one to the village of Canon Frome at the south-west, the other to the A4103 at the small village of Fromes Hill at the extreme north-east. All other routes are country lanes, farm tracks, access roads and footpaths. The River Frome flows north to south near the western edge of the parish. The Back Brook, a further watercourse to the west of and flowing parallel to the River Frome partly forms the boundary with Much Cowarne. At the east of the parish is Catley Brook, with its source at the north-east, and dammed to form four ponds, which flows into and becomes part of the boundary with Bosbury, where it flows into the River Leadon.

== Governance ==
Castle Frome is represented in the lowest tier of UK governance by two members on the nine-member Stretton Grandison Group Parish Council, which also includes the parish of Canon Frome, Stretton Grandison, and Eggleton. As Herefordshire is a unitary authority—no district council between parish and county councils—the parish sends one councillor, representing the Three Crosses ward, to Herefordshire County Council. Castle Frome is represented in the UK Parliament as part of the North Herefordshire constituency.

In 1974 Castle Frome became part of the Malvern Hills District of the now defunct county of Hereford and Worcester, instituted under the Local Government Act 1972.

== Community ==
There is one bus route through the parish, on the B4214, with connection between Ledbury and Bromyard, and villages between. The closest National Rail connection is at Hereford railway station, 11 miles (18 km) to the south-west on the Crewe to Newport Welsh Marches Line. At Worcester, 12 miles (19 km) to the north-east are Worcester Foregate Street, Shrub Hill, and Worcestershire Parkway railway stations, with connections to London, Birmingham, Oxford, Bristol, Nottingham and Cardiff.

The nearest hospital is Ledbury Community Hospital at Ledbury, with the nearest major hospital Hereford County Hospital at Hereford. The nearest primary school is Bosbury C of E School at Bosbury. The parish falls under the mixed secondary school catchment area for The John Masefield High School & Sixth Form Centre at Ledbury. The Anglican parish church of St James is in the Bromyard Deanery of the Diocese of Hereford. It is part of the rural eight-parish Frome Valley Churches benefice comprising Acton Beauchamp, Bishops Frome, Castle Frome, Evesbatch, Fromes Hill, Much Cowarne, Ocle Pychard and Stanford Bishop with Linley Green.

== Landmarks ==
There is one Grade I and nine Grade II listed buildings in Castle Frome.

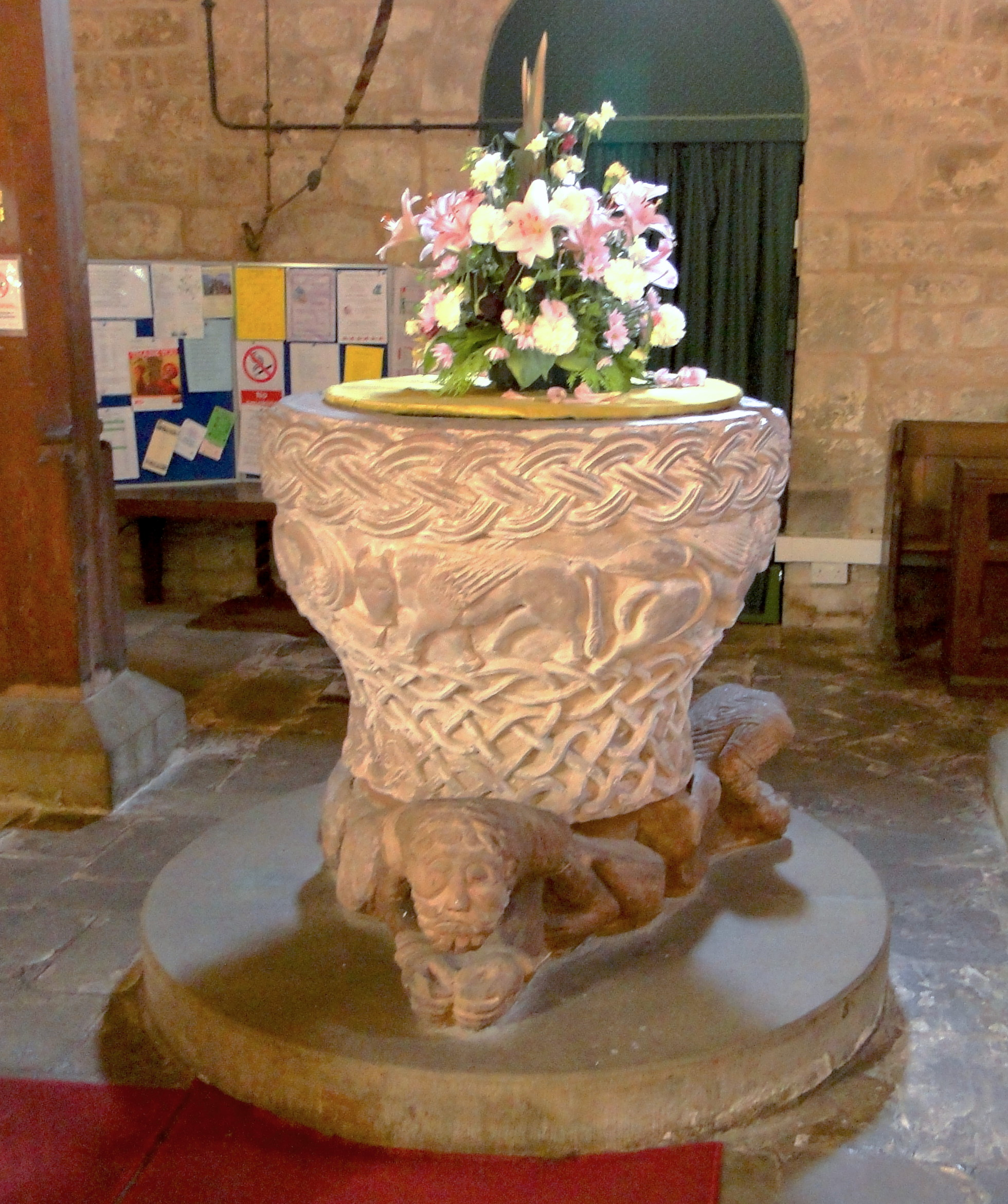
St Michael's Church font

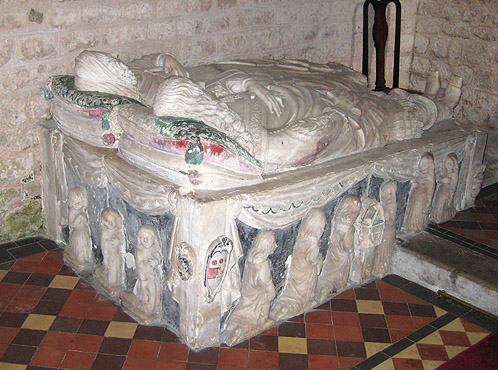
17th-century chest tomb

The Grade I Church of St Michael dates to the 12th century, and was restored in 1878 by Malvern architect B. Martin Buckle, who also added a bell turret at the west of the nave. It comprises a nave, a chancel, a south porch, and a north vestry. Built of sandstone and dressed with ashlar, it has a tiled roof on which sits at the west the timber-framed bell tower with a shingled broach spire. The gabled porch is also of timber framing over a brick plinth. The square-plan nave is of three bays, with a 15th-century window at the south. The chancel is of two bays, with two 15th-century traceried windows at both the north and south, and a 15th-century east window comprising three cinquefoil-headed lights. The chancel c.1500 ceiling is panelled with moulded ribs with decorative bosses. Fixtures an fittings include an 18th-century pulpit, and a c.1140 red sandstone font, its bowl, sitting on crouching figures, carved with interlaced decoration top and bottom, in between which are carvings representing the Baptism of Christ, the Evangelists, the hand of God, and two doves. The listing states the font to be "one of the outstanding works of the Herefordshire school of sculpture with a mixture of local and French and Italian elements". Within the chancel is a tomb chest memorial, dating to c.1630-40, to members of the Unett family, of sandstone with recumbent alabaster effigies of a male and female in civil costume. Along the sides of the tomb are ranged weepers in the form of kneeling children. A chancel stone and slate wall tablet memorial to Francis Unett is dated 1656. A brass plaque commemorates five who died in the First World War and one in the Second.

On the River Frome (at SO65584560), are the remains of the two-storey Fromey Mill, with elements dating to the 16th century. At 460 yards (420 m) west from the B4214 road and at the border with Bosbury (at SO66734464), are the remains of a medieval homestead moat.

At 350 yards (320 m) west from St Michael's Church (at SO67094584), are the earthwork remains of a Motte-and-bailey castle. The motte, being 14 feet (4.3 m) high and 60 yards (55 m) in diameter, is surrounded on all sides but the south by ring-work outside of which is a "deep" ditch; at the south side is a causeway accessing the motte. The site is covered by woodland and is "virtually impenetrable". Frome Castle might be from where the land of Walter de Lacy was controlled following the Norman conquest of England. After a brief control by the king, the castle returned to the de Lacey's after 1216, and then in 1244 might have been rebuilt by Gilbert de Lacy perhaps using £600 borrowed from Walter de Lacy.
