= Canon Frome =

Hamlet and rural parish in Herefordshire, England

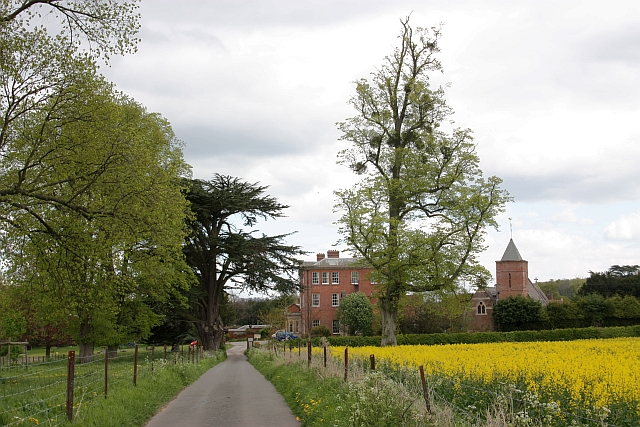
- Canon Frome Court and church from the west
- Interactive map of the Canon Frome area

General information
- Location: Herefordshire, England, England
- Coordinates: 52.089°N 2.520°W
- Construction started: 16th century
- Completed: 1860

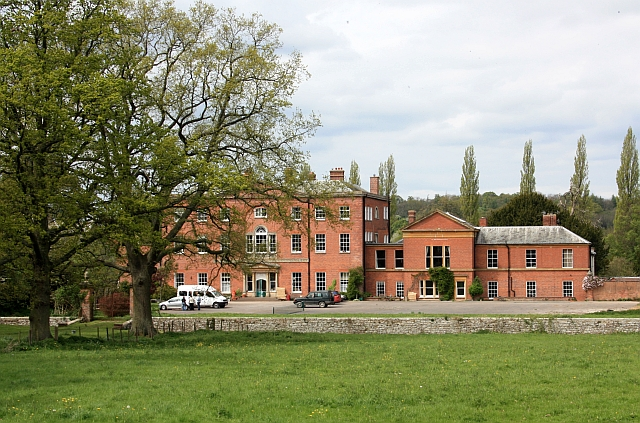
Canon Frome Court

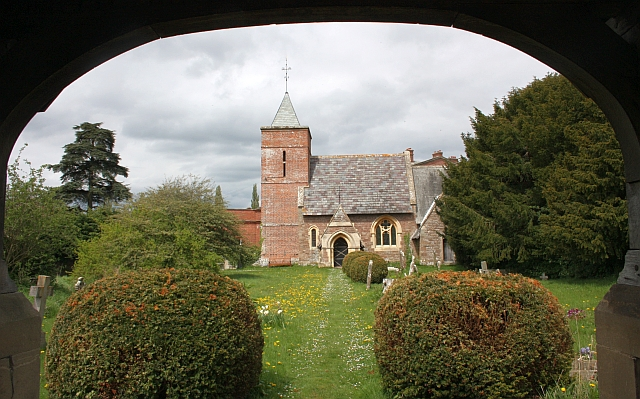
Parish Church of St. James

Canon Frome is a hamlet and small rural parish on the River Frome, 5 miles northwest of Ledbury, Herefordshire, England, with a population of 139. Its most notable feature is Canon Frome Court which is a Grade II listed large red brick country house. The house was originally a sixteenth century moated manor house but was extensively rebuilt, incorporating earlier parts of the building, in 1786 and again in 1868. It was for 300 years the ancestral home of the Hopton family. It now forms a cohousing community.

== History ==
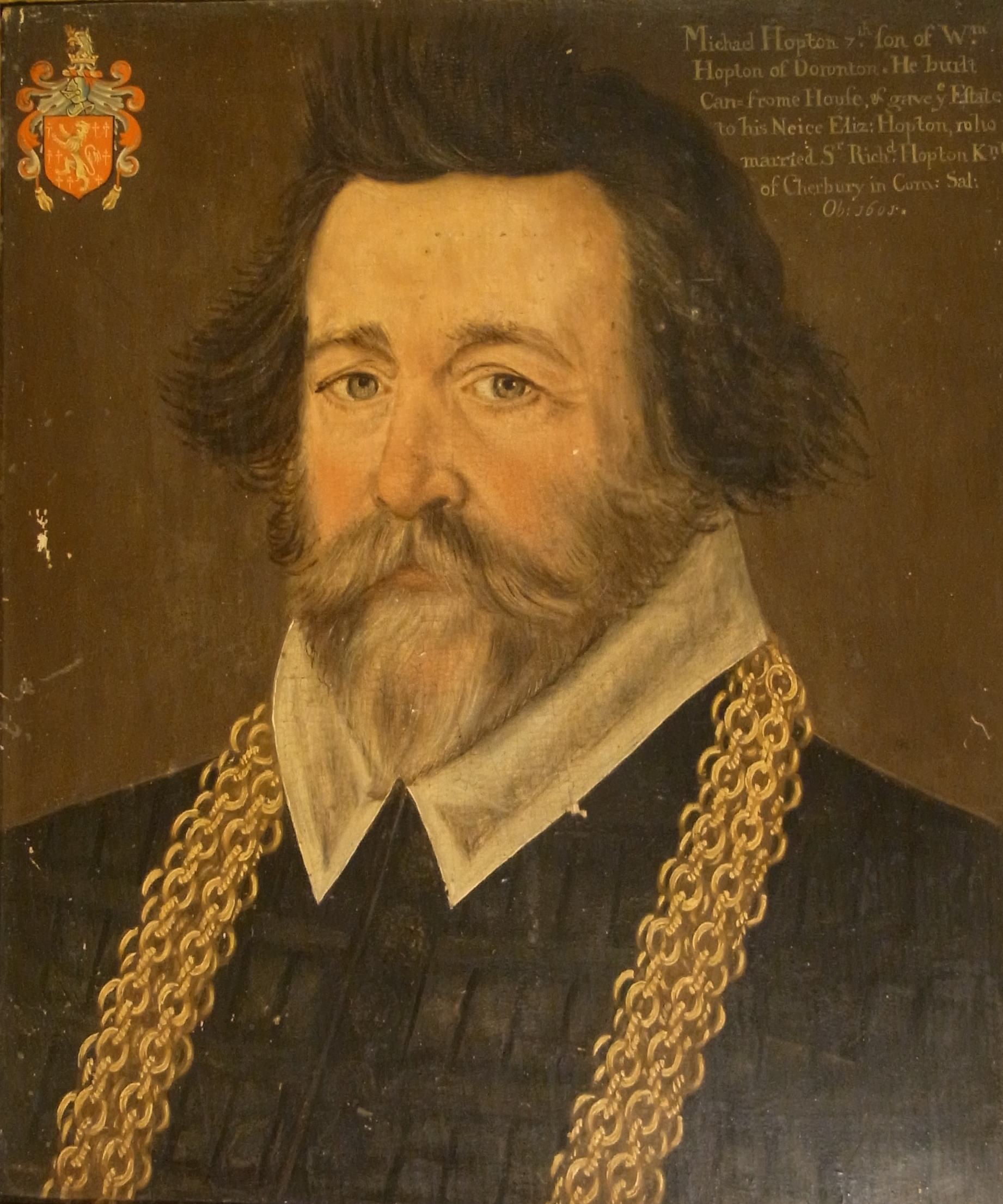
Michael Hopton

The first known occupation of the site was by the Roman army who had a fort near the river, the remains of which are still traceable today. The Canons of Llanthony Abbey established themselves here in 1280.

The Hoptons came to prominence at Canon Frome through the marriage in 1591 of Michael Hopton, a knight of Shropshire, to a widow named Martha Hareford, the heiress of the Canon Frome estate.

During the English Civil War the then moated house contained a Royalist garrison under a Colonel John Barnold with 120 men. It was captured in 1645 by a Scots army under the Earl of Leven advancing to besiege Hereford. The house was ransacked, and some 70 men of the garrison were killed by Parliament's men. Many of the dead were buried where they fell. There was said to be a field named Bloody Acre in the area.

Oliver Cromwell is reputed to have rested at the house sometime before the Battle of Ledbury in 1645.

== Canon Frome Court ==
The present house was built in 1786 and is attributed to architect Anthony Keck working for Richard Cope Hopton (1738–1810). It is considered a fine example of late eighteenth century architecture. The house was extended and modernised in the 1870s by the architect John Middleton. The house was designated as Grade II listed in 1952.

Inside the building are some re-set earlier fittings. Notably in the former Billiard Room is a late 16th-century carved wood overmantel consisting of two bays with the initials I. H. and female figures representing Prudence, Justice, and Wisdom.

The driveway to the Court is flanked by imposing red brick pillars dated to 1905 which support iron gates. On top of the pillars are unusual sandstone statues: one is the figure of a griffin's head with a bloody hand in its mouth, the other is a talbot hound, chained and wearing a floral collar, and resting its paw on a saltire. These are all elements of the Hopton coat of arms.

The house and land was bought by Hereford County Council in 1957 and it became a state secondary school. The school closed in 1978 and the house was bought by the Windflower Housing Association, a cohousing community, and it is now divided into 20 apartments with some common areas. The land is worked collectively.

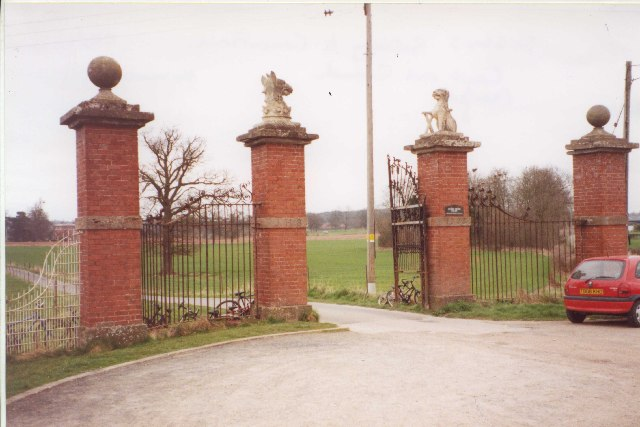
Gateway to Canon Frome Court

== Parish church ==
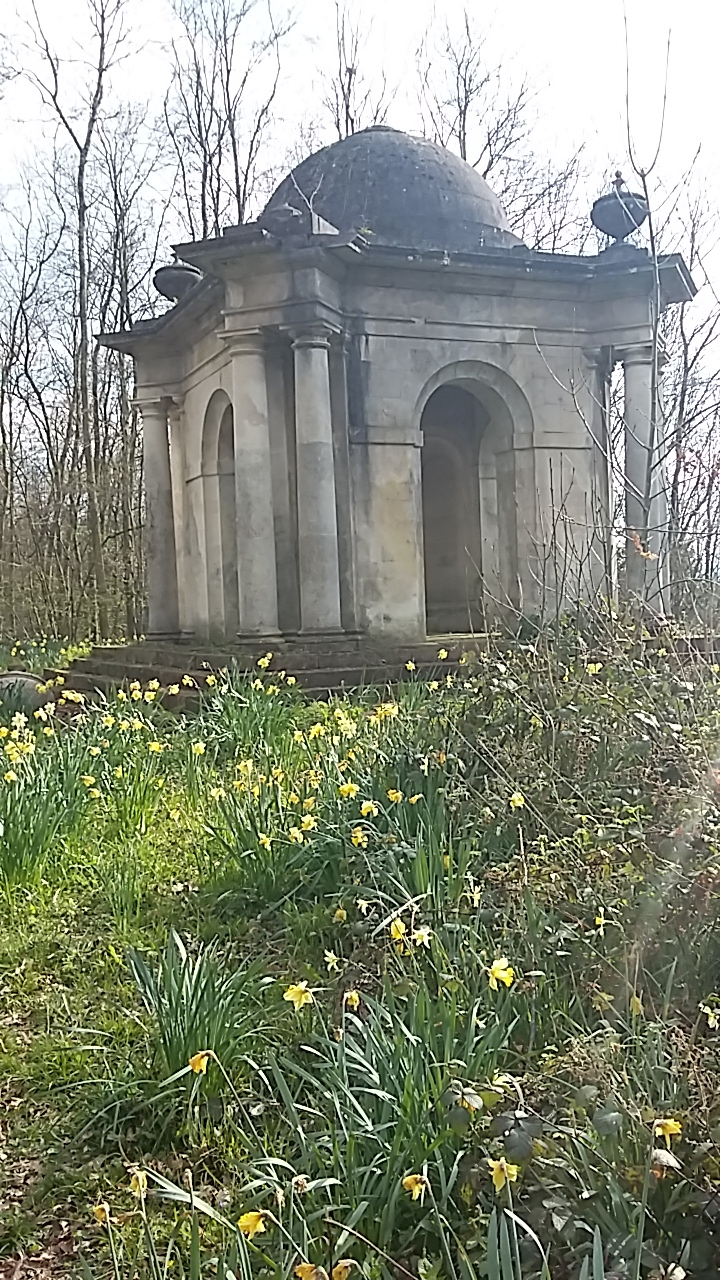
John Hopton's mausoleum at Meephill

The parish church of St. James, close by Canon Frome Court House, is the third sacred building to occupy the site. The red brick West Tower was built in 1680, but the rest of the church was rebuilt in 1860 by the architect George Bodley. It is in the early English style, with an ornate chancel and alabaster reredos.

Today the church is part of the Hop Churches benefice, alongside six other rural parishes.

== Notable people ==
Colonel John Dutton Hopton (1858–1934) of Canon Frome Court was an Olympic sharpshooter and a director of the Royal Academy of Music. He is buried at the top of Meephill to the east of the parish. His grave is marked by an impressive stone classical temple that has outstanding resonant musical qualities. This mausoleum marks the spot from which he once hit a bulls-eye 1500 yards away at Old Birchend.

== Governance ==
The first tier of local government is Stretton Grandison Group Parish Council, which also encompasses the parishes of Stretton Grandison, Castle Frome and Eggleton.

Canon Frome is part of the electoral ward called Frome. The population of this ward taken at the 2011 census was 3,450.

== Bibliography ==
- Burke's and Saville's Guide to Country Houses, 1980, p 13; RCHM Vol II, p 45, item 2; BoE, p 98.
- Sir Nikolaus Pevsner Buildings of England, Herefordshire, Volume 25, 1961, Page 98. ISBN 9780140710250
