= Eggleton =

Eggleton may refer to:

- Eggleton, Herefordshire, civil parish in England
- Eggleton (surname), English surname
- Eggleton, West Virginia, unincorporated community in Putnam County, West Virginia

== See also ==
- Eggleston
- Egleton
