= River Frome, Herefordshire =

River in Herefordshire, England

Frome
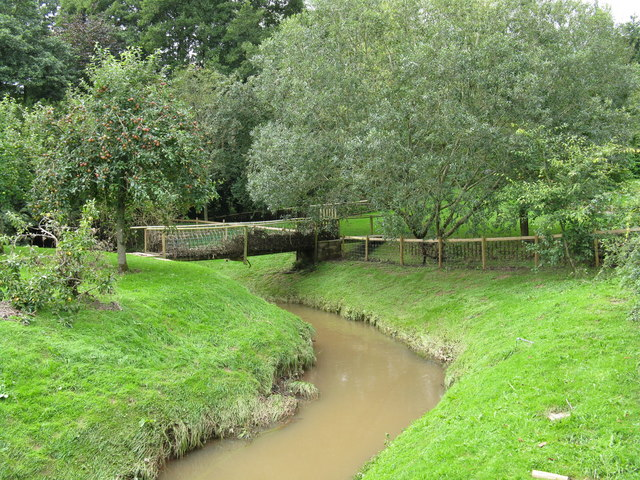
- The river at Rowden Mill

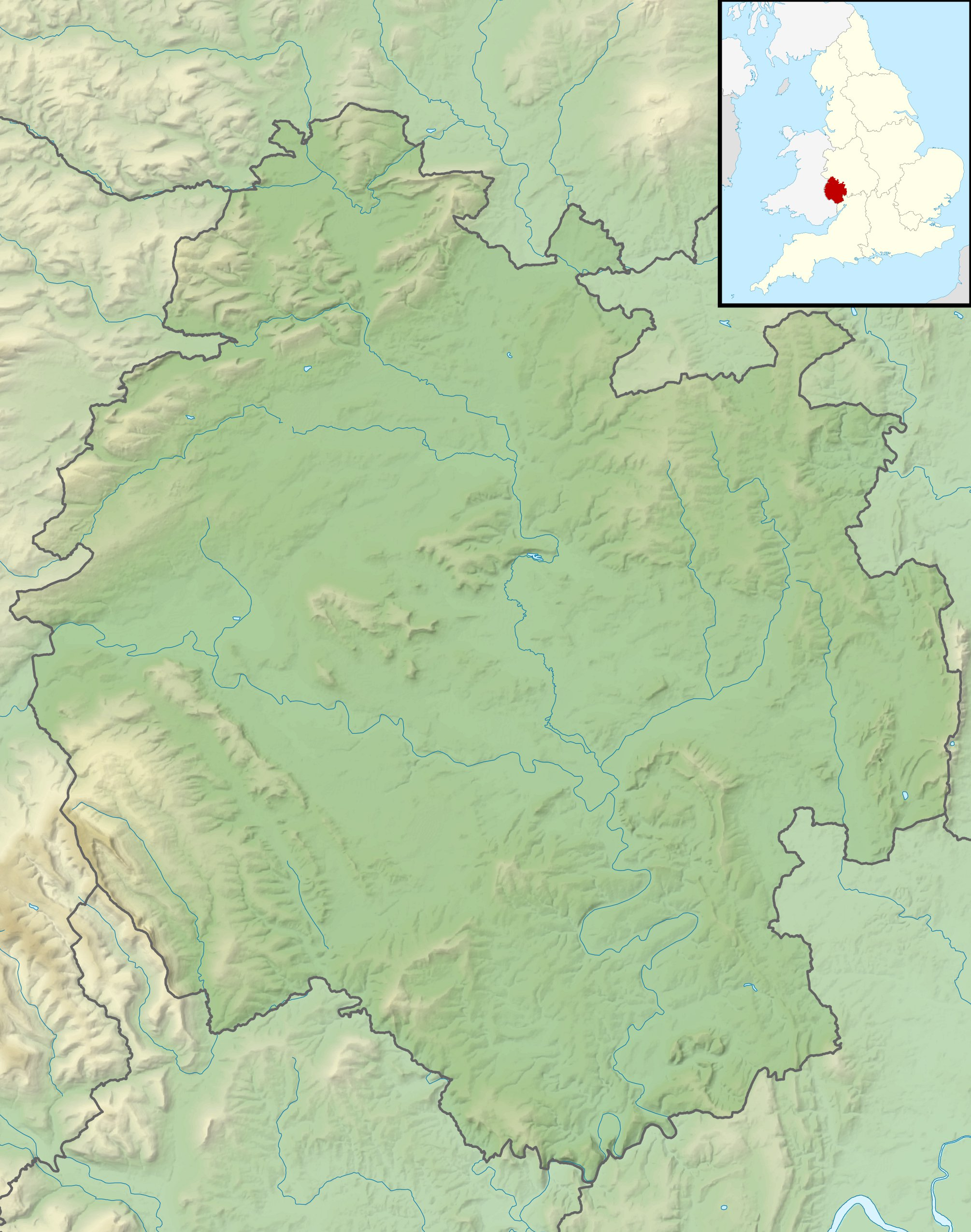
- Mouth shown within its county, Herefordshire

Location
- Country: United Kingdom
- County/Unitary Authority: Herefordshire
- towns: Bromyard

Physical characteristics
- Mouth: River Lugg
  - location: facing parish of Hampton Bishop, the eastern approach to the city of Hereford
  - coordinates: 52.061°N 2.635°W

Basin features
- Tributaries
  - right: River Lodon or Lodon Brook
- etymology: (to be discussed)

The River Frome is a river in Herefordshire, England. It flows through Bromyard, and Bishops Frome. Immediately below the depopulated village of Stretton Grandison its tributary, the river or brook named the Lodon, joins it. It then flows west, past Yarkhill and the farmstead or locality of Prior's Frome before its confluence with the Lugg (which skirts the north side of Hereford here) at Hampton Bishop about 2 miles (3.2 km) before the latter joins the Wye.

The valley lies in the Old Red Sandstone formations of this part of Herefordshire, revealing much evidence of the region's geological past. It has left many exposures of Devonian and late Silurian sandstones and mudstones, and has created a landscape that demonstrates the effects of successive phases of glaciofluvial erosion. The river source is on the Bromyard plateau where it cuts through rocks of the St. Maughan's Formation. At the village of Bishop's Frome, the Bishop's Frome Limestone marks the transition to the older, Silurian Raglan Mudstone Formation and enters a broad, low-lying area, where the effects of both the Anglian and Devensian glacial stages can be seen in the rocks and landscape.

The river gives its name to hamlets on the high ground to the east: Halmond's Frome, Fromes Hill and Castle Frome.

In 2007, like many other rivers in England, the Frome burst its banks. This occurred at places including lower parts of Bromyard, causing homes to be evacuated. A smaller scale recurrence occurred in April and July 2012.

== See also ==
- Rivers of the United Kingdom
