= F. R. Kempson =

English architect

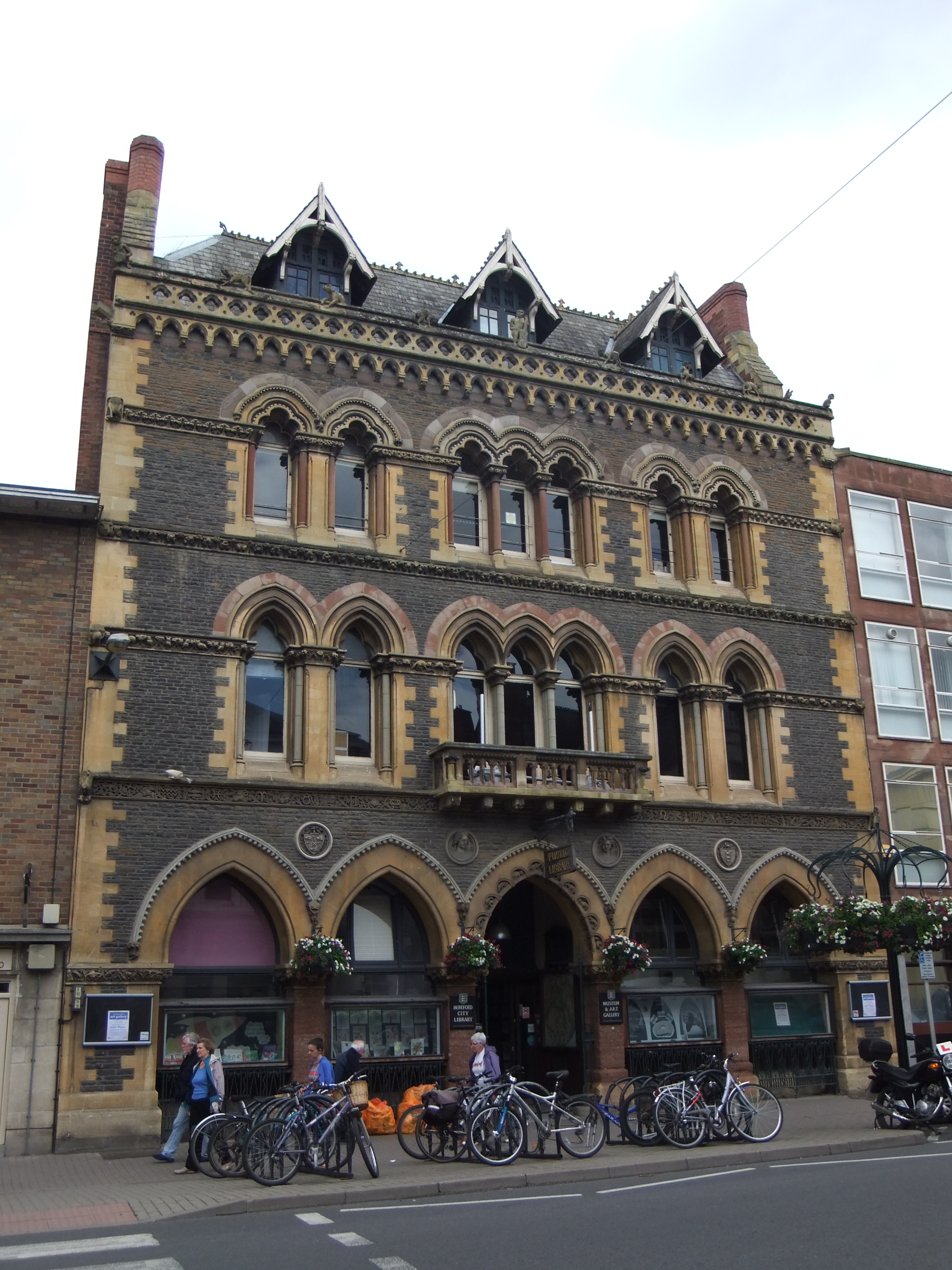
- Hereford Library and Museum designed by F. R. Kempson
- Born: 1838; Stoke Lacy, Herefordshire, England
- Died: 1923 (aged 84–85); Chelsea, London, England
- Occupation: Architect

Frederick Roberston Kempson (1838 – 1923) was an English architect.

Known as F. R. Kempson, he was born at Stoke Lacy in Herefordshire to William Brooke Kempson (1796 - 1859), the rector of Stoke Lacy, and his wife Elizabeth (née Roberston).

Following training he became a member of the Royal Institute of British Architects and a diocesan architect, designing, rebuilding and restoring buildings, particularly churches, chiefly in Herefordshire but also in Wales. His work for Herefordshire churches included that for St Mary's at Bishop's Frome in 1861–62, St Peter and St Paul's at Stoke Lacy in 1863, and St Paul's at Tupsley in Hereford in 1864–65. His Herefordshire secular building designs include Hereford Museum and Library, built in 1873–74 in Venetian Gothic style; Sir James Rankin's house, Bryngwyn Manor, at Much Dewchurch in 1868; the restoration of Burton Court in Eardisland in 1865; and Cheyney Court at Bishop's Frome in 1870. His works in Wales include St Peter's Church in Pentre, with fellow architect John Bacon Fowler.

Kempson married Julia Madeleine Jay in 1866; the marriage produced six children. His granddaughter Rachel (1910–2003), was married to the actor Sir Michael Redgrave.
