= Eggleton (surname) =

Eggleton (/ˈɛɡ.əl.tən/) is an English surname, derived from either Egleton in Rutland or Eggleton, Herefordshire.

Notable people with this surname include:

- Art Eggleton (born 1943), Canadian politician
- Ben Eggleton (born 1970), Australian physicist
- Bob Eggleton (born 1960), American artist
- David Eggleton (born 1952), New Zealand author
- Jaimee Eggleton (born 1964), Canadian figure skater
- Jimmy Eggleton (1897–1963), English footballer
- Mark Eggleton, Australian musician
- Philip Eggleton (1903–1954), British biochemist
- Tony Eggleton (1932–2023), Australian politician
