= St Mary's Church, Bishop's Frome =

Church of St Mary the Virgin
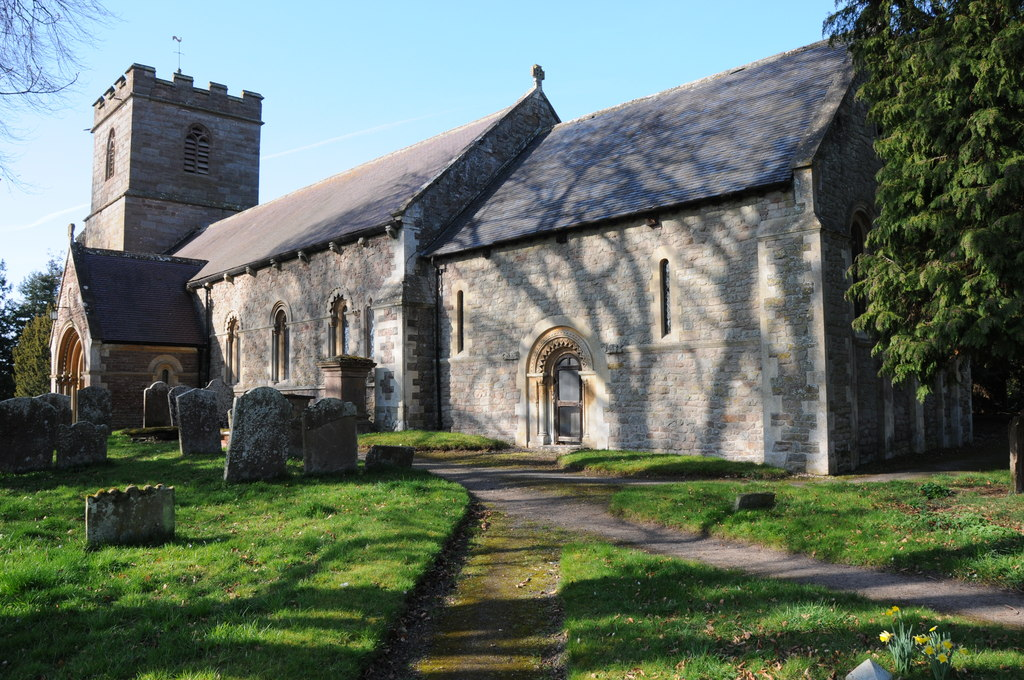
- Church of St Mary the Virgin
- 52°07′55.56″N 2°29′35.38″W
- OS grid reference: SO 66340 48313
- Location: Bishop's Frome, Herefordshire
- Country: England
- Denomination: Church of England

Architecture
- Heritage designation: Grade II*
- Designated: 8 June 1967

Administration
- Diocese: Hereford
- Archdeaconry: Hereford
- Deanery: Bromyard

St Mary's Church is an Anglican church in Bishop's Frome, in Herefordshire, England, and in the Diocese of Hereford. The earliest parts date from the 12th century; restoration in the 19th century includes neo-Norman features. It is Grade II* listed.

== History and description ==
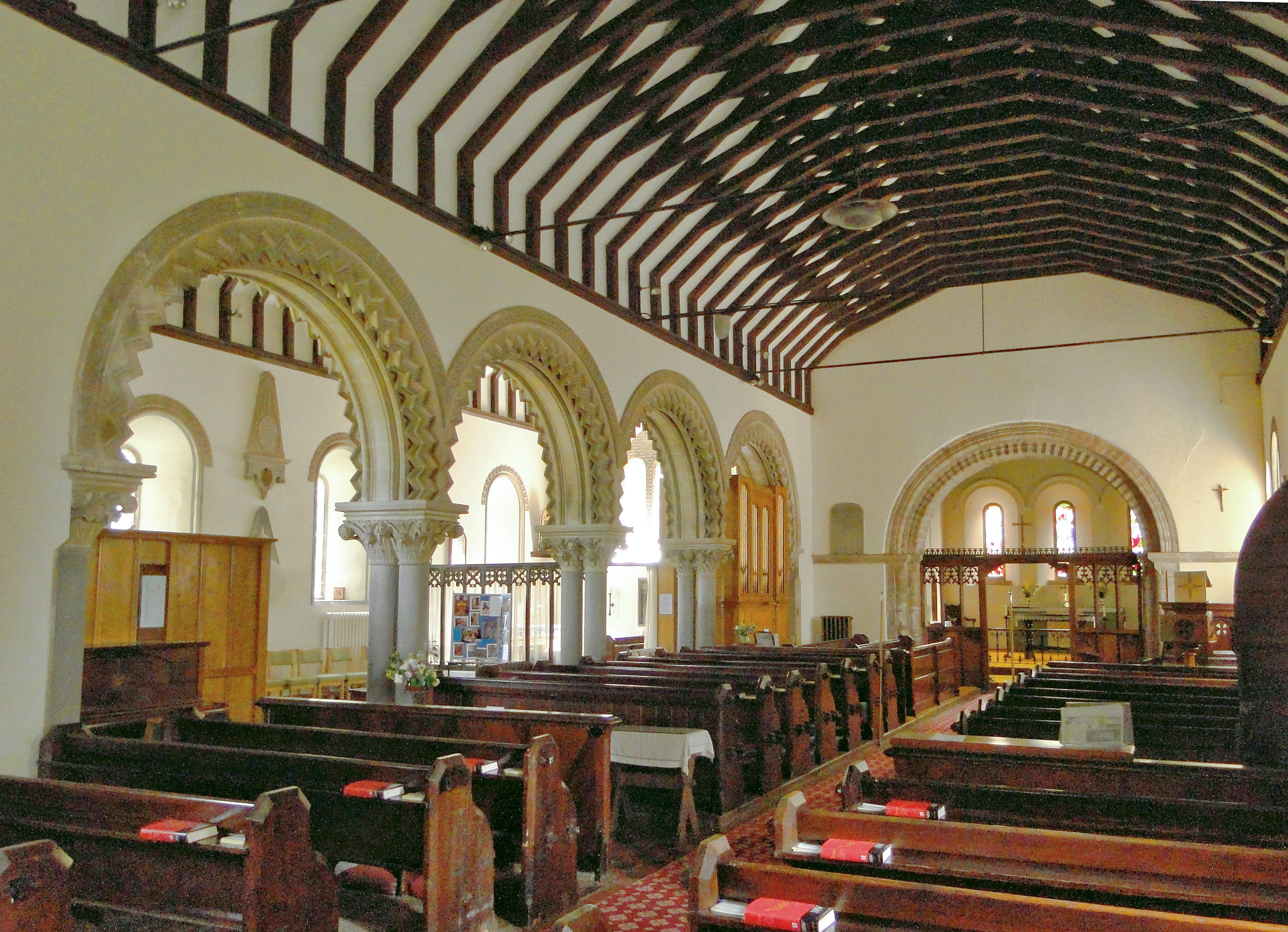
Interior, showing the north arcade and the chancel arch

The church is built of local sandstone. There is a nave with a north aisle; a chancel, narrower than the nave; a tower and a south porch. The earliest remaining parts, from the 12th century, are the chancel arch, which is semicircular and has two orders, the inner with chevron ornamentation; and the south doorway, which has a rounded arch of three orders. The nave, longer than the north aisle, was probably lengthened before the tower was built. The tower dates from the 14th century, and its height was augmented in the 15th century; it has three stages and an embattled parapet.

The chancel was rebuilt in 1847. The north aisle and nave were rebuilt in 1861 to 1862 by F. R. Kempson. The north arcade, of four bays, has rounded neo-Norman arches supported on pairs of columns with early-Gothic capitals.

=== Interior features ===
In the south wall of the nave there is a recess with a segmental arch and ball flower ornaments; it contains an effigy of a knight in a suit of mail, with crossed legs, holding a sword and shield, his feet resting on a lion. It dates from the 14th century. The font, of the 12th century, has a bowl 40 inches (1.0 m) in diameter, on a 19th-century stem and base. The rood screen, incorporating 16th-century work, has a central doorway and two side bays, with delicate tracery. The north chapel has a 16th-century screen and an 18th-century communion rail, brought from the former Munderfield chapel in 1980.
