= John Hopton (soldier) =

British sports shooter and soldier (1858–1934)

John Dutton Hopton
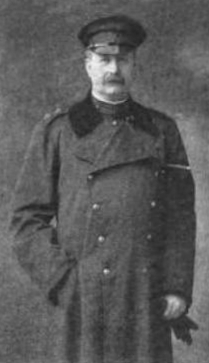
- In The Sketch, 18 July 1900

Personal information
- Birth name: John Dutton Hunt
- Nationality: English
- Born: 30 December 1858; Stroud, England
- Died: 1 June 1934 (aged 75); Herefordshire, England
- Height: 6 ft 6 in (198 cm)

Sport
- Country: Great Britain
- Sport: Sports shooting

Colonel John Hopton (born John Dutton Hunt; 30 December 1858 – 1 June 1934) was a British soldier, landowner, musician, and Olympic marksman.

== Biography ==
Educated at Harrow and the Royal Military College, Sandhurst, Hopton was commissioned into the British Army on 13 August 1879 as a second lieutenant in the Highland Light Infantry. He had a career in the Army Ordnance Department, and was Chief Inspector for Small Arms with the temporary rank of lieutenant-colonel from 1 October 1900. He received the substantive promotion to lieutenant-colonel on 29 October 1902. By 1908, he was on retired pay.

He was one of the greatest rifle shots of his day. He represented England 36 times in the Elcho long-range Match against Scotland and Ireland, and captained the Great Britain team both at home and on tour in Australia. At the age of 49, he competed in the 1000 yard free rifle event at the 1908 Summer Olympics, placing 24th. 1000 yard free rifle was not contested at any Olympic Games after 1908.

At the Imperial Meeting, held at Bisley, his name is given to the Hopton Aggregate, being the overall aggregate of each shooter's individual scores in the long-range discipline of Match Rifle.

Outside shooting, Hopton was an accomplished musician, serving as director of the Royal Academy of Music. In 1883 he married Harriette Mary Rudd Stevenson (1863–1939) but they Divorced in 1897 when she ran off with Claud Berkeley Portman (1864–1929) Later 4th Viscount Portman and in 1899 he married Sybil Maude.

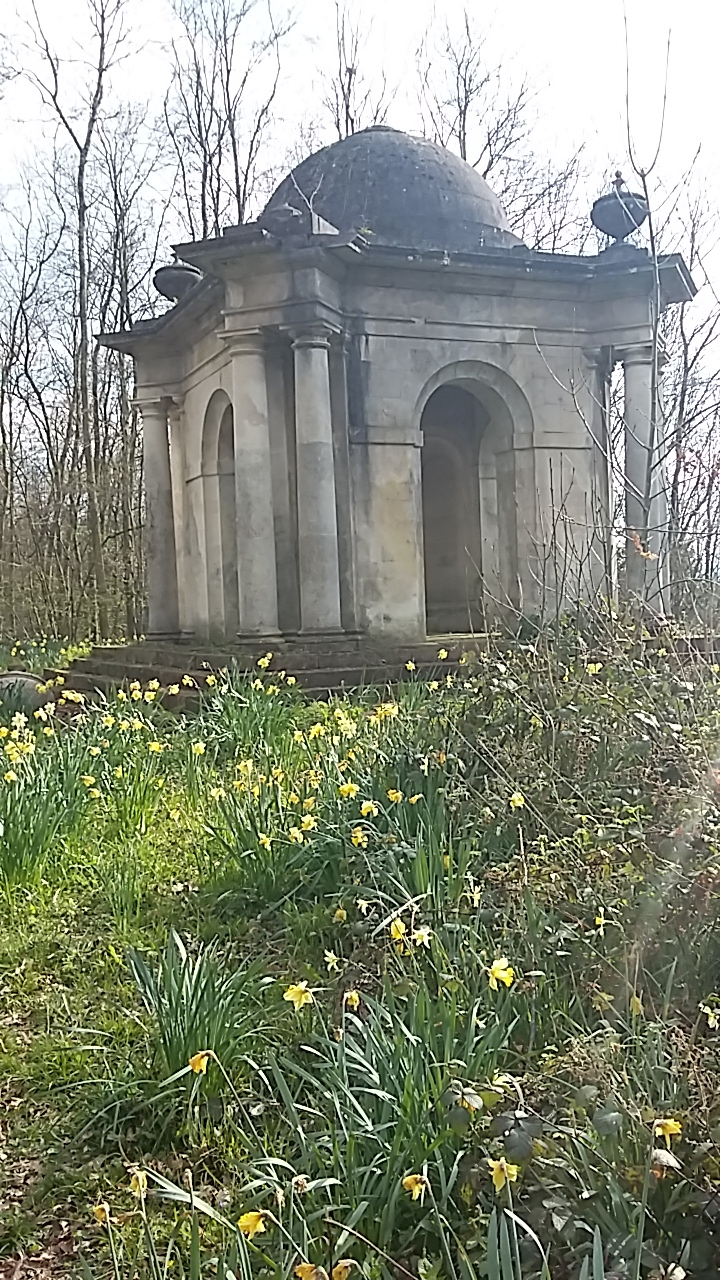
Hopton's mausoleum at Canon Frome

Hopton lived at Canon Frome Court, Herefordshire, his ancestral home, where he had a private rifle range. He is buried in an imposing tomb at the top of Meephill to the east of the parish of Canon Frome, taking the form of a stone classical temple with resonant musical qualities. The mausoleum marks the spot from which Hopton once hit the bulls-eye of a target 1,500 yards away, at Old Birchend.

Probate on Hopton's will was granted to his widow, Sybil Maude Hopton, on an estate valued at £96,194, equivalent to £8,626,034 in 2023.
