= Barnabas Scudamore =

English Royalist army officer (1609–1651/2)

Sir Barnabas Scudamore (1609–1651) was an English military commander and active Royalist during the English Civil War. The son of James Scudamore and younger brother of Viscount Scudamore, he was from a prominent Herefordshire landowning family. His family's seat was at Holme Lacy.

He led the attack that captured and wrecked Wilton Castle, the home of Sir John Brydges who then abandoned his former neutrality and joined the Parliamentary cause. After Hereford, the county town of the predominantly Royalist area, was briefly seized by William Waller in 1643 he was appointed Governor and began to rebuild its defences to make it a stronghold for the King. He replaced the previous governor there, Fitzwilliam Coningsby, whose family had a long-standing rivalry with the Scudamores. Scudamore's heavy-handed policies brought criticism of him.

== Siege of Hereford ==
Scudamore came to particular prominence as the Royalist Governor of Hereford in 1645. The same year, following the Parliamentarian victory at Battle of Naseby, he successfully defended the city during the Siege of Hereford from a large army of Scottish Covenanters allied to the English Parliament and commanded by the Earl of Leven. In reward for his service, he was knighted by Charles I.

Shortly afterwards however, the city was seized in a Coup de main by the Parliamentarian commander John Birch. Scudamore fled quickly, abandoning his post, and was accused of cowardice and then for taking a bribe to allow the city's fall. He rode to Worcester, still in Royalist hands, to defend himself but was imprisoned without trial for seven months as the King rejected his claim that it was his subordinate officers who were at fault. There were even false reports of his execution.

== Bibliography ==
- Atherton, Ian. Ambition and Failure in Stuart England: The Career of John, First Viscount Scudamore. Oxford University Press, 2004.
- Bennett, Martyn. The Civil Wars Experienced: Britain and Ireland, 1638–1661. London: Routledge, 2000.
- Hopper, Andre. Turncoats and Renegadoes: Changing Sides During the English Civil Wars. Oxford University Press, 2012.
- Rayner, Michael. English Battlefields: An Illustrated Encyclopaedia. Tempus, 2004.
- Rogers, Pat. The Life and Times of Thomas, Lord Coningsby: The Whig Hangman and His Victims. A&C Black, 2011.
- Wedgwood, Cicely Veronica. The Great Rebellion: The King's War, 1641-1647. Collins, 1958.
