= Wye Bridge, Hereford =

15th-century bridge in Hereford, England

Coordinates: 52°03′09″N 2°43′07″W

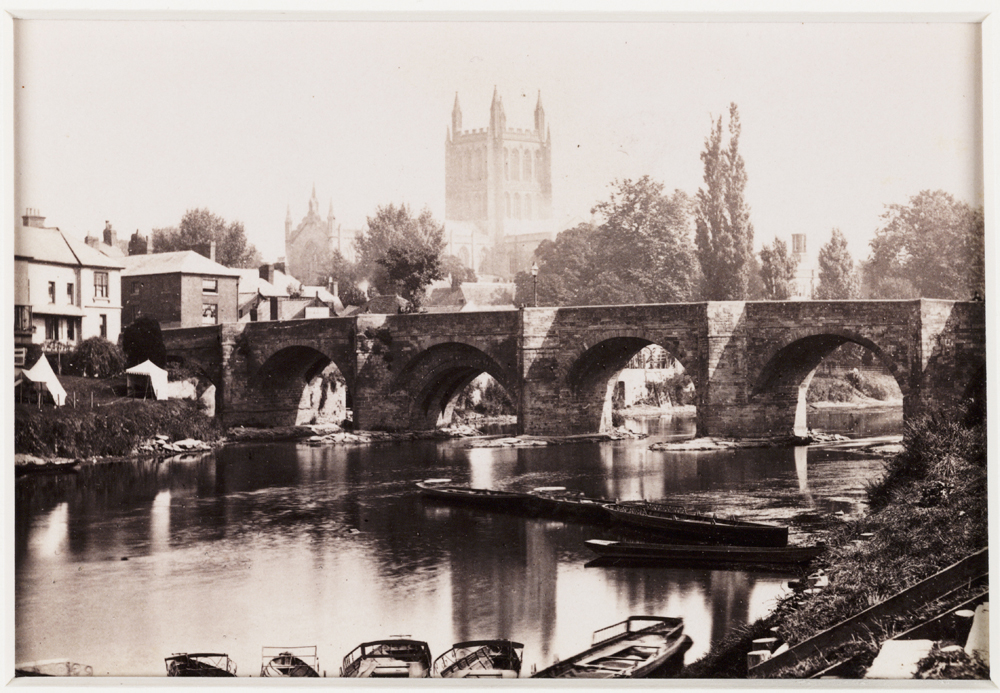
The bridge c. 1880 with Hereford Cathedral in the background

The Wye Bridge is a Grade I listed stone bridge in Hereford, the county town of Herefordshire in England. Spanning the River Wye, it was constructed in 1490 to replace an earlier timber bridge dating back to the twelfth century. During the 1645 Siege of Hereford in the English Civil War it was the scene of heavy fighting between the English Royalist defenders and the Scottish Covenanter besiegers. A gatehouse that stood on the site was severely damaged and was later demolished in the eighteenth century.

== Bibliography ==
- Foxton, Derek & Shoesmith, Ron. Hereford in 50 Buildings. Amberley Publishing Limited, 2019.
- Hurley, Heather. The Old Roads of South Herefordshire. Fineleaf Editions, 2007.
