= Halmond's Frome =

Coordinates: 52.1293°N 2.4760°W

Halmond’s Frome
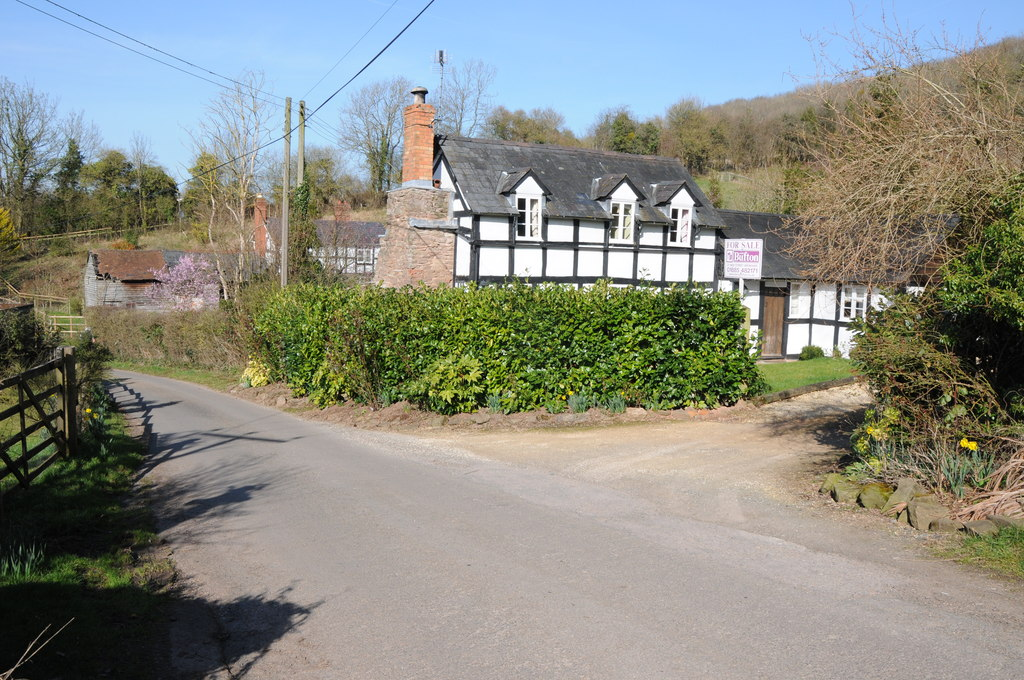
- Grade II timber-framed Ivy Cottage on Snail's Bank

- Location within Herefordshire
- OS grid reference: SO 675479
  - London: 110 mi (180 km) SE
- Unitary authority: Herefordshire
- Ceremonial county: Herefordshire
- Region: West Midlands
- Country: England
- Sovereign state: United Kingdom
- Post town: HEREFORD
- Postcode district: WR6
- Police: West Mercia
- Fire: Hereford and Worcester
- Ambulance: West Midlands
- UK Parliament: North Herefordshire

Halmond's Frome is a hamlet in the civil parish of Bishop's Frome in Herefordshire, England, and is 11 miles (18 km) north-east from the city and county town of Hereford. The closest town is the market town of Bromyard, 4.5 miles (7 km) to the north.

Halmond's Frome is at the west of the parish, and 300 yards (274 m) from the boundary with the parish of Evesbatch. The hamlet is centred on the junction of two minor roads: Snail's Bank, which runs from Bromyard at the north to the parish hamlet of Fromes Hill on the A4103 road 1 mile (1.6 km) at the south, and the road to the B124 road to Bishop's Frome village.

During the 19th century Halmond's Frome was one of the townships within the parish. By 1881 the parish townships (as opposed to the complete parish area), of Halmond's Frome, Bishop's Frome (village), Leadon, Walton, and Stanford Regis had a combined population of 727. Listed occupations of Halmond's Frome in 1885 included two shopkeepers, one farmer, and a beer retailer-cum-carrier, in a parish of clay soil producing wheat, beans, hops and fruit. A beer retailer was still listed in 1913, as was a shoe maker.

The hamlet comprises residential properties, a public house, a private guest house, and two farms, one with a hop kiln building. The 18th-century square hop kiln, red brick with twin pyramid slate roofs, is one of 14 Grade II listed buildings, another being the Major's Arms public house, originally a 17th-century cottage, with timber-framing with plaster infills, of one storey with attic, casement windows, a slate roof with gable ends, and a stone end stack.
