= Eggleton, West Virginia =

Unincorporated community in West Virginia, United States

Eggleton
- Unincorporated community
- Location within the state of West Virginia Eggleton (the United States)
- Coordinates: 38°17′35″N 82°1′14″W
- Country: United States
- State: West Virginia
- County: Putnam
- Elevation: 699 ft (213 m)
- Time zone: UTC-5 (Eastern (EST))
  - Summer (DST): UTC-4 (EDT)
- GNIS ID: 1549669

Eggleton is an unincorporated community in Putnam County, West Virginia, United States.
