= Siege of Hereford =

Part of the First English Civil War (1645)

Coordinates: 52.056°N 2.716°W

- Part of the First English Civil War
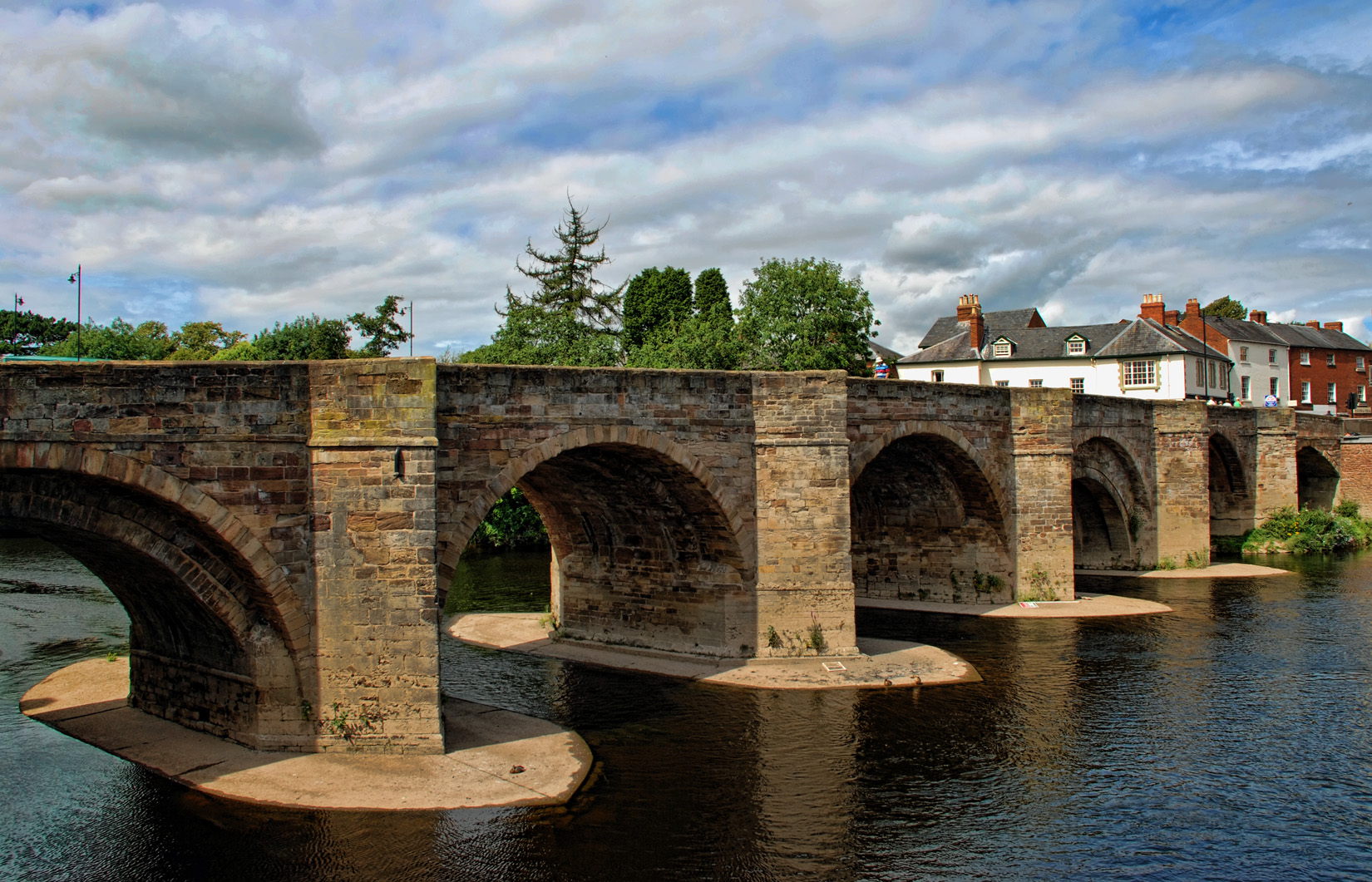
- The Bridge over the River Wye was the scene of heavy fighting during the siege.
Date	30 July – 4 September 1645
Location	Hereford, Herefordshire
Result	Royalist Victory

Belligerents
English Royalists	Scottish Covenanters

Commanders and leaders
Barnabas Scudamore	Earl of Leven; Lawrence Crawford †

Strength
1,500	14,000

Casualties and losses
Unknown	Unknown

The siege of Hereford took place in 1645 during the English Civil War when the city of Hereford and its English Royalist garrison was besieged by a Scottish Covenanter army under the command of the Earl of Leven. The Covenanters were allied to the English Parliamentarian cause and moved to take the Royalist stronghold in the wake of their victory at the Battle of Naseby. After a month-long siege, the approach of Royalist reinforcements and news of Montrose's victories against the Covenanters in Scotland forced Leven to abandon the siege and retreat. However, in December of the same year the city was taken in a surprise attack by Colonel John Birch and remained in Parliamentarian hands for the remainder of the conflict.

== Background ==
Hereford and the Welsh Marches were a major recruiting ground for the Royalist cause. After the city was briefly seized by Parliamentarian troops under William Waller in 1643, a prominent local man Barnabas Scudamore was appointed as Governor replacing Fitzwilliam Coningsby. Scudamore oversaw a dramatic improvement in Hereford's defences. While Hereford remained a bastion of Royalist power, increasing war weariness had led 15,000 clubmen to march to the gates of Hereford in the spring of 1645 before they were dispersed by Prince Rupert.

In 1645 the tide of the war turned decisively against Charles I and on 14 June he lost the Battle of Naseby in Northamptonshire to the English New Model Army. Charles retreated to Hereford and then into South Wales, hoping to rebuild his shattered army with Welsh recruits and Irish allies. Meanwhile, Scottish Covenanter forces under Leven captured Carlisle on 28 June and were then ordered by the Committee of Both Kingdoms to proceed via Alcester to attack Hereford and disrupt Royalist attempts to assemble a fresh army. After arriving at Hereford, Charles sent Rupert to take command at Bristol and retreated himself towards Cardiff via Abergavenny to begin recruiting.

== Siege ==
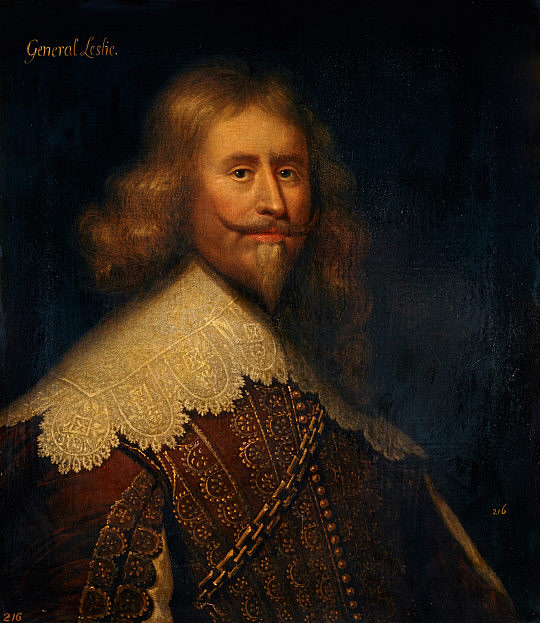
The Earl of Leven led the Scottish forces during the siege.

Leven's advance into Herefordshire brought him into conflict with the fortified manor house at Canon Frome near Ledbury, commanded by Colonel Sir John Barnard. After the Scottish forces stormed the place they massacred many of the defenders and executed Barnard. On reaching Hereford, Leven had around 14,000 troops under his command while Scudamore had 1,500 defenders. After an initial fight around the bridge over the River Wye, Leven offered terms to Scudamore but he rejected them as he could not surrender without the king's permission. Scudamore still hoped to receive relief from Charles in Wales. Leven kept very strict discipline amongst his men regarding looting.

Several major assaults were attempted on the city and in one of them, the Scottish Major General Lawrence Crawford was killed by a Royalist sniper. One of the city's churches, the medieval St Martin's, was severely damaged by the besiegers, and was not fully rebuilt until the Victorian era. Leven's conduct of the siege has been described as "overcautious".

Charles had gathered some fresh troops and was advancing slowly to assist the garrison at Hereford. More alarmingly for Leven came news of the victory for the Scottish Royalists and their allied Irish Brigade under the Marquis of Montrose at the Battle of Kilsyth. Leven abandoned the siege between 1–2 September and began to withdraw northwards intending to march to Scotland to aid his government against the Royalist threat. The King entered the city on 4 September, fully ending the siege. He knighted Scudamore for his successful defence of the city and then marched north to Chester hoping to link up with Montrose's forces.

== Aftermath ==
Within less than two weeks the Covenanters had won a striking victory over Montrose at the Battle of Philiphaugh in the Scottish Borders ending any chance that he could intervene in the English war. Prince Rupert had meanwhile surrendered Bristol and the Royalists ultimately gained little long-term benefit from the victory at Hereford. Leven's forces abandoned their return to Scotland and instead moved to attack Newark in Nottinghamshire which they eventually took after a lengthy siege.

The events of the siege were portrayed in Daniel Defoe's 1720 novel Memoirs of a Cavalier which was written from the point of view of one of the Royalist participants.

== Fall of Hereford ==
In December Parliamentary forces under John Birch and Thomas Morgan advanced rapidly on Hereford. On 18 December Birch launched a night attack on Hereford and carried it with surprise, capturing many of the garrison. After the fall of the city Scudamore was accused of having accepted a bribe to turn Hereford over to the king's enemies and was imprisoned for several months without trial in Worcester. Birch was appointed as the new Governor of the city. Hereford remained in Parliament's hands for the remainder of the First English Civil War, and also in the two subsequent conflicts in which the Scottish Covenanters invaded England in opposition to their former Parliamentarian allies.

== Bibliography ==
- Bennett, Martyn. Historical Dictionary of the British and Irish Civil Wars 1637–1660. Rowman & Littlefield, 2016.
- Grosjean, Alexia & Murdoch, Steve. Alexander Leslie and the Scottish Generals of the Thirty Years' War, 1618–1648. Routledge, 2015.
- Hopper, Andre. Turncoats and Renegadoes: Changing Sides During the English Civil Wars. Oxford University Press, 2012.
- Hutton, Ronald. The Royalist War Effort: 1642–1646. Routledge, 2003. Scarecrow Press, 2004.
- McRae, Alisdair. How the Scots Won the English Civil War: The Triumph of Fraser's Dragoons. The History Press, 2013.
- Manganiello, Stephen C. The Concise Encyclopedia of the Revolutions and Wars of England, Scotland, and Ireland, 1639–1660.
- Newman, P.R. Atlas of the English Civil War. Routledge, 2005.
- Reese, Peter. Cromwell's Masterstroke: Dunbar 1650. Pen and Sword, 2006.
- Rogers, Pat. The Life and Times of Thomas, Lord Coningsby: The Whig Hangman and His Victims. A&C Black, 2011.
- Stoyle, Mark. Soldiers and Strangers: An Ethnic History of the English Civil War. Yale University Press, 2005.
- Wilcher, Robert. Keeping the Ancient Way: Aspects of the Life and Work of Henry Vaughan (1621–1695). Oxford University Press, 2021.
