= Lucius Hunt =

Australian progressive rock band

- Origin: Brisbane, Australia
- Genres: Alternative rock, Progressive rock
- Years active: 2004 – present
- Labels: St Cecilia Records
- Members: Sean Hayter; Ryan Brown; Mark Eggleton; Dylan Bell
- Website: Lucius Hunt MySpace; Lucius Hunt Web Site

Lucius Hunt is an alternative Australian progressive rock band formed in late 2005. The band has four members: Sean Hayter (guitarist and lead vocalist), Ryan Brown (bassist and vocalist), Mark Eggleton (drums) and Dylan Bell (guitarist and keyboardist). The band hails from south of Brisbane, Queensland, and is recording their second album for the St. Cecilia Record label. The group released their first album titled Fear and Desire: The Conflict Within which contained 11 tracks in the later part of 2006.

== History ==
The group formed after the breakup of post-punk hardcore band in May 2005. Prior to this, the band operated as throughout 2004 and released an 8-track self-titled EP. zer0cold disbanded briefly as the members worked on solo projects and participated in other groups of similar standing. In mid-2005, all three members of zer0cold reformed to pick up where they left off, and renamed the group (sometimes referred to as ASD). After a series of events involving confusion with the name, ASD became Lucius Hunt in December 2005. Lucius Hunt is commonly known for brooding lyrics and a dark, haunting style and sound which typifies the group.

The band described itself on MySpace as "LUCIUS HUNT... a name that imitates and equals a dark sound and constant push forward to new levels for music. finding themselves basically sceneless, and with a style that morphs from rock to screamo they are appealing to a wide variety of the niche groups. with their inaugural release "fear and desire : the conflict within" in recording and due out early this year on st. cecilia records, LUCIUS HUNT is avidly preparing to tighten the noose around the throats of the industry. prepare for the wake...."

The album Fear and Desire: The Conflict Within was released September 2006 and was a success in the Australian Independent Music Charts, reaching number 3 during January 2007. The band subsequently toured the album nationally throughout 2007 with positive results. The band has since been working in the studio to the follow-up to "F&D," tentatively titled The Black Pegasus according to the band's MySpace page, however recently, the band has stated the album is yet to be titled.

The band's main songwriter, lead guitarist and lead vocalist, Sean Hayter, was inducted into Australasian Performing Right Association as an Australian Songwriter in November 2007, and has since provided music for a number of independent films and projects, including the Red Sparrow project.

== Members ==
Current members

- Sean Hayter – guitar, keys, vocals
- Ryan Brown – bass, vocals
- Mark Eggleton – drums
- Dylan Bell – guitar, keys

Former members

- Adam Bickford – bass, vocals
- Dion Ford – guitar

== Influences ==
Some of the influences listed by the band members on the official band web site include; Refused, Coheed and Cambria, Foo Fighters, Nirvana, Kyuss, The Mars Volta, Thursday, Between the Buried and Me, At the Drive-In, Sparta, Alexisonfire, Atreyu, Poison the Well, I Killed the Prom Queen, Weezer, The Blood Brothers, Boysetsfire, Thrice, My Chemical Romance, Muse, AFI, A Perfect Circle, Björk, Soundgarden, Rage Against the Machine, The Smashing Pumpkins, Killswitch Engage, The Dillinger Escape Plan and Dimmu Borgir among many others. The diversity of these influences has directly contributed to the band's original sound.

== Touring ==
Following the success of their 2006 album Fear and Desire: The Conflict Within, Lucius Hunt kicked off their UK tour by playing at Glasgow's famous King Tut's Wah Wah Hut, the venue where Oasis were discovered. The tour finished in London with a gig at the lesser known venue the Jamm in Brixton. It was here that Ryan Brown was hit by a missile launched from the crowd, resulting in brief treatment in a nearby ER.

Lucius Hunt toured the UK in April and May 2008, playing England, Wales and Scotland. Upon returning to Australia, the members of Lucius Hunt began work on the follow-up to the cult hit album "Fear and Desire" by recording at the Hairy Lemon Studios. The band is recording their second, currently untitled album.

== Discography ==
Note: This includes works created under the guise of zer0cold and A Static Dream.

=== Albums ===
- Fear and Desire: The Conflict Within (2006)

=== EPs ===
- zer0cold EP – as zer0cold (2004)
- Fear and Desire EP – as A Static Dream (2005)

=== Singles ===
- This Haunting (2006)
