= Eggleton, Herefordshire =

Civil parish in Herefordshire, England

Coordinates: 52°06′05″N 02°31′43″W

Eggleton (or Egleton) is a small civil parish in Herefordshire, England. Its main centres of population are Lower Eggleton and Upper Eggleton.

The parish is centred on the A4103 road between the cities of Hereford 8 miles (13 km) to the south-west and Worcester 15 miles (24 km) to the north-east. The parish shares Stretton Grandison Group Parish Council with the nearby parishes of Stretton Grandison, Castle Frome and Canon Frome.
