= Bishop's Frome Limestone =

The Bishop's Frome Limestone (or Bishops Frome Limestone) is a rock unit within the Raglan Mudstone Formation of the Old Red Sandstone occurring in the border region between England and South Wales. This limestone is a calcrete, that is to say it originated as a soil during a break in deposition rather than being an original marine deposit. It is perhaps the most significant of all of the calcretes which occur within the uppermost Silurian and lower Devonian sequence of rocks which constitute the Old Red Sandstone of the Anglo-Welsh Basin. It defines the boundary within the basin between the Silurian and the Devonian periods. The rock was formerly known as the Psammosteus Limestone after a characteristic fossil fish recorded in association with it; Psammosteus anglicus. The fossil remains were subsequently shown to have been wrongly identified and belong in fact to Traquairaspis symondsi. The name derives from the Herefordshire village of Bishop's Frome. The British Geological Survey has more recently redesignated it as the Chapel Point Limestone member, after a locality in Pembrokeshire where it also occurs. Its thickness is variable ranging from 2m up to 8m.
