= Bishop's Frome =

Village in Herefordshire, England

Coordinates: 52.1342°N 2.4969°W

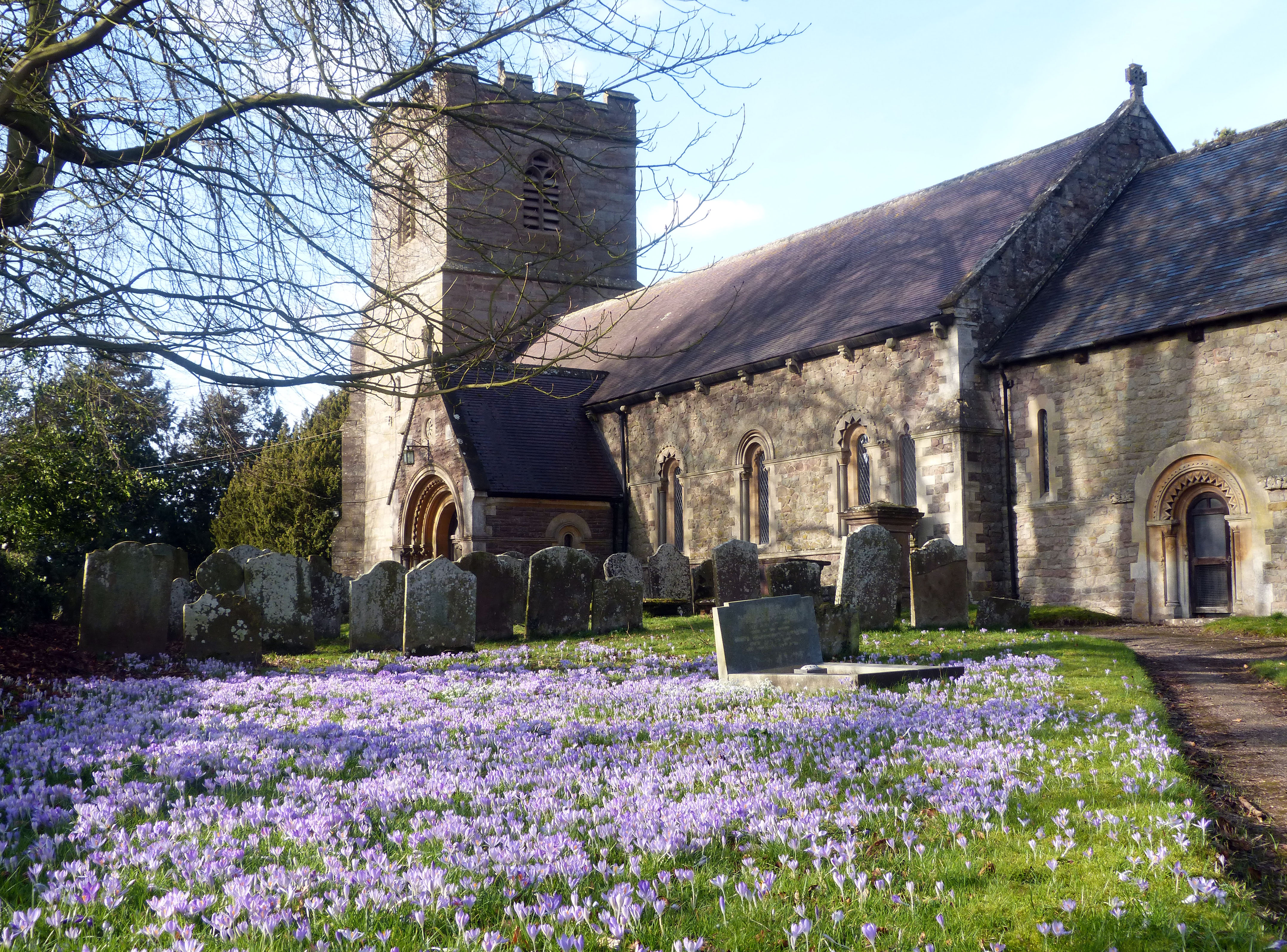
- St Mary's Church

- Location within Herefordshire
- Population: 806 (2021 census)
- OS grid reference: SO660485
- Civil parish: Bishop's Frome
- Unitary authority: County of Herefordshire
- Ceremonial county: Herefordshire
- Region: West Midlands
- Country: England
- Sovereign state: United Kingdom
- Post town: WORCESTER
- Postcode district: WR6
- Police: West Mercia
- Fire: Hereford and Worcester
- Ambulance: West Midlands
- UK Parliament: North Herefordshire

Bishop's Frome (or Bishops Frome) is a village and civil parish in eastern Herefordshire, England. The village is 11 miles (18 km) north-east of the city and county town of Hereford, 8 miles (13 km) west of Malvern and 4 miles (6 km) south of Bromyard. The civil parish includes the hamlets of Halmond's Frome and Fromes Hill.

The River Frome flows north to south through the parish and at the eastern edge of the village. Local agriculture includes the growing of hops and cider apples. Within the parish is a cider making company and a wine making business. Bishop's Frome gives its name to the Bishop's Frome Limestone which outcrops locally. Parish population at the 2021 census was 806. Although the parish is in Herefordshire, its mail is handled in Worcester and its outward postcode is WR6.

St Mary's parish church at the south of the village is approached through a lychgate. The church contains a font over 700 years old, and a memorial depicting the carved figure of a knight in armour, sword in hand and a lion at his feet.
