= Alexander Leslie, 1st Earl of Leven =

Scottish army officer (c. 1580 – 1661)

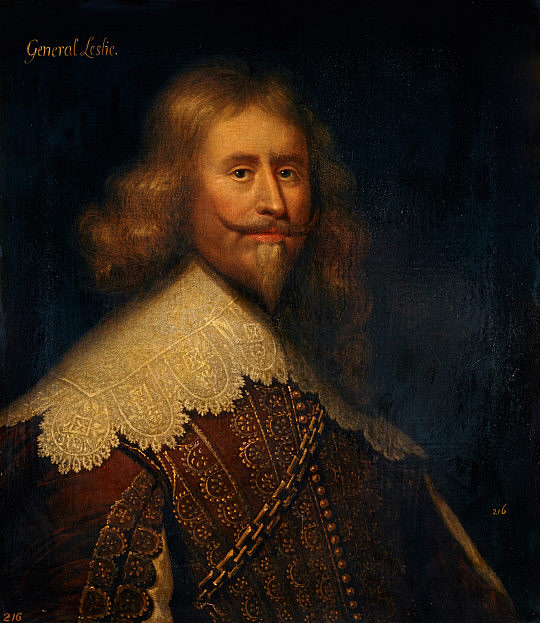
- Born: c. 1580
- Died: 4 April 1661 (aged 80–81); Balgonie Castle, Fife, Scotland
- Spouse: Agnes Renton (died c. 1651)
- Children: Gustavus; Alexander; Barbara; Christian; Anne; Margaret; Mary
- Military career
- Allegiance: Covenanter Scotland; Kingdom of Scotland; Swedish Empire
- Service years: c. 1605 – 1647
- Rank: Field Marshal (Sweden); Lord General of the Army of the Covenant (Scotland); Lord General of the Army of Both Kingdoms (Scotland and England)
- Commands: Army of the Weser; Army of Both Kingdoms; Army of the Solemn League and Covenant
- Conflicts: Thirty Years' War: Siege of Stralsund; Battle of Lützen; Battle of Wittstock; Bishops' Wars: Siege of Edinburgh Castle; Battle of Newburn; English Civil War: First English Civil War; Siege of Newcastle; Battle of Boldon Hill; Siege of York; Battle of Marston Moor; Siege of Carlisle; Second English Civil War; Whiggamore Raid

Alexander Leslie, 1st Earl of Leven (c. 1580 – 4 April 1661) was a Scottish army officer. Born illegitimate and raised as a foster child, he subsequently advanced to the rank of field marshal in the Swedish Army and a major leader of the Thirty Years' War, and in Scotland became Lord General in command of the Army of the Covenanters, a privy councillor, captain of Edinburgh Castle, Lord Balgonie and Earl of Leven. In England he commanded the Army of the Solemn League and Covenant and was senior commander of the Army of Both Kingdoms (1642–1647). Leslie served in the Thirty Years' War, the Bishops' Wars, and most of the English Civil War, fighting primarily in the First English Civil War. Leslie would live a long life, dying roughly at the age of 80 or 81.

== Early life ==
Alexander Leslie was born circa 1580 as an illegitimate son of George Leslie, a captain of Blair Castle, and a mother sometimes described as "a wench in Rannoch". He was a member of the Clan Leslie.

At an early age, Alexander was fostered out to the Campbells of Glenorchy. The fosterage bond was strong and still written about by Leslie into the 1640s. Indeed, it was this link that brought Leslie into the orbit of the House of Argyll as Lord Lorne, the son of the marquis of Argyll was also a Glenorchy fosterling. This relationship perhaps explains the presence of Campbells in the same regiments as Leslie in Sweden, most notably Captain Charles Campbell (Karl Kammel), whose portrait hangs to this day in Skokloster Castle in Sweden.

== Foreign service ==
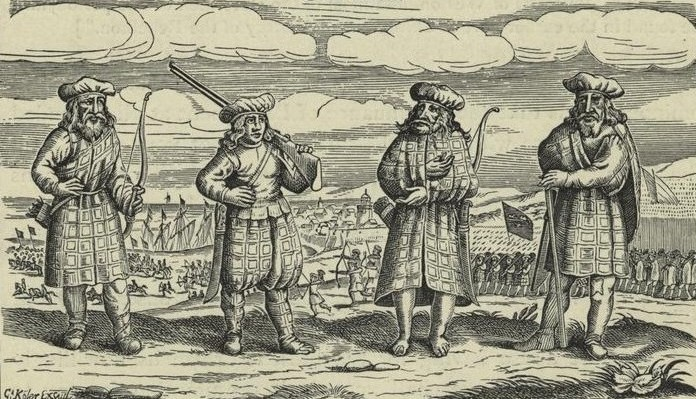
Men of Mackay's Regiment in the service of Gustavus Adolphus during the Thirty Years' War

=== Dutch service ===
It is sometimes claimed that Alexander Leslie entered Dutch service in 1605, and eventually attained the rank of captain in the Dutch States Army. However, this remains speculated and disputed between many historians.

=== Swedish service ===
In 1608, he transferred to the Swedish army where he served with distinction. In 1627 the Swedish monarch knighted Alexander Leslie, by now a full colonel, along with three of his countrymen; Patrick Ruthven, David Drummond and John Hepburn. Gustavus Adolphus had a particular affection for him, trusting him with guarding the crucial strategic garrisons in North Germany while the main Swedish army established a foothold on the Baltic shoreline and advanced slowly southwards. In 1628, Leslie was appointed governor during the Siege of Stralsund, replacing Colonel Alexander Seaton and the Scottish regiment of Donald Mackay who had been holding the town on behalf of the Danes. Leslie continued the defence of Stralsund successfully defending the town against Albrecht von Wallenstein's imperial army in what effectively constituted Sweden's entrance into the Thirty Years' War, Gustavus Adolfus also sending eight warships to help raise the siege. In 1630 he seized the island of Rügen in the name of the king of Sweden.

In 1631, Leslie organized English and Scottish troops raised for the Swedish army by James Hamilton, 1st Duke of Hamilton, then the 3rd Marquis of Hamilton, and was promoted Major-General. Leslie was badly wounded in February 1632 near Hamburg. Despite his injury, Leslie was present at the Battle of Lützen (1632). He was appointed Sweden's 13th Field Marshal in 1636 and was one of the Swedish commanders at the Battle of Wittstock in that same year. The overall commander, however, is said by some Swedish historians to have been Johan Banér; but at the time the two commanders had held equal rank: Banér commanding the Swedish Crown Army and Leslie commanding the Army of the Weser. The spectacular victory, however, was largely the work of Leslie and his subordinate, a fellow Scotsman, Lieutenant-General James King, a fact related by Banér himself in his report of the battle to Axel Oxenstierna and the other contemporary reports of the battle.

Leslie was furious with Banér and in his own account of the battle implies there had been a dispute about the tactics for the day. As it was, Leslie was forced to sacrifice many of his veteran troops in the process of saving Banér's men from being routed. Leslie intimated to Oxenstierna that he would stand down from Swedish service but was persuaded to remain and restructure the Army of the Weser. However, by 1637, Leslie was in Scotland preparing the way for his final retirement from Swedish service. He cherished his old commander's memory to the day of his death, and he kept with particular care a jewel and miniature presented to him by the king.

== Return to Scotland ==
=== Bishops' Wars ===
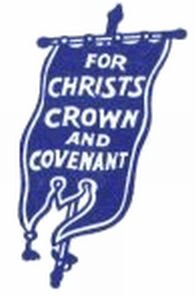
Traditional "Blue Banner" insignia used by Reformed Presbyterian Churches

In 1638, events in his native country again compelled him to return to Scotland, where he was appointed "Lord General" in command of the Army of the Covenant by the Scottish administration, and as such participated in the Bishops' Wars. Scottish regiments were generally called into service by the lairds and clan chieftains obliging their tenants with feudal duty or coercion to send their kin into battle. However, support among the Presbyterians of Scotland was widespread and the Covenanters' army swelled to over 20,000 men. From 1639 they rallied under a flag bearing the motto "For Christ's Crown and Covenant". Most of the officers of the Army of the Covenant were veterans of Swedish service brought home from the continental wars to form Scotland's first professional army. This took place after careful negotiations in the Swedish Riksråd (state council) during which Leslie worked behind the scenes to ensure Chancellor Axel Oxenstierna allowed up to 300 officers to be decommissioned along with an unknown number of ordinary soldiers. He was also able to bring from Sweden his arrears of pay in the form of cannon and muskets as "parting gifts" and these were transported for him on Swedish naval vessels. The payment arrangement meant that the Swedes could claim that they were not supporting rebellion in Scotland, only paying off a debt.

One of his first actions was to lead an army of some 6,000 soldiers to Aberdeen to reduce the largely Royalist town. On his departure on 12 April Leslie left the Marquis of Montrose in charge. Leslie's reputation, guile and discretion were frequently noted by contemporary observers including the English officer John Aston and intellectual, Sir Cheney Culpeper, who both commented on his qualities in their writings. His reputation was well earned and he took Edinburgh Castle without the loss of a single man. He had also by now amassed a considerable fortune and was able to live in a manner befitting a commander-in-chief, even when in the field. In the First Bishops' War, Leslie marched his army to Dunse Law where he encamped and awaited the arrival of the Royalist forces. Rather than fight them when they arrived, Leslie invited the Royalist officers to dinner before allowing them to inspect his army. Having seen they were out-classed by the Army of the Covenant, the Royalists chose to retire rather than to engage Leslie's superior forces. In the Second Bishops' War, Leslie conducted a brilliant campaign in the North of England, overwhelming the Royalists at the Battle of Newburn. From there he took Newcastle with ease putting pressure on the King to come to a treaty with the Scottish Covenanters. Thus followed the treaty of London.

In 1641 King Charles I in reward for his extraordinary military achievements at home and abroad appointed Leslie to the Scottish Privy Council and bestowed upon him, at Holyrood, the titles of Lord Balgonie and Earl of Leven, and made him captain of Edinburgh Castle. His affirmations of loyalty to the crown, which later events caused to be remembered against him, were sincere enough, but the complicated politics of the time made it difficult for Leslie, as lord general of the Scottish army, to maintain consistent policies.

A little later, Leven used his influence in support of a proposal to raise a Scottish army to help the Elector palatine in Germany, but the Ulster massacres gave this force, when raised, a fresh direction and Leven himself accompanied it to Ireland as lord general. He did not remain there long, for the Civil War had begun in England, and negotiations were opened between the English and the Scottish parliaments for mutual armed assistance.

=== Solemn League and Covenant ===
Leven eventually accepted command of the forces raised for the intervention in England on behalf of the English Parliament. He rose to become a commander of the Covenanter Army between 1644 and 1647 and fought for the Solemn League and Covenant, which bound both the Scottish and English parliaments together against the Royalist forces in the Three Stuart Kingdoms.

In 1644, Leven commanded the Army of the Solemn League and Covenant as it marched to England to take part in the unsuccessful Siege of York, before participating in the Battle of Marston Moor as senior commander of the allied Army of Both Kingdoms which included the two English parliamentary armies led respectively by Ferdinando Fairfax and the Earl of Manchester. Under Leven's command these forces inflicted a crushing defeat on the Royalists under Prince Rupert. The allied army then invested and captured York which surrendered within a fortnight. Later in the year Newcastle also fell after a spectacular siege and storm campaign. In 1645 after his English Allies won a victory at Battle of Naseby, he marched to take the Royalist city of Hereford but his siege was unsuccessful against the local commander Barnabas Scudamore. When Charles I surrendered to the Army of the Solemn League and Covenant at Newark in 1646, he was placed under the charge of Leven. As part of the negotiation for the Army of the Solemn League to leave England, Leven transferred the king to his Presbyterian allies unaware that these would soon lose power to the Independents. Nevertheless, Leven remained in control of Northern England and only agreed to relinquish his garrisons there when back-pay owing to his troops had been paid. The final instalment of this came in January 1647 after which Leven marched his army back across the Scottish border.

With the demise of the Army of the Solemn League and Covenant, Leven retired from active military command. Splits within the Scottish Parliament saw the Royalist Engager party led by James, 3rd Marquis Hamilton oust the Argyll radicals. Leven and his subordinate David Leslie, both declined command of this army. Hamilton led an ill-supported army over the border in support of the king. They were soundly defeated by English parliamentary forces at the Battle of Preston in 1648. This led to the return of the Argyll faction in Scotland after the Whiggamore Raid. After the execution of Charles I, Argyll declared his son, Charles II, King of Great Britain and Ireland leading to the Cromwellian invasion of Scotland. The Covenanters were defeated (1650) at the battle of Dunbar.

=== Afterward ===
In the new war, and in the disastrous campaign of Dunbar, Leven took no part despite officially being Lord General. Actual field command fell to David Leslie who failed to control his infantry and lost the battle in consequence. Leven took only a nominal part, though attempts were afterwards made to hold him responsible. But once more the parliament refused to accept his resignation.

In August 1651 Leven was captured in the town of Alyth by a group of Cromwellian dragoons in an incident known as 'the Onfall of Alyth', and was sent to London. He was confined to the Tower of London for some time, until he was released on providing a bond of £20,000, whereupon he retired to Northumberland. Sometime later in London he was arrested for a second time, but negotiations involving Queen Christina of Sweden obtained him his liberty, and he was finally freed from his engagements in 1654.

In one of his final military acts, Leven helped his son-in-law, Colonel William Cranston, to raise troops for Swedish service largely drawn from Scottish prisoners of war. These fought in Poland in the Toruń campaign.

He died in 1661 at Balgonie Castle, Fife, Scotland.

== Family ==
Alexander Leslie was married to Agnes Renton (died 29 June 1651, daughter of David Renton of Billie in Berwickshire). They had two sons and five daughters: Gustavus, who apparently died young, Alexander (2nd Lord Balgonie), Barbara, Christian, Anne, Margaret and Mary. Barbara married General Sir John Ruthven (not Patrick Ruthven as often stated). Alexander, his eldest son and namesake, became a colonel in the Swedish Army. In 1636 Lord Balgonie married daughter of John Leslie, Earl of Rothes. Young Leslie later followed his father into service in the Army of the Solemn League and Covenant, commanding Leven's lancers and cavalry on the right wing at the battle of Marston Moor. He pre-deceased his father.

== Nursery rhyme and song ==
The nursery rhyme "There Was a Crooked Man" is allegedly about Sir Alexander Leslie:

There was a crooked man and he walked a crooked mile,

He found a crooked sixpence upon a crooked stile.

He bought a crooked cat, which caught a crooked mouse.

And they all lived together in a little crooked house.

The song "General Lesley's March" is said to have been sung by Scottish soldiers during the wars of the Covenant in the 1640s, though it is more likely to be a mockery of the Covenanters:

When to the kirk we come,

We'll purge it ilka room,

Frae popish relics, and a' sic innovation,

That a' the world may see,

There's nane in the right but we,

Of the auld Scottish nation.

== See also ==
- Clan Leslie
- Scotland and the Thirty Years' War

== Sources ==
- Ailes, Mary Elizabeth (2002). Military migration and state formation: the British military community in seventeenth-century Sweden. University of Nebraska Press. ISBN 0-8032-1060-4.
- Furgol, Edward (1990). A Regimental History of the Scottish Covenanting Armies, 1639–1651. Edinburgh.
- Furgol, Edward (2002). "Beating the Odds: Alexander Leslie's 1640 Campaign in England". In Murdoch, Steve; Mackillop, Andrew (eds.). Fighting for Identity: Scottish Military Experience c. 1550–1900. Leiden. pp. 33–59.
- Grosjean, Alexia (2002). "Royalist Soldiers and Cromwellian Allies?: The Cranstoun Regiment in Sweden, 1655–1658". In Murdoch, Steve; Mackillop, Andrew (eds.). Fighting for Identity: Scottish Military Experience c. 1550–1900. Leiden. pp. 61–85.
- Grosjean, Alexia (2003). An Unofficial Alliance: Scotland and Sweden, 1569–1654. Leiden. pp. passim.
- Grosjean, Alexia; Murdoch, Steve (2007). "The Riksråd Debates, 1638–1640 (Documents 117 & 118)". In Erskine, C.; MacDonald, A.R.; Penman, M. (eds.). Scotland: The Making and Unmaking of the Nation, c. 1100–1707. Major Documents. Vol. 5. Dundee. pp. 214–223.
- Murdoch, Steve (2006). Network North: Scottish Kin, Commercial and Covert Associations in Northern Europe, 1603–1746. Leiden. pp. 17–18, 39–48, 233, 356–357.
- Murdoch, Steve; Grosjean, Alexia (2014). Alexander Leslie and the Scottish Generals of the Thirty Years' War, 1618–1648. London.
- Murdoch, Steve; Zickermann, Kathrin; Marks, Adam (2012). "The Battle of Wittstock 1636: Conflicting Reports on a Swedish Victory in Germany". Northern Studies. 43: 71–109.
- "There was a Crooked Man rhyme". Nursery Rhymes lyrics, origins and history.
- Paul, Sir James Balfour (1904–1911). The Scots Peerage. Vol. v (8 vols. ed.). Edinburgh. pp. 373, 383–384.
- Stevenson, David (October 2007). "Leslie, Alexander, first earl of Leven (c. 1580–1661)". Oxford Dictionary of National Biography (online ed.). Oxford University Press. doi:10.1093/ref:odnb/16482. (Subscription, Wikipedia Library access or UK public library membership required.)

Peerage of Scotland
New creation	Earl of Leven; 1641–1661	Succeeded by Alexander Leslie
