= Fromes Hill =

Hamlet in Herefordshire, England

Coordinates: 52.116°N 2.467°W

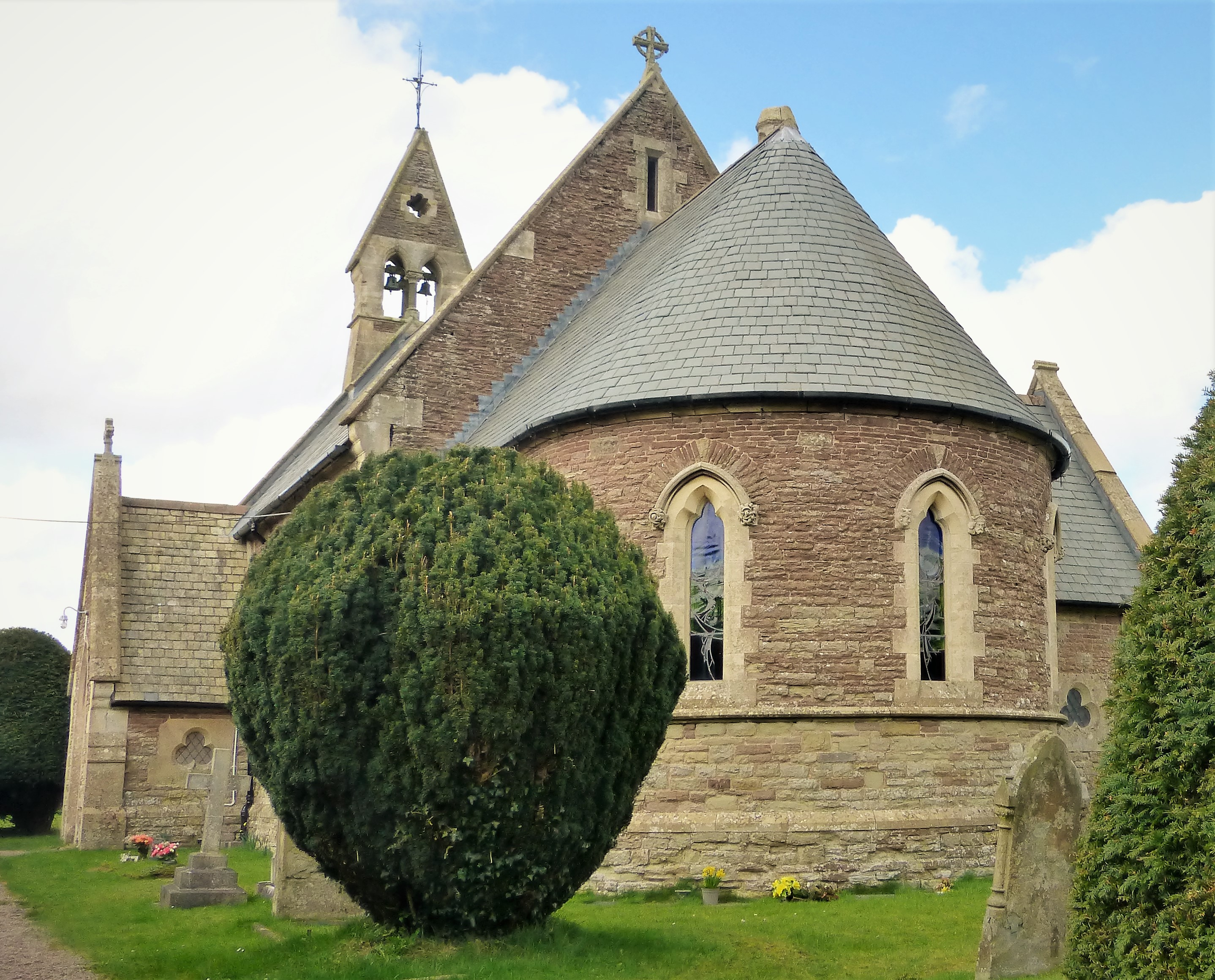
St Matthew's Church

Location of Fromes Hill in Herefordshire

Fromes Hill is a hamlet in the civil parish of Bishop's Frome, in Herefordshire, England, and is about 15 miles (24 km) east from the city and county town of Hereford, 7 miles (11 km) north from Ledbury and 18 miles (29 km) west from Worcester.

The hamlet is a linear settlement, with most residences along the main A4103 road, or to its side. Local agriculture includes apples (cider), wheat, grains and hops. The local church is dedicated to St Matthew. Businesses include a pub, an Indian restaurant, those part of a trading estate in which is displayed a T34 tank, and a vineyard which produces cider.

Fromes Hill postcode is HR8. The population is around 350.

== Fromes Hill Hillclimb ==
From 1904 to 1907 Fromes Hill was the location of an international hill climb.

- On 30 August 1904, the main event was won by E.V. Fielder, who averaged 11.8 mph in his Wolseley 6 hp.
- On 17 June 1905 the event was run over a 1,289-yard course and was won by M.H. Orr-Ewing, driving a Daimler 28/36 hp.
- On 24 May 1906 the Frome's Hill, "Open" event used the 1,289-yard course and was won by a Daimler 30/40 hp.
- On 3 May 1907 the 1289 yard "Open" was won by a Daimler 35 hp.
- In possibly another 1907 event the Fastest Time of the Day was set by Algernon Lee Guinness (ALG) driving his 1905 Darracq model 200 which was equipped with a 25,422cc V8 engine and had been designed for an attempt on the Land Speed Record.
