= Stretton Grandison =

Hamlet in Herefordshire, England

Coordinates: 52.09°N 2.54°W

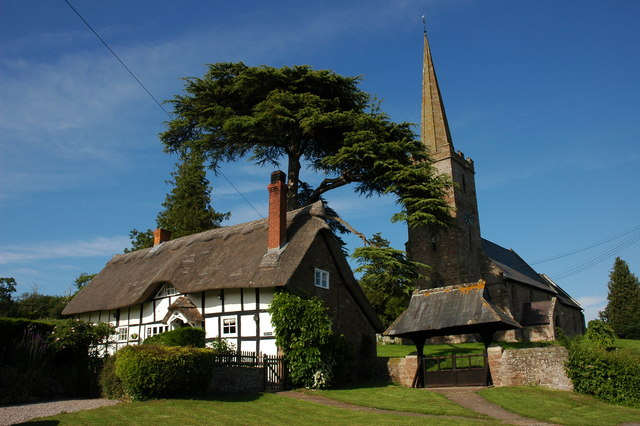
- St Lawrence's Church

- Location within Herefordshire
- Population: 175 (2011 Census)
- Unitary authority: Herefordshire
- Shire county: Herefordshire
- Region: West Midlands
- Country: England
- Sovereign state: United Kingdom
- Post town: Ledbury
- Postcode district: HR8
- Police: West Mercia
- Fire: Hereford and Worcester
- Ambulance: West Midlands
- UK Parliament: North Herefordshire

Stretton Grandison is a hamlet and small civil parish in Herefordshire, England. The population of the civil parish at the 2011 census was 175.

It is on the A417 road (a Roman Road, hence the settlement's name "Stretton") to the north-east of Hereford. The River Frome flows along the parish's southern boundary.

The Church of St Lawrence, dating from its 14th-century rebuilding of an earlier church, is a Grade I listed building.
