= Frances Stackhouse Acton =

British botanist, archaeologist and artist (1794–1881)

- Born: Frances Knight; 7 July 1794; Elton Hall, Herefordshire, England
- Died: 24 January 1881 (aged 86); Acton Scott, Shropshire, England
- Other name: Fanny Knight
- Occupations: Botanist, archaeologist, writer, artist
- Known for: Excavation of Roman villa at Acton Scott; Botanical illustrations in Pomona Herefordiensis; Restoration of Stokesay Castle; Author of The Castles & Old Mansions of Shropshire
- Spouse: Thomas Pendarves Stackhouse
- Relatives: Thomas Andrew Knight (father)
- Honors: Donations to Royal Geological Society of Cornwall; contributions to botanical and archaeological societies

Frances Stackhouse Acton (née Knight; 7 July 1794 – 24 January 1881) was a British botanist, archaeologist, writer and artist. Her father was noted botanist, Thomas Andrew Knight, who encouraged her education and included her in his experiments. She married an older land owner and, as they had no children, when he died she pursued her own interests, which included archaeology and architecture. She excavated a Roman villa, built a number of buildings and saved others in need of repair. She was keen on painting buildings and eventually went on to publish a charitable book, The Castles & Old Mansions of Shropshire.

== Early life ==
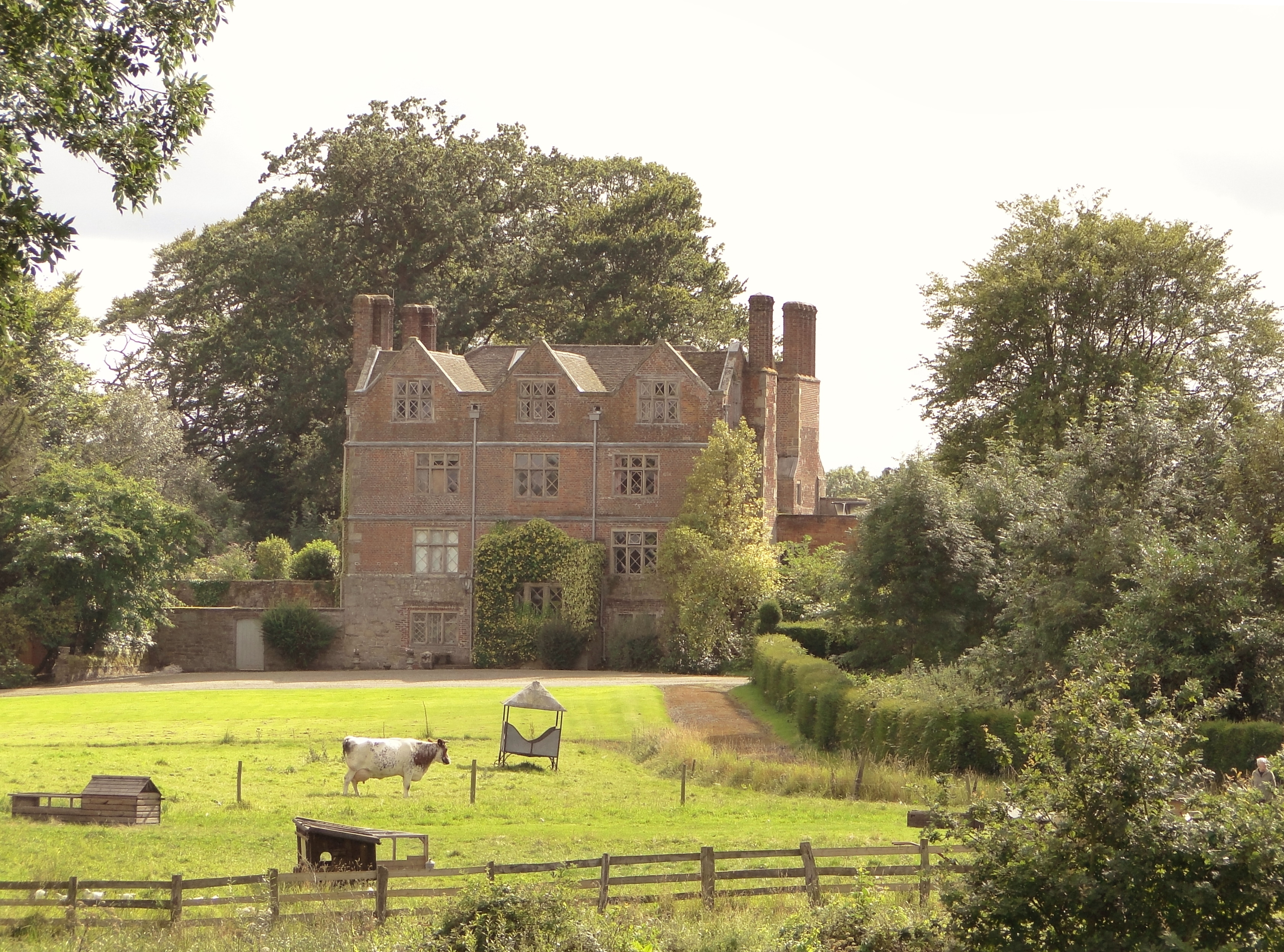
Acton Scott Hall, where Frances Stackhouse Acton spent the majority of her life

Stackhouse Acton was born Frances Knight, better known as Fanny, on 7 July 1794 in Elton Hall near Elton, Herefordshire. Her parents were Thomas Andrew Knight, a noted botanist, and his wife Frances Knight, whose family owned the Elton estate. She was the eldest daughter of the family, with two sisters, Elizabeth and Charlotte Knight, along with a brother, Thomas. Around 1808, her family moved to Downton Castle in Herefordshire, which had been built by her great-grandfather, Richard and was owned by her uncle Richard Payne Knight. Her father strongly encouraged her and her siblings' education, and she is quoted as remembering "the hours spent with him in his study, or in his garden, as amongst the happiest recollections".

In January 1812 when she was 18, she married the 43-year-old Thomas Pendarves Stackhouse in Old Downton Church in Downton. The couple moved into Acton Scott Hall, which was owned by Stackhouse's mother, though it was in a poor condition. Thomas Stackhouse inherited Acton Scott Hall from his mother when she died in 1834, and the couple became Mr. and Mrs. Stackhouse Acton. Her husband died the following year and as the couple had no children, Stackhouse Acton inherited his estate.

== Interests ==
Frances Stackhouse Acton's husband died when she was just 40 years old. She had no children, and was free to follow her interests. These included diverse memberships in societies, such as archery or anti-vivisection or making donations of Silurian rocks to the Royal Geological Society of Cornwall.

=== Botany ===
Stackhouse Acton was encouraged into botany by her father, who included her in his horticultural experiments in the grounds Downton Castle. She illustrated two of her fathers publications including three illustrations in Pomona Herefordiensis and, seventy years later, jointly contributed to apple drawings in Herefordshire Pomona. She was regarded to be an "accomplished botanist and botanical artist", who influenced her cousins Emily and Charlotte to paint botanical subjects.

=== Archaeology ===
A Roman villa was discovered in the grounds of Acton Scott Hall. In 1844, Stackhouse Acton excavated the villa, along with numerous other Roman remains, writing about the project in detail to the Dean of Hereford. The building appeared to be a 31 metres long and 12.5 metres wide aisled barn which was converted into a house, including rooms heated by a hypocaust, probably a bath house. Stackhouse Acton drew up plans of the villa which included details of the hypocaust heating system. Later, she went on to reconstruct part the villa's hypocaust system in a nearby quarry. A 2009 investigation found evidence of the villa, but not in the precise location that Stackhouse Acton had described.

=== Buildings ===
Stackhouse Acton's primary interest lay in buildings. She would frequently paint historical buildings such as abbeys and stately homes, often leaving the people or animals in the image unfinished. She repaired a significant number of cottages on her estate and built a school. She also created a secret garden in the quarry where she had built the hypocaust system. Near to the secret garden, she built a Swiss-style chalet. Stackhouse Acton also spent some time updating Acton Scott Hall, replacing and extending windows, as well as bringing in some 17th-century woodwork.

She took a particular interest in Stokesay Castle, which had fallen into disrepair by the first half of the 19th century. In 1853 she convinced the owner, William Craven, 2nd Earl of Craven, to pay to restore it under her supervision. The cost was over £100 (worth approximately £70,980 in 2015). (Note: Comparing average earnings on a project between 1853 and 2015, £100 is valued at approximately £70,980 by MeasuringWorth.com) Although she managed to "clear out and secure" the castle, she did not succeed in countering the dilapidation and eventually the castle was sold.

=== Writings ===
When her father died, his family had many requests to publish his complete works. Stackhouse Acton compiled a collection of his papers and wrote a short biography in "Sketch of his life" in the introduction. Stackhouse Acton also authored a reference work, The Castles & Old Mansions of Shropshire, with the proceeds being donated to the Royal Salop Infirmary and the Eye and Ear Dispensary. The book went on to be regarded as "very valuable" to the Shropshire Archaeological and Natural History Society.

== Legacy ==
Frances Stackhouse Acton died on 24 January 1881 in Acton Scott at the age of 86. Her obituary in The Gardeners' Chronicle noted that she had "wide knowledge of geological, botanical, horticultural and antiquarian lore"
