= Richard Knight (1659–1745) =

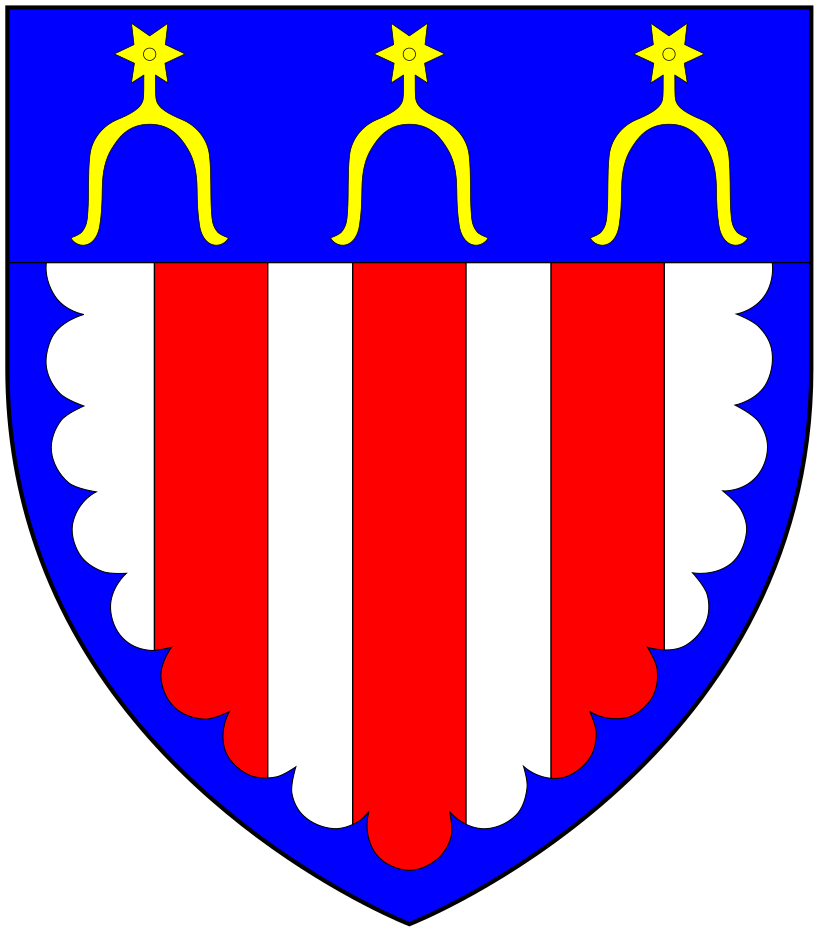
Arms of Knight: Argent, three pales gules within a bordure engrailed azure on a chief of the last three spurs or

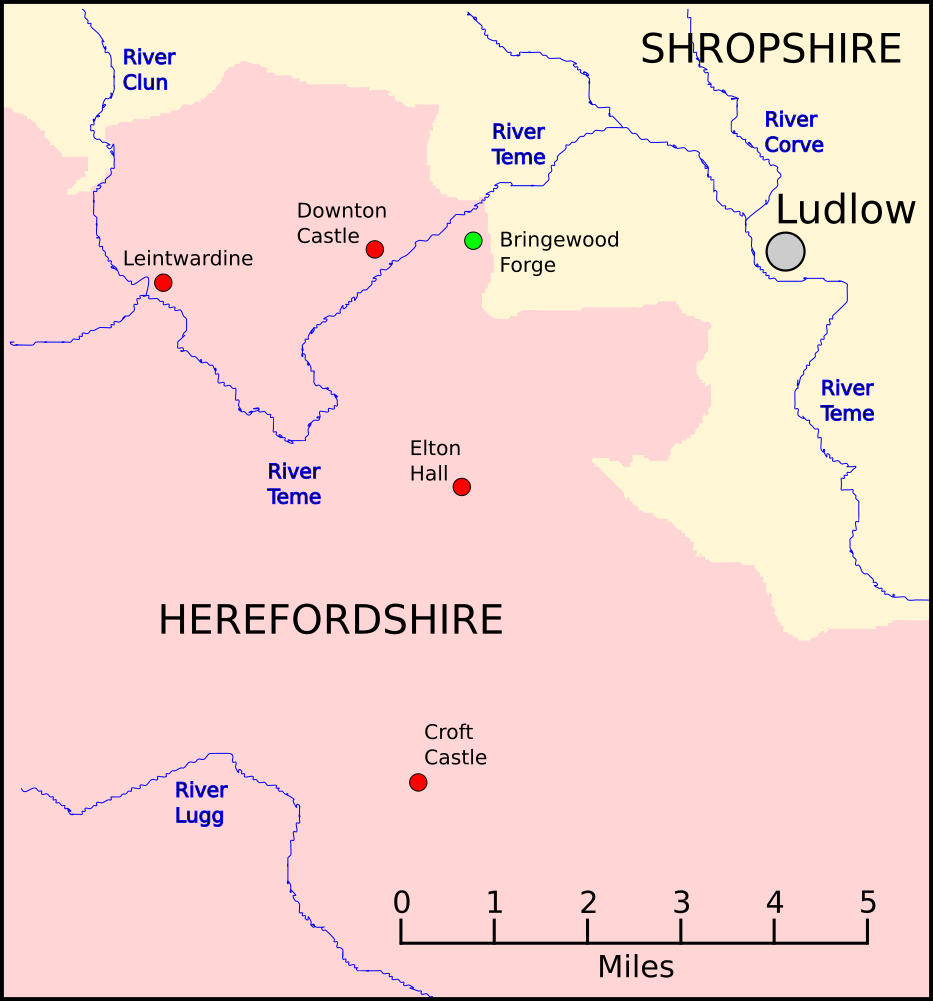
Map showing properties in Herefordshire owned by members of the knight family, descendants of the ironmaster Richard Knight (1659-1745) of Downton

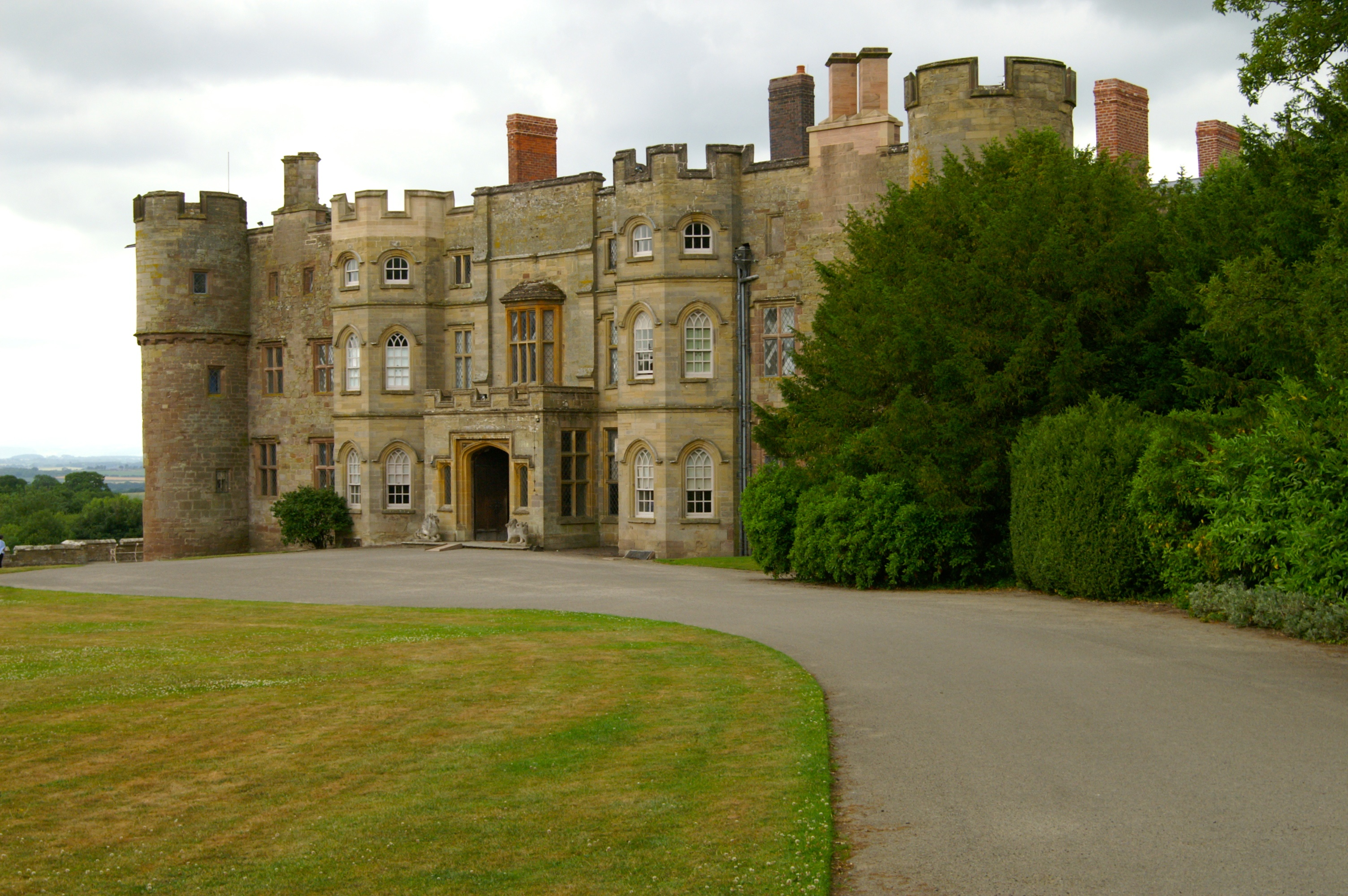
Croft Castle, Yarpole, Herefordshire, purchased in 1746 by Richard II Knight (1693-1765)

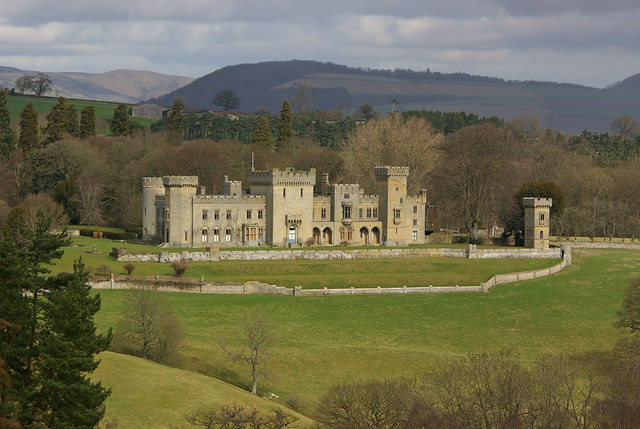
Downton Castle, Downton on the Rock in Herefordshire, re-built 1772-1778 by (Richard) Payne Knight (1750-1824), MP and a connoisseur of art, who rebuilt Downton in the Gothic Revival style

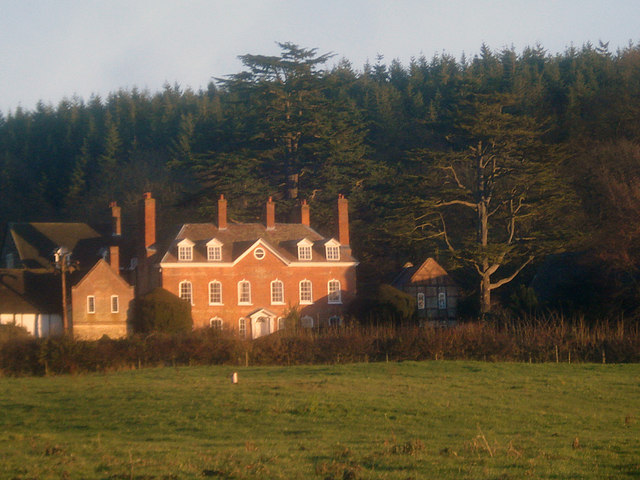
Elton Hall, Herefordshire, home of Thomas Andrew Knight (1759-1838)

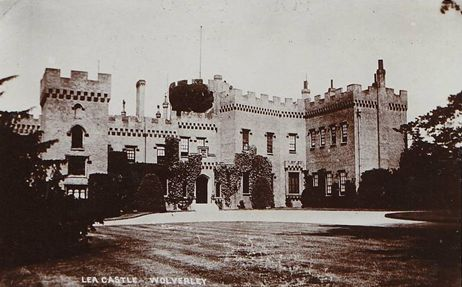
Lea Castle, Wolverley, Worcestershire, built after 1809 by John II Knight (1765-1850) and sold by him about 9 years later in about 1818 to help finance his purchase of Exmoor Forest. Demolished 1945 with the exception of the gatehouse which still stands

Richard Knight (1659–1745), of Downton Hall, in the parish of Downton on the Rock in Herefordshire, England (situated about 5 miles (8 km) west of Ludlow), was a wealthy ironmaster who operated the Bringewood Ironworks, on the Downton estate, and founded a large fortune and family dynasty.

== Origins ==
He was born in 1659, the son of Richard Knight of Madeley, Shropshire.

== Career ==
He was engaged in the iron trade at the time of the Commonwealth and acquired great wealth by the ironworks of Shropshire.

== Marriage and children ==
He married Elizabeth Payne (1671–1754), a daughter of Andrew Payne of Shawbury in Shropshire, by whom he had four sons as follows:

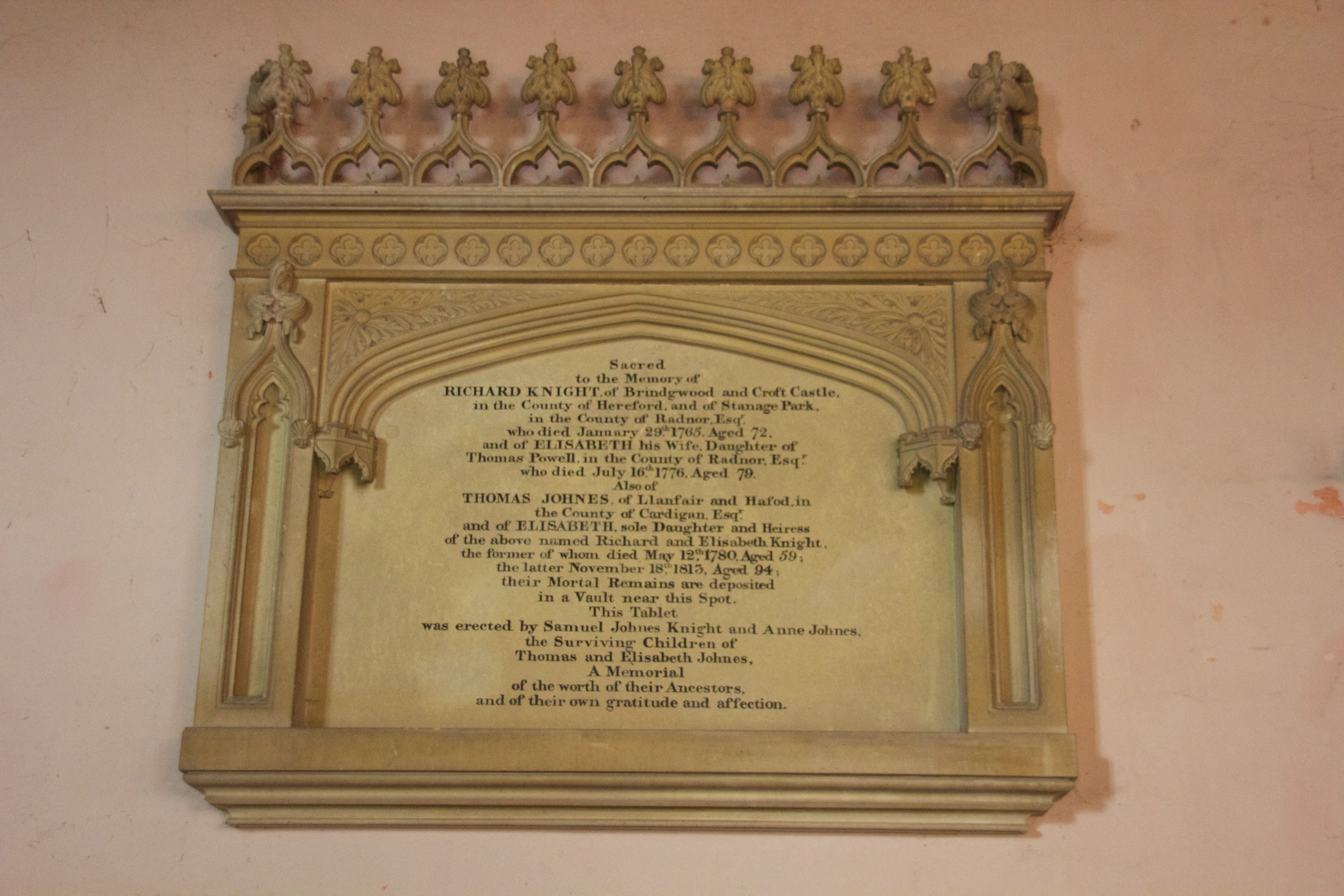
Mural monument (erected 1813/16) to Richard II Knight (1693-1765), Chapel of Croft Castle, erected by his two surviving grandchildren Thomas Johnes Knight (d.1816), MP (who adopted the additional surname of Knight), and Anne Johnes

- Richard II Knight (1693–1765), eldest son, of Croft Castle (which he purchased from the Croft family in 1746, one year after his father's death) in the parish of Yarpole, Herefordshire, about 5 miles (8 km) south of Downton, who married Elizabeth Powell, daughter of Samuel Powell of Stanedge, Radnorshire, by whom he had a sole daughter and heiress:
  - Elizabeth Knight, who married Thomas I Johnes (c.1721–1780) of Llanfair Clydogau, MP for Radnorshire (1777–80). In the 1760s he remodelled Croft Castle in the Rococo-Gothic style to the design of the architect Thomas Pritchard (d.1777). They had numerous children, including:
    - Thomas II Johnes (1748–1816) of Croft Castle, MP, who adopted the additional surname of Knight (according to the mural monument he erected 1813/16 to his ancestors in the chapel of Croft Castle), a pioneer in the field of agriculture. He purchased another estate at Hafod Uchtryd, Ceredigion, Wales, 65 miles (105 km) away, the manor house of which he filled with valuable works of art. He planted 3 million trees on the Hafod estate and created a highly picturesque landscape painted in 1789 by J. M. W. Turner (1775–1851). He met with financial difficulties and sold Croft Castle in the 1780s to Somerset Davies (c.1754–1817), MP for Ludlow in 1783. He continued to reside at Hafod, badly damaged by fire in 1807.
- Rev. Thomas Knight (1697–1764), 2nd son, of Wormsley Grange, Rector of Bewdley, Worcestershire, who married Ursula Nash, a daughter of Frederick Nash of Dinham, Shropshire, by whom he had children:
  - (Richard) Payne Knight (1750–1824), eldest son, MP and a connoisseur of art, who rebuilt Downton in the Gothic revival style, as Downton Castle, surviving today. Died unmarried.
  - Thomas Andrew Knight (1859-1838), of Elton Hall in the parish of Elton in Herefordshire (3 miles (5 km) south-east of Downton) and later of Downton Castle (which he inherited from his elder brother), a horticulturalist and botanist who served as the 2nd President of the Royal Horticultural Society (1811–1838). He married Frances Felton, a daughter of Humphry Felton of Woodhall in Shropshire, by whom he had four surviving daughters, including:
    - Charlotte Knight (c.1801 – 14 May 1842), a notable horticulturalist, who in 1824 married Sir William Edward Rouse-Boughton, 2nd and 10th Baronet (1788–1856), a Member of Parliament for Evesham in Worcestershire. She was the heiress of her father's Downton Castle estate, although the inheritance was unsuccessfully contested by her senior male cousin (John II Knight (1765–1850), of Wolverley, the pioneering developer of the Forest of Exmoor in Somerset) in the lengthy and famous lawsuit of Knight v Knight (1836–40).
- Edward Knight (1699–1780), 3rd son, of Wolverley House, Wolverley in Worcestershire, who in 1726 married Elizabeth James, heiress of Olton End near Solihull, Warwickshire, by whom he had children:
  - Edward Knight (1734–1812), unmarried
  - James Knight (1735–1808) of Ludlow, died childless.
  - John I Knight (1740–1795), 3rd son, of Lea Castle, Wolverley, and of Wolverley House, who married Henrietta Cunyngham, daughter of Daniel Cunyngham, by whom he had two sons:
    - John II Knight (1765–1850), eldest son, of Lea Castle (which he built circa 1809 and sold in 1818), Wolverley, of 52 Portland Place in London, and of Simonsbath House, Exmoor, Somerset, an agricultural pioneer who commenced the reclamation of the barren moorland of the former royal forest of Exmoor in Devon and Somerset.
    - Thomas Knight (1775–1853) of The Mount, Papcastle, Cumbria, a noted mathematician. His elder brother sued him in the celebrated 1840 lawsuit Knight v Knight, concerning the inheritance of their cousin|Payne Knight (1750–1824), of Downton Castle. He married Isabella Walker, by whom he had eight sons and six daughters.
- Ralph Knight (1703–1754), fourth son, of Bringwood, Herefordshire, who married Mary Duppa, daughter of Duppa Duppa of Longueville, Shropshire, by whom he had one son and five daughters including:
  - Thomas Knight (d.1803) of Henley Hall, died unmarried.

== Sources ==
- Burke's Genealogical and Heraldic History of the Landed Gentry, 15th Edition, ed. Pirie-Gordon, H., London, 1937, pp. 1305-6, pedigree of Knight of Wolverley; p. 1306, pedigree of Rouse-Boughton-Knight of Downton Castle
- Greene, Miranda, The Knight family and the British iron industry: the Bringewood Partnership, 2005, published on Herefordshire Through Time, Herefordshire Council website
