= John Knight (Exmoor pioneer) =

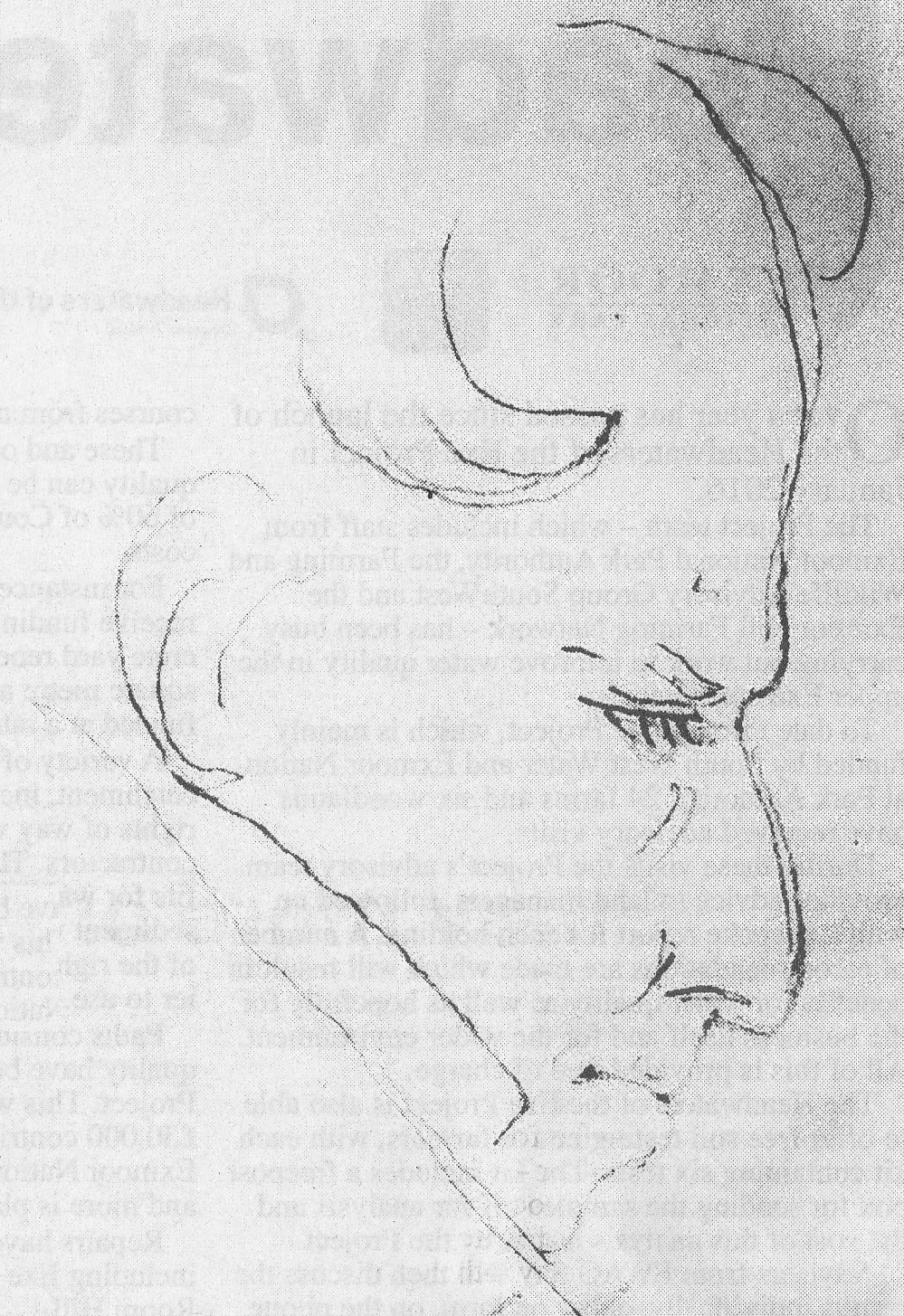
Profile sketch portrait of John Knight, from commonplace book of his daughter Isabella. Edward Lear Collection, British Museum

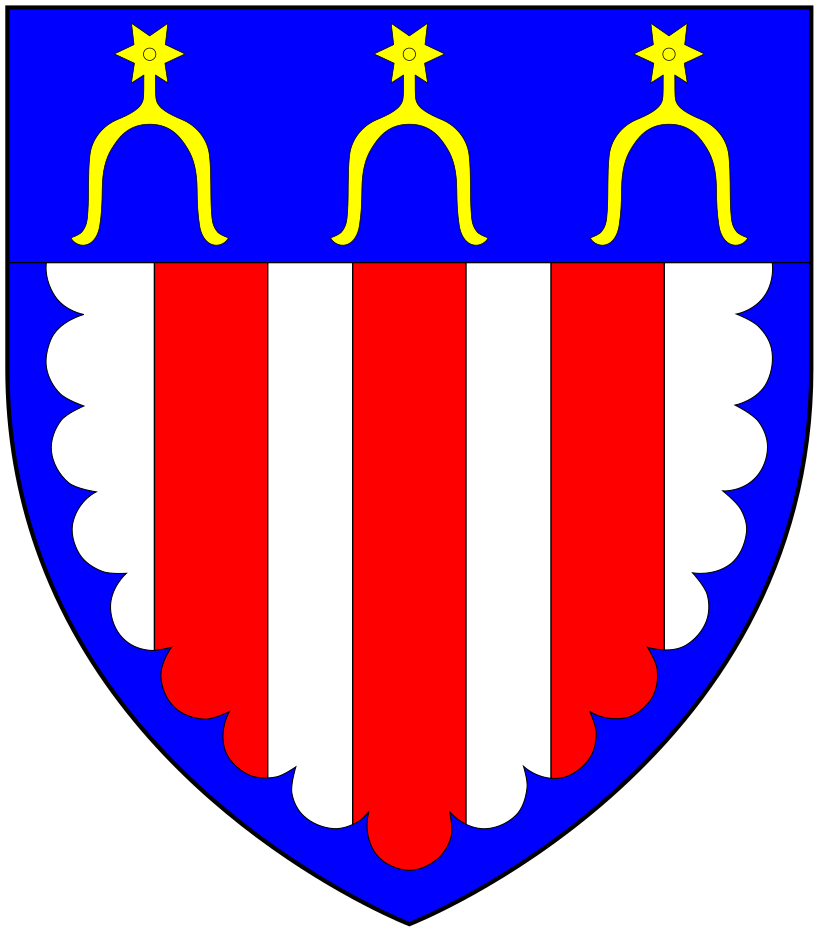
Arms of Knight: Argent, three pales gules within a bordure engrailed azure on a chief of the last three spurs or

John Knight (1765–1850) of Lea Castle, Wolverley, of 52 Portland Place in London, and of Simonsbath House, Exmoor, Somerset, was an agricultural pioneer who commenced the reclamation of the barren moorland of the former royal forest of Exmoor in Devon and Somerset, England.

== Origins ==
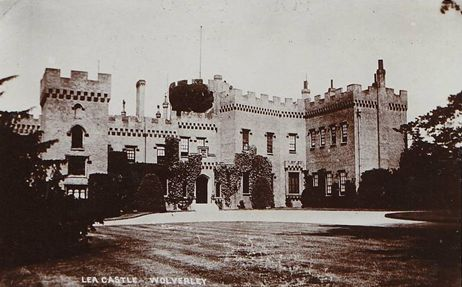
Lea Castle, Wolverley, postcard photograph c. 1900. Built after 1809 by John Knight I, ironmaster. Sold by his son John Knight II (1765–1850) in about 1818 to finance his purchase of Exmoor Forest. Demolished 1945 with the exception of the gatehouse which still stands. A series of watercolours c. 1816 of the interiors of Lea Castle attributed to the painter John Carter (1748–1817) is held by the Metropolitan Museum of Art, New York, Elisha Whittelsey Collection, no. 56.601(4)

John II Knight (1765–1850) was the son of the ironmaster John I Knight (d.1795) of Lea Castle, the son of Edward Knight (d.1780), 3rd son of Richard Knight (1659–1745) of Downton, a wealthy ironmaster and founder of the family's fortune, proprietor of Bringewood Ironworks. John II Knight's younger brother was the mathematician Thomas Knight (1775–1853) of The Mount, Papcastle, Cumbria, against whom he brought the celebrated 1840 lawsuit Knight v Knight, concerning the inheritance of their cousin Payne Knight (1750–1824), MP, of Downton Castle.

== Career ==
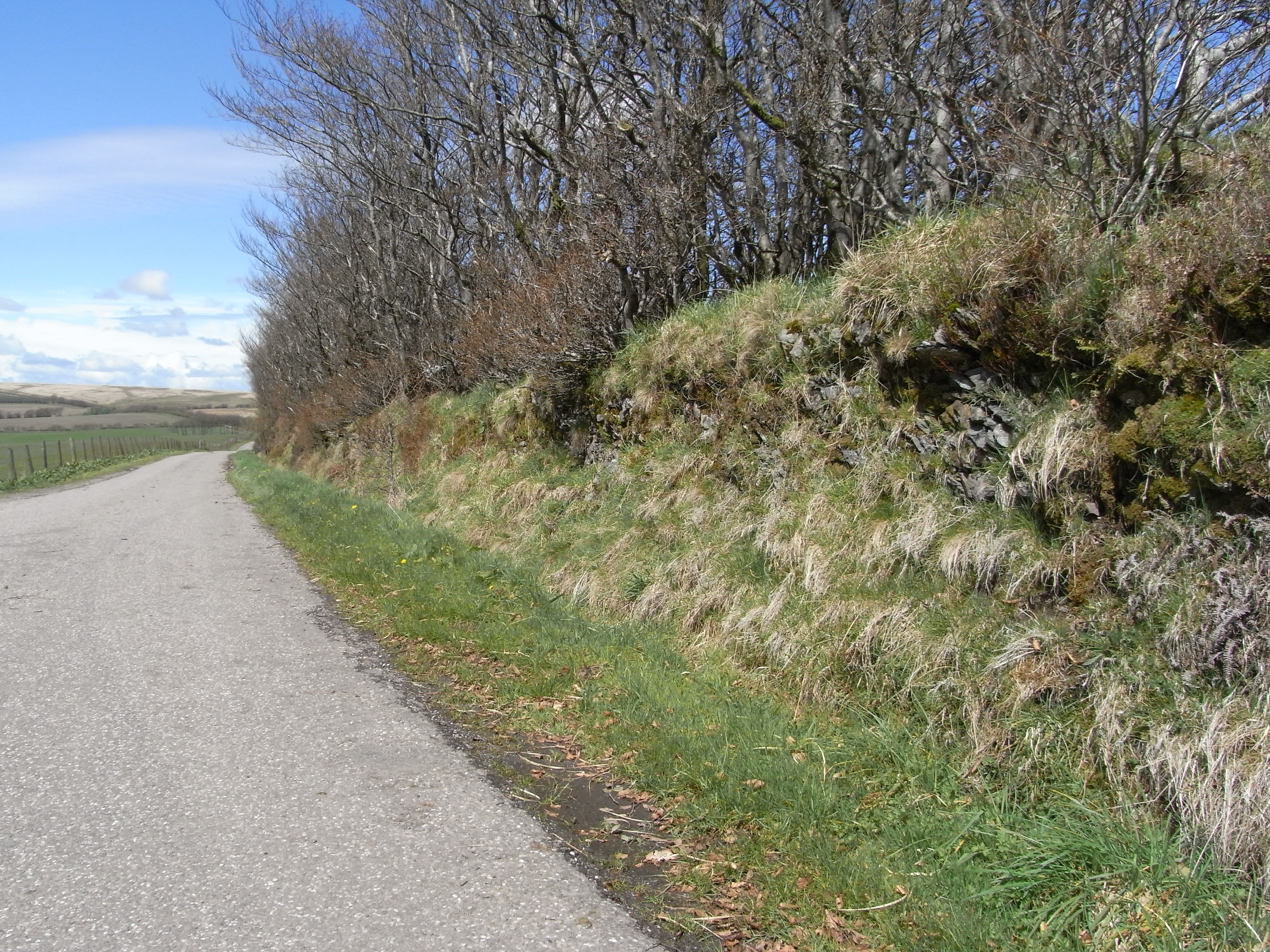
Stock-proof hedgebank erected circa 1824 by John Knight, this particularly well-preserved section separating the Forest of Exmoor from the manor of North Molton, to the west (left)

In August 1818 he purchased at public tender the 10,262 1/4 acre former royal forest of Exmoor and began what became the largest single land reclamation project in England. The Forest of Exmoor had been sold by King George III's Commissioners of Woods, Forests and Land Revenues. He had a connection with the area as his aunt Mary Knight was the wife of Col. Coplestone Warre Bampfield (d.1791) of Hestercombe, Somerset, the nephew of Sir Coplestone Warwick Bampfylde, 3rd Baronet (c. 1689–1727), lord of the manors of Poltimore and North Molton, both in Devon. Col. Coplestone Warre Bampfield was a great-grandson of Sir Coplestone Bampfylde, 2nd Baronet (c. 1633–1692). The manor of North Molton is adjacent to the east side of the Forest of Exmoor and the Bampfylde family had certain valuable ancient grazing rights over the forest. Knight later increased his Exmoor estate to about 20,000 acres by purchasing surrounding land, particularly the so-called "allotments" which had been granted by the royal commissioners to the principal adjoining landholders to compensate them for the loss of their ancient rights over the royal forest. He built a stock-proof stone-faced wall or hedgebank around the whole estate, nearly 29 miles long, together with about 22 miles of public roads, and commenced the great task of reclaiming the rough grazing of the high moors, all over 1,000 ft, to arable production, and built two farmsteads, Honeymead and Cornham, to the east and west respectively of his own residence at Simonsbath House, Simonsbath, formerly the only residence on the forest, built by James Boevey (1622–1696) in 1654, which already had enclosed farmland of 108 acres.

== Knight v Knight (1840) ==
In 1836 he launched a lawsuit against his younger brother Thomas Knight (1775–1853) of Papcastle, and others, attempting to recover the estates of his father's first cousin Payne Knight (1750–1824), MP, of Downton Castle, which estates had mostly derived from the family patriarch Richard Knight (1659–1745) of Downton. The case was decided against him in 1840, and the disappointment of losing such a large inheritance may have prompted him to leave the country, which he did in 1842.

== Marriages and children ==
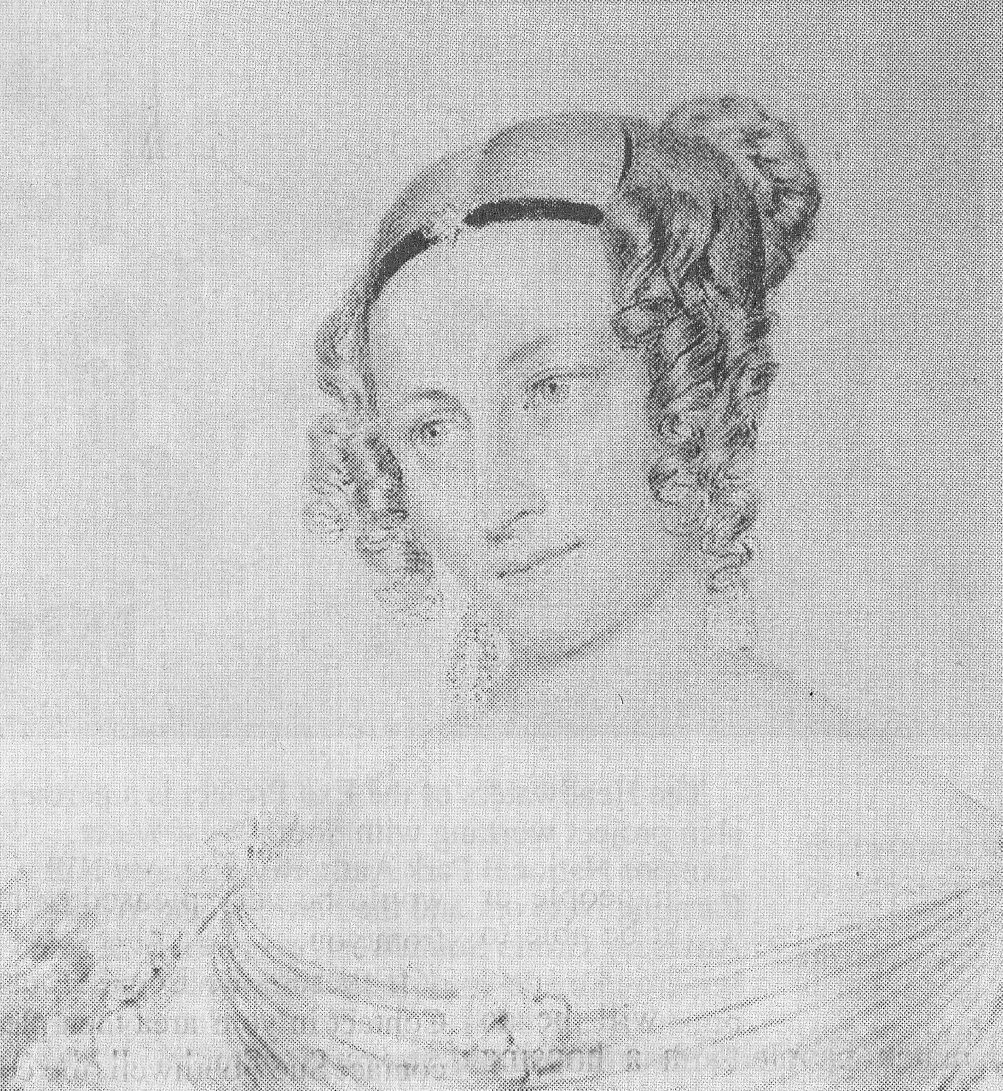
Hon. Jane Elizabeth Allanson-Winn, 2nd wife of John Knight (d.1850). Possibly by Franz Nadorp, commonplace book of Isabella Knight, her daughter. Edward Lear Collection, British Museum

He married twice:

- Firstly to Helen Charlotte Hope (d. pre-1812), a daughter of Hon. Charles Hope-Weir (1710–1791) of Craigiehall, Midlothian, the second son of Charles Hope, 1st Earl of Hopetoun; without children.
- Secondly to Hon. Jane Elizabeth Allanson-Winn (d.1841), daughter of George Allanson-Winn, 1st Baron Headley (1725–1798), by whom he had children including:
  - Colonel Sir Frederick Winn Knight (1812–1897), KCB, a Conservative Member of Parliament, who completed his father's pioneering development of Exmoor.

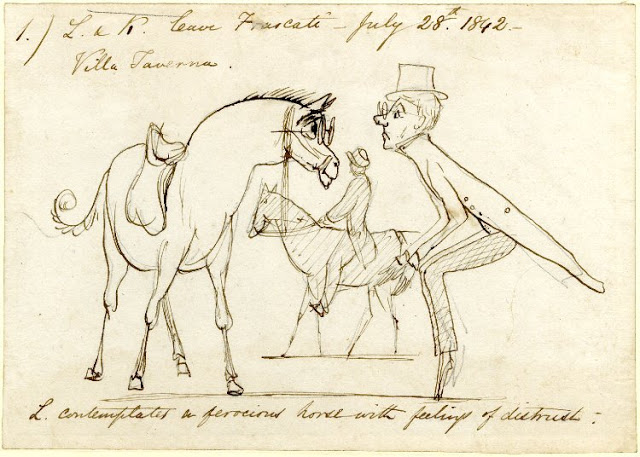
1st of 21 sketches by Edward Lear, documenting his Italian tour with his friend Charles Knight. Caption: "L & K leave Frascati, July 28th 1842, Villa Taverna. L contemplates a ferocious horse with feelings of distrust". British Museum, London

  - Charles Allanson Knight (1814–1879) who married Jessie Ramsay (1828–1922), daughter of William Ramsay (1800–1881) (alias Innes) of Barra, Inverurie, and widow of Count Alexander de Polignac(d.pre-1862). He was a friend and contemporary of the writer and artist Edward Lear (1812–1888), with whom in 1842 he made a tour of the Abruzzi. Having given him riding lessons "round the walls of Rome", he lent the artist one of his horses for the journey, an Arab named Gridiron. Lear made several drawings during the journey which "make fun of his poor horsemanship, with typical self-deprecating humour" and "record the pair's adventures in comic form". Lear described the journey in his Illustrated Excursions in Italy, Vol.1, 1846, in which he refers to Knight as "CK". Lear "remembered their adventures for the rest of his life and on his deathbed he lay dreaming of the ride around Rome".
  - Edward Lewis Knight (1817–1882), of Hornacott Manor, Boyton, Cornwall. He married three times:
    - Firstly to Elizabeth Harris
    - Secondly in 1868 to Henrietta Mary Sanford, by whom he had issue.
    - Thirdly 1877 to Edith Emma Butler (1851–1936)
  - Margaret Knight, eldest daughter, who on 11 December 1855, at Rome, married (as his 2nd wife) the Italian nobleman and man of letters Michelangelo Caetani di Sermoneta (1804–1882), 13th Duke of Sermoneta, 3rd Prince of Teano. The family's friend Edward Lear referred to her in his 1858 correspondence from Rome: "Margaret Dss. of Sermoneta fading slowly: but kinder & softer than most Knights are. All are just as friendly as ever to me".
  - Isabella Jane Knight (d.18 July 1870), 2nd daughter, from 1840 "a hopeless invalid". Her surviving "Commonplace book" (first leaf signed and dated: "Isabella Jane Knight, /Simonsbath - Febry. 1837") contains several well-executed drawings and portraits, many by Edward Lear and Franz Nadorp, and was donated to the British Museum in 1938 by Lt-Col C. Morley Knight. The family's friend Edward Lear referred to her in his 1858 correspondence from Rome: "The Knights live here much as ever, Isabella passing her 18th year in bed (I mean she has been in bed 18 years — ) but bright & patient always". She died unmarried. She lived at the Palazzo Bracci, Via Rasella, Rome and died at 7 Piazza Pitti, Florence.

== Retirement & death ==
In 1842, aged 76, he retired to the Villa Taverna in Rome (or perhaps in Frascati,), leaving his 30-year-old eldest son Frederick Knight to complete his work, to whom he had handed over the management of the Exmoor estate in 1841. He died in Rome in 1850 aged 85.

== Sources ==
- Burke's Genealogical and Heraldic History of the Landed Gentry, 15th Edition, ed. Pirie-Gordon, H., London, 1937, pp. 1305-6, pedigree of Knight of Wolverley; p. 1306, pedigree of Rouse-Boughton-Knight of Downton Castle
