= Knight v Knight =

English legal case 1840

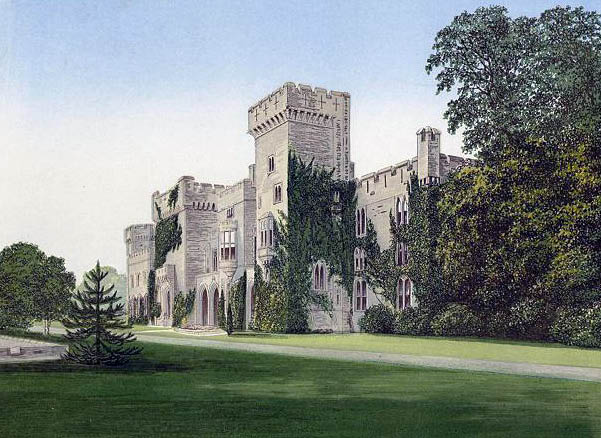
- Downton Castle, Herefordshire
- Court: Court of Chancery
- Full case name: Knight v Boughton
- Decided: 7 August 1840
- Citation: (1840) 49 ER 58, (1840) 3 Beav 148

Case opinions
- Lord Langdale MR

Keywords
- Precatory words, trust, gift, will

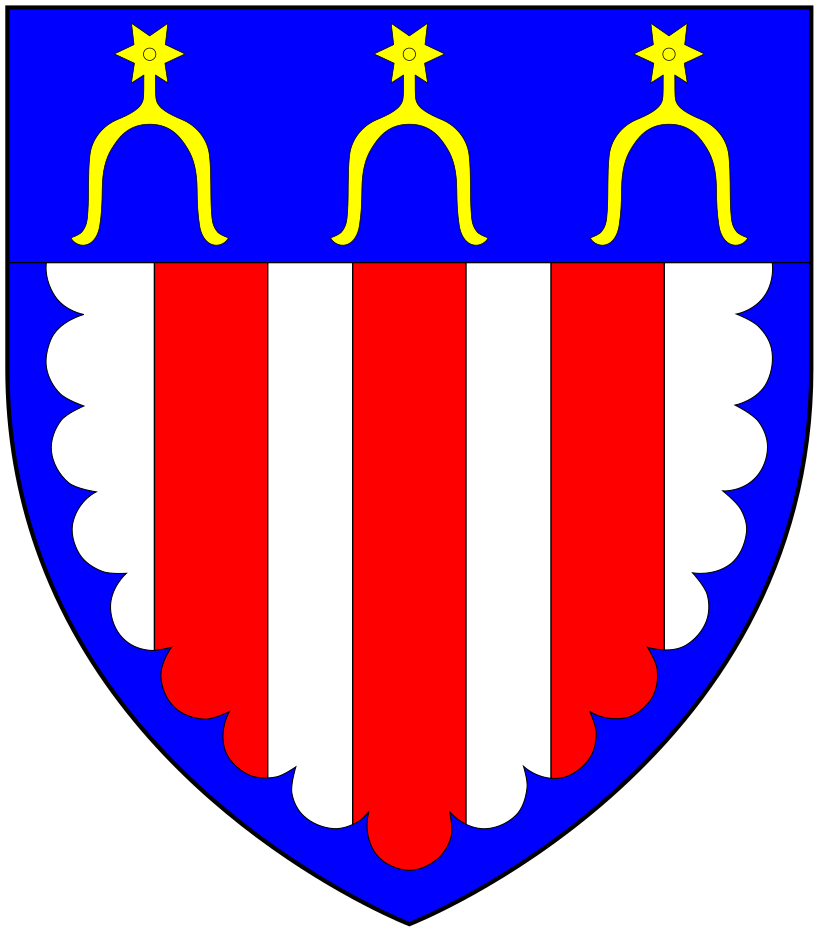
Arms of Knight: Argent, three pales gules within a bordure engrailed azure on a chief of the last three spurs or

Knight v Knight (1840) 49 ER 58 is an English trusts law case, embodying a simple statement of the "three certainties" principle. This has the effect of determining whether assets can be disposed of in wills, or whether the wording of the will is too vague to allow beneficiaries to collect what appears on the face of the will to be theirs. The case has been followed in most common law jurisdictions.

== Facts ==
Richard I Knight (1659–1749) of Downton in the parish of Downton on the Rock in Herefordshire, a wealthy ironmaster from Madeley, Shropshire, proprietor of the Bringewood Ironworks, and founder of the family's fortune, made a settlement on 26 April 1729, which passed the manors of Leintwardine and Downton, Herefordshire, including Croft Castle down the family line. The first grandson (son of his second son Rev. Thomas Knight (1697–1764) of Wormsley Grange, Rector of Bewdley, Worcestershire) was (Richard) Payne Knight (1750–1824), MP, an art connoisseur (and specialist on phallic imagery), who re-built the old manor house at Downton in the Gothic Revival style as Downton Castle. Payne Knight made his will on 3 June 1814, leaving the property to his brother, Thomas Andrew Knight (a horticulturalist), and in tail male to his male descendants. But if there were none, the property was to pass to the "next descendant in the direct male line of my late grandfather, Richard Knight of Downton". However, he also stated:

"I trust to the liberality of my successors to reward any others of my old servants and tenants according to their deserts, and to their justice in continuing the estates in the male succession, according to the will of the founder of the family, my above-named grandfather".

Thomas Knight died intestate, having been pre-deceased by his only son. His daughter, the horticulturalist Charlotte Knight (c. 1801–1843), had married Sir William Edward Rouse-Boughton, 2nd and 10th Baronet (1788–1856), a Member of Parliament for Evesham. Payne's uncle, Edward Knight (1699–1780) (3rd son of the patriarch Richard I Knight), had a grandson John Knight (1765–1850), of Lea Castle, Wolverley, the pioneering developer of the Forest of Exmoor in Somerset, who brought a claim alleging that Thomas had been bound to make a strict settlement in favour of the male line, of which he was the senior representative. Sir William Rouse-Boughton argued that no such trust had been created and that the property had in fact gone to Thomas absolutely, and thus on to Charlotte and his family.

== Judgment ==
Lord Langdale MR held that the words of Payne's will were not sufficiently certain, which meant that there had been an absolute gift to Thomas, who had taken the property unfettered by any trust in favour of the male line. He formulated a legal test, now known as the "three certainties". This test specified that for a valid trust to be created, there must be three certainties:

- (1) Certainty of intention: there must be intention to create a trust;
- (2) Certainty of subject matter: the assets constituting the trust must be readily determinable;
- (3) Certainty of objects: the people to whom the trustees are to owe a duty must be readily determinable.

== See also ==
- English trusts law
- Certainty in English law
