= Aston Botterell =

Village in Shropshire, England

Coordinates: 52.454°N 2.544°W

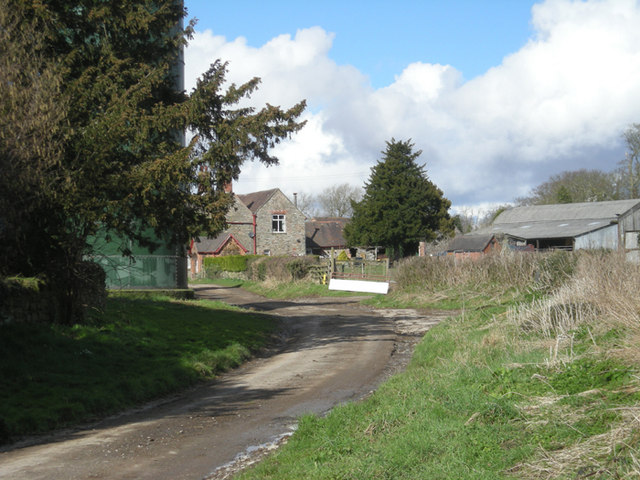
- Aston Botterell

- Location within Shropshire
- Population: 74 (2001)
- OS grid reference: SO630841
- Civil parish: Aston Botterell
- Unitary authority: Shropshire
- Ceremonial county: Shropshire
- Region: West Midlands
- Country: England
- Sovereign state: United Kingdom
- Post town: Bridgnorth
- Postcode district: WV16
- Dialling code: 01746
- Police: West Mercia
- Fire: Shropshire
- Ambulance: West Midlands
- UK Parliament: Ludlow

Aston Botterell is a village and small civil parish in the county of Shropshire, West Midlands, England. The village lies 8 miles (13 km) south-west of the market town of Bridgnorth and 10 miles (16 km) north-east of the town of Ludlow. The nearest main roads are the B4364 and the A4117. According to the 2001 census, the civil parish had a population of 74. The area's economy is still largely based on agriculture, though many residents travel up to 12 miles (19 km) to work in other sectors such as the service and manufacturing industries.

== History ==
The name of Aston Botterell is derived from the Old English for "eastern settlement (tun)", with 'Botterell' being the name of a former local landowning family: William Botterell is recorded as holding the manor in 1203. His family came over with William of Normandy in 1066. Before Saxon times, the only evidence for human activity in the area comes from the discovery of two flint arrow heads found near what is now Bold Farm. The Domesday Book of 1086 describes the manor of Eston at the time as having a population of 14 households with 2 villeins, 3 bordars, 6 serfs and 3 radmans; it was held by Tochil, from Rainald, and is recorded as having been held by a landowner called Elric in the time of Edward the Confessor. During the time of the Domesday survey, the village was in a district made up of what are now known as Aston Botterell, Norton and Charlcotte; however they were split up not long after the Norman Conquest of 1066.

By the mid-13th century, Thomas Botterell was a significant figure within Shropshire, at one point being in charge of Clun Castle. A new manor house, which replaced an older moated house, is attributed to his period of ownership. In 1264 the village gained a charter to hold weekly and annual fairs to fulfill Botterell's ambitions to turn Aston Botterell into a market town.

The Botterell family's association with the village lasted until the 17th century, which saw the rebuilding of the main hall during the Elizabethan era. By this time Aston Botterell had lost any attributes of a market town and had regressed to the series of isolated farms it once was.

In the 18th century, water-powered industry created a boom within the area surrounding Aston Botterell. Richard Knight, the owner of Bringewood Ironworks, was recorded as leasing Charlcotte blast furnace as early as 1712, though it may have been in existence in the 1690s. A paper mill was also constructed, though this had shut by the early 19th century. For a brief period in the 20th century the village was served by the nearby railway line, the Cleobury Mortimer and Ditton Priors Light Railway, which eventually closed in 1967.

== Demography ==
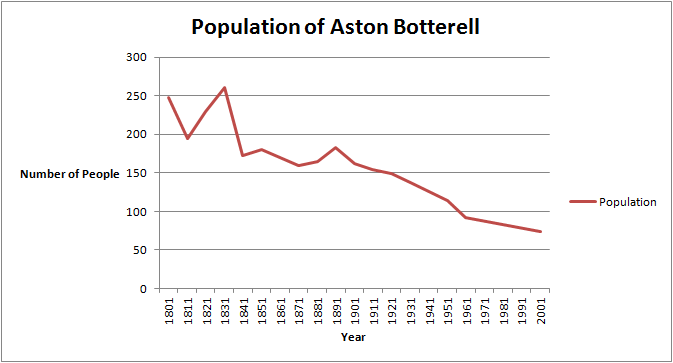
Population Graph of Aston Botterell 1801–2001

At the time of the 2001 census Aston Botterell had a population of 74. (More precise statistics for the parish of Aston Botterell are not available, as the village was paired with the parish of Neenton). 78.6% of the population were recorded as economically active, whilst 10.7% were retired citizens. The largest age bracket of the population was recorded as between the ages of 30 and 44 (28.4%).

== Economy ==
The economy of Aston Botterell has always been very much dependent on agriculture and to an extent is still today; it is situated on Old Red Sandstone, which provides good farming conditions. The 1831 census of England and Wales recorded 76% of the population of the village as being employed in agriculture declining to 33% in the 1881 census. Agriculture is still a large part of the area's economy; according to the 2001 census, 25.2% of Aston's Botterell's population were still employed within the agriculture, hunting and forestry industries. The wholesale and retail trade and repair of motor vehicles was the second highest employment sector, with 16% of the population, and manufacturing the third at 15.1%. An economic analysis performed by Shropshire County Council in 2008 revealed that workers in the Bridgnorth region typically worked more hours than the English average and had a lower weekly wage.

=== Charlcotte Furnace ===
The Charlcotte furnace is one of the best-preserved charcoal furnaces in England. The furnace was owned by Richard Knight, one of the chief ironmasters in the 18th century West Midlands; Knight employed it to produce pig iron for his Bringewood Ironworks, located in north Herefordshire. The furnace was fed by iron ore mined on the Brown and Titterstone Clee Hills. On average it produced 400 tonnes of iron each year; however the pattern of its output varied greatly over its lifespan. The furnace was closed in 1779 due to competition from coke-fired blast furnaces, where the problems of producing a form of pig iron suitable for conversion into wrought iron had been solved: another contributing factor was the high price of charcoal locally. In 2019 the Charlcotte furnace was subject to a comprehensive conservation project by Historic England, which involved letting in new stonework as required and repairing structural cracks in the furnace structure.

== Religious sites ==
=== St. Michael and All Angels Church ===
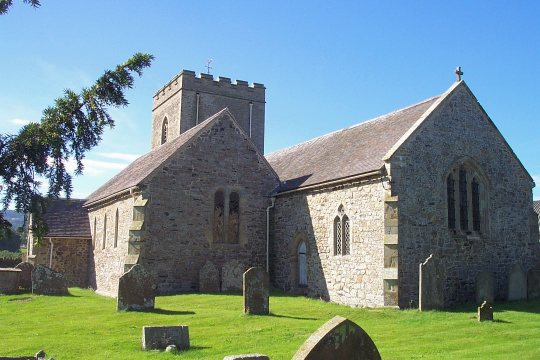
St.Michael and All Angels Church

St. Michael and All Angels Church is part of the Church of England under the Diocese of Hereford. It has been a grade II* listed building since 1970. According to surveys by English Heritage, the oldest part of the church is the chancel which is believed to originate from the 12th century, with the roof being updated around the 15th century. The tower was taken down and rebuilt in 1884 after a porch was added in 1639. The building features a monumental slab to John Botterell, added in 1479 and a large canopied monument to another John Botterell and his wife added in 1588.
