= Burrington, Herefordshire =

Village and civil parish in Herefordshire, England

Coordinates: 52.344483°N 2.820227°W

Burrington
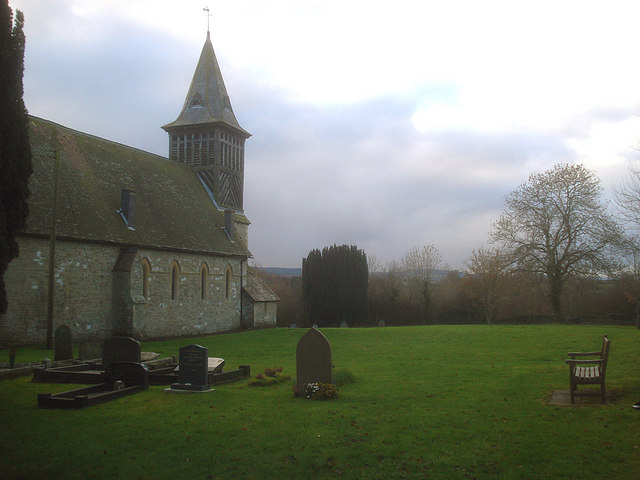

- Location within Herefordshire
- Population: 138 (2011)
- OS grid reference: SO4472
- Civil parish: Burrington
- Unitary authority: Herefordshire
- Ceremonial county: Herefordshire
- Region: West Midlands
- Country: England
- Sovereign state: United Kingdom
- Post town: Ludlow
- Postcode district: SY8
- Police: West Mercia
- Fire: Hereford and Worcester
- Ambulance: West Midlands
- UK Parliament: North Herefordshire

Burrington is a small village and civil parish in the far north of Herefordshire, England.

It is part of the Leintwardine group of parishes and shares a parish council with Leintwardine and Downton.

It is located 6 miles (10 km) southwest of Ludlow, and features a parish church dedicated to St George.

== History of church and parish ==
Burrington is a settlement which dates back to the Domesday Book, when the manor was held by Edric the Wild, around whom many legends subsequently grew. The present church dates from 1864, when an earlier structure was rebuilt. It boasts possibly the finest collection of seventeenth and eighteenth century cast iron grave slabs in the country.

Little is known about the date of the original church on the site. An unsigned drawing of 1842 shows it to have been a much lower structure than the present building, consisting of nave, chancel and wooden south porch. At the west end was a wooden belfry with a shingled broach spire. All windows, including the three light east window, were square headed with hood moulds, suggestive of a date in the early sixteenth century. An unusual feature was a small blocked opening high in the east gable, also with a hood mould, the purpose of which is unclear. The chancel of the old church was longer than that of the present building, with the grave slabs originally being placed inside. A large dormer window probably gave light to a west gallery. The exterior of the church was rendered and limewashed, giving it a very Welsh appearance.

=== 1864 rebuilding ===
The churchwardens' accounts, which survive from 1833, suggest that fairly regular expenditure was necessary to maintain the building, particularly the roof, belfry and glazing, and it is possible that this provided some of the impetus to rebuild.

The cost of rebuilding the nave was borne entirely by the local landowner, Mr A. Boughton-Knight of Downton Castle, while that of the chancel was met by the Vicar and a number of subscribers. There was probably a disagreement between Knight and the Vicar, Philip Hale, which resulted in the use of different architects for the two parts of the building.

For the nave, Knight employed the Shrewsbury architect Samuel Pountney Smith, who in 1861 had already built him a new church at Downton. Pountney Smith was a competent, and at times original, local architect who had been responsible for a number of rebuildings and restorations in Shropshire. The chancel was the work of a nationally known architect, George Frederick Bodley, who had earlier designed a new vicarage at Burrington. Bodley, whose finest works may be seen at Hoar Cross, Staffordshire and Pendlebury, Lancashire, was married to a lady from Kinnersley and carried out a number of minor commissions in Herefordshire. Pevsner notes that the nave and chancel appear to be of the same design and doubts that Bodley would have continued in the style of Pountney Smith without making some changes.

A memorandum in the Parish register written by Rev. Philip Hale draws attention to the shortening of the chancel. It states that the original chancel had been extended eastwards, and had become the joint responsibility of the vicar and the parish. By returning it to the original dimensions, the anomaly had been removed. It would appear that the vicar was also able by this means to snub the Knight family by banishing their ancestral graves to the churchyard. Further evidence of this disagreement is provided by a note that the chancel screen was the property of the vicar, even though the arch under which it was erected was part of the nave. Unfortunately no record of this dispute has yet appeared in either the Knight papers or the parish or diocesan records. The parish magnanimously contributed the sum of twelve pounds to purchase "an altar, altar coverings and linen, also a surplice, Bible and Altar Service Book."

=== Recent developments ===
The work was completed with great rapidity, and the church today appears substantially as it would have done in 1864. It was necessary to carry out major repairs in the 1930s, but these did not affect the appearance of the building. The pressure to amalgamate small rural parishes affected Burrington earlier than most. During the incumbency of Rev. W. H. Ashton (1929–1934) it was joined with Downton, and under Rev. F. I. Turney (1941–1949) Aston and Elton were added to the benefice. Subsequently, in 1976 Burrington became part of the united parish of Wigmore Abbey.

In 1981 the tower was found to be unsafe, and the whole village became involved in a successful campaign to raise the necessary sum of £10,000. By 1987 the work was completed, the wooden structure having been re-seated on concrete beams. At the same time the interior was entirely replastered and redecorated, and the cast iron grave slabs re-sited for easier viewing. Continuing improvements have included a set of striking hassocks embroidered by members of the parish.

The churchyard contains a Commonwealth war grave of an airman from World War II.

In 2016, the church closed as the building had become dangerous, with falls of roof tiles and plaster within and outside the church. It is on Historic England's list of buildings at risk.

=== Description ===
The external appearance of the church shows no indication that it was the work of two architects. It was designed in the Early English Gothic style of the thirteenth century, with lancet windows except for the three light east window which has simple plate tracery. The building is much higher than its predecessor, and the wooden belfry with which it is surmounted provides a slight echo of the former structure.

The interior is plain, the nave and chancel being divided by the wooden screen of 1864, which is also executed in a plain thirteenth century style. The original retable behind the altar is of stone, consisting of three arches in which the Lord's Prayer and Decalogue are inscribed.

The belfry contains three bells, one of which, the treble, is a rare survival of a medieval long-waisted bell. The tenor was cast in 1727 by Abraham Rudhall III and is inscribed "Prosperity to this Parish". The third bell is of similar design and age.

=== The Monuments ===
Burrington is famous for its fine series of cast iron grave slabs situated outside the east end of the chancel. This type of memorial is associated with areas of early ironfounding, being particularly found in the Weald of Kent and Sussex, though it is doubtful if that area has a collection to rival Burrington.

Bringewood Chase was a centre of ironfounding in charcoal furnaces from Elizabethan times until it was eclipsed by the Coalbrookdale area in the later eighteenth century. Charcoal was burnt locally in the coppiced oak woods of the Chase, and iron ore and limestone were brought by pack horse from the Clee Hills, The memorials commemorate members of the local ironfounding families, particularly the Walkers and the Knights. Job Walker whose family had worked the ironworks for its owners the Earls of Essex and Craven, purchased its lease in 1690. The Walkers sold out in 1727 to Thomas Knight, the owner of furnaces at Madeley and Wolverley. The Knights acquired a great many small estates in the area, and when ironworking ceased, the Downton Castle estate was landscaped by Richard Payne Knight, a leader of the Picturesque movement.

The eight slabs commemorate:

- Robert Seward died 1619
- Maria Hare died 1674
- Jane Hare died 1678
- Richard Knight died 1745
- Joyce Walker died 1658
- William Walker died 1676
- Jane & Barbara Knight died 1701 & 1705
- Ralph Knight died 1754

The slabs are interesting in showing the development of lettering styles during the period, progressing from the sans-serif design of the seventeenth century to the full serif design of the eighteenth as seen on Richard Knight's monument. The fine display of heraldry illustrates the skill of the craftsmen who made the castings. Similar memorials, also to members of the Walker family, may be seen in the chancel at Onibury, Shropshire.

== Bibliography ==
- A Short History & Guide to St.George's Burrington by Martin Speight
