= Burrington =

Burrington may refer to:

- Burrington, Devon, England
- Burrington, Herefordshire, England
- Burrington, Somerset, England
  - Burrington Combe, a limestone gorge and valley near Burrington, Somerset
- Manchester, Iowa, USA, formerly known as Burrington
