= Thomas Andrew Knight =

English botanist (1759–1838)

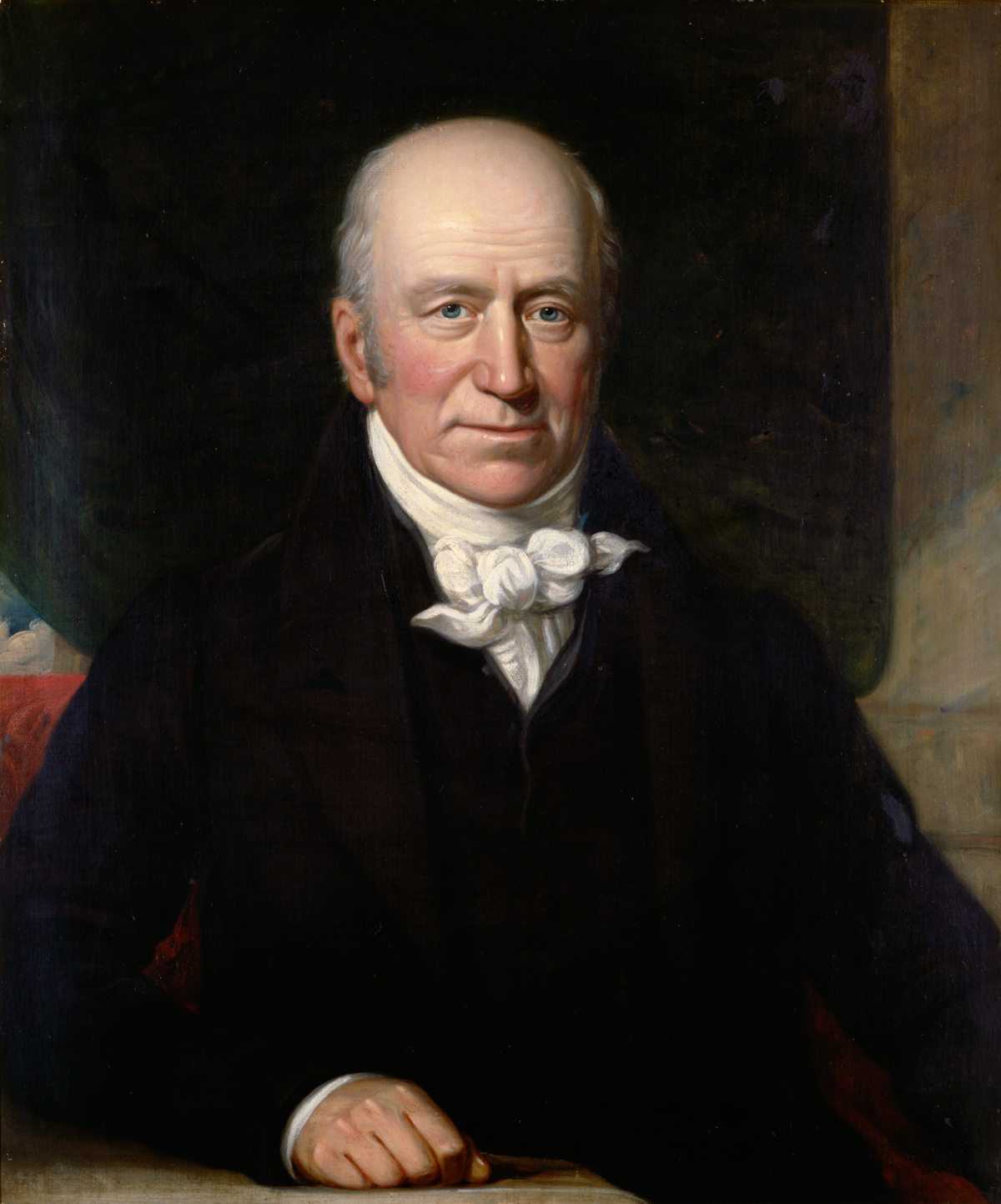
- Portrait by Solomon Cole, 1835
- Born: 12 August 1759; Wormsley Grange, Herefordshire, England
- Died: 11 May 1838 (aged 78); London, England
- Resting place: St Mary's Church, Wormsley
- Known for: plant breeding and selection
- Children: Frances Acton; Elizabeth Knight; Charlotte Knight
- Relatives: Payne Knight (brother); Richard I Knight (grandfather)
- Scientific career
- Fields: botanist
- Author abbrev. (botany): T.Knight

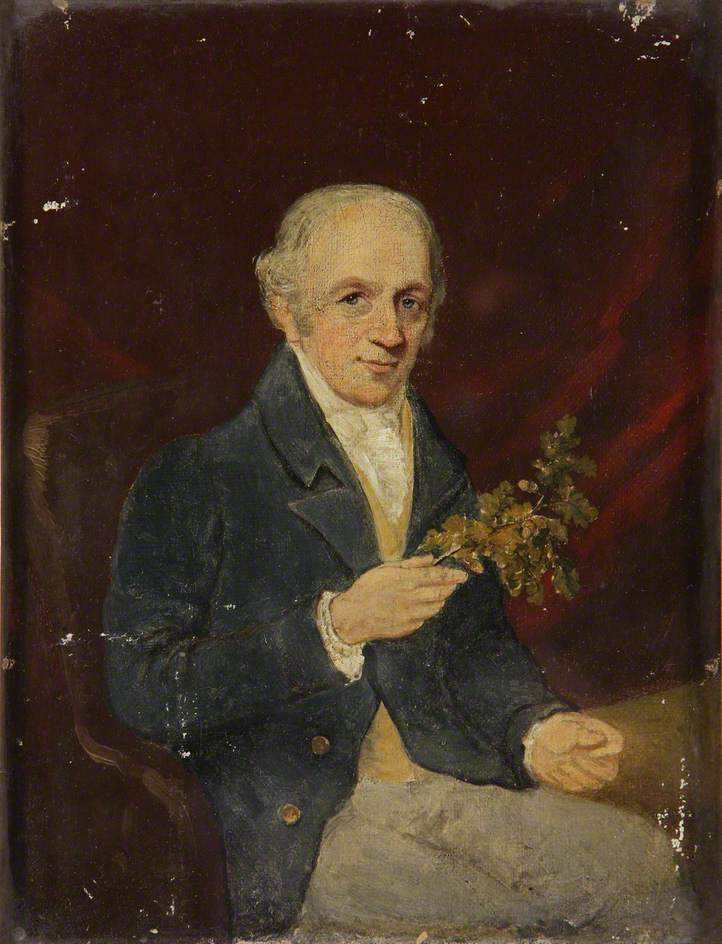
Portrait of Thomas Andrew Knight, holding an Oak branch, dated January 1837, by Edmund Ward Gill (1794–1868), Hereford Museum and Art Gallery

Thomas Andrew Knight, FRS (12 August 1759 – 11 May 1838) was an English horticulturalist and botanist. He served as the president of the Royal Horticultural Society from 1811 to 1838.

== Origins ==
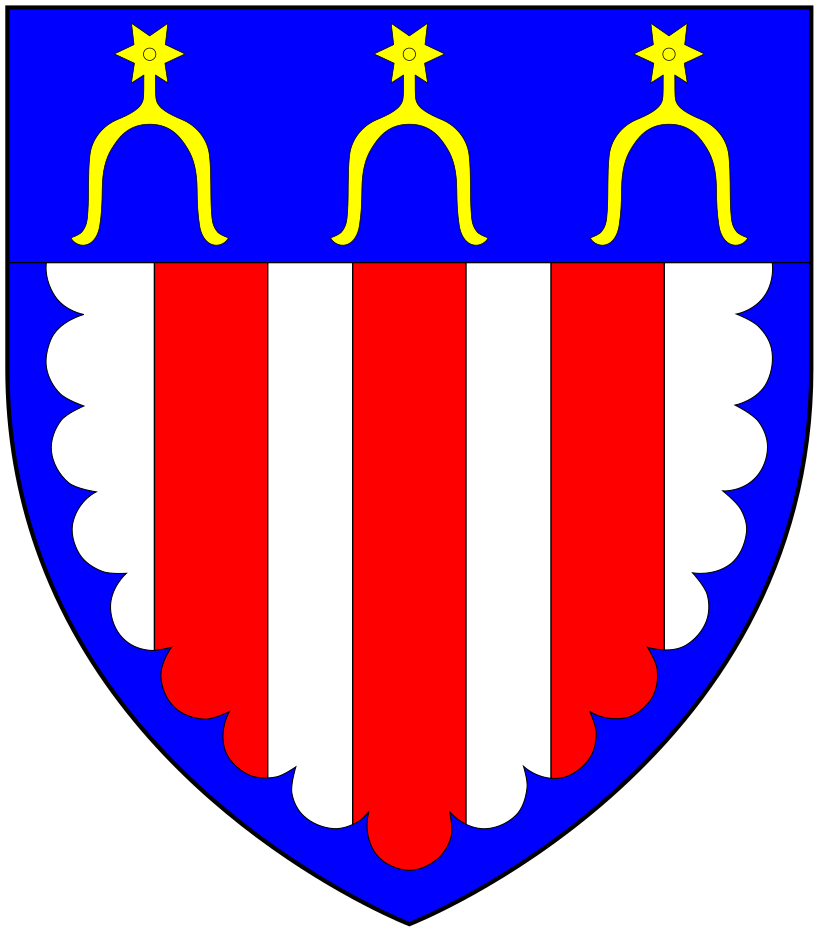
Arms of Knight: Argent, three pales gules within a bordure engrailed azure on a chief of the last three spurs or

He was born at Wormesley Grange, five miles north-west of Hereford in Herefordshire, the second son of Rev. Thomas Knight (1697–1764) of Wormsley Grange, Rector of Bewdley, Worcestershire, and Ursula (née Nash), a daughter of Frederick Nash of Dinham, Shropshire. He was the heir of his unmarried elder brother the art connoisseur Payne Knight (1750–1824), MP, who had been the heir not only of their father but also of their uncle Richard II Knight (1693–1765) of Croft Castle and of Downton, and who had re-built Downton Hall as the surviving Gothic revival style Downton Castle. Richard II Knight as the eldest of five sons was the heir of his father Richard I Knight (1659–1745), of Downton, a wealthy ironmaster of Bringewood Ironworks, on the Downton estate, who founded the family's great fortune.

== Career ==
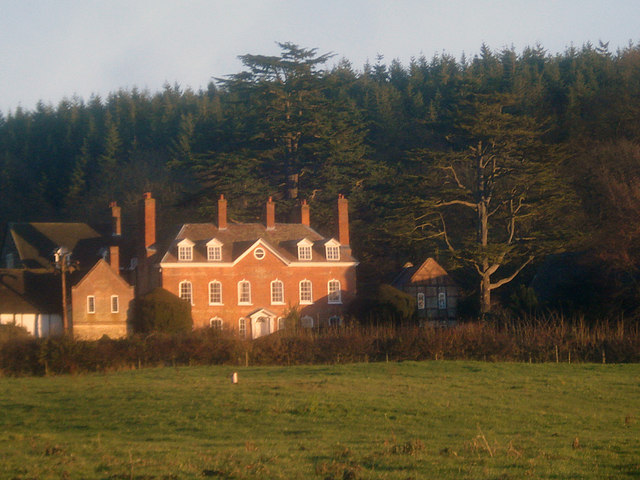
Elton Hall, residence of Thomas Andrew Knight, before he inherited nearby Downton Castle from his elder brother

He attended Balliol College, Oxford. After graduation, he took up the study of horticulture. In 1795 he published the results of his research into the propagation of fruit trees and the diseases prevalent among them. He used 10,000 acres (4,000 ha) of land he inherited and built a curvilinear greenhouse for breeding plants including strawberries, cabbages and peas. In 1797 he published his Treatise on the Culture of the Apple and Pear, and on the Manufacture of Cider and Perry, a work which passed through several editions. His breeding experiments, between identified plant varieties, led to new cultivars of apples. He would select among hundreds of seedlings to pick out the few with improved characteristics. For example, the Siberian Harvey cider apple was among about 4 seedings he kept from 300 crosses. His work on the specific gravity and thus sugar content of apple juice were important to development of the UK cider industry. He also devised new horticultural and agricultural equipment such as a new turnip seed drill, razor sharpener and pineapple pit.

He was one of the leading UK researchers in horticulture in the eighteenth and nineteenth centuries, but his personal papers disappeared after his death.

Knight performed new physiological experiments on plants. He investigated the effects of gravity on seedlings and how decay in fruit trees was passed on by grafting. In many respects his work looked back to that of Rev. Stephen Hales. His goals were always strictly practical, aiming to improve food plants by breeding for better qualities. In the mid-19th century, the Downton strawberry was a popular strawberry in Britain, until it was eclipsed by modern strawberry hybrids at the turn of the century.

It is not widely known that he studied variation in peas and made similar observations to Mendel, but he failed to make the same imaginative leap about the relationships between these changes. Knight intentionally shut himself off from outside scientific influences but did maintain correspondence with others around the world as well as meeting some of them during his annual visits to London. He refused to read anyone else's scientific papers until Sir Joseph Banks, with whom he had a voluminous correspondence, persuaded him to do so. Knight also corresponded with Sir Humphry Davy.

His research was, however, read and appreciated by his contemporaries. Charles Darwin acknowledged Knight's breeding experiments in The Origin of Species. He was elected a Fellow of the Royal Society in 1805 and awarded the Copley medal in 1806. He was given honorary membership and awards from agricultural and horticultural societies in Europe, Russia, the US and Australia. Distribution of Knight's apple seeds and scions to the USA helped develop its apple industry.

From 1811 to 1838 Knight was president of the London Horticultural Society, founded in 1804. Banks, president of the Royal Society, had recognised Knight's contributions to science and asked him to join the Horticultural Society, as it was then known. After the death of the first president, George Legge, 3rd Earl of Dartmouth, Banks proposed Knight as president. In 1864 the Society received a royal patent from Albert, Prince Consort, which permitted it to be known as the Royal Horticultural Society. Banks called upon Knight to write a "prospectus" for the society (what would now be called a mission statement), outlining its functions and purpose.

Younger members of the Society were inspired by his example, such as Thomas Laxton. Laxton adopted methods of careful observation and practical goals that resulted in improved varieties of apples, peas and sweet peas among many others, together with a thriving seed business.

== Personal life ==
He married Frances Felton, a daughter of Humphry Felton of Woodhall in Shropshire, and they had the following children:

- Thomas Andrew Knight (d. 29 November 1827), eldest son and heir apparent, who predeceased his father without any children.
- Frances Knight (d. 1874), a botanist, archaeologist, writer and artist, who in 1812 married Thomas Pendarves Stackhouse Acton (d. 1835) of Acton Scott; they did not have any children.
- Elizabeth Knight (d. 3 August 1860), who in 1828 married Francis Walpole (d. 1861), son of Hon. Robert Walpole, son of Horatio Walpole, 1st Baron Walpole of Wolterton, brother of Robert Walpole, 1st Earl of Orford (1676–1745), first Prime Minister of Great Britain. They had several children.
- Charlotte Knight (c. 1801–14 May 1842), a notable horticulturalist, who in 1824 married Sir William Edward Rouse-Boughton, 2nd and 10th Baronet (1788–1856), a member of parliament for Evesham in Worcestershire. She was the heiress of her father's Downton Castle estate, although the inheritance was unsuccessfully contested by her senior male cousin (John Knight (1765–1850), of Lea Castle, Wolverley, the pioneering developer of the Forest of Exmoor in Somerset) in the lengthy and famous lawsuit of Knight v Knight (1836–40).

== Death and burial ==
He died in 1838 and was buried in the churchyard of St Mary's Church, Wormsley, where his surviving chest tomb is a grade II listed structure.

== Publications ==
Knight was the author of over 100 publications published by the Horticultural Society or Royal Society. He also wrote books. These publications included:

- Treatise on the Culture of the Apple and Pear, and on the Manufacture of Cider and Perry. Printed for G. Mudie and Son, South Bridge; and J. Johnson, London. 1st edition 1797, 2nd enlarged edition 1801 with multiple further editions.
- Pomona Herefordensis (1811) on the old cider and perry fruits of Herefordshire. Illustrations by Elizabeth Matthews from Hereford and Frances Stackhouse Acton. Originally published in parts to subscribers, and subsequently as a book. Published for the Agricultural Society of Herefordshire by W. Bulmer & Co Cleveland-Row, St James's, London.
- Knight, T. A. (1799) An Account of some Experiments on the Fecundation of Vegetables. Philosophical Transactions of the Royal Society, 89 195–204

== See also ==
- Knight v Knight (1840) 3 Beav 148
