= Adolf Henning =

German painter

Carl Adolf Henning (28 February 1809 – 25 March 1900) was a German painter.

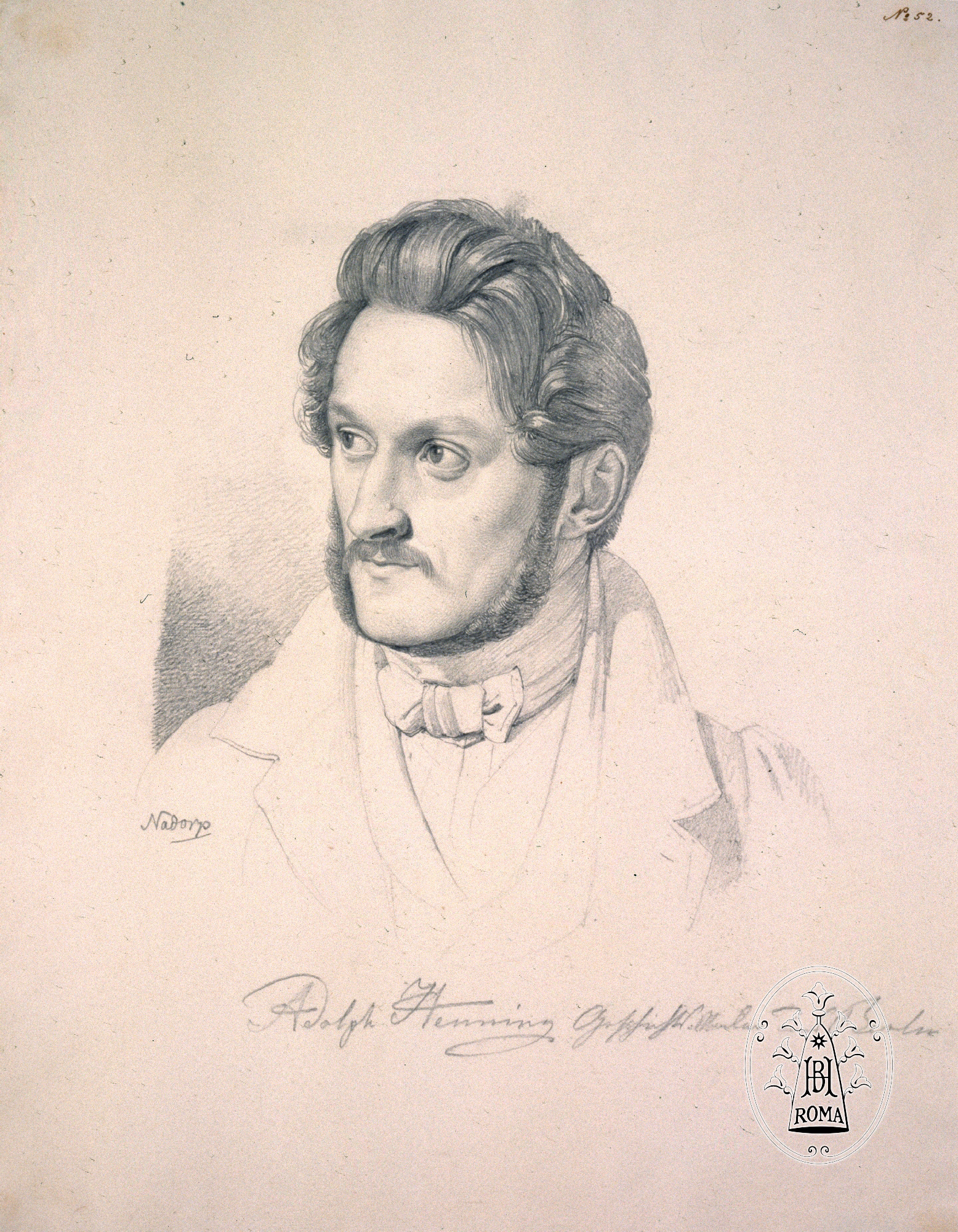
Adolf Henning, drawn by Franz Nadorp, Rome around 1834

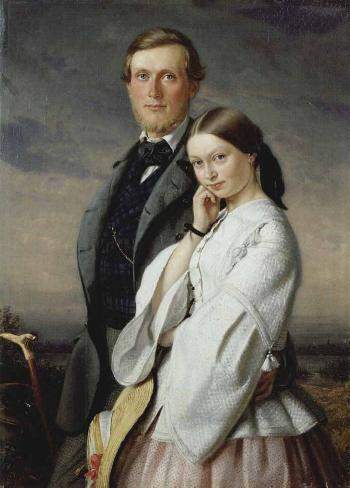
Children of the Artist, 1858

== Early life ==
Adolf Henning was born on 28 February 1809 in Berlin as the son of the court conductor Carl Wilhelm Henning (1784–1867). From 1823 he studied at the Berlin academy of arts under Wilhelm Wach and others. In 1833, he studied at the academy of arts in Düsseldorf in the first class under Wilhelm von Schadow as a history and portrait painter

== Stay in Rome ==
Together with the painter Heinrich Mücke, Henning travelled to Italy from 1833 to 1835. During his time in Rome, he twice portrayed the famous model Fortunata Segatori. The oil painting in question is now in the Thorvaldsen Museum in Copenhagen, the second portrait, a drawing, in a private collection in Germany.

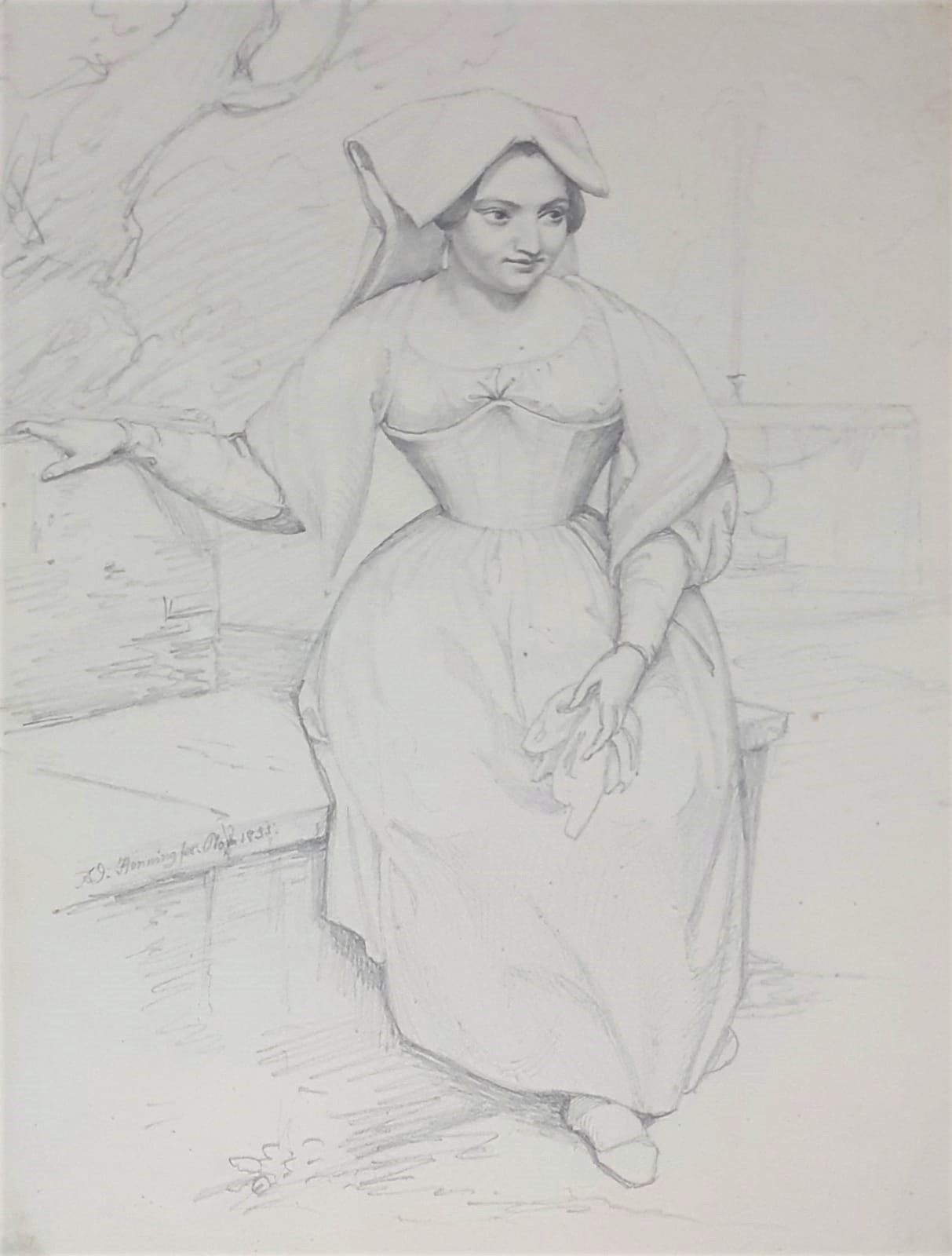
Portrait of a Roman Woman (Fortunata Segatori), pencil on paper, Rome 1833

== Later life ==
After his return to Berlin, he earned his living as a successful portrait painter. In 1839, he became a member and professor at the Berlin academy. Henning had been married to Marie Jordan (born 1816 in Berlin, died 1899 also in Berlin) since 1836. His brother-in-law, also his friend, was the painter Rudolf Jordan. Henning died in 1900 in Berlin.

== Museums with works by Adolf Henning (selection) ==
- Alte Nationalgalerie Berlin
- Neues Museum Berlin
- Berlinische Galerie Berlin
- Thorvaldsen Museum Copenhagen
- National Museum, Poznań
