= Frederica Orlebar =

English author and diarist (1839–1928)

Frederica St. John Orlebar (née Rouse-Boughton, 1839–1928) was an English author, local historian and diarist.

She was born Frederica St. John Rouse-Boughton at Downton Hall, Shropshire in 1839 to Sir William Rouse-Boughton, 2nd and 10th Baronet, and horticulturalist Charlotte Knight. On 30 July 1861, she married Richard Orlebar. They had two children, Lieutenant-Colonel Richard Rouse-Boughton Orlebar and Beauchamp Orlebar.

Orlebar was the author of a Japonisme children's book, The Adventures of Her Serene Limpness, the Moon-Faced Princess, Dulcet and Debonaire (1888).

From 1870, Orlebar began researching papers in the Orlebar family home at Hinwick, Bedfordshire. She compiled these into The Orlebar Chronicles in Bedfordshire and Northamptonshire, 1553–1733; or, The Children of the Manorhouse and Their Posterity. This was published in 1930, two years after her death.

Orlebar kept a diary, probably intending it to be read by her descendants. Her detailed and frank observations about domestic and family life have been useful to historians.
