= St Mary's Church, Wormsley =

Coordinates: 52.1255°N 2.8377°W

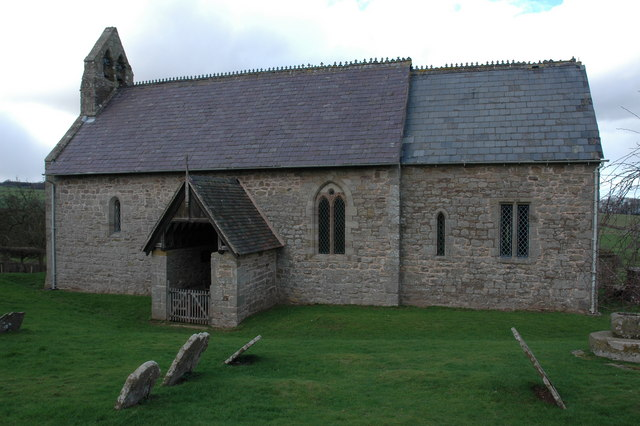
- St Mary's Church, Wormsley, from the south

- Location in Herefordshire
- OS grid reference: SO 427 477
- Location: Wormsley, Herefordshire
- Country: England
- Denomination: Anglican
- Website: Churches Conservation Trust

Architecture
- Functional status: Redundant
- Heritage designation: Grade II*
- Designated: 2 September 1966
- Architectural type: Church
- Style: Norman, Gothic
- Groundbreaking: 12th century

Specifications
- Materials: Sandstone, Welsh slate roofs with tiles

St Mary's Church is a redundant Anglican church in Wormsley, approximately 7.5 miles (12 km) north-west of Hereford, Herefordshire, England. It is recorded in the National Heritage List for England as a designated Grade II* listed building, and is under the care of the Churches Conservation Trust.

== History ==
The present church contains Norman features dating from the 12th century, although it is thought that an earlier church may have existed on the site. Alterations were made in the 13th century and later. The chancel was probably rebuilt in the 19th century. The church was declared redundant on 1 March 1972, and was vested in the Churches Conservation Trust on 21 May 1974.

== Architecture ==
=== Exterior ===
St Mary's is constructed in sandstone rubble with sandstone ashlar dressings. It is roofed in Welsh slate with tiles on the crests. The plan is simple, consisting of a three-bay nave with a south porch, and a two-bay chancel. At the west end of the nave is a gabled bellcote with two trefoiled openings which dates from the 13th century. The north side of the nave contains a blocked doorway with a lancet window to its right and a trefoil-headed window to the left. In its south wall is one lancet window to the left of the porch and a double lancet to the right. In the north wall of the chancel are two lancet windows, and in the south wall is one lancet window and a pair of square-headed windows. The east window consists of three stepped lancets. The south doorway dates from the 12th century. It has a large lintel and a tympanum decorated with lozenges.

=== Interior ===
The chancel arch dates from the 13th century. The font is from the 12th or 13th century and consists of a round bowl on a cylindrical base. The pulpit is in oak and dates from the 17th century. There is stained glass in the east window. On the north wall are brass plaques to the memory of two local men killed in the First World War.

=== Churchyard ===
In the churchyard are a cross and four monuments that are all designated as Grade II listed buildings. Only the steps and base of the churchyard cross remain. They are in sandstone and date possibly from the 14th century. There is a sandstone pedestal tomb from the late 18th century to the memory of two Knight sisters. Elsewhere are three limestone chest tombs in Neoclassical style. One is dated 1824 to the memory of Richard Payne Knight, who was an archaeologist, architect and writer. Near to this is the chest tomb of his brother, Thomas Andrew Knight, dated 1838. He was an expert fruit grower who developed new varieties of apples. There is a further chest tomb to another Thomas Andrew Knight that is dated 1827. To the east of the church is the war grave of a Second World War II Royal Navy seaman.

== See also ==
- List of churches preserved by the Churches Conservation Trust in the English Midlands
