= Charlotte Knight (horticulturalist) =

English horticulturalist

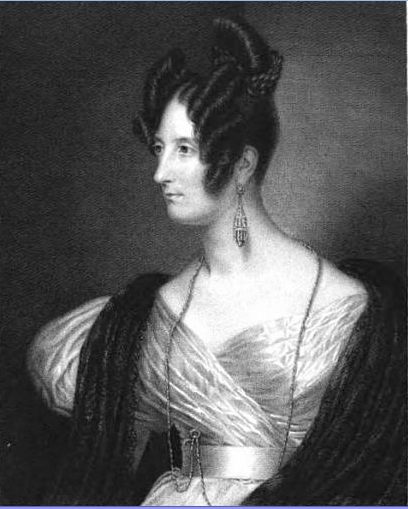
- 1834 engraving from the Court Magazine
- Born: 1801
- Died: 1843 (aged 41–42)
- Resting place: St Peter's Church, Rous Lench, Worcestershire
- Citizenship: British
- Known for: Bred the Waterloo cherry
- Spouse: William Rouse-Boughton
- Children: 3 sons and 5 daughters
- Awards: Silver Medal of the Horticultural Society of London
- Scientific career
- Fields: Horticulture

Charlotte Knight (c. 1801–1843), known after her marriage as Charlotte, Lady Rouse-Boughton, was an English horticulturalist who bred the Waterloo cherry (also known as the early black cherry).

== Origins ==
Knight was the youngest daughter and heiress of botanist Thomas Andrew Knight, a member of a wealthy iron-founding dynasty founded by his grandfather Richard Knight of the Bringewood Ironworks in Shropshire. Her father was the heir of his brother the art connoisseur Payne Knight (d.1824), MP, who rebuilt Downton Castle in Shropshire.

== Career ==
Aged just 16 in 1817, Knight was presented with the Silver Medal of the Horticultural Society of London (now the Royal Horticultural Society) in recognition of the quality of the Waterloo cherry. Her father, himself a noted botanist, had written in 1816 that the new variety "sprang from a seed of the Ambrée of Du Hamel and the pollen of the May-Duke". It was named after the Battle of Waterloo, which had taken place two years before in 1815, as it had fruited first at Elton Hall in Herefordshire a few days after Napoleon's defeat at that battle. It ripens early, in late June to early July.

Knight was mentioned in the Transactions of the Horticultural Society of London which was published in 1818.It credited her for raising the early black cherry otherwise known as the Waterloo cherry.

The writer and gardener Christopher Stocks notes in his book Forgotten Fruits (2008) that Charlotte Knight "deserves posthumous recognition" given how rare it was for women to generate new cultivars: "of all the hundreds of varieties of fruits and vegetables in this book, Waterloo is the only one not to have been created by a man".

== Marriage and children ==
In 1824, Knight married Sir William Edward Rouse-Boughton, 2nd and 10th Baronet (1788–1856), a member of parliament for Evesham in Worcestershire, by whom she had three sons and five daughters, including:

- Sir Charles Henry Rouse-Boughton, 3rd and 11th Baronet (1825–1906), eldest son and heir.
- Andrew Johnes Rouse Boughton, 2nd son, who inherited Downton Castle in Shropshire, one of the Knight estates inherited by his mother, and adopted the surname Knight.
- Frederica Orlebar, local historian and diarist

== Death and burial ==
Knight was buried in the parish church of Rous Lench, Worcestershire. A portrait of Lady Rouse-Boughton, painted by Henry Collen and engraved by John Cochran, was published in the Court Magazine in July 1834. A copy is in the National Portrait Gallery, London which also has two photographs of her daughter Catherine.
