= William Rouse-Boughton =

British politician

Sir William Edward Rouse-Boughton, 2nd and 10th Baronet (14 September 1788 – 22 May 1856) was a Member of Parliament for Evesham in Worcestershire.

== Origins ==
He was the only son and heir of Sir Charles Rouse Boughton, 1st and 9th Baronet (d.1821) by his wife Catherine Pearce. He had two sisters, Louisa and Caroline.

== Career ==
He is said to have attended Westminster School from 1803 to 1805, but the records are not clear. He attended Christ Church, Oxford after which for several years he enjoyed a European Grand Tour until 1813. In 1818 he was nominated as Member of Parliament for the rotten borough of Evesham, which seat his father had held, but was ousted on petition by Sir Charles Cockerell. His political leanings were far from clear and in his address of thanks, he described himself as "unbiased by any political party of connexion". He regained his seat in 1820 and he remained MP for Evesham until 1825. His opposition leanings became apparent once in office. He inherited the two baronetcies after his father's death in 1821.

== Marriage and children ==
On 24 March 1824, he married Charlotte Knight (1800–1842), a renowned horticulturalist, the daughter and heiress of the horticulturalist Thomas Knight by his wife, a member of the Fenton family known as the celebrated Grecian "Miss Fenton". Thomas Knight had inherited Downton Castle near Ludlow from his brother the art connoisseur Payne Knight, MP (d. 1824) and thus it passed to the Rouse-Boughton family.

He had three sons and five daughters. On his death he left £10,000 to each of his daughters and £100 to each of his sisters (Louisa and Caroline). The rest was inherited by his eldest son.

== See also ==
- Knight v Knight (1840) 3 Beav 148

Parliament of the United Kingdom
Preceded by William Manning; Humphrey Howorth	Member of Parliament for Evesham; 1818–1826; With: Humphrey Howorth 1818; Sir Charles Cockerell 1820–1825	Succeeded by Sir Charles Cockerell; Edward Davis Protheroe
Baronetage of England
Preceded by Charles Rouse Boughton	Baronet (of Lawford); 1821–1856	Succeeded by Charles Henry Rouse Boughton
Baronetage of Great Britain
Preceded by Charles Rouse Boughton	Baronet (of Rouse Lench); 1821–1856	Succeeded by Charles Henry Rouse Boughton
