= Richard Payne Knight =

English classical scholar and connoisseur (1751–1824)

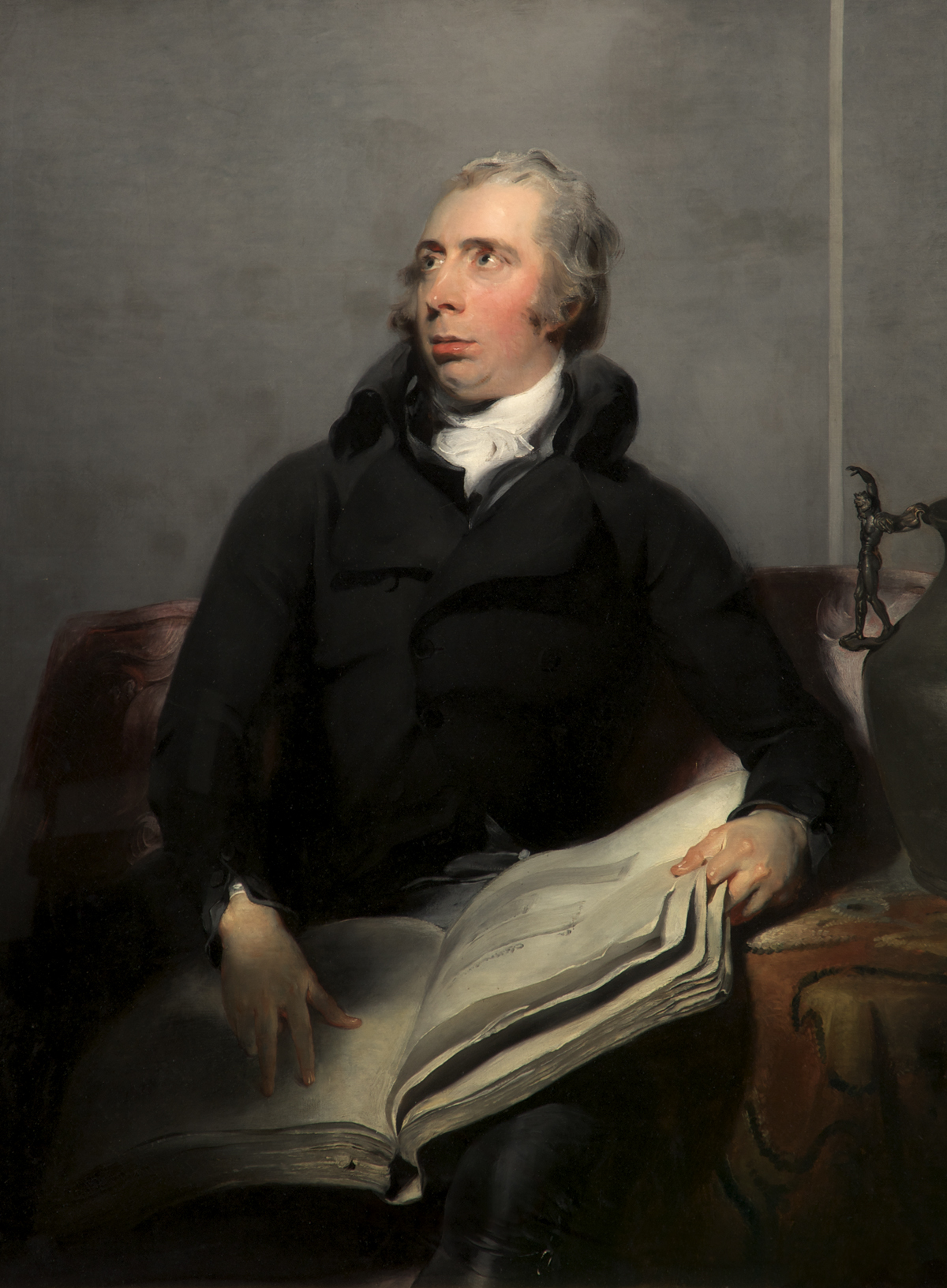
- Portrait of Payne Knight by Sir Thomas Lawrence, 1794
- Born: February 11, 1751; Wormsley Grange, Wormsley, Herefordshire, Kingdom of Great Britain
- Died: April 23, 1824 (aged 73); United Kingdom of Great Britain and Ireland
- Resting place: St Mary's Church
- Known for: Knight v Knight
- Notable work: A Discourse on the Worship of Priapus
- Parents: Rev. Thomas Knight (father); Ursula Nash (mother)
- Relatives: Thomas Andrew Knight

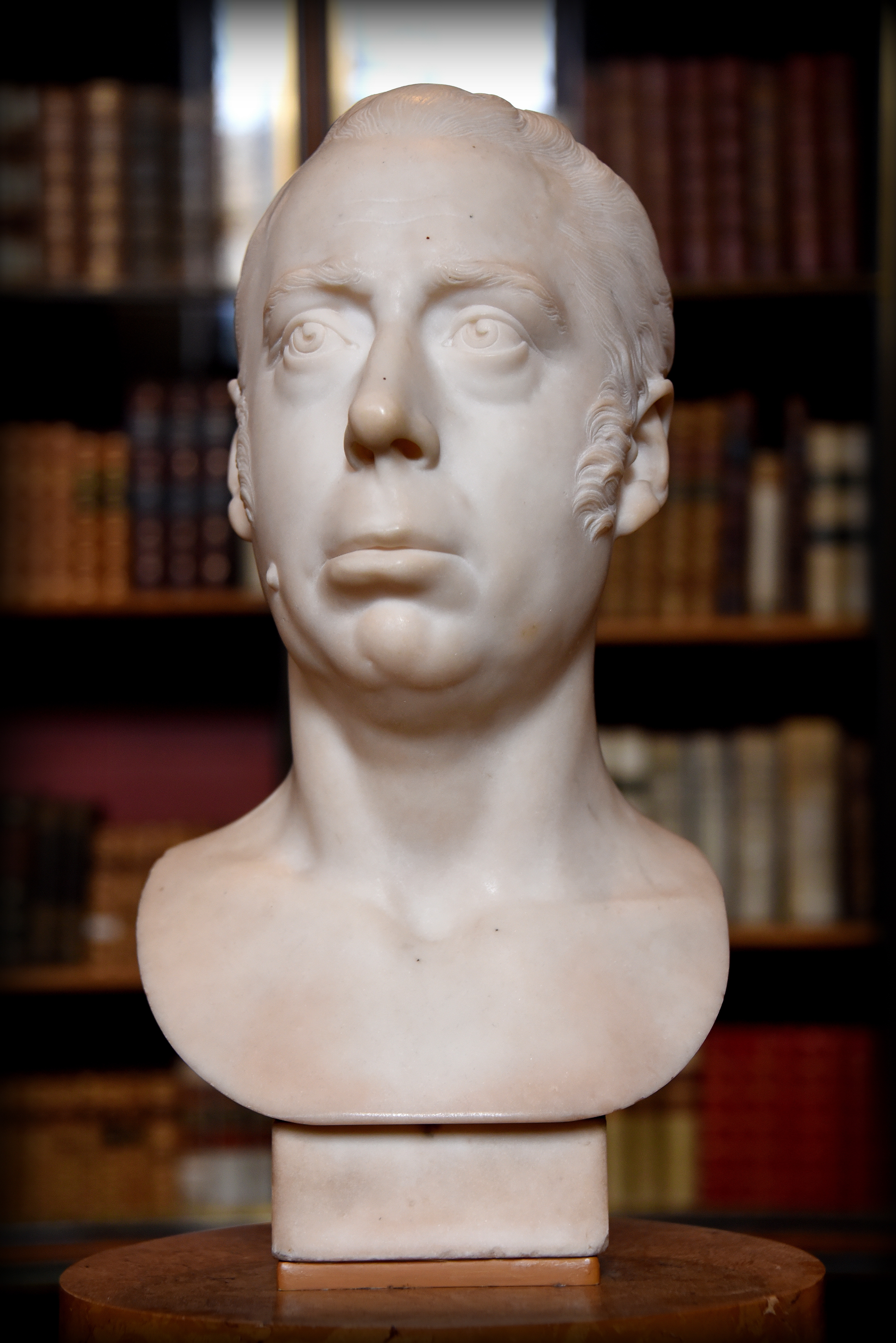
Bust of Payne Knight (1812) by John Bacon the Younger in the British Museum

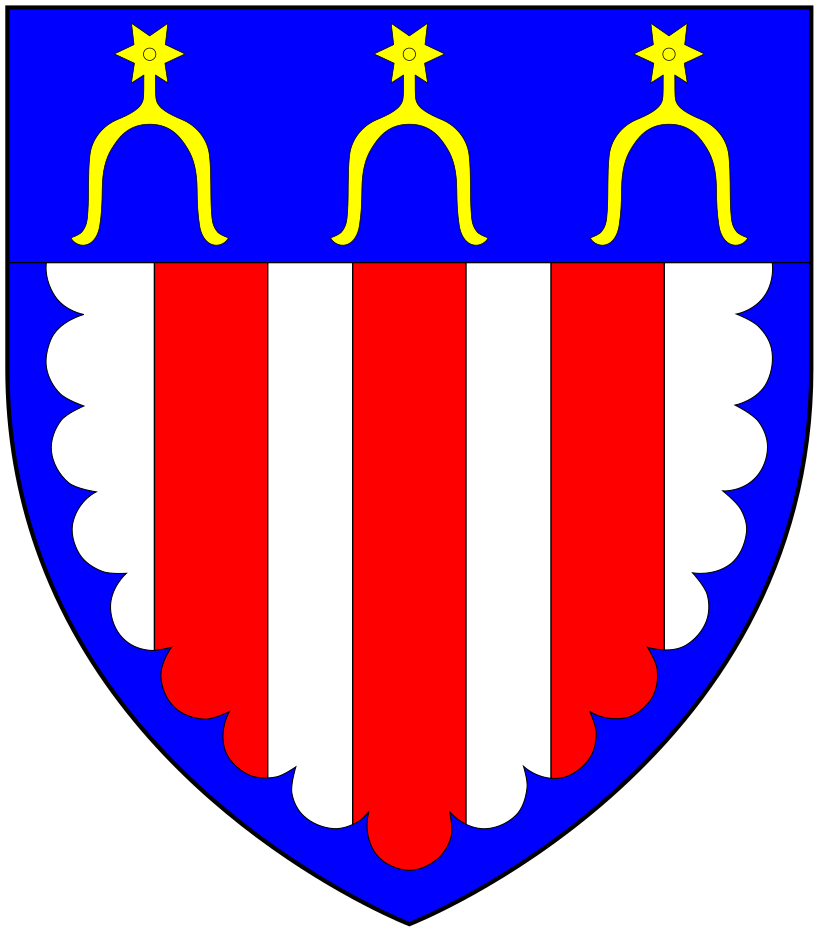
Arms of Knight: Argent, three pales gules within a bordure engrailed azure on a chief of the last three spurs or

Richard Payne Knight (11 February 1751 – 23 April 1824) of Downton Castle in Herefordshire, and of 5 Soho Square, London, England, was a classical scholar, connoisseur, archaeologist and numismatist best known for his theories of picturesque beauty and for his interest in ancient phallic imagery. He served as a Member of Parliament for Leominster in Herefordshire (1780–84) and for Ludlow in Shropshire(1784–1806).

== Origins ==
He was born at Wormsley Grange in Wormsley, 5 miles (8 km) north-west of Hereford in Herefordshire, the eldest son of Rev. Thomas Knight (1697–1764) of Wormsley Grange, Rector of Bewdley, Worcestershire, by his wife Ursula Nash, a daughter of Frederick Nash of Dinham, Shropshire. He was the heir not only of his father but also of his uncle Richard Knight (1693–1765) of Croft Castle. But of even more value, he was the heir of his grandfather, who founded the family's fortune, Richard Knight (1659–1745) of Downton Hall, a wealthy Ironmaster of Bringewood Ironworks. His younger brother was the horticulturist Thomas Andrew Knight.

== Career ==
He was educated privately at home. Due to ill health, his years of education were few, but his inherited wealth allowed him to supplement it with travel. For several years from 1767 he made the Grand Tour to Italy and the European continent. He was a collector of ancient bronzes and coins, and an author of numerous books and articles on ancient sculpture, coins and other artefacts. As a member of the Society of Dilettanti, Knight was widely considered to be an arbiter of taste. He expended much careful study on an edition of Homer.

He was a member of parliament from 1780 to 1806, more as a spectator than an active participant in the debates. Beginning in 1814, he occupied the Towneley family trustee seat at the British Museum, to which he bequeathed his collection of bronzes, coins, engraved gems, marbles, and drawings.

== Death and succession ==
Knight died unmarried on 23 April 1824, and was buried in the churchyard of St Mary's Church, Wormsley, where survives his chest tomb, now a grade II listed structure. His heir was his brother the botanist Thomas Andrew Knight, whose daughter the horticulturalist Charlotte Knight (c.1801-1843) eventually inherited Downton Castle, which passed to her descendants by her husband Sir William Edward Rouse-Boughton, 2nd and 10th Baronet (1788–1856), MP.

He bequeathed all his coins and medals to the British Museum, on condition that within one year after his decease, the next descendant in the direct male line, then living, of his grandfather, be made an hereditary trustee, "with all the privileges of the other family trustees, to be continued in perpetual succession to his next descendant, in the direct male line, so long as any shall exist; and in case of their failure, to the next in the female line".

== Will & Knight v. Knight (1840) ==
He made his will on 3 June 1814, leaving the property to his brother, Thomas Andrew Knight and in tail male to his male descendants. But if there were none, the property was to pass to the "next descendant in the direct male line of my late grandfather, Richard Knight of Downton". However, he also stated:

"I trust to the liberality of my successors to reward any others of my old servants and tenants according to their deserts, and to their justice in continuing the estates in the male succession, according to the will of the founder of the family, my above-named grandfather".

Were it not for these last words, his will appeared to have created a trust, which would have precluded Charlotte from inheriting, as her father Thomas Knight died intestate and without male progeny, having been pre-deceased by his only son. One of his male Knight cousins (namely John Knight (1765–1850) of Lea Castle, Wolverley, of 52 Portland Place and of Simonsbath House, Exmoor, Somerset) challenged Charlotte's right as a female to inherit under the terms of Payne's will, which resulted in the famous 1840 lawsuit Knight v Knight. The judge decided that due to these last words in Payne's will, it had not been his intention to create a trust and therefore Thomas had inherited from him an absolute title in his property, which thus passed by law to his daughter.

== Books ==
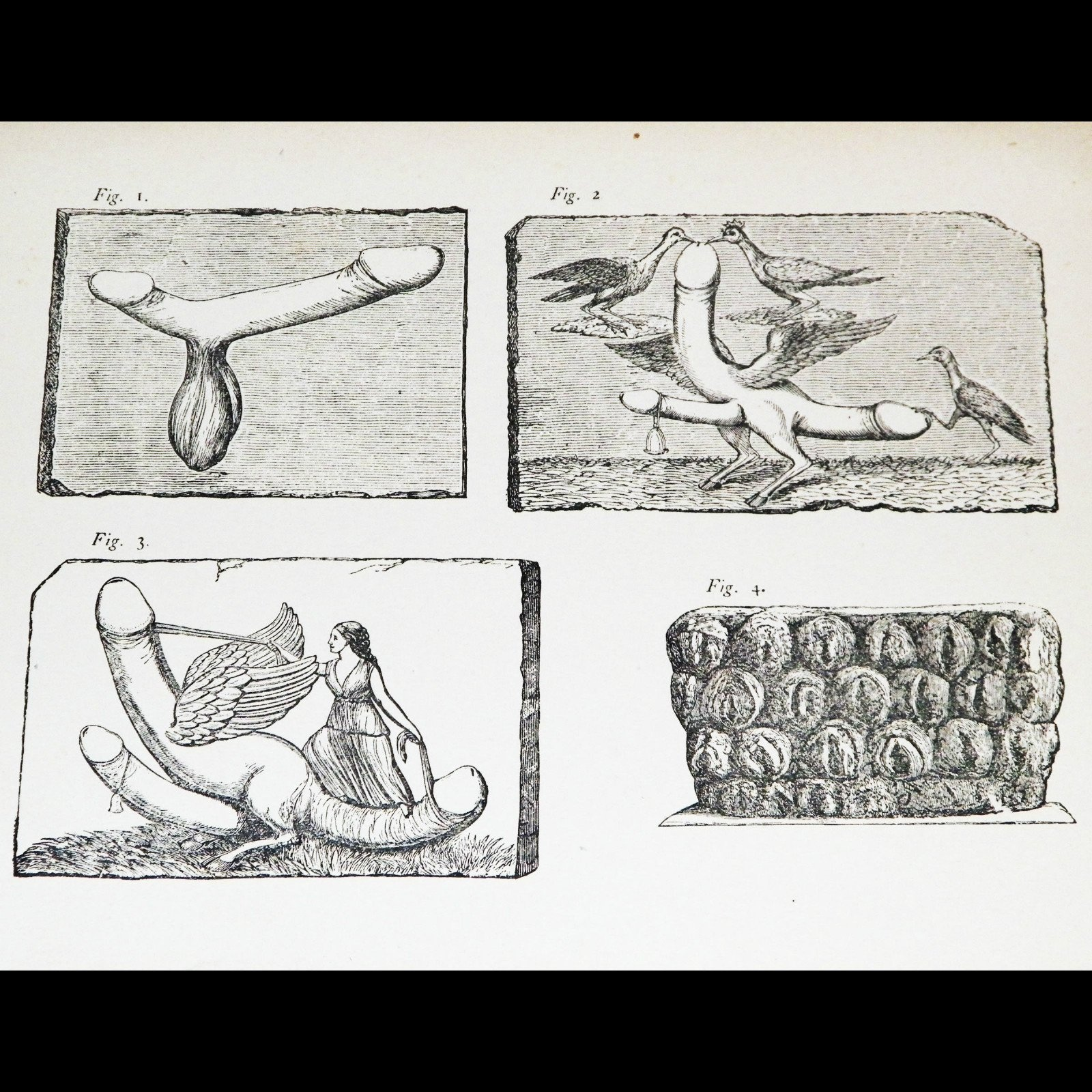
Four figures from Discourse on the worship of Priapus and its connection with the mystic theology of the ancients as republished by George Witt in 1865

Notoriously, Knight's first book, A Discourse on the Worship of Priapus (1786), sought to recover the importance of ancient phallic cults. Knight's apparent preference for ancient sacred eroticism over Judeo-Christian puritanism led to many attacks on him as an infidel and as a scholarly apologist for libertinism. This ensured the persistent distrust of the religious establishment. The central claim of The Worship of Priapus was that an international religious impulse to worship "the generative principle" was articulated through genital imagery, and that this imagery has persisted into the modern age. In some ways the book was the first of many later attempts to argue that Pagan ideas had persisted within Christian culture, a view that would eventually crystallise into the neo-Pagan movement over a century later.

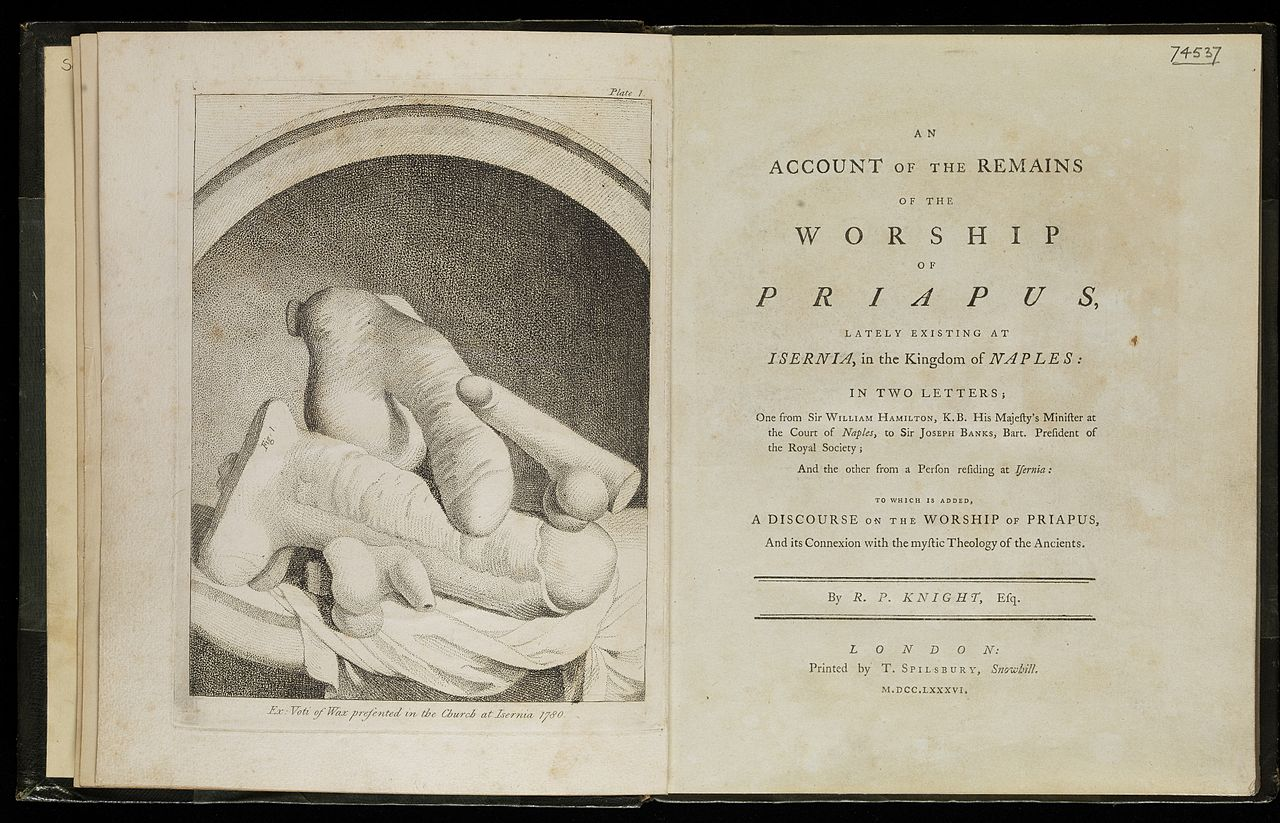
An Account of the Remains of the Worship of Priapus (1786).

Another book of interest to the neo-Pagan movement was Knight's Symbolical Language of Ancient Art and Mythology.

An Analytical Inquiry into the Principles of Taste, 1805, was, however, Knight's most influential work in his lifetime. This book sought to explain the experience of "taste" within the mind and to clarify the theorisation of the concept of the picturesque, following from the writings of William Gilpin and Uvedale Price on the subject. Knight's views on the aesthetics of the picturesque are also formed in engagement with Edmund Burke's emphasis on the importance of sensation, which Knight partly rejects in favour of a modified associationism. The philosophical basis of Knight's theories have implications for his account of the relationship between the "beautiful" and the "picturesque". For Knight, aesthetic concepts cannot be formed directly from optical sensations, because these must be interpreted within the mind before they can be recognised as beautiful. Thus a Classical architecture Roman temple is beautiful because of the proportions of its parts, but these proportions can never be perceived directly by the senses, which will simply encounter a mass of confused impressions. "Beauty" is thus a product of internal mental acts. It is therefore proper to speak of moral, mathematical and other non-sensuous forms of beauty, contrary to Burke, Hogarth and others who claimed such usages were metaphorical. In all cases "the particular object [e.g. proportion] is an abstract idea."

== Visual arts ==
For Knight, "picturesque" means simply "after the manner of painting", a point that is important to his further discussion of sensation, which in his view is central to the understanding of painting and music, which are "addressed to the organs of sight and hearing", while poetry and sculpture appeal "entirely to the imagination and passions." The latter must be understood in terms of associations of ideas, while the former rely on the "irritation" or friction of sensitive parts of the body. Knight's view was that artists should seek to reproduce primal visual sensations, not the mental interpretative processes which give rise to abstract ideas.

For Knight, colour is experienced directly as pleasurable sensation. A pure blue is not pleasurable because it reminds us of clear skies, as Price supposed, but because of the experience itself. Interpretation of impressions follows chains of association following from this primal sensory experience. However, the pleasures of sense may be "modified by habit", so that the pure stimulus of colour may be experienced as pleasurable when "under the influence of mind" which perceives its meaningful use within a painting. Excess of pure colour is painful, like any other sensory excess. Variety and combination of colours is most pleasurable.

Knight makes much of the need to fragment an image into tonal and colouristic "masses", a view that has been claimed to anticipate the late work of Turner, or even Impressionism. However, it most directly justifies the practices of contemporary painters of picturesque landscapes, such as Girtin, whose stippling effects are comparable to Knight's account of pleasing colour combinations. Knight commissioned landscape artist, Thomas Hearne to produce several drawings of the grounds of his home, Downton Castle in Herefordshire.

On sculpture – typically for him, colourless form – generates in the mind the idea of shape which we must conceptualise, as with "proportion". The literary arts, like sculpture, deal with thoughts and emotions, though in a more complex form. Knight's account of these arts therefore falls under the heading of "association of ideas". Here Knight shows the influence of the contemporary cult of sensibility, arguing that these arts engage our sympathies, and in so doing demonstrate the inadequacy of 2rules and systems" in both morality and aesthetics. These teach "men to work by rule, instead of by feeling and observation." Rule-based knowledge of wrong cannot prevent wrongdoing, because it is thought not felt. Therefore, "it is impossible that tragedy should exhibit examples of pure and strict morality, without becoming dull and uninteresting."

Knight's discussion of "the passions" engages with both Classical and recent theorisations of sentiments. His discussion of the sublime is directed against Burke's emphasis on feelings of terror and powerlessness. Knight defends Longinus's original account of sublimity, which he summarises as the "energetic exertion of great and commanding power". Again he intertwines social and aesthetic reasoning, asserting that the power of a tyrant cannot be sublime if the tyrant inspires fear by mere arbitrary whim, like Nero. However, it may be sublime if his tyranny, like Napoleon's, derives from the exercise of immense personal capacities. A Nero may be feared, but would also be despised. A Napoleon may be hated, but will nevertheless inspire awe. In art, the mind experiences the sublime as it experiences the exercise of its own powers, or sympathises with the exercises of the powers of others. Fear itself can never engender the sublime.

Knight's emphasis on the roles of sensation and of emotion were constitutive of later Romantic and Victorian aesthetic thinking, as was his vexed struggle with the relation between moral feeling and sensuous pleasure. Though some contemporaries condemned the basis of his thought as an aestheticised libertinism, or devotion to physical sensation, they influenced John Ruskin's attempts to theorise the Romantic aesthetic of Turner, and to integrate political and pictorial values.

== See also ==
- Knight v Knight (1840) 3 Beav 148

== Notes ==
Parliament of Great Britain
| Preceded by Frederick Cornewall and Viscount Bateman | Member of Parliament for Leominster; 1780–1784; With: Viscount Bateman | Succeeded by John Hunter and Penn Assheton Curzon |
| Preceded by Somerset Davies; Lord Clive | Member for Ludlow; 1784–1800; With: Lord Clive 1774–1794; Robert Clive from 1794 | Succeeded by Parliament of the United Kingdom |
Parliament of the United Kingdom
| Preceded by Parliament of Great Britain | Member for Ludlow; 1801–1806; With: Robert Clive 1794–1807 | Succeeded by Viscount Clive; Robert Clive |
