= Lea Castle, England =

Listed Neo-Gothic mock castle

Coordinates: 52.41191°N 2.23455°W

Lea Castle
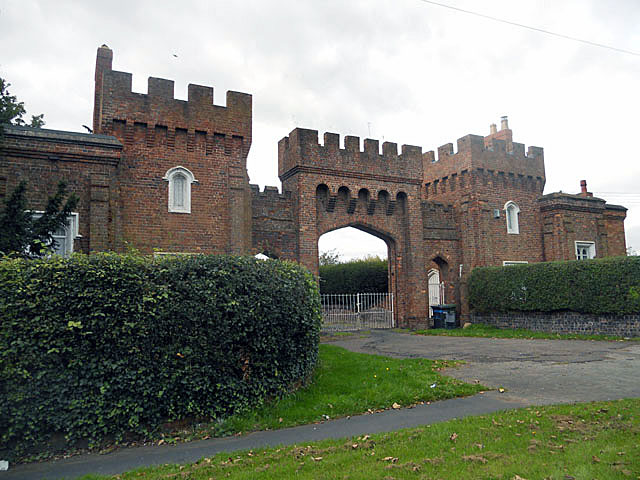
- Surviving gatehouse in 2010

General information
- Architectural style: Neo Gothic
- Location: Wolverley, England, United Kingdom
- Completed: 1762
- Demolished: Partly in 1945

Design and construction
- Architect: Edward Knight

Lea Castle is a ruined Grade II listed Neo Gothic mock castle mansion near Wolverley, England.

== History ==
Lea Castle was built by Edward Knight in 1762. John Brown bought the house in 1823. By 1848 it was owned by the Brown-Westhead family.

The house was auctioned in 1933 but by 1939 it was dilapidated. Lea Castle was then partially demolished in 1945. It was designated as a Scheduled Monument on June 15, 2003. Today, only the north lodges and gateway survive, dating to the 19th and 20th centuries.
