= Franz Nadorp =

German painter

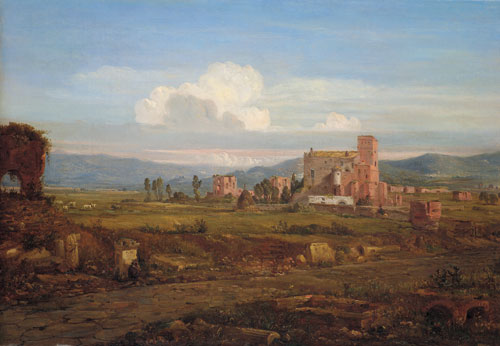
Landscape of the Roman Campagna by Franz Nadorp, Galerie Bassenge, Berlin

Franz Johann Heinrich Nadorp (June 23, 1794 – September 17, 1876) was a German painter who worked and lived primarily in Rome.

Nadorp was born in Anholt into a family of artists. He was the only son of Johann Theodor Nadorp and Gertrud Anna Stroof. After his education at the Anholt City school, he was joined at age 20 by a fellowship of his country gentlemen Prince Constantin of Salm-Salm in the Academy of Fine Arts, Prague, where he trained as a historical painter with his teacher Joseph Bergler. Nadorp was the favourite pupil of Bergler. In 1822 he received the gold medal of the Academy. When in 1826 his mentor died, Nadorp left Prague and returned to his hometown district of Anholt for a few months in 1827.

In the autumn of 1827 Nadorp travelled with his companions Prince Franz of Salm-Salm to Rome. The city of Rome drew many German artists at the time, such as Peter von Cornelius, Johann Friedrich Overbeck and Julius Schnorr von Carolsfeld. Nadorp became a member of the group of German artists, called the "Nazarenes". He was one of the founders of the Roman Künstlerbund (1829) and the German Artists' Union (1845). The years 1840 to 1850 are among his most fertile. Numerous drawings survive.

During this time, Nadorp met King Ludwig I of Bavaria, and they formed a friendship. 1859 Nadorp was received by King Frederick William IV of Prussia, and this led to his first government contract. Nadorp left Rome only rarely in the nearly 50 years of local work. In 1862 he returned to his hometown for a short time. For his baptismal church of St. Pancras, he created an altarpiece The Presentation of Jesus in the Temple and drew the old town church shortly before its demolition. In 1876 Prince Alfred I of Salm-Salm granted him an annuity.

Nadorp, who is considered a romantic German painter in style, died shortly thereafter in Rome and was buried at Campo Santo Teutonico next to St. Peter in the Vatican. His entire estate was transferred to the Princes of Salm-Salm and can still be seen today in the Museum Wasserburg Anholt and in the parish church of St. Pancras.
