= Downton Castle =

Country house in Herefordshire, England

Coordinates: 52.3678°N 2.8164°W

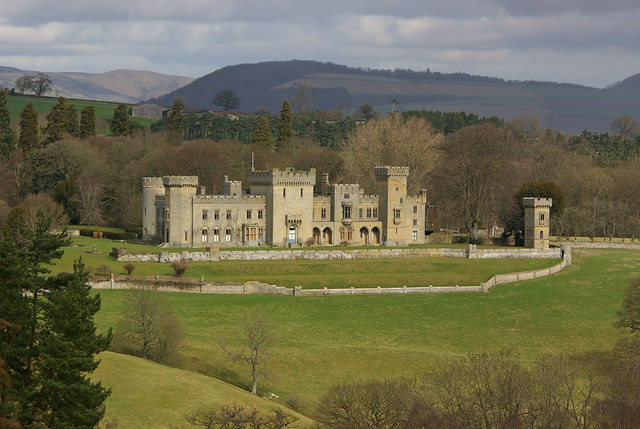
Downton Castle in 2010

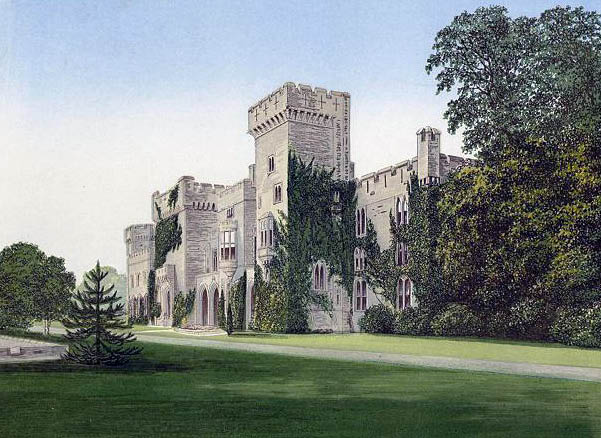
Downton Castle in 1880

Downton Castle is a grade I listed 18th-century country house in the parish of Downton on the Rock in Herefordshire, England, situated about 5 miles (8.0 km) west of Ludlow, Shropshire.

== Description ==
The south-facing entrance front has a central square tower, six bays to the left terminating in an octagonal tower and five bays to the right flanked by a square tower, the whole resembling a medieval castle with embattled parapets. Pevsner considered the inspiration to be the French semi-fortified houses in paintings by Claude Lorraine or Gaspard Poussin.

== History ==
The castle was begun by Bishop Henry of Blois (1096-1171) in 1138 in a campaign of castle building that saw five other castles begun the same year. The estate of Downton was acquired by Richard Knight (1659–1749) a wealthy ironmaster from Madeley, Shropshire, and proprietor of the Bringewood Ironworks. It passed to his grandson the art connoisseur and MP Richard Payne Knight (1750-1824), who rebuilt the house in the Gothic Revival style. Payne Knight was an enthusiast of the picturesque style, and commissioned the landscape artist Thomas Hearne to produce drawings of the grounds. Construction started in 1772/3 and was largely completed by 1778.

In 1824 the estate was inherited by the horticulturalist Charlotte Knight (c.1801-1843), niece of Payne Knight, the daughter and heiress of his brother, the botanist Thomas Andrew Knight. She was the wife of Sir William Edward Rouse-Boughton, 2nd and 10th Baronet (1788-1856), of Downton Hall, Stanton Lacy, Shropshire, (about 6 miles (9.7 km) to the NE of Downton Castle), a Member of Parliament for Evesham in Worcestershire. As her eldest son was heir to his father's estates and two baronetcies, she bequeathed the Downton Castle estate to their second son Andrew Johnes Rouse-Boughton-Knight (1826-1909), who in 1857 adopted the additional surname of Knight. He served as High Sheriff of Herefordshire in 1860 and at that time began improvements and extensions to the house, including a new entrance and porch, a north west tower, and a chapel. He added terraced gardens in 1865 to the design of W.A. Nesfield. In 1881 the family resided there with twelve servants. He died at Downton Castle in 1909.

During the Second World War, pupils from Lancing College, a boarding school on the South Coast, were evacuated to Downton Castle as the school was taken over as a naval training facility, HMS King Alfred. The castle remained in the possession of the Payne-Knight family until 1986 when it was sold along with its 5,000 acre (2,000 hectare) estate to the Primat family, co-heirs to the Schlumberger fortune. It remains a private home and is not open to the public.

== See also ==
- Knight v Knight — 1840 legal suit over the inheritance of Downton Castle
