= Downton, Herefordshire =

Civil parish in Herefordshire, England

Coordinates: 52.354°N 2.840°W

Downton
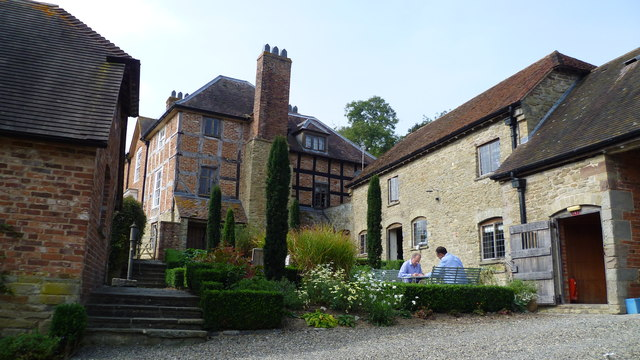
- Old Downton Lodge

- Location within Herefordshire
- Population: 65 (United Kingdom Census 2001)
- OS grid reference: SO427733
- Civil parish: Downton
- Unitary authority: Herefordshire
- Region: West Midlands
- Country: England
- Sovereign state: United Kingdom
- Post town: Ludlow
- Postcode district: SY8
- Dialling code: 01568
- Police: West Mercia
- Fire: Hereford and Worcester
- Ambulance: West Midlands
- UK Parliament: Hereford and South Herefordshire

Downton is a civil parish in Herefordshire, located in the north of the county and containing the village of Downton-on-the-Rock. It is part of the Leintwardine group of parishes and shares a parish council with Leintwardine and Burrington. In the Domesday Book Downton is referred to as "Duntune", meaning "hill settlement". At Downton Gorge the River Teme cuts through a limestone ridge; above the gorge is Downton Castle, an 18th-century country house with a tower built to resemble a castle.
