= Elton, Herefordshire =

Hamlet in Herefordshire, England

Coordinates: 52.335°N 2.798°W

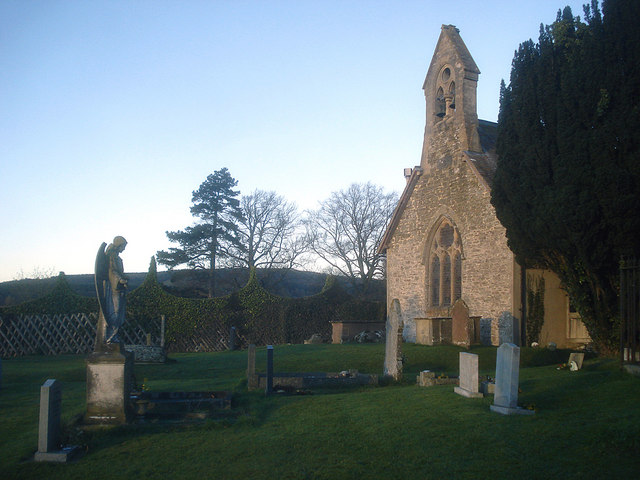
St Mary's Churchyard in Elton

Elton is a hamlet and civil parish in Herefordshire. It is situated on the Wigmore to Ludlow road.

The village is northeast of Leinthall Starkes and south of Pipe Aston.

National Cycle Network route 44 passes through, en route between Ludlow and Leominster.
