= Bringewood Ironworks =

Coordinates: 52.3703°N 2.8034°W

Bringewood Ironworks was a charcoal ironworks in north Herefordshire. It was powered by the river Teme, with a blast furnace, a finery forge and latterly a rolling mill for blackplate (to be tinned into tinplate).

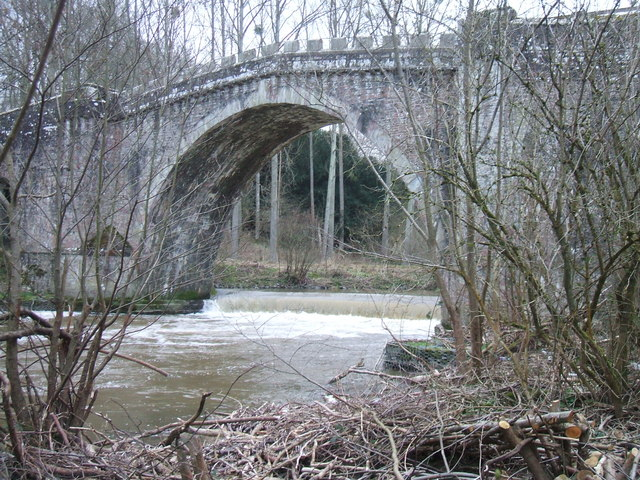
The Forge Bridge at Bringewood Forge, c.1772

It was probably built for Robert Dudley, 1st Earl of Leicester in the 1590s, but reverted to the Crown on his attainder, and was then let to Sir Henry Wallop. However, he evidently sublet it to working ironmasters. By 1623, it was run by Francis Walker, and continued to be operated by his descendants until the bankruptcy of Job Walker in 1695. They were also concerned in a number of other ironworks in southern and central Shropshire.

About 1695, the ironworks, consisting of a blast furnace and a forge, was acquired by Richard Knight (1659–1745). He and then his sons gradually expanded their activities, acquiring ironworks in the valley of the River Stour. Richard Knight retired in about 1733, after which the works were managed by his son Ralph Knight for a family partnership with his brother Edward (1699–1780). After his death, the works passed to Edward, who ran them in partnership with his sons John (1740–1795) and James, managed by the latter. Their interest in the works ceased on Edward's death in 1778.

Richard Knight had two other sons another Richard Knight (1693–1765) and Thomas Knight (1697–1764), the latter being the father of Richard Payne Knight MP (1750–1824) and Thomas Andrew Knight FRS (1759–1838). John Knight was father of Thomas Knight (1775–1853), who was active in publishing on mathematics, notably in Philosophical Transactions of the Royal Society of London (seven papers, something of a record for an otherwise quiet period). None of these descendants were directly concerned in the iron industry. However, because of the settlement of inheritance within the Knight family, Richard Payne Knight had a pecuniary interest that influenced the development of the family's ironworks; decisions were made in the interests of securing income that might not always have secured the iron industry.

The works were put into repair in 1782 and run by William Downing of Pembridge with a various partners, passing to ultimately Samuel George. The 1782 lease expired in 1815. This coincided with a depression in the iron industry at the end of the Napoleonic War. This seems to mark its closure. The furnace had probably closed in the 1790s, when Samuel George built at furnace at Knowbury close to Titterstone Clee Hill.

From about 1740, in addition to the furnace and forge, there was a rolling mill further downstream, which produced blackplate, which was sent to a tinmill at Mitton (now in Stourport) to be made into tinplate. The name of a nearby wood suggests that tinplate may have been produced at Bringewood. However, this can only have been after period of the Knights' occupation of the works, as the surviving accounts (for 1733–78) show only blackplate being produced.

Wood (for charcoal) came from the nearby chases of Bringewood, Mocktree and Darvel. Though the possibility of mining locally is mentioned in some leases, it is probable that the main source of ore was Titterstone Clee Hill. Pig iron, bar iron and blackplate, made in the works were carried by land to Bewdley for sale, so far as not sold locally. Bringewood bar iron enjoyed a high reputation as being tough.
