= Grade I listed buildings in Herefordshire =

Herefordshire shown in England

There are over 9,000 Grade I listed buildings in England. This page is a list of these buildings in the county of Herefordshire.

== County of Herefordshire ==
Name	Location	Type	Completed (Note: The date given is the date used by Historic England as significant for the initial building or that of an important part in the structure's description.)	Date designated	Grid ref. (Note: The grid reference is based on the British national grid reference system, sometimes known as OSGB36, used by the Ordnance Survey.) Geo-coordinates	Entry number (Note: The "List Entry Number" is a unique number assigned to each listed building and scheduled monument by Historic England.)	Image
Church of St Mary	Abbey Dore	Abbey	Late 12th century to Early 13th century	26 January 1962	SO3871730401; 51°58′07″N 2°53′36″W	1099794	Church of St Mary More images
Wigmore Abbey ruins	Adforton	Abbey	Late 12th century	11 June 1959	SO4106771308; 52°20′12″N 2°51′59″W	1179921	Wigmore Abbey ruins More images
Wigmore Abbey Grange	Adforton	Grange	12th century	11 June 1959	SO4104171274; 52°20′11″N 2°52′00″W	1082057	Wigmore Abbey Grange More images
Wigmore Abbey Grange gatehouse	Adforton	Gatehouse	14th century	11 June 1959	SO4101271270; 52°20′11″N 2°52′02″W	1349753	Wigmore Abbey Grange gatehouse
Wigmore Abbey Grange outbuilding	Adforton	Gatehouse	14th century with later alterations	11 June 1959	SO4092371320; 52°20′12″N 2°52′07″W	1082061	Upload Photo
Wigmore Abbey Grange storage building	Adforton	Storehouse	14th century with later alterations	11 June 1959	SO4090571309; 52°20′12″N 2°52′07″W	1179912	Upload Photo
Church of St Mary	Almeley	Church	Later alterations	2 September 1966	SO3327451501; 52°09′28″N 2°58′36″W	1081702	Church of St Mary More images
Church of St John the Baptist and St Alkmund	Aymestrey	Church	12th century	11 June 1959	SO4260265130; 52°16′53″N 2°50′34″W	1082113	Church of St John the Baptist and St Alkmund More images
Church of St Peter	Birley, Birley with Upper Hill	Church	13th century	2 September 1966	SO4535653354; 52°10′33″N 2°48′02″W	1081970	Church of St Peter More images
Bell tower at Church of the Holy Trinity	Bosbury	Bell tower	13th century	26 March 1986	SO6955843420; 52°05′18″N 2°26′45″W	1349189	Bell tower at Church of the Holy Trinity More images
Church of the Holy Trinity	Bosbury	Church	Early 12th century	6 March 1972	SO6954943451; 52°05′19″N 2°26′45″W	1098890	Church of the Holy Trinity More images
Brampton Bryan Castle	Brampton Bryan	Castle	Early 14th century	11 June 1959	SO3703072577; 52°20′51″N 2°55′33″W	1082066	Brampton Bryan Castle More images
Church of St Barnabas	Brampton Bryan	Bell tower	19th century	11 June 1959	SO3704872514; 52°20′49″N 2°55′32″W	1179943	Church of St Barnabas More images
Hall ruins about 10 yards North of Brampton Bryan Castle	Brampton Bryan	House	Early 14th century	11 June 1959	SO3703072596; 52°20′52″N 2°55′33″W	1301697	Hall ruins about 10 yards North of Brampton Bryan Castle
Church of St Andrew	Bridge Sollers	Church	12th century	2 September 1966	SO4147842615; 52°04′44″N 2°51′19″W	1157590	Church of St Andrew More images
Wilton Castle ruins and House attached to South	Wilton, Bridstow	Castle	c. 1300	18 May 1953	SO5900624371; 51°54′59″N 2°35′51″W	1214349	Wilton Castle ruins and House attached to South More images
Brinsop Court	Brinsop	House	14th century	20 February 1953	SO4460345792; 52°06′28″N 2°48′37″W	1349793	Brinsop Court More images
Church of St George	Brinsop	Church	12th century	2 September 1966	SO4423344791; 52°05′55″N 2°48′56″W	1081971	Church of St George More images
Church of St Mary	Monnington on Wye, Brobury with Monnington on Wye	Church	15th century	2 September 1966	SO3735543325; 52°05′05″N 2°54′56″W	1349851	Church of St Mary More images
Church of All Saints	Brockhampton	Church	1901-1902	25 February 1966	SO5941332147; 51°59′11″N 2°35′33″W	1349021	Church of All Saints More images
Gatehouse South West of Lower Brockhampton House	Brockhampton	Gatehouse	Late 15th century	12 April 1973	SO6874155979; 52°12′04″N 2°27′32″W	1082376	Gatehouse South West of Lower Brockhampton House More images
Lower Brockhampton House	Brockhampton	House	Late 14th century or early 15th century	9 April 1952	SO6875356002; 52°12′05″N 2°27′31″W	1176676	Lower Brockhampton House More images
Church of St Peter	Bromyard, Bromyard and Winslow	Church	Late 12th century	25 October 1951	SO6554154842; 52°11′27″N 2°30′20″W	1307758	Church of St Peter More images
Church of St John the Baptist	Byford	Church	12th century	2 September 1966	SO3971742917; 52°04′53″N 2°52′52″W	1349866	Church of St John the Baptist More images
Church of St Lawrence	Canon Pyon	Church	13th century	2 September 1966	SO4500849176; 52°08′17″N 2°48′18″W	1081974	Church of St Lawrence More images
Church of St Michael	Castle Frome	Church	12th century	6 March 1967	SO6675845868; 52°06′36″N 2°29′13″W	1098869	Church of St Michael More images
Church of All Saints	Clehonger	Church	12th century	26 January 1967	SO4654637949; 52°02′14″N 2°46′50″W	1301135	Church of All Saints More images
Clifford Castle and Barbican	Clifford	Castle	Late 13th century	17 January 1949	SO2434945677; 52°06′15″N 3°06′21″W	1167903	Clifford Castle and Barbican More images
Church of St Mary	Credenhill	Church	12th century	27 January 1967	SO4503043882; 52°05′26″N 2°48′13″W	1168027	Church of St Mary More images
Church of St Michael	Croft Castle, Croft and Yarpole	Church	Mid 14th century	11 June 1959	SO4498665427; 52°17′03″N 2°48′28″W	1166506	Church of St Michael More images
Croft Castle	Croft and Yarpole	House	Late 16th century to early 17th century	8 November 1956	SO4494365435; 52°17′03″N 2°48′31″W	1166451	Croft Castle More images
Tower about 15 metres South of Church of St Leonard	Yarpole, Croft and Yarpole	Bell tower	13th century	11 December 1987	SO4697464844; 52°16′45″N 2°46′43″W	1081790	Tower about 15 metres South of Church of St Leonard More images
Church of St Mary	Dilwyn	Church	c. 1200	2 September 1966	SO4152154674; 52°11′14″N 2°51′25″W	1349814	Church of St Mary More images
Downton Castle and adjoining Stable Courtyard	Downton	House	c1774-8	11 May 1987	SO4451174733; 52°22′04″N 2°48′59″W	1081758	Downton Castle and adjoining Stable Courtyard More images
Church of St. Mary Magdalene	Eardisley	Church	12th century	16 October 1967	SO3124049127; 52°08′10″N 3°00′22″W	1349544	Church of St. Mary Magdalene More images
Church of St John the Baptist	Eastnor	Church	12th century	18 November 1952	SO7313437227; 52°01′58″N 2°23′35″W	1266756	Church of St John the Baptist More images
Eastnor Castle	Eastnor	House	1811-1820	18 November 1952	SO7350036876; 52°01′47″N 2°23′16″W	1156712	Eastnor Castle More images
Church of St Michael and All Angels	Eaton Bishop	Church	11th century	26 January 1967	SO4430439104; 52°02′51″N 2°48′49″W	1099705	Church of St Michael and All Angels More images
Berrington Hall and adjoining Outbuildings	Eye, Moreton and Ashton	House	1778-c1781	11 June 1959	SO5093063660; 52°16′08″N 2°43′14″W	1082564	Berrington Hall and adjoining Outbuildings More images
Church of St Peter and St Paul	Eye, Eye, Moreton and Ashton	Church	Late 12th century	11 June 1959	SO4964063809; 52°16′12″N 2°44′22″W	1166756	Church of St Peter and St Paul More images
Eye Manor	Eye, Moreton and Ashton	House	1673	11 June 1959	SO4960963842; 52°16′13″N 2°44′24″W	1349522	Eye Manor More images
Church of St Mary	Fownhope	Church	1881	26 January 1967	SO5810334273; 52°00′19″N 2°36′42″W	1099890	Church of St Mary More images
Church of St Mary	Foy	Church	13th century	25 February 1966	SO5979228348; 51°57′08″N 2°35′11″W	1157820	Church of St Mary More images
Church of St Michael	Garway	Church	12th century	1 March 1960	SO4550522482; 51°53′54″N 2°47′36″W	1099751	Church of St Michael More images
Garway Dovecote	Garway	Dovecote	14th century	1 March 1960	SO4554022413; 51°53′51″N 2°47′34″W	1348781	Garway Dovecote More images
Flanesford Priory	Goodrich	Monastery	1346	25 February 1966	SO5790719381; 51°52′17″N 2°36′46″W	1157248	Flanesford Priory More images
Goodrich Castle	Goodrich	Castle	Early 14th century	14 February 1966	SO5771119987; 51°52′37″N 2°36′57″W	1348917	Goodrich Castle More images
Church of St Andrew	Hampton Bishop	Church	15th century or 16th century	26 January 1967	SO5588638011; 52°02′19″N 2°38′40″W	1301948	Church of St Andrew More images
St Catherine's Church	Hoarwithy	Church	c. 1840	26 March 1987	SO5457429405; 51°57′41″N 2°39′45″W	1214570	St Catherine's Church More images
Cathedral Church of St Mary and St Ethelbert	Hereford	Cathedral	11th century to 15th century	10 June 1952	SO5099939790; 52°03′16″N 2°42′58″W	1196808	Cathedral Church of St Mary and St Ethelbert More images
College of Vicars Choral	Hereford	Ecclesiastical building	c. 1473	10 June 1952	SO5105139694; 52°03′12″N 2°42′55″W	1196809	College of Vicars Choral More images
The Old House	Hereford	House	c. 1621	10 June 1952	SO5108140032; 52°03′23″N 2°42′54″W	1207754	The Old House More images
Wye Bridge	Hereford	Bridge	Late 15th century	10 June 1952	SO5081139595; 52°03′09″N 2°43′07″W	1196768	Wye Bridge More images
Church of St Cuthbert	Holme Lacy	Church	13th century	26 January 1967	SO5684834736; 52°00′34″N 2°37′48″W	1099563	Church of St Cuthbert More images
Holme Lacy House	Holme Lacy	House	1674	26 January 1967	SO5546534968; 52°00′41″N 2°39′01″W	1348852	Holme Lacy House More images
Church of St Bartholomew	Holmer and Shelwick	Church	Late 12th century	27 January 1967	SO5053142404; 52°04′40″N 2°43′24″W	1099290	Church of St Bartholomew More images
Hampton Court	Hope under Dinmore	House	1427-36	11 June 1959	SO5204952426; 52°10′05″N 2°42′09″W	1157291	Hampton Court More images
Church of St Michael	Kenchester	Church	Late 12th century	27 January 1967	SO4341343247; 52°05′05″N 2°49′38″W	1172691	Church of St Michael More images
Kentchurch Court	Kentchurch	Castle	14th century	29 September 1952	SO4231125905; 51°55′43″N 2°50′25″W	1157632	Kentchurch Court More images
Church of St Mary and St David	Kilpeck	Church	c1134-40	26 January 1967	SO4451030514; 51°58′13″N 2°48′33″W	1099582	Church of St Mary and St David More images
Church of St John the Baptist	King's Caple	Church	13th century	25 February 1966	SO5589128836; 51°57′23″N 2°38′36″W	1349008	Church of St John the Baptist More images
Church of St Mary	King's Pyon	Church	12th century	2 September 1966	SO4386550625; 52°09′04″N 2°49′19″W	1179970	Church of St Mary More images
Church of St Michael	Kingsland	Church	13th century	11 June 1959	SO4468361287; 52°14′49″N 2°48′42″W	1167022	Church of St Michael More images
Church of St Mary	Kington	Church	c. 1300	8 October 1953	SO2913556762; 52°12′16″N 3°02′18″W	1208031	Church of St Mary More images
Church of St James	Kinnersley	Church	C12, 13th century and 14th century	2 September 1966	SO3455649618; 52°08′27″N 2°57′28″W	1157630	Church of St James More images
Church of St Andrew	Leysters (or Laysters)	Church	12th century	11 June 1959	SO5683763250; 52°15′57″N 2°38′02″W	1166945	Church of St Andrew More images
Church of St Michael and All Angels, Including the detached Bell Tower	Ledbury	Church	c. 1230	18 September 1953	SO7128137697; 52°02′13″N 2°25′12″W	1301825	Church of St Michael and All Angels, Including the detached Bell Tower More images
Ledbury Park	Ledbury Park, Ledbury	House	1590	18 September 1953	SO7113837564; 52°02′09″N 2°25′20″W	1180078	Ledbury Park More images
Ledbury Market Hall	Ledbury	Market hall	c. 1617	18 September 1953	SO7110237708; 52°02′13″N 2°25′22″W	1349392	Ledbury Market Hall More images
Church of St Mary Magdalene	Leintwardine	Church	1865	11 June 1959	SO4046274095; 52°21′42″N 2°52′33″W	1349757	Church of St Mary Magdalene More images
Priory Church of St Peter and St Paul	Leominster	Church	13th century	24 July 1954	SO4985259278; 52°13′46″N 2°44′08″W	1077617	Priory Church of St Peter and St Paul More images
Church of St John the Baptist	Letton	Church	C12, C13 and 14th century	2 September 1966	SO3351246451; 52°06′45″N 2°58′20″W	1157735	Church of St John the Baptist More images
Church of St Mary	Linton	Church	12th century	17 March 1987	SO6602125332; 51°55′32″N 2°29′44″W	1167319	Church of St Mary More images
Church of St Deinst	Llangarron	Church	14th century	26 February 1966	SO5303721169; 51°53′14″N 2°41′02″W	1348911	Church of St Deinst More images
Church of St Clodock	Clodock, Longtown	Church	12th century	26 January 1967	SO3264827513; 51°56′31″N 2°58′52″W	1078150	Church of St Clodock More images
Church of the Nativity of the Blessed Virgin Mary	Madley	Church	12th century	26 January 1962	SO4199838720; 52°02′38″N 2°50′50″W	1348768	Church of the Nativity of the Blessed Virgin Mary More images
Amberley Court	Amberley, Marden	House	Early 14th century	20 October 1952	SO5458047808; 52°07′36″N 2°39′54″W	1302188	Amberley Court More images
Church of St Mary	Marden	Church	13th century and 14th century	26 January 1967	SO5118047057; 52°07′11″N 2°42′52″W	1302203	Church of St Mary More images
Church of St Mary	Middleton on the Hill	Church	12th century	11 June 1959	SO5405264606; 52°16′40″N 2°40′30″W	1167020	Church of St Mary More images
Church of St Michael and All Angels	Moccas Park, Moccas	Church	Mid 12th century	2 September 1966	SO3574343275; 52°05′03″N 2°56′21″W	1157759	Church of St Michael and All Angels More images
Moccas Court	Moccas Park, Moccas	House	1775-81	2 September 1966	SO3577043533; 52°05′11″N 2°56′20″W	1081852	Moccas Court More images
Church of Saints Cosmas and Damian	Stretford, Monkland and Stretford	Church	12th century	2 September 1966	SO4435055741; 52°11′49″N 2°48′56″W	1349846	Church of Saints Cosmas and Damian More images
Church of St Mary	Much Cowarne	Church	Early 13th century	9 June 1967	SO6186347133; 52°07′16″N 2°33′30″W	1082241	Church of St Mary More images
Church of St David	Much Dewchurch	Church	12th century	26 January 1967	SO4822431117; 51°58′34″N 2°45′19″W	1348822	Church of St David More images
The Mynde	Much Dewchurch	House	15th century and 16th century	20 October 1952	SO4706829726; 51°57′49″N 2°46′18″W	1348825	The Mynde More images
Church of St Bartholomew	Much Marcle	Church	C13-C15	6 March 1967	SO6570832746; 51°59′32″N 2°30′03″W	1156241	Church of St Bartholomew More images
Homme House Summerhouse	Much Marcle	Summerhouse	Late 17th century	6 March 1967	SO6526531788; 51°59′00″N 2°30′26″W	1099011	Upload Photo
Church of St George	Orleton	Church	12th century	11 June 1959	SO4943467174; 52°18′01″N 2°44′35″W	1349873	Church of St George More images
Church of St Mary	Pembridge	Church	12th century and 13th century	16 October 1967	SO3909558052; 52°13′02″N 2°53′34″W	1081754	Church of St Mary More images
St Mary's Church Belfry	Pembridge	Bell tower	Early 13th-century origins	16 October 1967	SO3911058086; 52°13′03″N 2°53′34″W	1301249	St Mary's Church Belfry More images
Church of St Peter	Peterchurch	Church	Mid 12th century	26 January 1967	SO3449638520; 52°02′28″N 2°57′23″W	1296560	Church of St Peter More images
Wellbrook Manor	Peterchurch	House	2nd half 14th century	29 September 1952	SO3508638469; 52°02′27″N 2°56′52″W	1099488	Wellbrook Manor More images
Church of St Giles	Aston, Pipe Aston	Church	12th century	11 June 1959	SO4612471793; 52°20′30″N 2°47′32″W	1349901	Church of St Giles More images
Church of St Bartholomew	Richards Castle	Church	12th century	11 June 1959	SO4843370280; 52°19′41″N 2°45′29″W	1167572	Church of St Bartholomew More images
Court House Dovecote	Richards Castle	Dovecote	17th century	11 June 1959	SO4912669840; 52°19′27″N 2°44′52″W	1167549	Court House Dovecote More images
Tower about 10 metres East of Church of St Bartholomew	Richards Castle	Bell tower	14th century	11 December 1987	SO4846170277; 52°19′41″N 2°45′28″W	1081780	Tower about 10 metres East of Church of St Bartholomew
Rudhall House	Rudhall, Ross-on-Wye	House	14th century	25 February 1966	SO6255225388; 51°55′33″N 2°32′46″W	1099260	Upload Photo
Church of St Mary the Virgin	Ross-on-Wye	Church	17th century	22 October 1952	SO5979824046; 51°54′49″N 2°35′09″W	1098720	Church of St Mary the Virgin More images
Wilton Bridge (that Part in Ross on Wye Urban District)	Ross-on-Wye	Bridge	1597-1599	22 October 1952	SO5899724214; 51°54′54″N 2°35′51″W	1349266	Wilton Bridge (that Part in Ross on Wye Urban District) More images
Church of St Peter	Rowlstone	Church	12th century	26 January 1967	SO3737827131; 51°56′21″N 2°54′44″W	1078157	Church of St Peter More images
Church of St Mary	Sarnesfield	Church	c. 1870	2 September 1966	SO3747250925; 52°09′11″N 2°54′55″W	1349517	Church of St Mary More images
Church of St Tysilio	Sellack	Church	1711	26 March 1987	SO5653527659; 51°56′45″N 2°38′02″W	1214929	Church of St Tysilio More images
Church of St John the Evangelist	Shobdon Park, Shobdon	Church	14th century	11 June 1959	SO4011462847; 52°15′38″N 2°52′44″W	1166734	Church of St John the Evangelist More images
Church of St Margaret	St Margarets	Church	12th century	26 January 1967	SO3537933777; 51°59′55″N 2°56′34″W	1266723	Church of St Margaret More images
Church of St Weonard	St Weonards	Church	13th century	30 April 1986	SO4961024333; 51°54′55″N 2°44′02″W	1179982	Church of St Weonard More images
Treago	St. Weonards, Herefordshire	House	Late 15th century or early 16th century	30 April 1986	SO4902123910; 51°54′41″N 2°44′33″W	1099712	Treago More images
Church of St Mary	Staunton on Wye	Church	C12, C13 and 14th century	2 September 1966	SO3755144833; 52°05′54″N 2°54′47″W	1166457	Church of St Mary More images
Church of St Mary	Stoke Edith	Church	17th century	26 January 1967	SO6040340656; 52°03′46″N 2°34′44″W	1099825	Church of St Mary More images
Church of St Lawrence	Stretton Grandison	Church	Early 12th century	6 March 1967	SO6328544073; 52°05′38″N 2°32′14″W	1157113	Church of St Lawrence More images
Church of St Bartholomew	Thruxton	Church	14th century	26 January 1962	SO4371434624; 52°00′26″N 2°49′17″W	1178827	Church of St Bartholomew More images
Churchyard Cross about 8 yards South of the Chancel of the Church of St Mary	Tyberton	Cross	14th century	21 February 1986	SO3803539881; 52°03′14″N 2°54′18″W	1179124	Churchyard Cross about 8 yards South of the Chancel of the Church of St Mary More images
Church of St John the Baptist	Upton Bishop	Church	12th century	25 February 1966	SO6502527210; 51°56′32″N 2°30′37″W	1166738	Church of St John the Baptist More images
Church of St Bartholomew	Vowchurch	Church	12th century	26 January 1967	SO3619036467; 52°01′23″N 2°55′53″W	1225063	Church of St Bartholomew More images
Church of St Michael	Walford	Church	12th century	17 March 1987	SO5862220424; 51°52′51″N 2°36′09″W	1167585	Church of St Michael More images
Hill Court Manor	Walford	House	1698-1700	18 May 1953	SO5750621652; 51°53′30″N 2°37′08″W	1099665	Hill Court Manor More images
Church of St Margaret	Wellington	Church	Late 12th century	15 July 1985	SO4971948201; 52°07′47″N 2°44′09″W	1099322	Church of St Margaret More images
Church of St Mary	Welsh Newton	Church	13th century	25 February 1966	SO4996118022; 51°51′31″N 2°43′41″W	1224918	Church of St Mary More images
Pembridge Castle	Welsh Newton	Castle	Late 12th century or early 13th century	25 February 1966	SO4881319274; 51°52′11″N 2°44′41″W	1224913	Pembridge Castle More images
Church of Saint Peter and Saint Paul	Weobley	Church	Mid 14th century	2 September 1966	SO4017751865; 52°09′42″N 2°52′33″W	1301343	Church of Saint Peter and Saint Paul More images
The Ley	Weobley	House	Late 16th century	20 February 1953	SO3926351194; 52°09′20″N 2°53′21″W	1349847	The Ley More images
Church of St Bartholomew	Westhide	Church	Late 12th century	26 January 1967	SO5862244191; 52°05′40″N 2°36′19″W	1301742	Church of St Bartholomew More images
Bollitree Castle Barn on West Side of Farmyard and Curtain Wall Enclosing Yard	Weston under Penyard	Barn	Mid 18th century	18 May 1953	SO6367724032; 51°54′49″N 2°31′46″W	1296781	Bollitree Castle Barn on West Side of Farmyard and Curtain Wall Enclosing Yard
Chapel Farmhouse	Deerfold, Wigmore	Farmhouse	Early 15th century	11 June 1959	SO3942868435; 52°18′38″N 2°53′24″W	1081779	Chapel Farmhouse More images
Church of St James	Wigmore	Church	Late 11th century	11 June 1959	SO4129269066; 52°19′00″N 2°51′46″W	1178822	Church of St James More images
Wigmore Castle ruins	Wigmore	Castle	MID 11th century ORIGINS	11 June 1959	SO4083969220; 52°19′04″N 2°52′10″W	1178673	Wigmore Castle ruins More images

== See also ==
- Category:Grade I listed buildings in Herefordshire
- Grade II* listed buildings in Herefordshire
