= St Mary's Church, Foy =

Church of St Mary, Foy
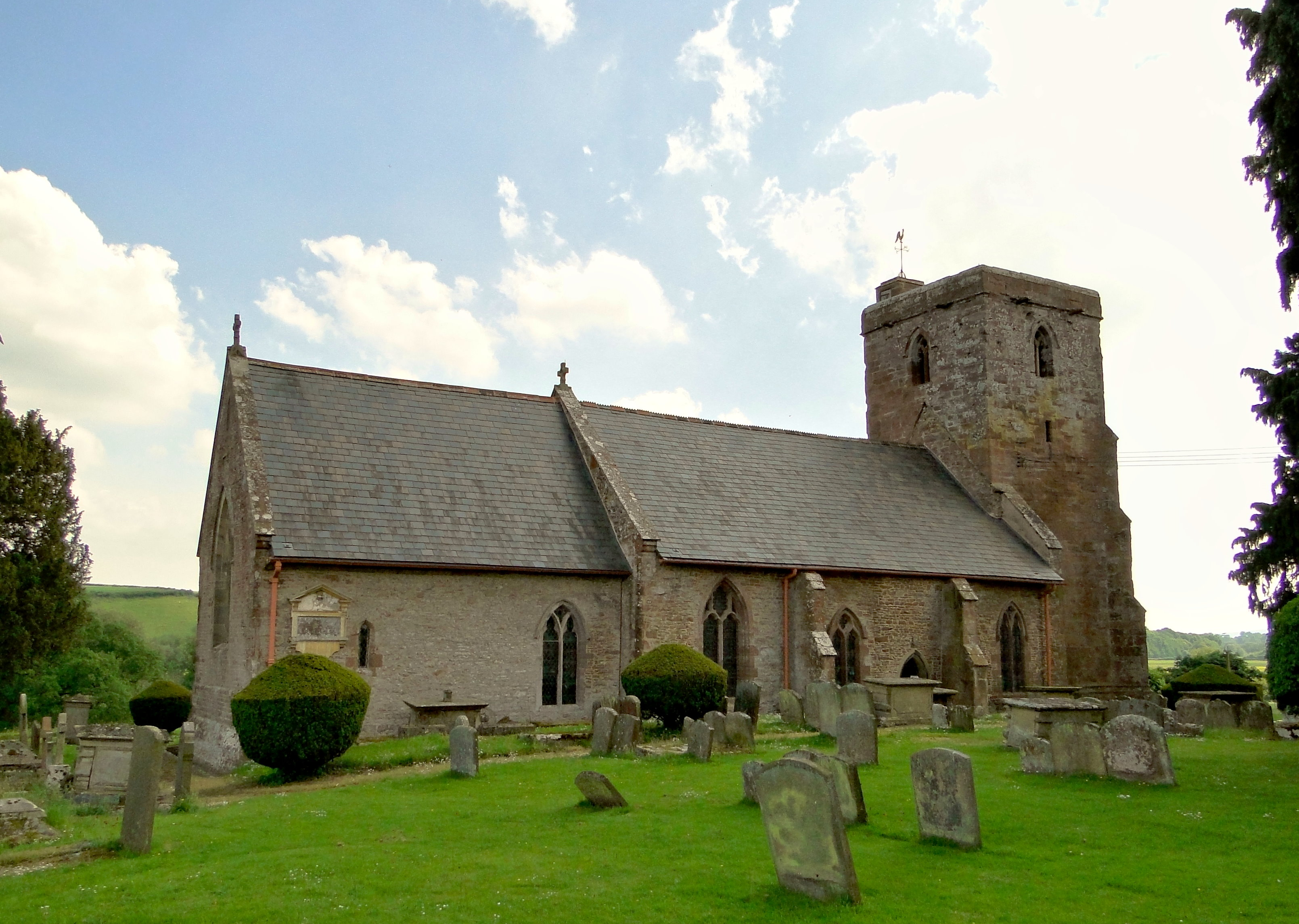
- Viewed from the north
- Church of St Mary, Foy
- 51°57′07.92″N 2°35′11.26″W
- OS grid reference: SO 59792 28348
- Location: Foy, Herefordshire
- Country: England
- Denomination: Church of England
- Website: www.stmarysfoy.co.uk

Administration
- Diocese: Diocese of Hereford

Listed Building – Grade I
- Official name: Church of St Mary
- Designated: 25 February 1966
- Reference no.: 1157820

St Mary's Church is a Grade I listed Anglican church in the hamlet of Foy, Herefordshire, England. It is in the Diocese of Hereford, and in the Benefice of StowCaple. The building dates from the 13th century and was modified in the 14th century. There was restoration in 1854 and 1863.

== History and description ==
The church is situated on a small cliff of Old Red Sandstone, on a peninsula formed by a bend of the River Wye. From the churchyard, there is a view looking south-east across the River Wye.

It is thought there was an earlier church building, dedicated to a Celtic saint. After the Norman conquest, the dedication was changed to Saint Faith (French: Sainte Foy) and later to Saint Mary.

=== 13th and 14th centuries ===
Because of the terrain, the church is aligned north-east to south-west. The building is of sandstone rubble with ashlar dressing, and the roof is of Welsh slate. The nave and chancel of the present church, including the chancel arch, were built in the 13th century. In the 14th century, the tower was built, the south wall of the nave was modified, the south porch was added and some of the windows were replaced.

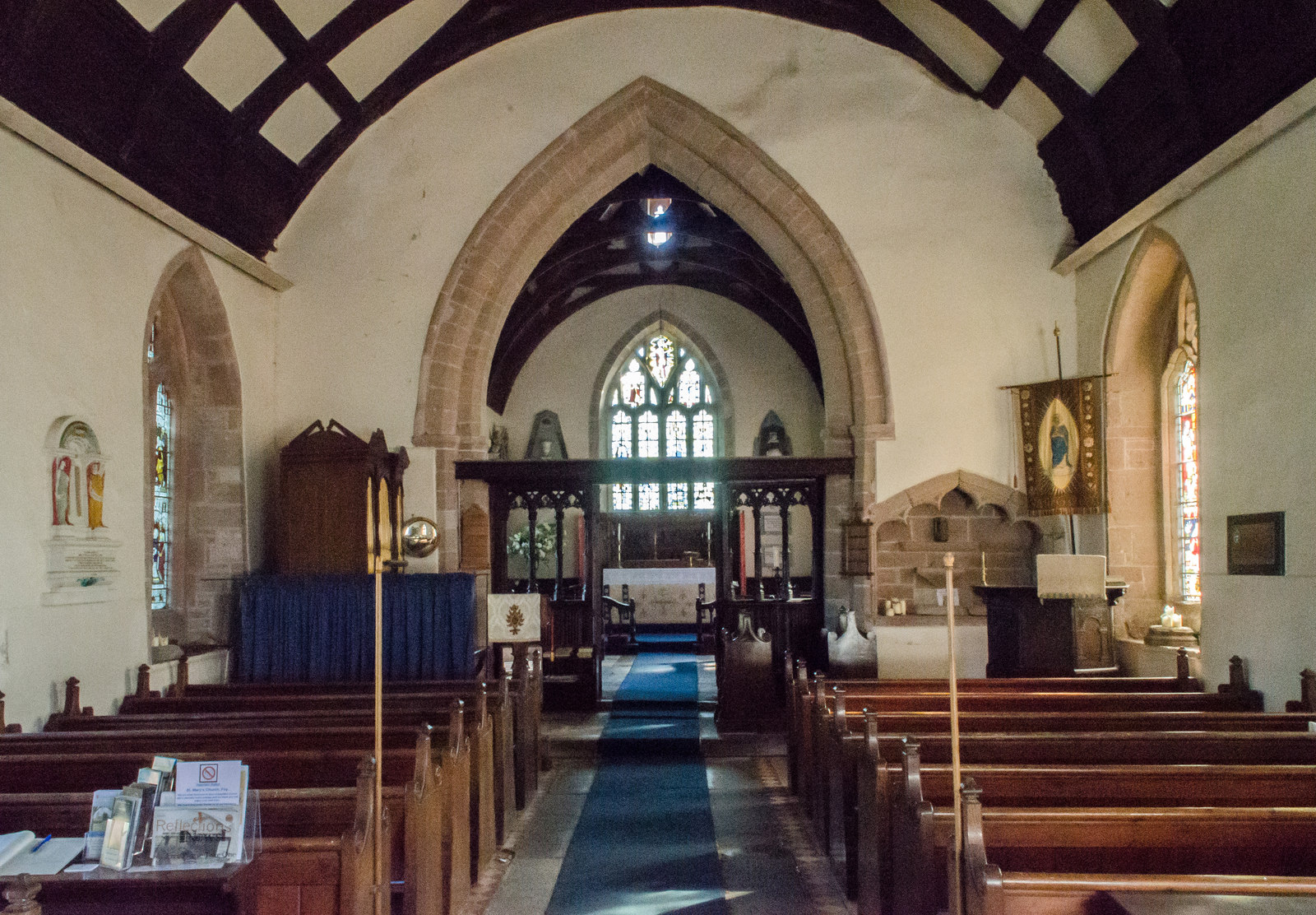
Interior, looking towards the chancel

It is thought that stone for the 14th-century modifications came from Eaton Tregoz Castle, about half a mile east of the church. Robert de Tregoz, lord of the manor in the 13th century, died with Simon de Montfort at the Battle of Evesham in 1265, and the castle was later demolished. The village of Eaton Tregoz was deserted perhaps in the 14th century.

Inside the church there is a large decagonal font that dates from the 14th century. It has pairs of trefoil-headed arches in the side panels, and a moulded base. Behind the pulpit, to the right of the chancel arch, is an altar tomb, probably of Sir Hugh Waterton (died 1409).

=== Abrahall family ===
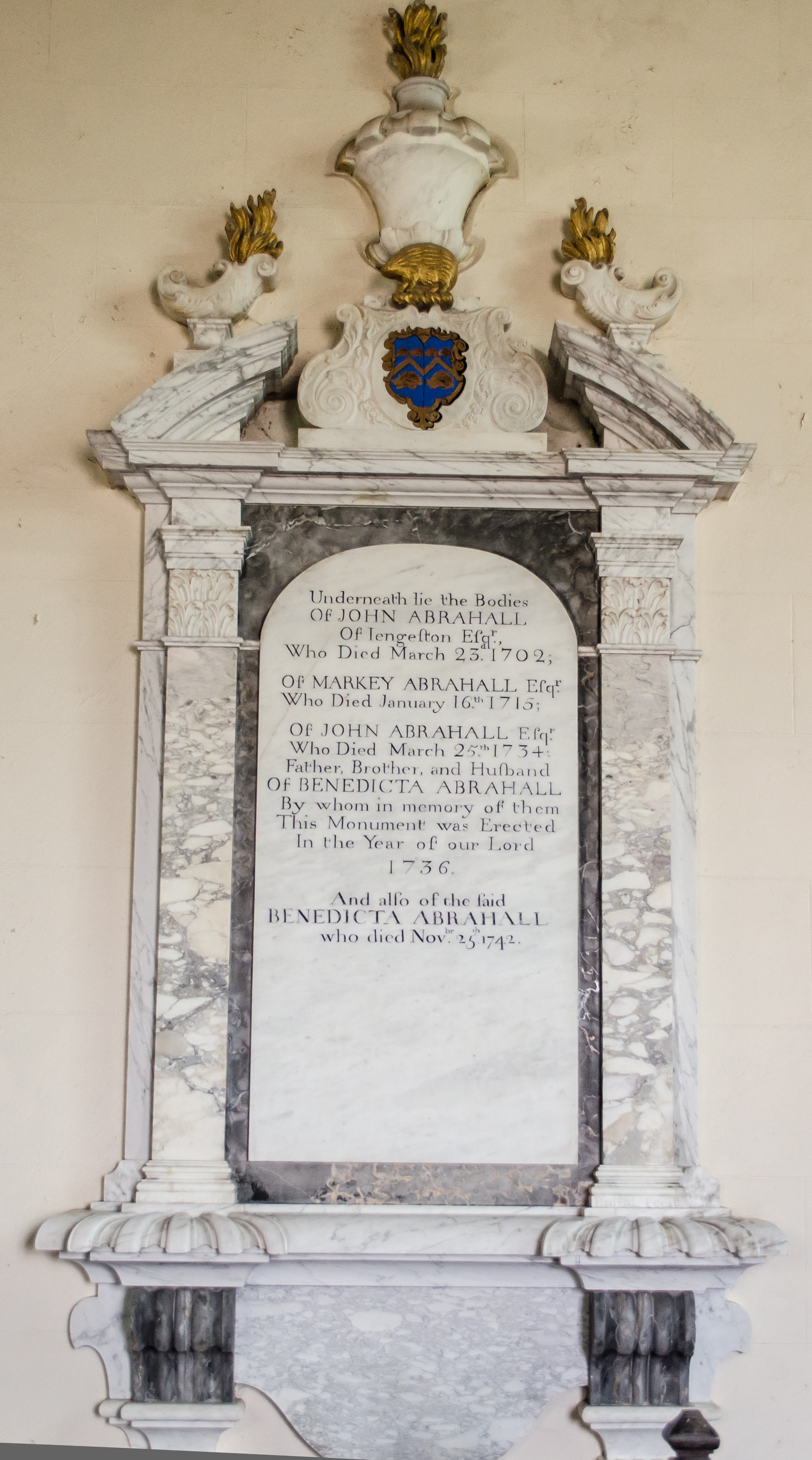
Memorial erected in 1735 in the north wall of the chancel

The Abrahall family were lords of the manor from the early 15th century, and nine members of the family held the benefice of the church, with two interruptions, from 1642 until 1937. They were benefactors of the church: they added in the 17th century the choir stalls, the pulpit (six-sided with decorative arcading in the panels), the finely carved timber rood screen, and rebuilt in 1673 the east wall of the chancel. The stained glass in the east window, which is a copy of the late 14th-century east window in St Tysilio's Church, Sellack, was installed in 1673 in memory of the 17th-century benefactor John Abrahall.

In the north wall of the chancel is a marble monument, by Esau Osborne of Bristol, erected in 1735 to John Abrahall (died 1734) and other members of the Abrahall family who died in the 18th century. Above the inscription, supported by Corinthian pilasters, is an open pediment where there is a funerary urn and the Abrahall coat of arms. There are other memorials inside the church to members of the Abrahall family.

=== Bells ===
There are six bells, by William Evans of Chepstow, five of them cast in 1738 and the tenor cast in 1765. The treble was recast in 1882. There is also a 17th-century sanctus, by John Finch of Hereford.

== See also ==
- Grade I listed buildings in Herefordshire
