= Ledbury Market Hall =

Municipal building in Ledbury, Herefordshire, England

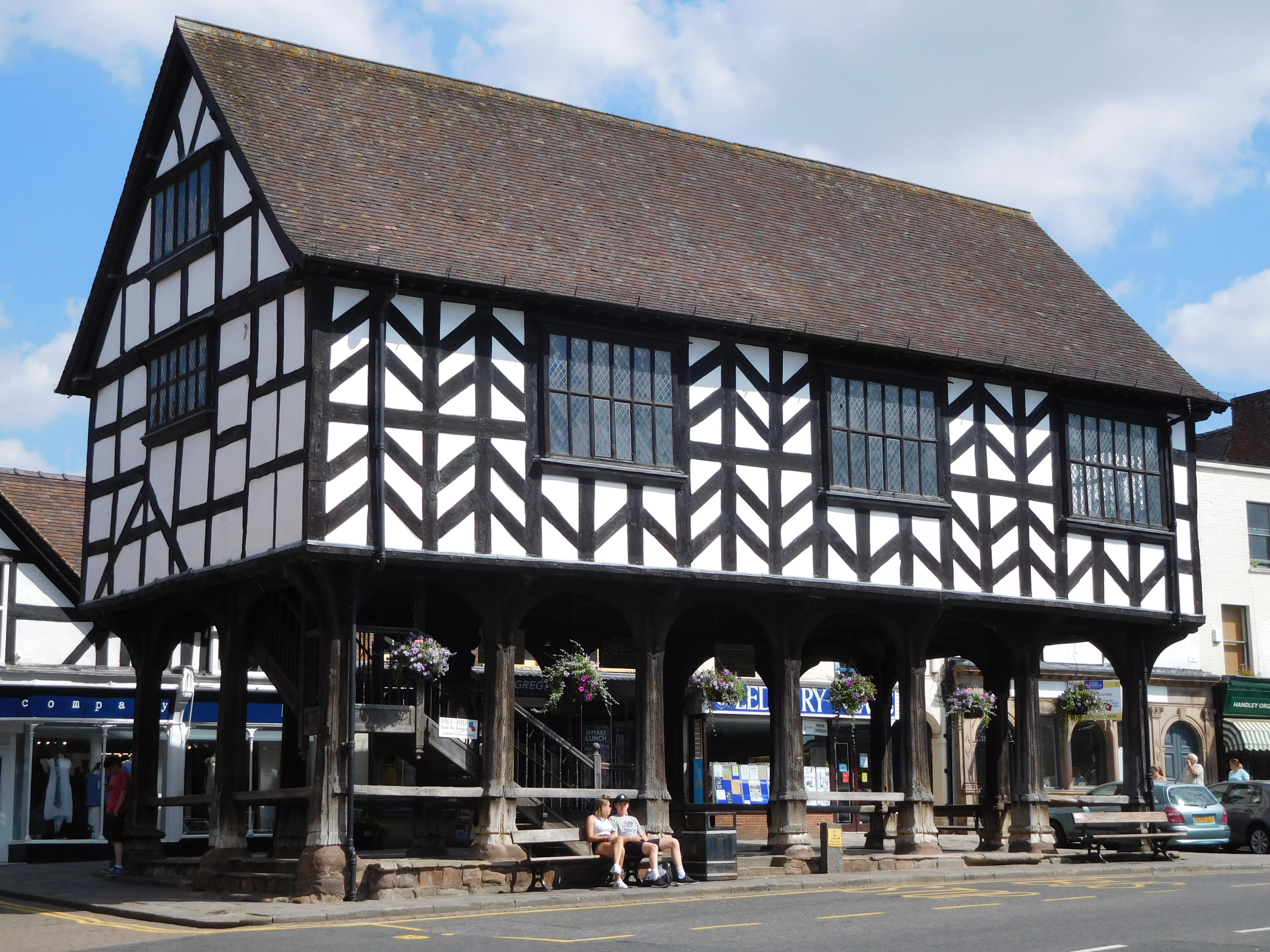
- Ledbury Market Hall

- Shown in Herefordshire
- 52.0370°N 2.4227°W
- Location: High Street, Ledbury

History
- Built: 1617

Site notes
- Architect: John Abel
- Architectural style: Tudor style

Listed Building – Grade I
- Official name: Market House, High Street
- Designated: 18 September 1953
- Reference no.: 1349392

Ledbury Market Hall, also known as Ledbury Town Hall, is a municipal building in the High Street in Ledbury, Herefordshire, England. The structure, which is used as an events venue, is a Grade I listed building.

== History ==
In the early 17th century, a market trader, John Phillips, launched an initiative to demolish an existing row of buildings in Shoppe Row and erect a market hall in their place. The building, which has been attributed to the master mason, John Abel, was designed in the Tudor style using half-timbered construction and was completed in 1617. The design involved a symmetrical main frontage with seven bays facing onto the High Street; the building was open on the ground floor, so that markets could be held, with a storeroom for grain on the first floor. The first floor, which was jettied out over the pavement, was supported by 16 oak posts and was accessed by a wooden staircase at the north end of the building. The first floor was fenestrated, on the west side, by three six-light mullioned and transomed windows and the half-timbering was executed in a Herringbone pattern.

The Royalists defeated the Roundheads in a minor skirmish in the Market Place in April 1645 during the English Civil War. The store room on the first floor was converted for civic use in the early 19th century, enabling it to be used as a town hall and also as a venue for theatrical performances: early performers included the actor, Ira Aldridge, who appeared in a series of melodramas in late January and early February 1831.

Queen Elizabeth II, accompanied by the Duke of Edinburgh, visited the building during a tour of the county in April 1957. The building continued to be used for meetings of Ledbury Town Council and wedding ceremonies until 2004 when these uses were discontinued because of the lack of access for the disabled. An extensive programme of restoration works, which involved temporarily raising the building by 600 millimetres (24 in) so that the oak posts could be restored, was completed in 2006.

== See also ==
- Grade I listed buildings in Herefordshire
