= Grade II* listed buildings in Herefordshire =

Herefordshire shown within England

There are over 20,000 Grade II* listed buildings in England. As the county of Herefordshire contains 356 of these sites they have been split into alphabetical order.

- Grade II* listed buildings in Herefordshire (A–L)
- Grade II* listed buildings in Herefordshire (M–Z)

== See also ==
- Grade I listed buildings in Herefordshire
