= Church of the Holy Trinity, Bosbury =

Coordinates: 52.0886°N 2.4458°W

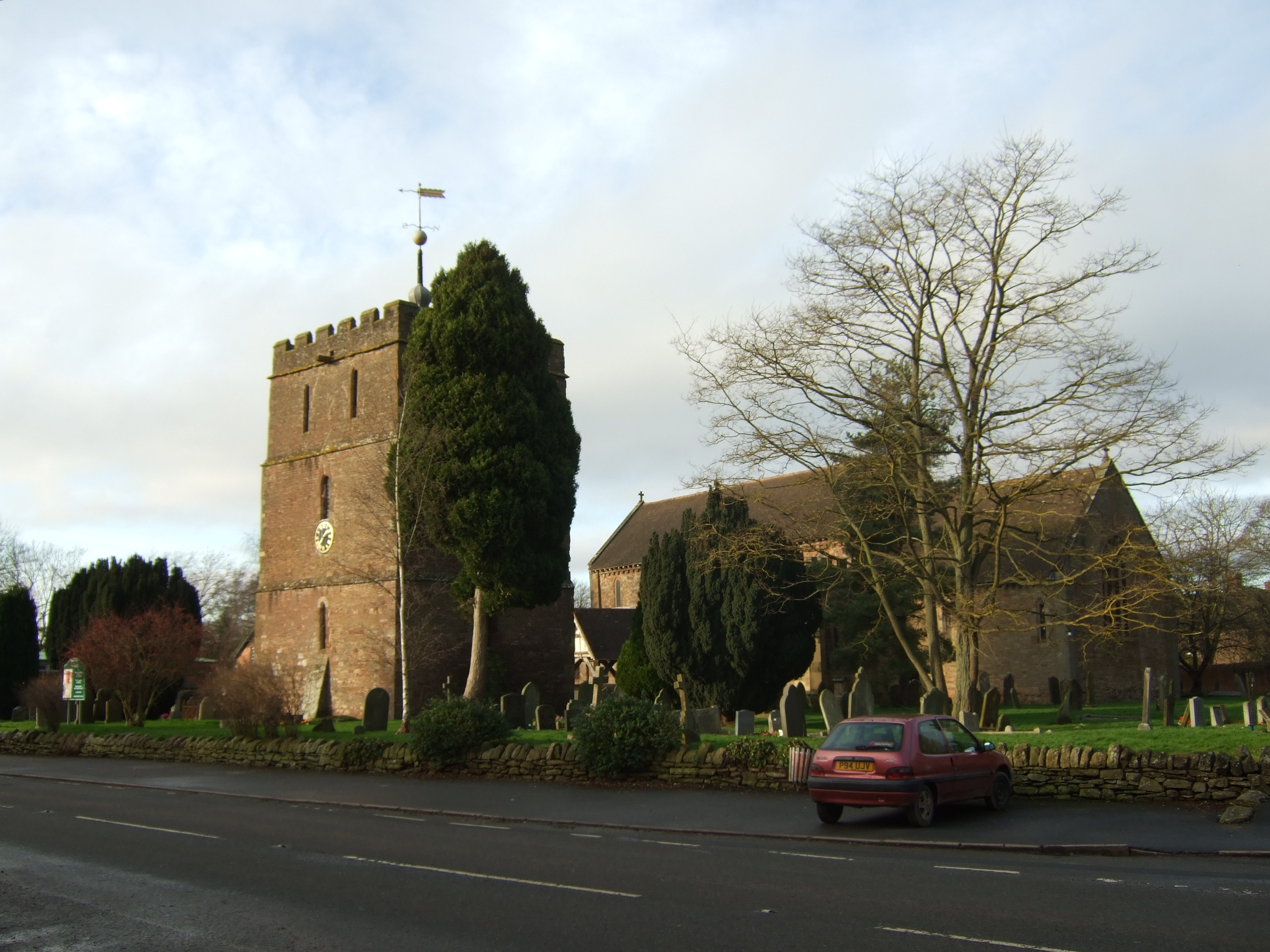

- Location in Hereford
- Location: Bosbury, Herefordshire
- Country: England
- Denomination: Anglican

History
- Status: Parish church

Architecture
- Functional status: Active
- Heritage designation: Grade I
- Designated: 6 March 1972
- Architectural type: Church

Administration
- Diocese: Diocese of Hereford
- Archdeaconry: Hereford
- Deanery: Ledbury
- Parish: Bosbury

Clergy
- Rector: Amanda Williams

The Church of the Holy Trinity is a Church of England parish church in Bosbury in the English county of Herefordshire. Its bell tower stands well apart from the church. Both are Grade I listed buildings.

== History ==
The lordship of the manor of Bosbury was held by the Bishops of Hereford from the Early Middle Ages. The bishops constructed an episcopal palace, the remnants of which now form Old Court Farmhouse, to the north of the church. The present church dates from the early 13th century, and incorporates elements of an earlier structure. The Victoria County History for Herefordshire suggests that the disused baptismal font is Anglo-Saxon in date. In the 15th century the palace ceased to be used by the bishops, and was leased to Thomas Morton, archdeacon of Hereford, and a relative of Cardinal John Morton who served as Archbishop of Canterbury. (Note: Thomas Morton, and his brother Rowland are variously described as brothers to Cardinal John Morton or as nephews.) Morton built the Morton Chapel attached to the side of the church. The condition of the church declined in the 17th and 18th centuries and it was restored in the 19th.

The church remains an active parish church in the Diocese of Hereford. Regular services are held.

=== Bell tower ===
The bell tower also dates from the 13th century but is wholly detached from the church. Such separation, and the fortified nature of the tower, were fairly common features in churches along the Welsh Marches as they provided a greater measure of defence. (Note: The interpretation of detached bell towers as defensive in purpose has been challenged. In a study of the detached belfry at St Mary's Church, Pembridge, published in the journal Vernacular Architecture in 2011, Andrew Boucher and Richard Morris discuss the likely rationale for detached church towers, a type relatively common in Herefordshire, and suggest that the traditional explanation, of the detached tower as a defensive structure, is implausible, given that many, including Pembridge, were originally constructed with openings at the ground floor level.)

== Architecture ==
Both church and tower are constructed of sandstone rubble. The church has an arcaded nave and windows with Perpendicular Gothic tracery. The rood screen may date from the 11th century, although it has been heavily restored. The later Morton Chapel has been considered an unsympathetic addition; the church website concludes; "it concedes nothing to the simple Transitional church with which it can only be said to have collided".

The tower is strongly fortified; it rises 48 feet high with walls 6 feet thick.

== Gallery ==
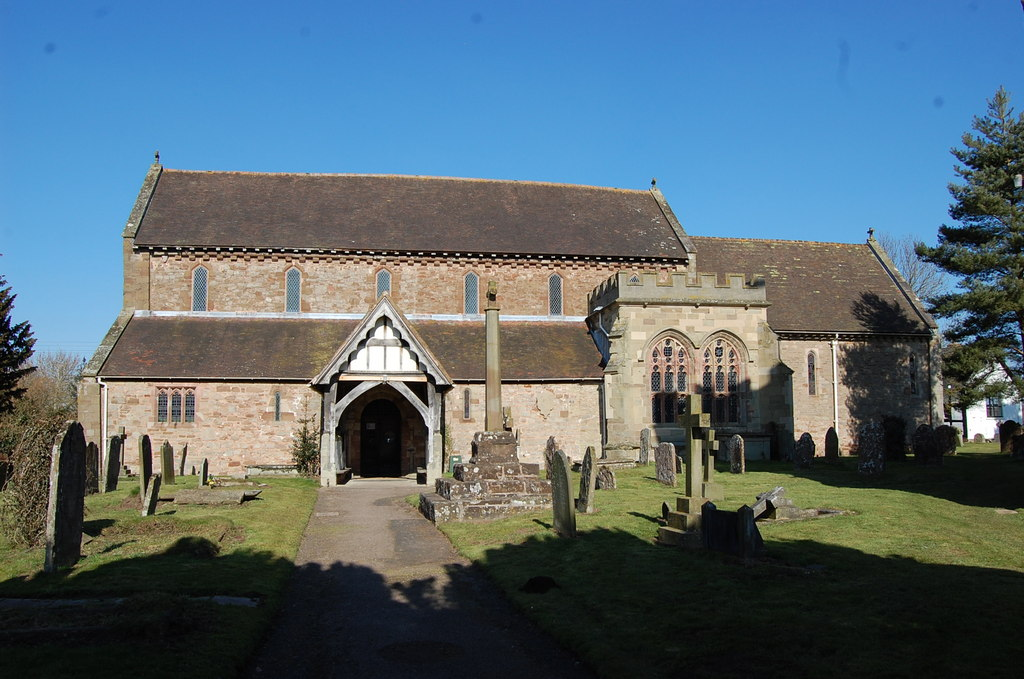
The church with the Morton Chapel to the centre-right

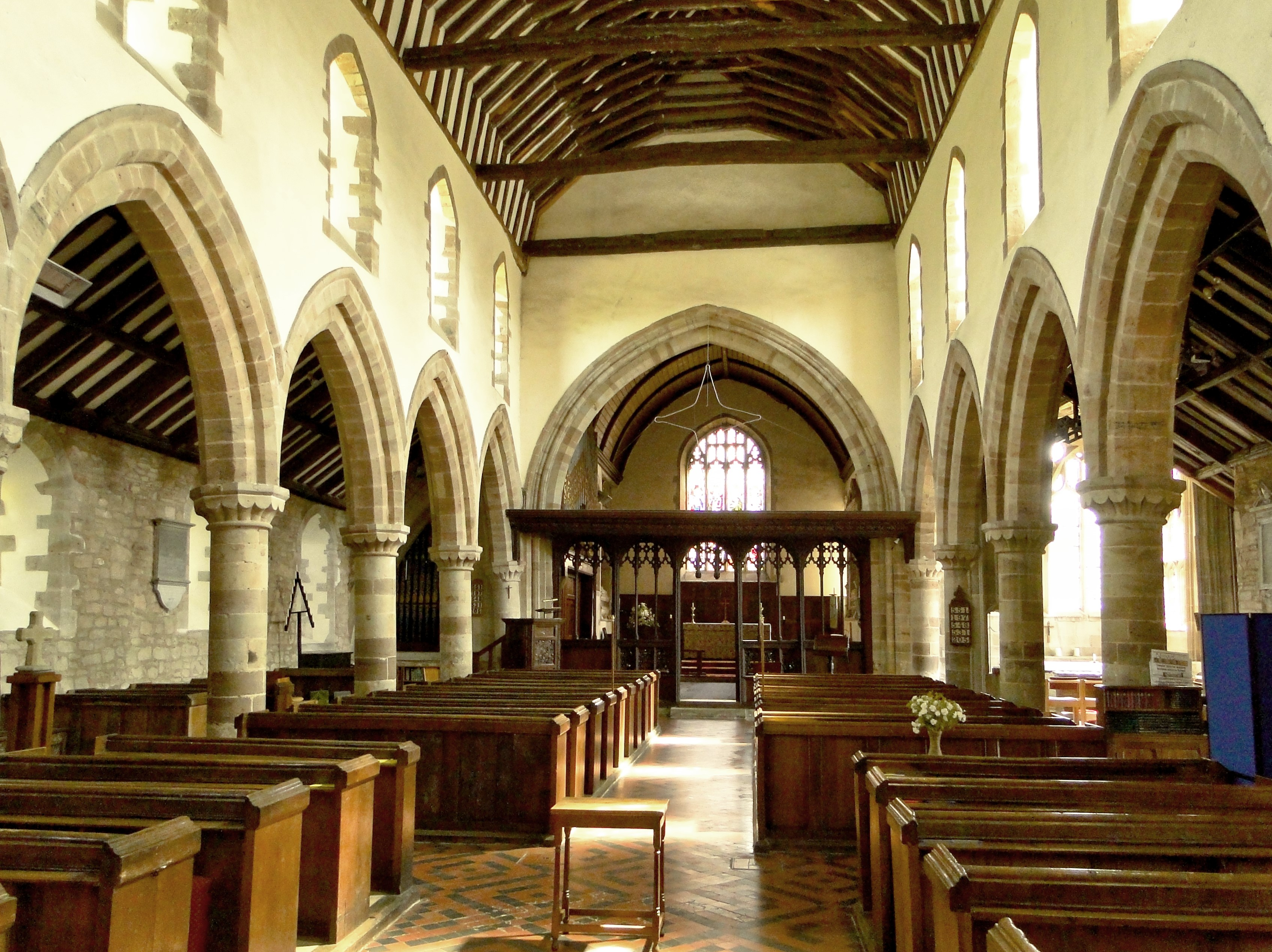
Nave

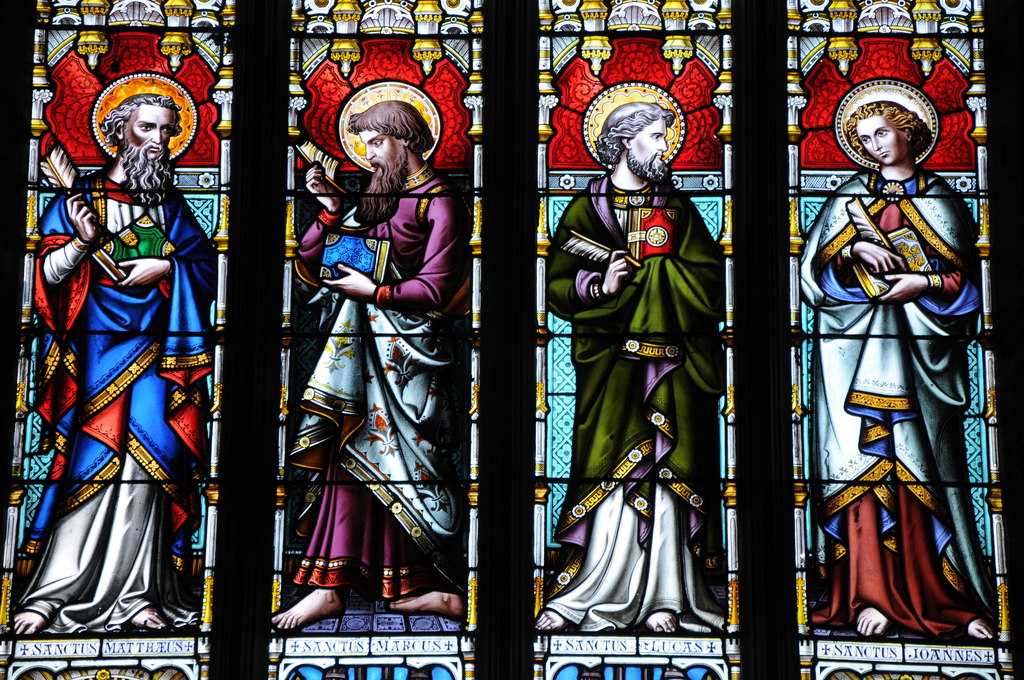
Stained glass

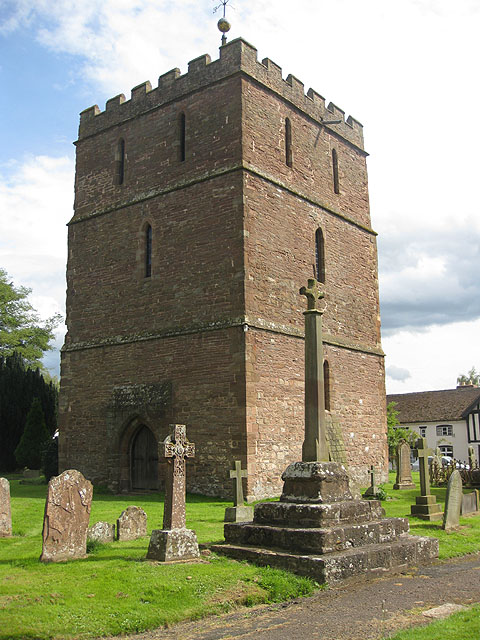
Bell tower and churchyard cross

== Sources ==
- Boucher, Andrew R; Morriss, Richard K. (2011). "The Bell Tower of St Mary's Church, Pembridge, Herefordshire". Vernacular Architecture. 42. Taylor & Francis: 22–35. doi:10.1179/174962911X13159065475428.
- Brooks, Alan; Pevsner, Nikolaus (2012). Herefordshire. The Buildings of England. New Haven, US and London: Yale University Press. ISBN 978-0-300-12575-7. OCLC 759174126.
