= St Andrew's Church, Hampton Bishop =

Church of St Andrew, Hampton Bishop
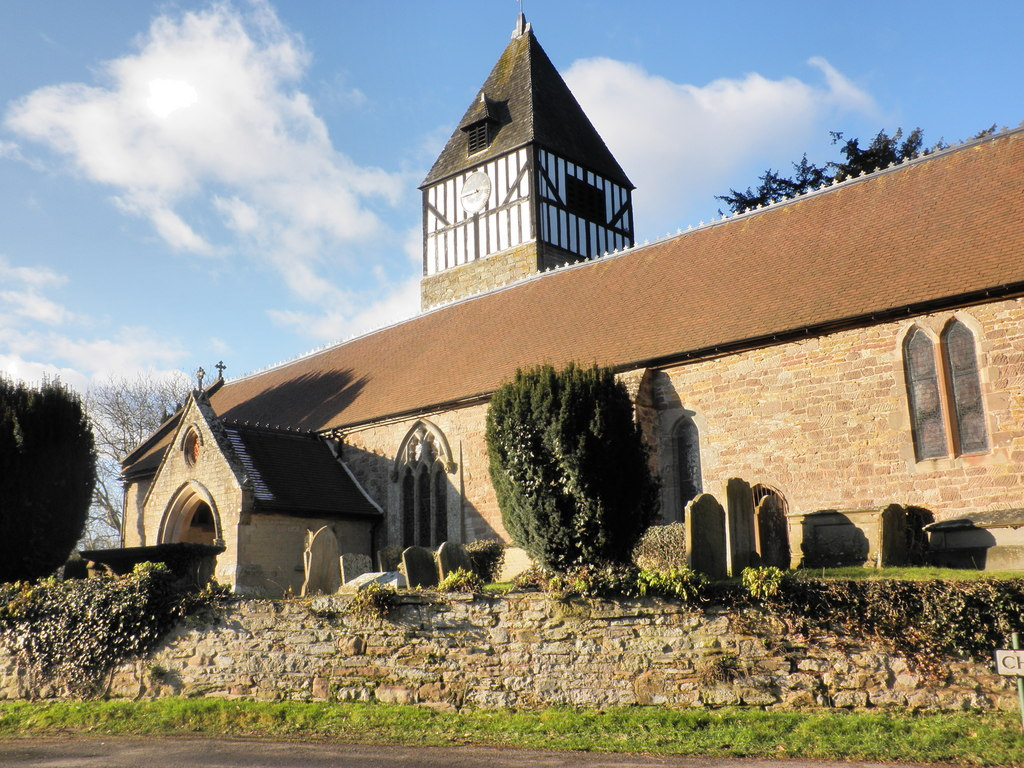
- Church of St Andrew, Hampton Bishop
- 52°02′19.32″N 2°38′40.38″W
- OS grid reference: SO 55886 38011
- Location: Hampton Bishop, Herefordshire
- Country: England
- Denomination: Church of England

Administration
- Diocese: Diocese of Hereford

Listed Building – Grade I
- Official name: Church of St Andrew
- Designated: 26 January 1967
- Reference no.: 1301948

St Andrew's Church is an Anglican church in the village of Hampton Bishop, in Herefordshire, England. It is in the Diocese of Hereford, and in the Benefice of Tupsley with Hampton Bishop. The building dates from the 12th century, and has been modified in later centuries. It is Grade I listed.

== History and description ==
The building is of local red sandstone. It dates from the 12th century, with additions and alterations in the 13th and 14th centuries. There was restoration in the early 19th century and early 20th century.

There is a nave and chancel, a north-east aisle and north chapel. Externally, there is no distinction between the nave and chancel. Inside, they are separated by a 12th-century chancel arch. The tower, north of the nave, dates from the 12th century; its upper stage, timber-framed and with a shingled pyramid roof, was built more recently.

=== Later modifications ===
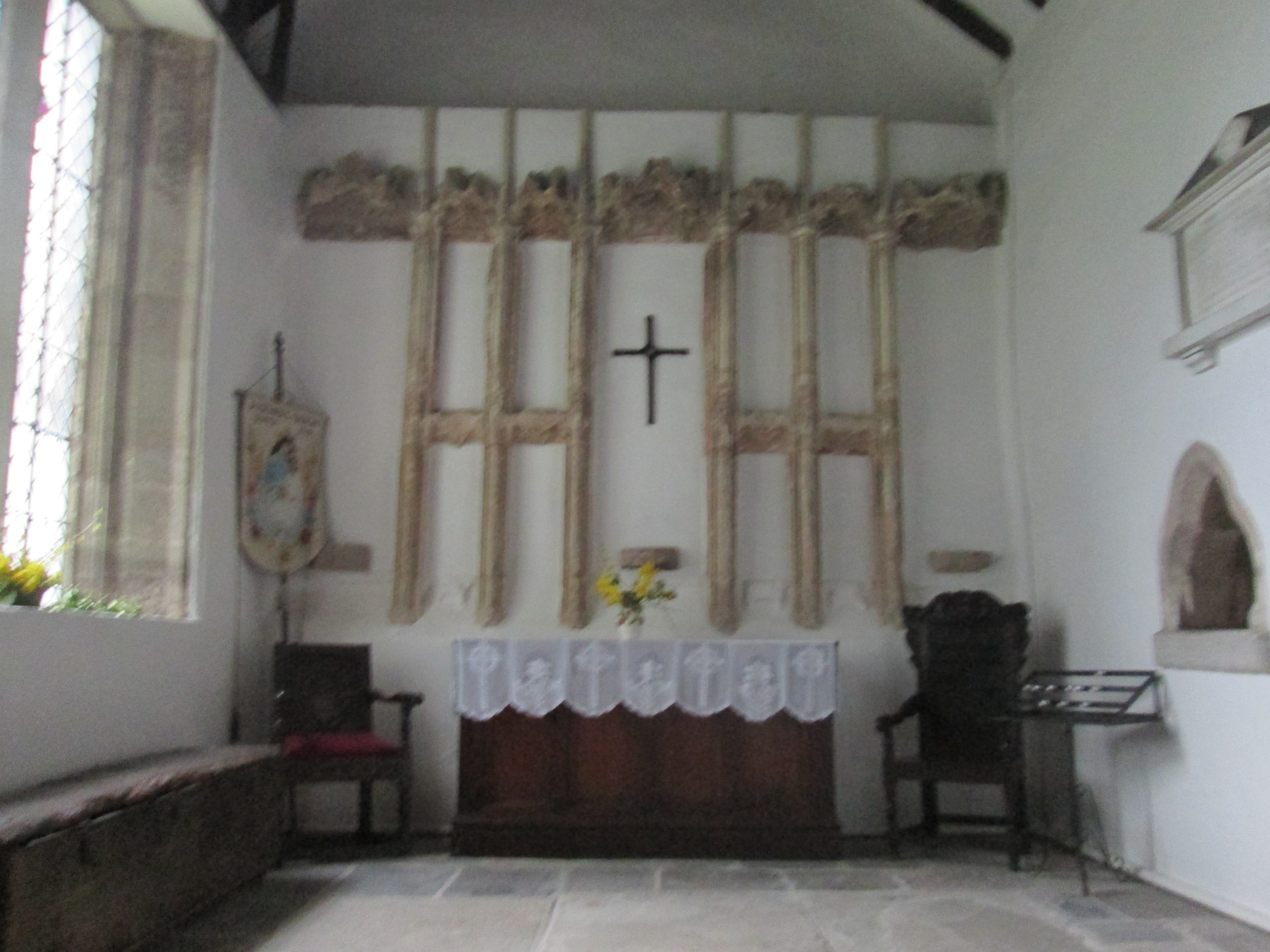
The north chapel, with stone reredos

During the 13th and 14th centuries, the chancel was extended eastwards, and there is a double piscina dating from this time. A 12th-century arch leads from the chancel to the north chapel, which was modified from the 14th century: the reredos in the chapel, dating from the 15th century, is of sandstone and has a baldacchino canopy.

There is a trussed rafter roof throughout; in the nave, north aisle and north chapel it is thought to date from the 14th century, and in the chancel from the 15th or 16th century.

The font is 13th-century. It has a plain circular bowl, and a circular stem.

The windows of the nave and chancel date from the 13th to 16th centuries. Stained glass in the windows is from the 19th century; the window just east of the main door is by T. W. Camm.

There are six bells, five of which were cast in the 17th century.

=== The organ, and the link with Sir Edward Elgar ===
The north-east aisle is occupied by the organ, built by Nicholson & Lord of Walsall. When Sir Edward Elgar lived nearby on the outskirts of Hereford, he regularly visited the church and played on the organ. It is thought he may have worked on some of his compositions here.

=== Churchyard cross ===
In the churchyard is a 14th-century sandstone cross: an octagonal shaft, on a square base, stands on an octagonal stepped plinth. The cross fitted to the shaft dates from the 19th century.

== See also ==
- Grade I listed buildings in Herefordshire
