= Church of St Tysilio, Sellack =

St Tysilio's Church, Sellack
- Viewed from the north
- St Tysilio's Church, Sellack
- 51°56′44.52″N 2°38′01.54″W
- OS grid reference: SO 56535 27659
- Location: Sellack, Herefordshire
- Country: England
- Denomination: Church of England

History
- Dedication: Saint Tysilio

Administration
- Diocese: Diocese of Hereford

Listed Building – Grade I
- Official name: Church of St Tysilio
- Designated: 26 March 1987
- Reference no.: 1214929

The Church of St Tysilio is an Anglican church in the village of Sellack, in Herefordshire, England. It is in the Diocese of Hereford. The earliest parts of the building date from the early 12th century, and it was modified in the 14th century. It is Grade I listed.

== History and description ==
The church is dedicated to Tysilio, a 7th-century Celtic saint. The present church, built of local sandstone rubble and ashlar, probably replaced an earlier wooden building. There is a nave and chancel, a north aisle, north transept, north chapel and adjoining vestry, and a west tower with an octagonal stone spire.

Nave and chancel, seen from the gallery

The oldest parts, dating from the early 12th century, are the chancel and nave, which are undivided, and the north aisle. The north chapel, built in the eathy 13th century, was rebuilt in the 14th century and has a stone vault; the north aisle was also rebuilt in the 14th century, and the west tower and south porch were added. In the early 19th century, the north transept was built, replacing most of the norh aisle, and the vestry in the north-east corner was added.

A gallery was erected at the west end of the nave in the 17th century, and the organ in the gallery was installed in the 1890s. The pulpit is also 17th-century; it is hexagonal and has a sounding-board.

The east window, dating from the late 14th century, was later copied in the east window of St Mary's Church, Foy.

There are several 17th- and 18th-century memorials in the church.

=== Churchyard ===
There is a churchyard cross about 5 yards south-east of the south porch. The octagonal shaft and cross are thought to be of the late 19th or early 20th century. The base of the cross, and the three octagonal steps, date from the 14th or 15th century. It is listed Grade II.

== See also ==
- Grade I listed buildings in Herefordshire
