= Bollitree Castle =

Country house in Weston under Penyard, Herefordshire, England

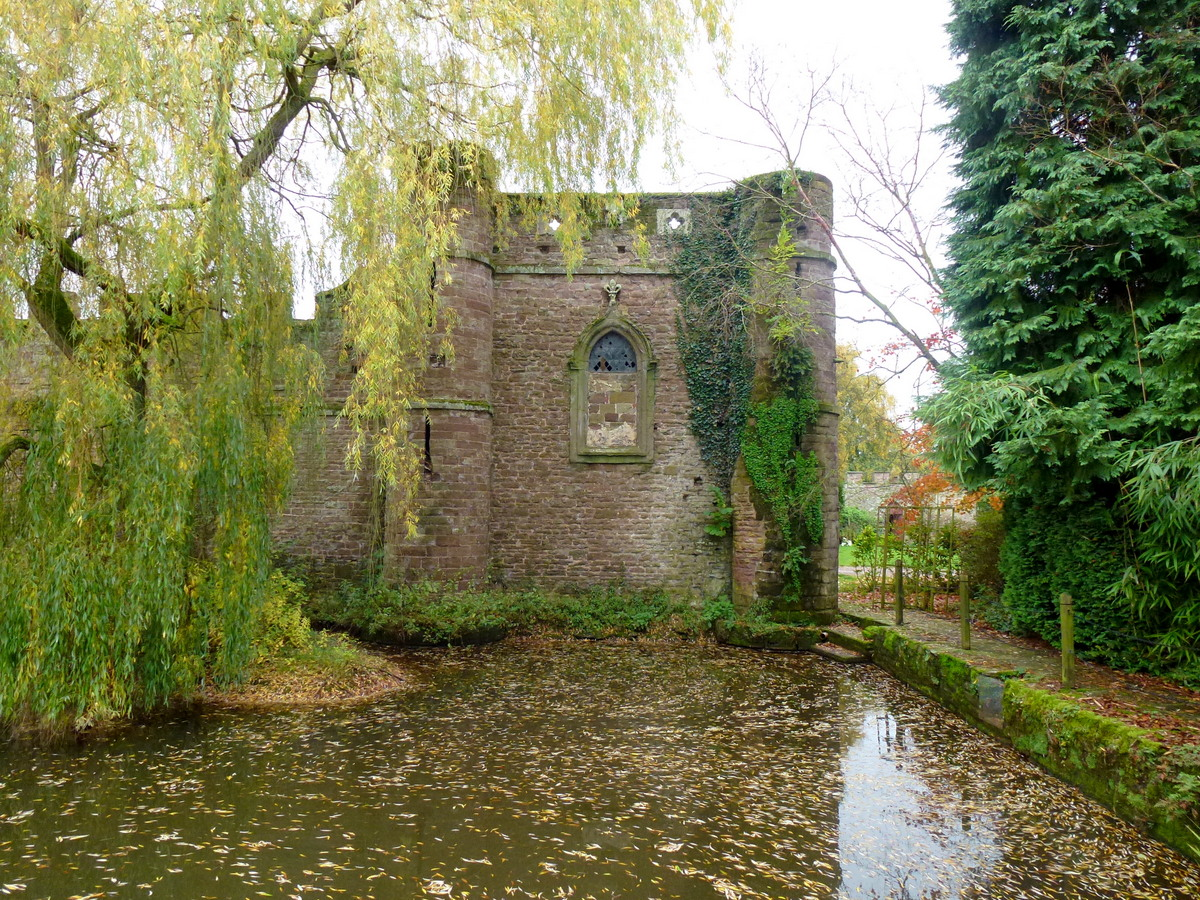
- A section of the mock castle walls which give Bollitree its name

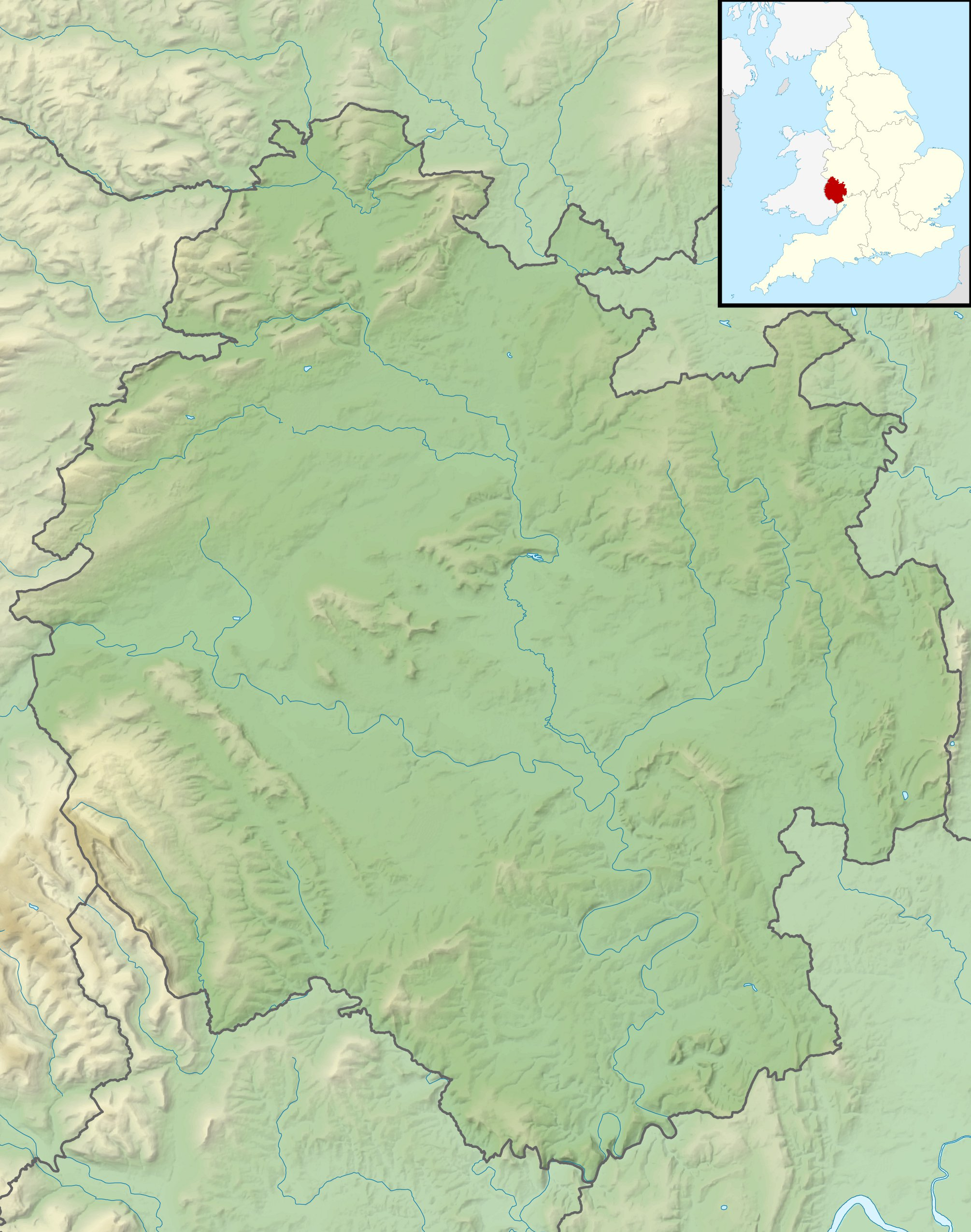
- Location within Herefordshire
- 51.9136°N 2.5295°W
- Type: Country house
- Location: Weston under Penyard, Herefordshire

History
- Built: 18th century with earlier origins

Site notes
- Architectural style: Mock castle
- Governing body: Privately owned
- Owner: Richard Hammond

Listed Building – Grade I
- Official name: Barn on west side of farmyard and curtain wall enclosing yard at Bollitree Castle
- Designated: 18 May 1953
- Reference no.: 1296781

Listed Building – Grade II*
- Official name: Bollitree Castle Farmhouse
- Designated: 18 May 1953
- Reference no.: 1099638

Listed Building – Grade II
- Official name: Building extending to west at south-west corner of farmyard at Bollitree Castle
- Designated: 17 March 1987
- Reference no.: 1099639

Listed Building – Grade II
- Official name: Barn on south side of farmyard at Bollitree Castle Farmhouse with arcaded farm building adjoining to south
- Designated: 18 May 1953
- Reference no.: 1167693

Listed Building – Grade II
- Official name: Dovecote 50 metres south of Bollitree Castle Farmhouse
- Designated: 17 March 1987
- Reference no.: 1099640

Bollitree Castle is a historic site on the edge of the village of Weston under Penyard, Herefordshire, England. The site consists of Bollitree Castle farmhouse, two barns, a dovecote, a gate, and a series of mock castellated curtain walls from which the site takes its name. Bollitree Castle Farmhouse is a Grade II* listed building, one of the barns, which contains genuine medieval fragments, is listed at the highest grade, Grade I, while the other structures have their own Grade II listings.

== History ==
There is architectural evidence of habitation at Bollitree Castle from medieval times. In the 15th century, the estate was owned by the Merryk family, (Note: There are many alternative spellings, including ap Meryk and Merrick) of whom the most notable member was Richard Amerike (c. 1440–1503), a Bristol-based merchant whose name has been suggested as the origin of America although this is disputed. The castle farmhouse dates from c.1700. Later in the 18th century, the major transformation of the farmhouse and the wider site was undertaken. Local tradition suggests this was carried out by a Thomas Merrick, in pursuit of a Spanish woman whom he wanted to marry and who had indicated that she wished to live in a castle, but there is little documentary evidence for this. Historic England records the sham castle fortifications, but posits no suggestion as to their builder's motivations.

Bollitree was owned by Richard Hammond, the television presenter, who bought the castle in 2012. (Note: Some sources mistakenly suggest that a previous owner of Bollitree Castle was the singer, Marc Bolan. Bolan in fact owned the Old Rectory, which stands to the south of Bollitree, on Rectory Lane.) In 2023, redevelopment plans submitted by Hammond were turned down by Herefordshire County Council following objections from the Georgian Group. After Hammond and his wife divorced, she retained possession of Bollitree, with Hammond moving firstly to rented accommodation, and subsequently to a house near Abergavenny, Wales.

== Architecture and description ==
The main barn at Bollitree, with the bulk of the castellated curtain walls, contains some genuine medieval fragments, and is listed at Grade I. The farmhouse, which forms the main residence on the site, is listed at Grade II*. Another ancillary agricultural building, a further barn, a dovecote, and a gate in a garden wall are listed at Grade II.

== Gallery ==
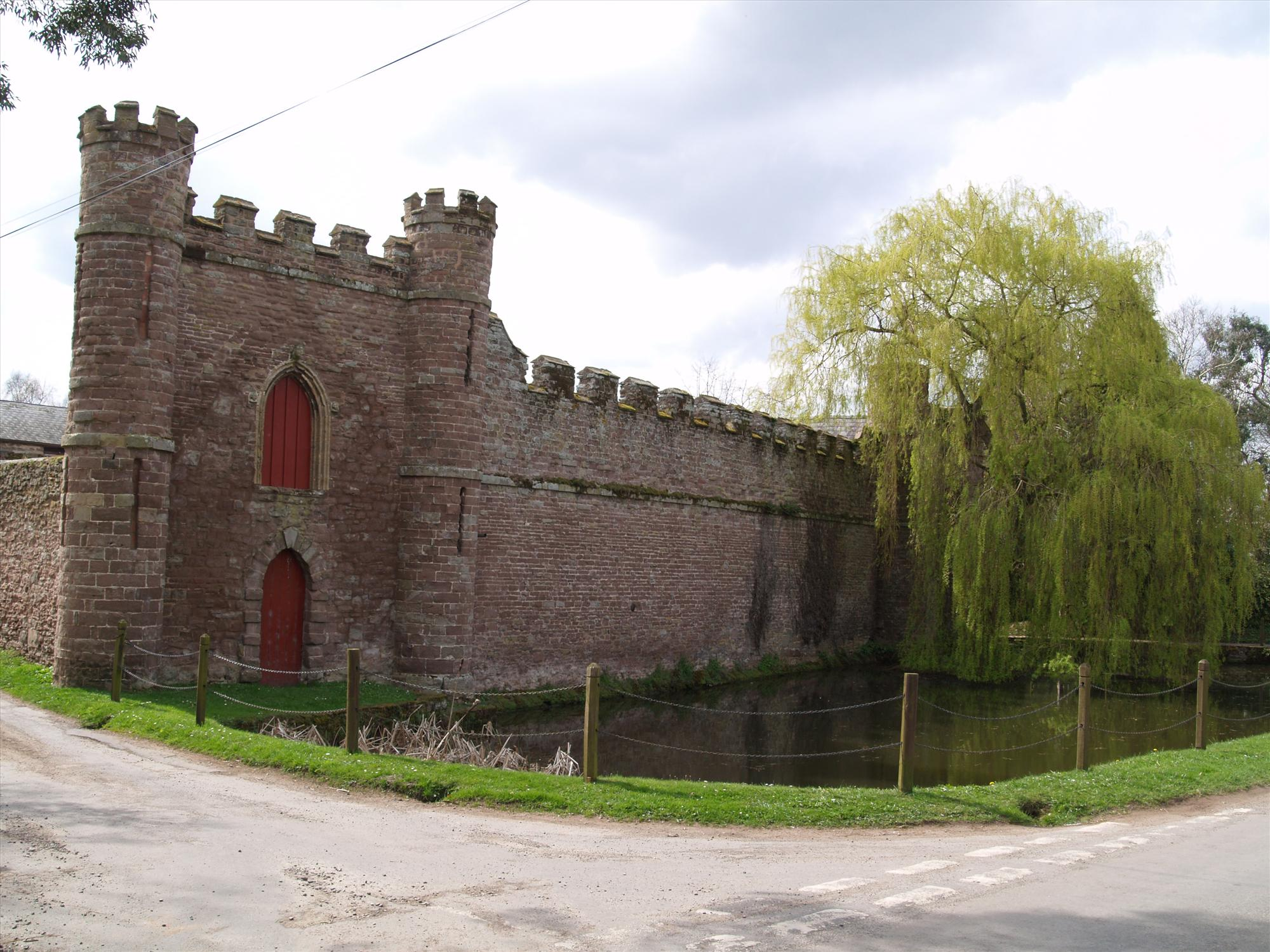
Mock castellated curtain walls and a fake moat

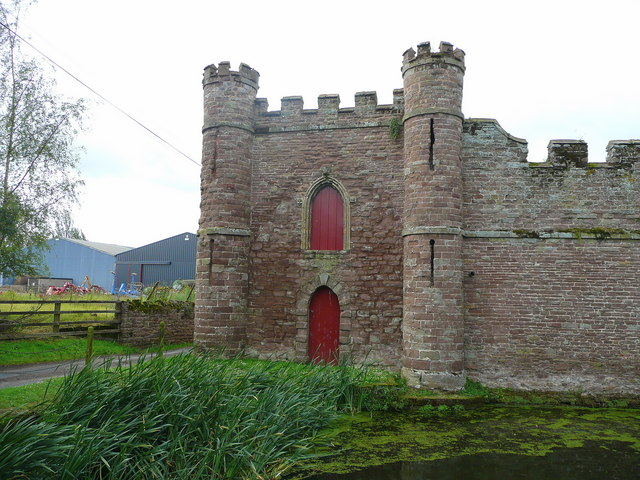
Corner tower

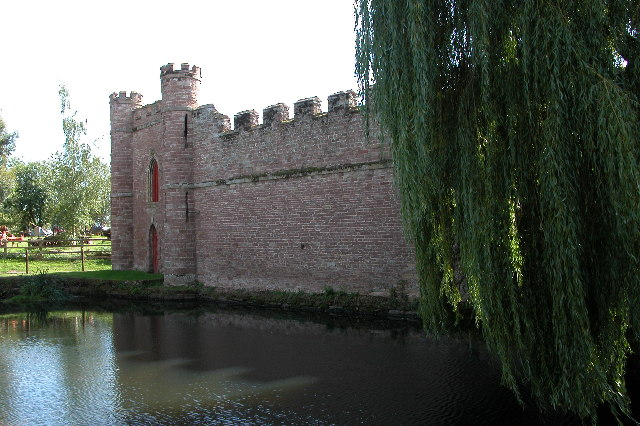
Curtain wall

== Sources ==
- Brooks, Alan; Pevsner, Nikolaus (2012). Herefordshire. The Buildings of England. New Haven, US and London: Yale University Press. ISBN 978-0-300-12575-7. OCLC 759174126.
