= Church of St Mary the Virgin, King's Pyon =

Coordinates: 52.1510°N 2.8219°W

Church of St Mary the Virgin
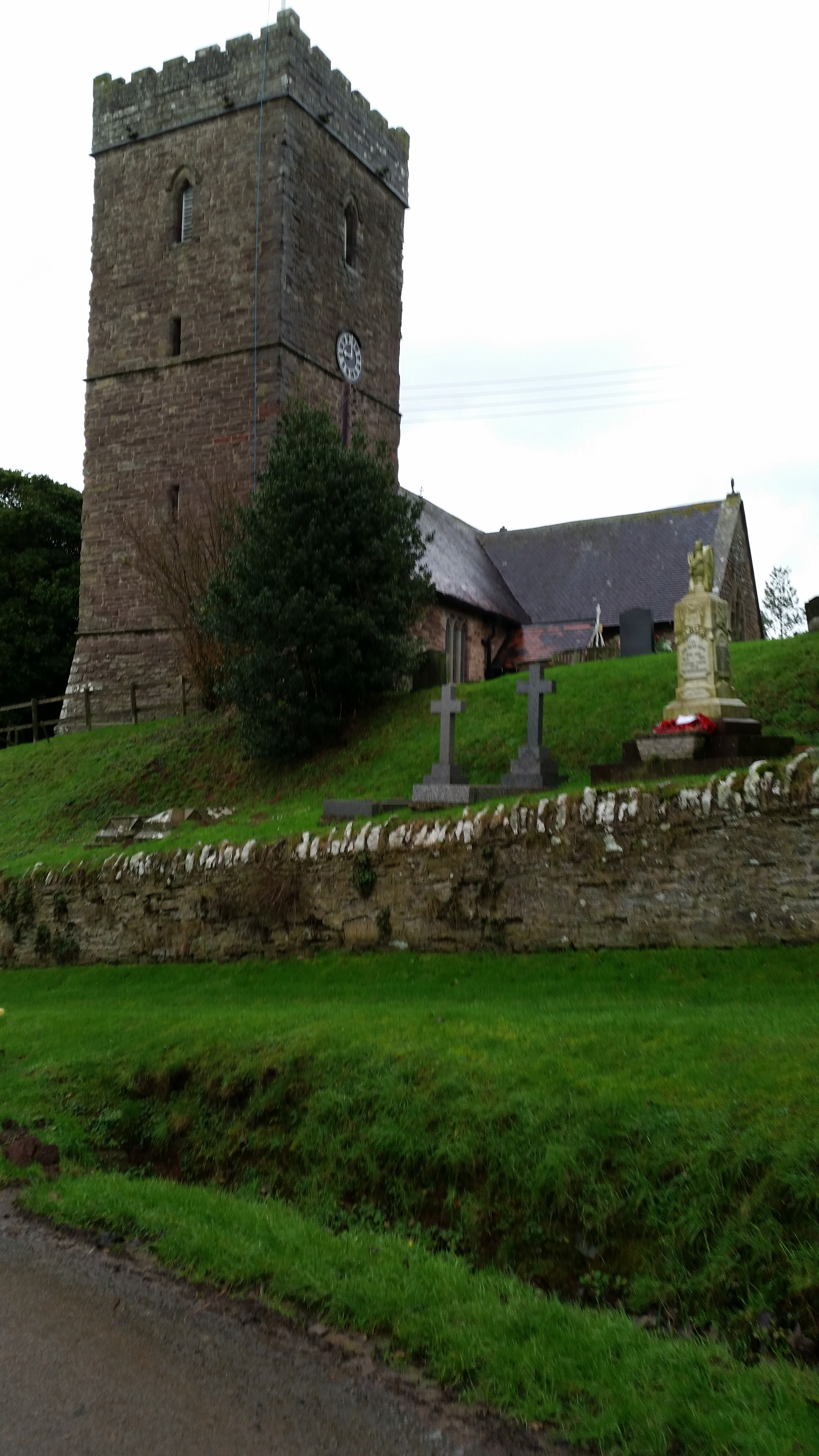
- King's Pyon Church

- Location in Herefordshire
- Location: King's Pyon, Herefordshire
- Country: England
- Denomination: Church of England

History
- Dedication: St Mary

Architecture
- Years built: c. 1100

Administration
- Province: Canterbury
- Diocese: Hereford
- Parish: Parish of King's Pyon

The Church of St Mary the Virgin, in King's Pyon, Herefordshire, England, is a medieval church dating from the 12th century. It is a Grade I listed building. The church is cruciform in plan and dates from the 12th, 13th and 14th century with additions and restoration in 1872. It is constructed from sandstone rubble with sandstone dressings and some tufa with sandstone slate and tile roofs. The earliest surviving masonry is a section of the north wall of the nave, which can be dated to the early Norman period; possibly as early as the late eleventh century.

The church sits on top of a steep slope above a giant redwood tree to the north, planted in memory of Queen Victoria's Diamond Jubilee in 1897. It is one of the Pyon Group of parishes west of Leominster. The parish also includes the small hamlet of Ledgemoor, between Kings Pyon and Weobley, which has its own stone-built mission chapel, and a village hall. Although King's Pyon used to have its own village hall it was demolished almost 60 years ago, and thus the church itself is now the focus of community activities.

== History and description ==
The church dates from the 12th century. The inside of the roof of the nave and south transept date from the 14th century and have a magnificent two-tiered structure of black trefoiled headed wind-braces to each slope, in contrast to the whitewashed ceiling. The square tower dates from the 14th century, in which hang five bells from the early 17th century, and are rung frequently by enthusiastic campanologists. The tower incorporates a three faced clock, which chimes the hour, and was installed in 1872. The church is a Grade I listed building.

Inside the church is an elaborately decorated tomb recess, probably 13th or 14th century, with a chest tomb beneath carrying the alabaster effigy of a man in armour at whose feet lies a stylised lion. His limbs have been amputated, probably when much of the interior decoration of the church was destroyed by Scottish mercenary troops of the Parliamentarians during the siege of Hereford in 1645. Also to be found in the south transept are two memorial windows installed by the King family about a 100 years ago. There is a carved Victorian altar screen at the east end of the church, and another in the west end behind the Victorian font, all in memory of former family members of the congregation as well as numerous memorial plaques and windows which trace the history of the principal families and benefactors of the church over the years. A carved panelled pulpit and a readers lectern sit either side of the chancel.

The Victorian addition of the north transept has recently been refurbished to serve as a community area. The original Norman font of the church is displayed under the memorial window. The recent restoration project of the church was finished at the end of 2017 and also addressed the needs of the last Quinquennial Report. The project was principally funded by the Heritage Lottery Fund, and also included the repointing of the external walls of the chancel and north and south transepts of the church, the relining of the organ roof above the vestry, renewal of the guttering, and the restoration of the mullioned window in the south transept. The most recent project followed two previous restoration projects, over the last 10 years or so, to restore the tower, and to repair the nave and roof of the church.

== Gallery ==
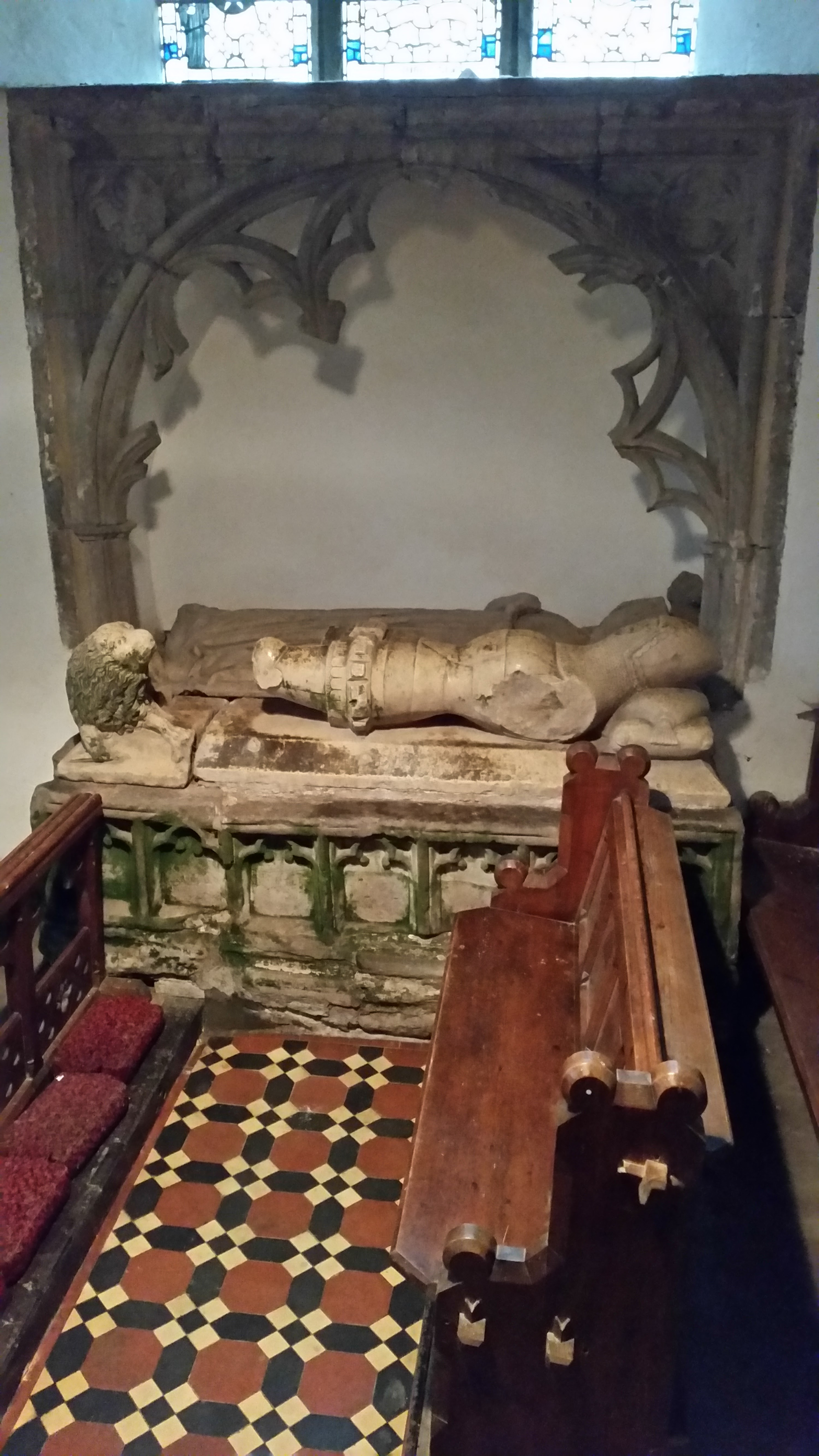
Effigy of a man in armour found in the south transept

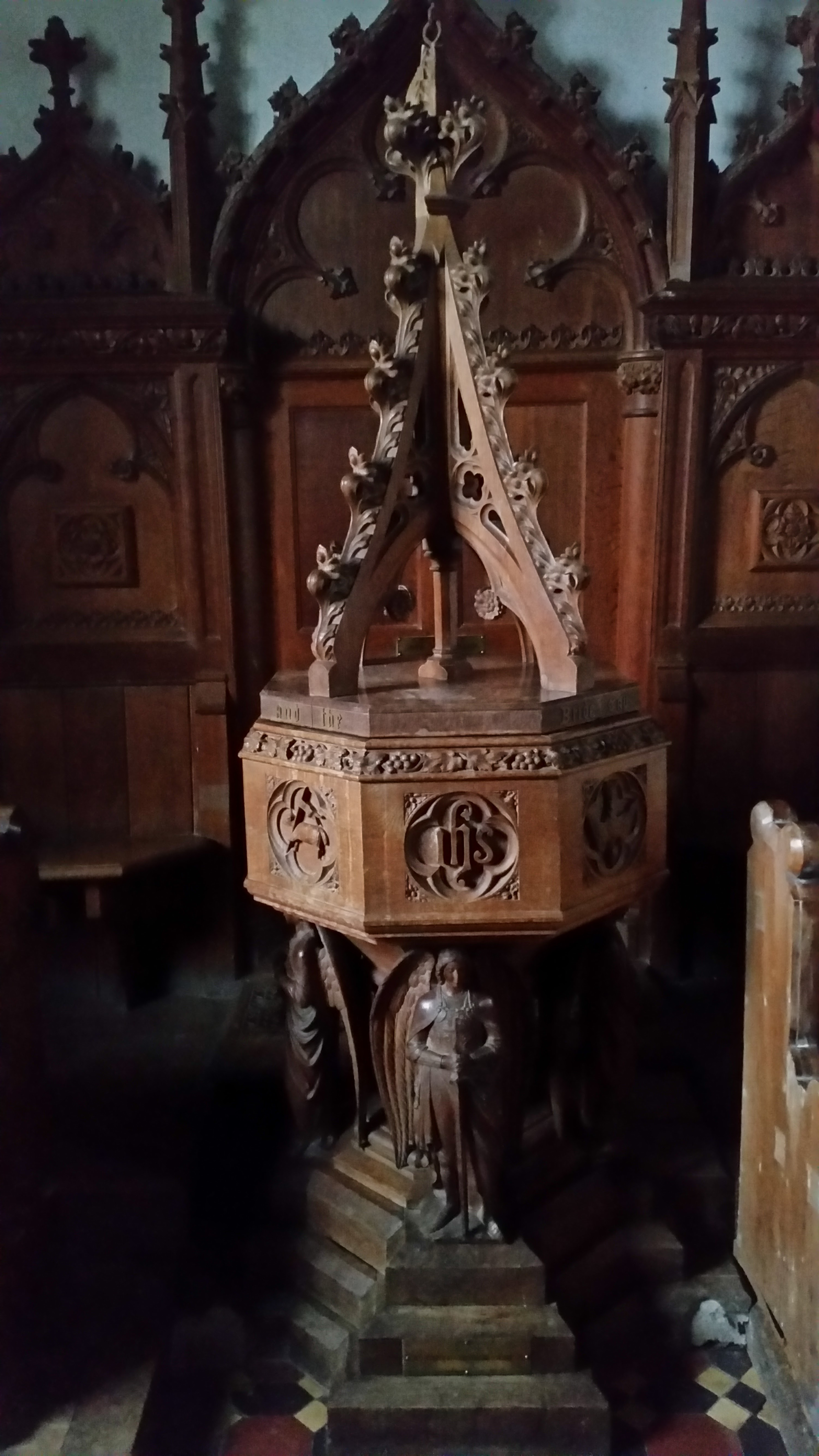
Victorian font found at the west end

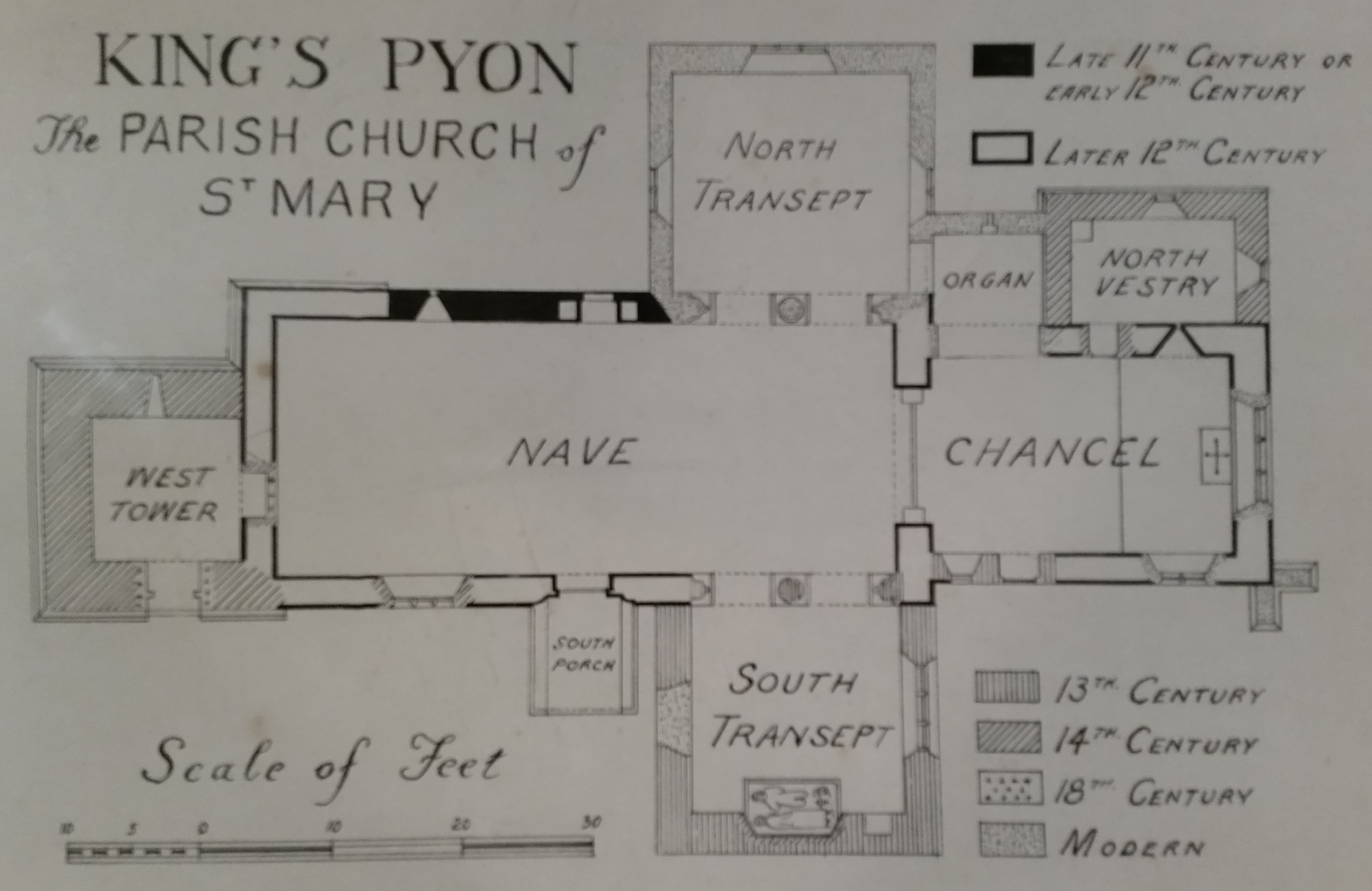
Hand copy of an image found in the Royal Commission on the Historical Monuments of England
