= Court House Dovecote =

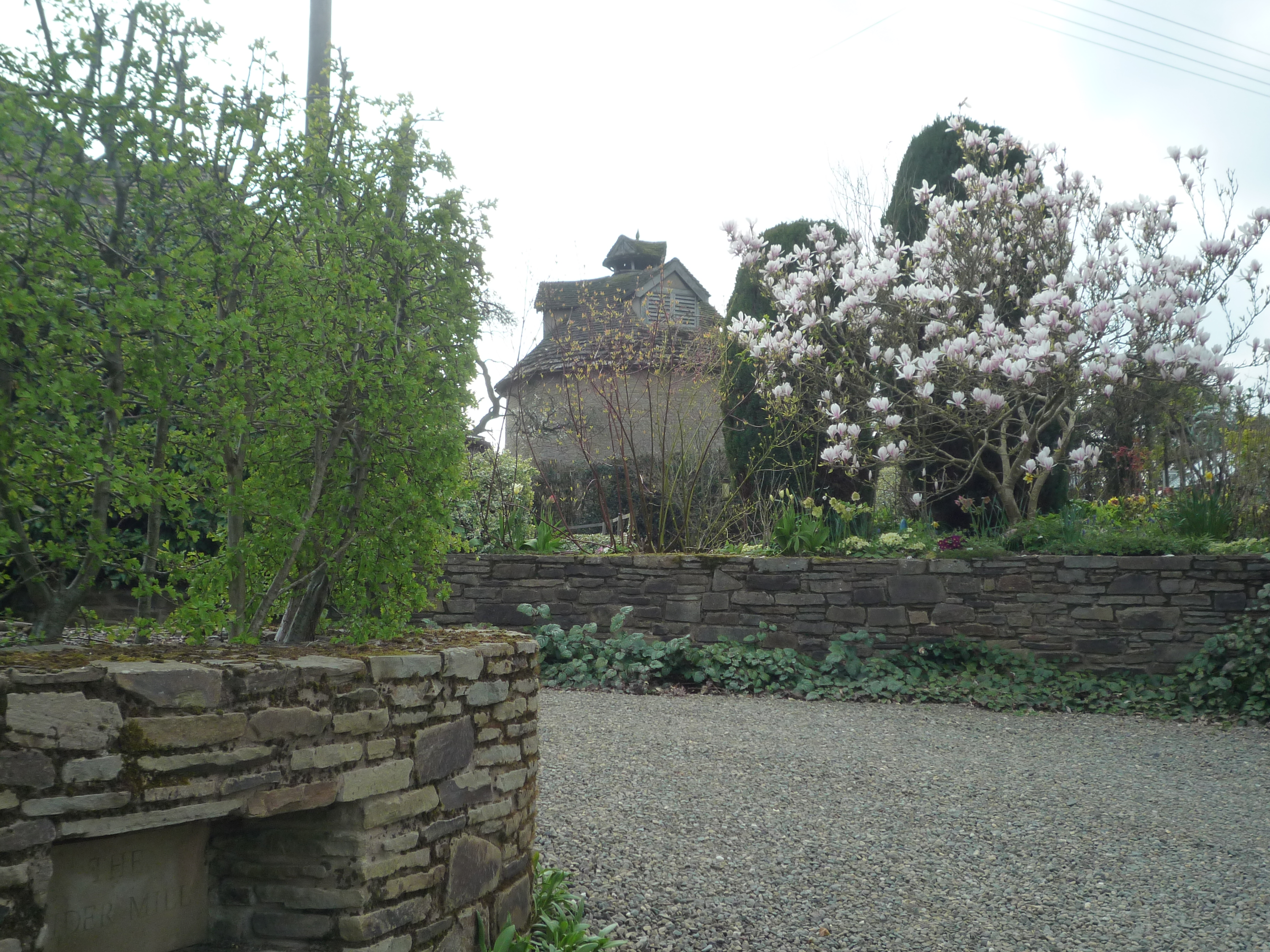
- "A perfectly preserved example"

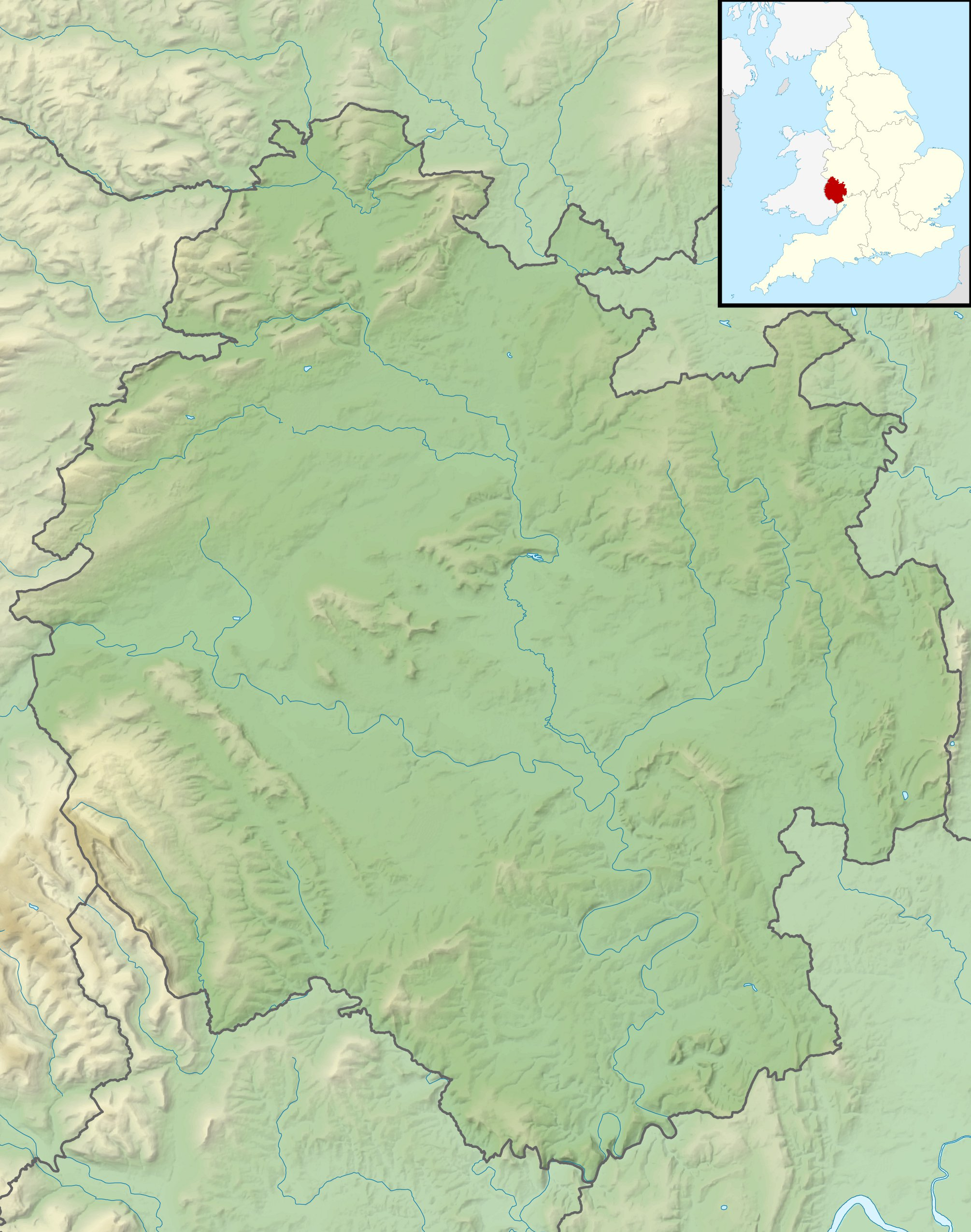
- Location within Herefordshire
- 52.3243°N 2.7479°W
- Type: Dovecote
- Location: Richard's Castle, Herefordshire

History
- Built: 17th century, 20th century restoration

Site notes
- Architectural style: Vernacular
- Governing body: Privately owned

Listed Building – Grade I
- Official name: Dovecote about 10 metres west of Court House Farmhouse
- Designated: 11 June 1959
- Reference no.: 1167549

Scheduled monument
- Official name: Court House Farmhouse Dovecote
- Designated: 1003591
- Reference no.: Dovecot at Court House

Court House Dovecote stands in the village of Richard's Castle, Herefordshire, England. The dovecote is a Grade I listed building and a scheduled monument.

== History and description ==
Historic England suggests that the dovecote dates from the 17th century, although the Royal Commission on the Historical Monuments of England survey of Herefordshire carried out in the 1930s suggested medieval origins. It was restored in the mid-20th century. The structure is circular and is constructed of sandstone rubble. It is surmounted by a conical roof with a lantern and three dormer windows. In his study, A Book of Dovecotes published in 1920, Arthur Owens Cooke notes that this last feature is "unique in Herefordshire". (Note: Cooke, in the Herefordshire chapter of his book, lamented the destruction of so many dovecotes in the early 20th century and implored owners not to permit the growth of ivy on those that remained; "above all set [your] faces against ivy, that most dangerous foe of masonry. To turn the dovecote into a green bower may be picturesque, but means disaster in the end".) The interior holds roughly 600 nesting boxes. The pigeons kept within the structure provided a source of meat, and their droppings were used as fertilizer. Alfred Watkins, in his study Pigeon House of Herefordshire and Gower published in 1891, records the presence of a revolving ladder within the building, by which the nesting boxes could be accessed and eggs extracted. The dovecote is a Grade I listed building and a scheduled monument, Historic England's listing record describing it as "a perfectly preserved example".

== Sources ==
- Brooks, Alan; Pevsner, Nikolaus (2012). Herefordshire. The Buildings of England. New Haven, US and London: Yale University Press. ISBN 978-0-300-12575-7. OCLC 759174126.
- Cooke, Arthur Owens (1920). A Book of Dovecotes. London: T. N. Foulis. OCLC 1965568.
- Royal Commission on the Historical Monuments of England, ed. (1934). An Inventory of the Historical Monuments in Herefordshire. Vol. 3, North West. London: HMSO. OCLC 1443767432.
- Watkins, Alfred (1891). "Pigeon Houses in Herefordshire and Gower". Archaeological Journal. 48. London: Longman.
