= Garway Dovecote =

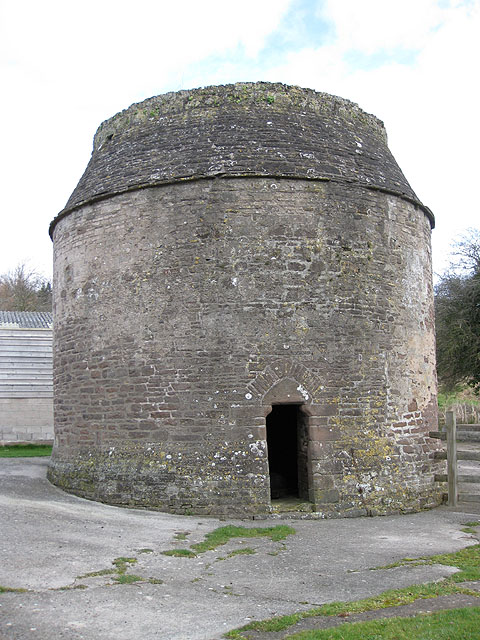
- "the finest medieval dovecote in England"

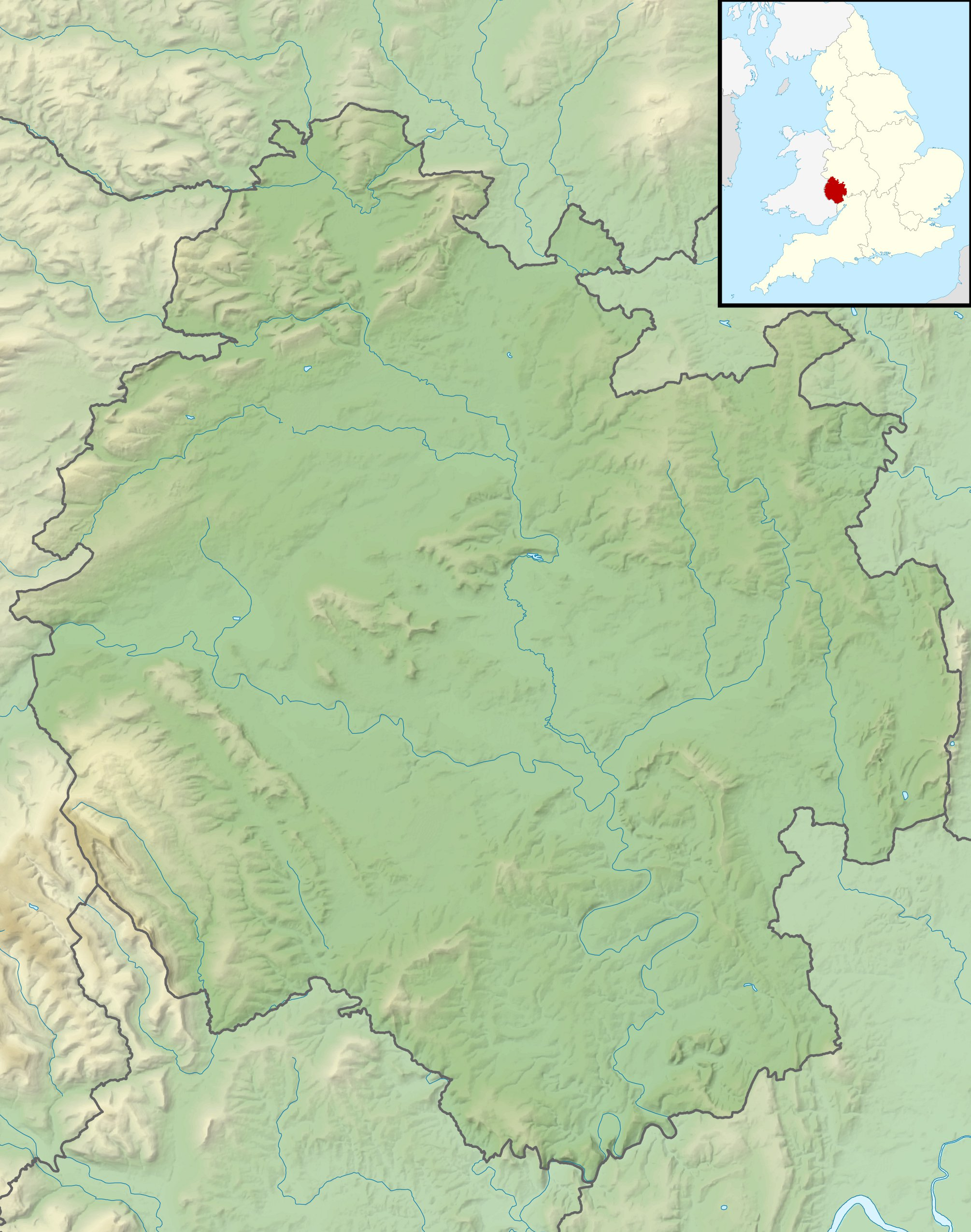
- Location within Herefordshire
- 51.8976°N 2.7929°W
- Type: Dovecote
- Location: Garway, Herefordshire

History
- Built: 14th century

Site notes
- Architectural style: Vernacular
- Governing body: Privately owned

Listed Building – Grade I
- Official name: Dovecot about 80 yards southeast of the Church of St Michael
- Designated: 1 March 1960
- Reference no.: 1348781

Scheduled monument
- Official name: Garway Dovecote
- Reference no.: 1001765

Garway Dovecote stands close to the Church of St Michael in the village of Garway, Herefordshire, England. Historic England dates the dovecote to the early 14th century. The original structure was built by the Knights Templar, and later reconstructed by their successors, the Knights Hospitaller. The dovecote is a Grade I listed building and a scheduled monument.

== History and description ==
The present dovecote dates from the 14th century when it was built by the Knights Hospitaller. Documentary and build evidence suggests that this was a reconstruction of an earlier building erected by the Knights Templar. The Templars had established a preceptory at Garway in the 12th century. (Note: Following the suppression of the Order in 1307, the Templars' lands, including the Garway estate, were given to their rivals, the Knights Hospitaller.) The Church of St Michael, which stands adjacent to the dovecote, was originally the principal building of the preceptory site. The Friends of Garway Church society gives a build date for the dovecote of 1326. (Note: The Friends of Garway Church society indicate that an inscription above the doorway gave the date of 1326, and was deciphered in the 19th century by the Reverend John Webb. Historic England's listing record notes that the inscription is now illegible.) The dovecote is circular and constructed of sandstone rubble with a flattened conical roof. The interior holds 19 rows of nesting boxes. (Note: The Friends suggests that there are 20 rows of nesting boxes.) The pigeons kept within the structure provided a source of meat, and their droppings were used as fertilizer. In his study, A Book of Dovecotes published in 1920, Arthur Owens Cooke described the Garway dovecote at unusual length owing to its "undoubted age [and] the excellence of its workmanship". The Friends' website describes Garway as "the finest medieval dovecote in England", a view supported by Alfred Watkins in his study, Pigeon Houses of Herefordshire and Gower. It is a Grade I listed building and a scheduled monument.

== Gallery ==
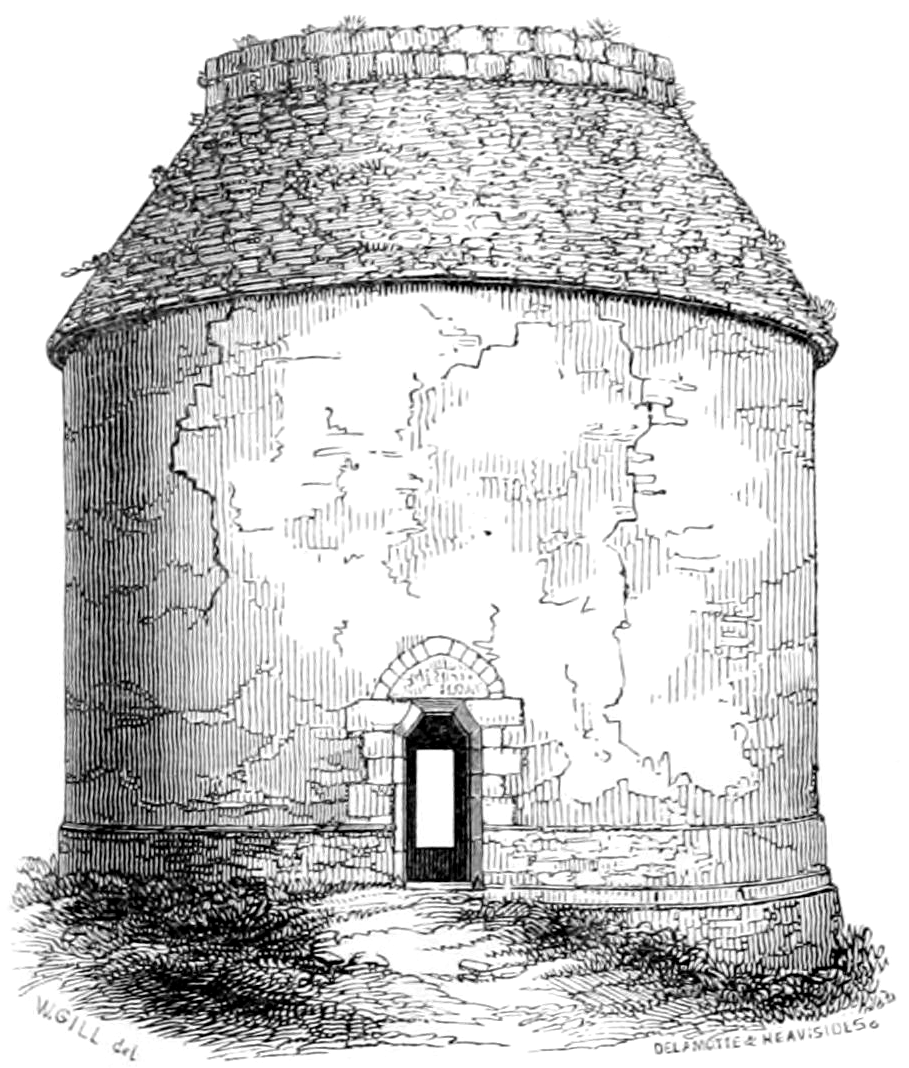
Illustration from the Archaeological Journal, 1845

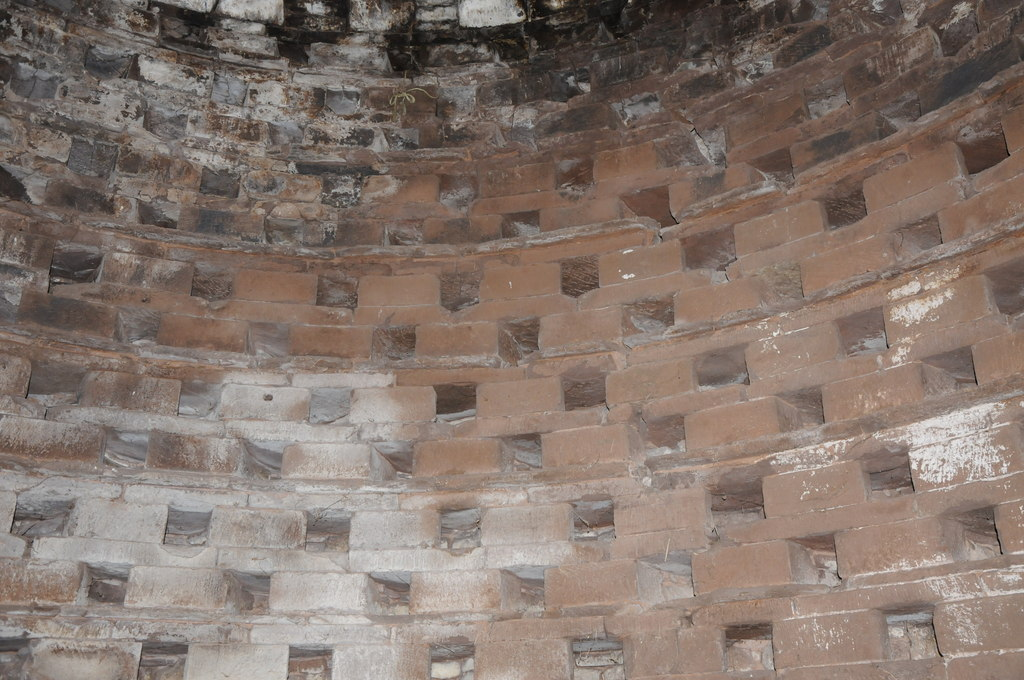
Doveholes

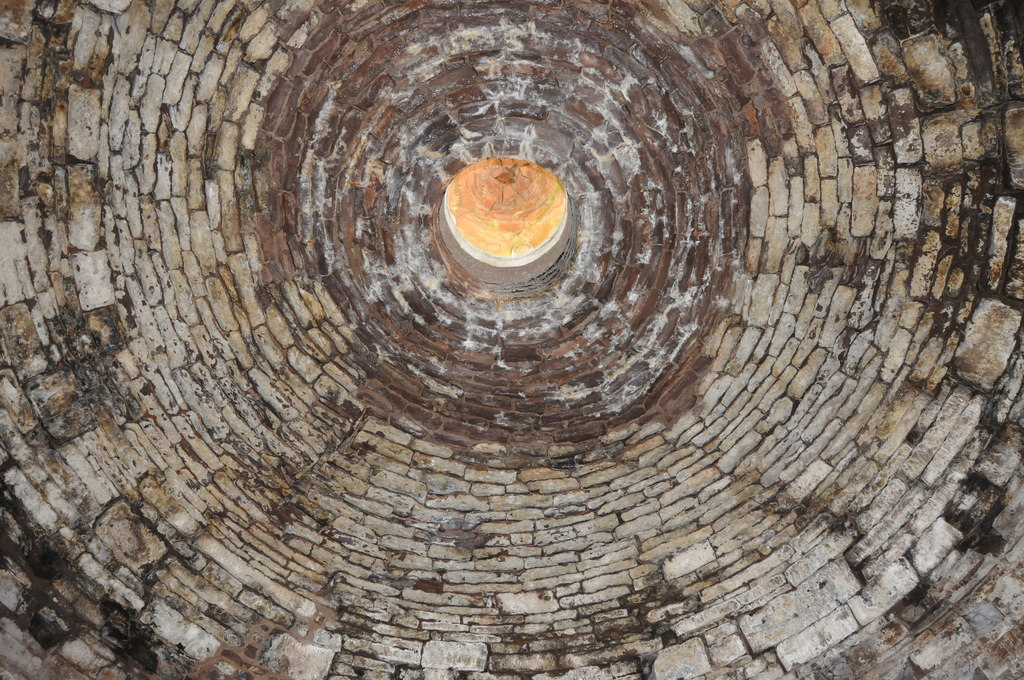
Roof

== Sources ==
- Brooks, Alan; Pevsner, Nikolaus (2012). Herefordshire. The Buildings of England. New Haven, US and London: Yale University Press. ISBN 978-0-300-12575-7. OCLC 759174126.
- Cooke, Arthur Owens (1920). A Book of Dovecotes. London: T. N. Foulis. OCLC 1965568.
- Watkins, Alfred (1891). "Pigeon Houses in Herefordshire and Gower". Archaeological Journal. 48. London: Longman.
