= Wilton Bridge =

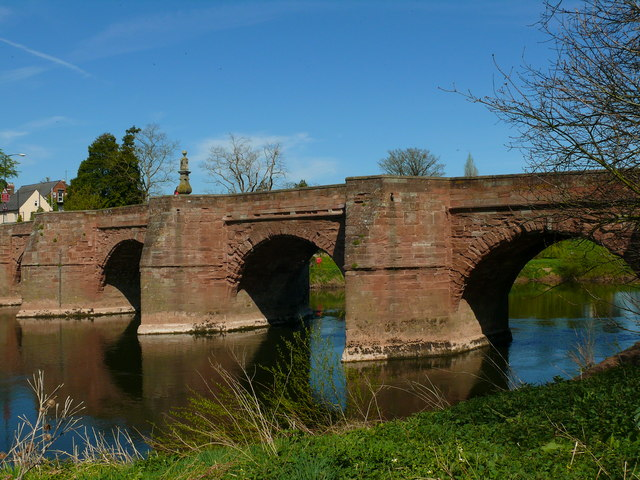
- Wilton Bridge seen from the south side of the river.
- Coordinates: 51.9149°N 2.5976°W
- Carries: B4260
- Crosses: River Wye
- Locale: Herefordshire

Characteristics
- Design: Six spans, segmental arches, red sandstone
- Total length: 85 metres (279 ft)

History
- Opened: 1599

Location
- Interactive map of Wilton Bridge

Wilton Bridge is a Grade I listed bridge crossing the River Wye between Wilton, Herefordshire and Ross-on-Wye, Herefordshire, England.

== History ==
The bridge was authorised in 1597 and completed two years later. One of the arches was destroyed during the Civil War. The bridge was widened and reinforced with concrete in 1914. A sundial was added in the early 18th century.

== Sundial ==
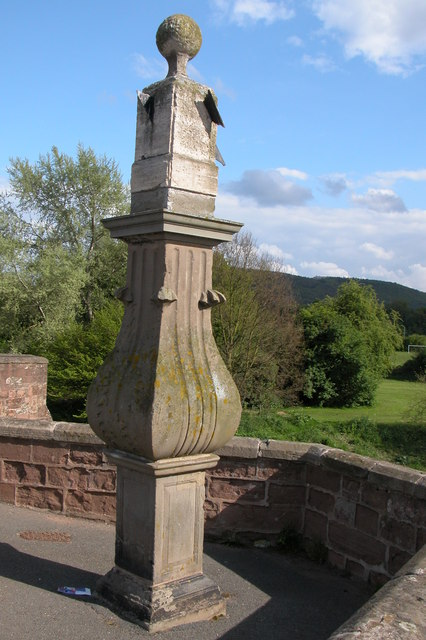
Multifaced sundial

The sundial was commissioned by Jonathan Barrow in 1718. It has an eroded inscription which was recorded by the RCHM as reading

Esteem they precious time
Which pass so swift away
Prepare thee for eternity
And do not make delay.

The sundial was featured in a 1905 published poem by C. M. Paine.

On Wilton Bridge o’er restless Wye
A moss-grown pillar lifts on high
A dial quaint, on whose worn face
Whoever will may pause and trace
Its message to the passer-by.

It shows life’s hours like shadows fly:
Gives counsel wise all should apply;
So lighter thoughts to grave give place
On Wilton Bridge.

Placed where much beauty charms the eye,
These piers both Time and tide defy,
Builded of old with massive grace.
And though men pass with hurried pace.
Content to rest and dream am I –
On Wilton Bridge.

== See also ==
- List of crossings of the River Wye
