= St Mary's Church, Pembridge =

Church in Herefordshire, England

Church of St Mary, Pembridge
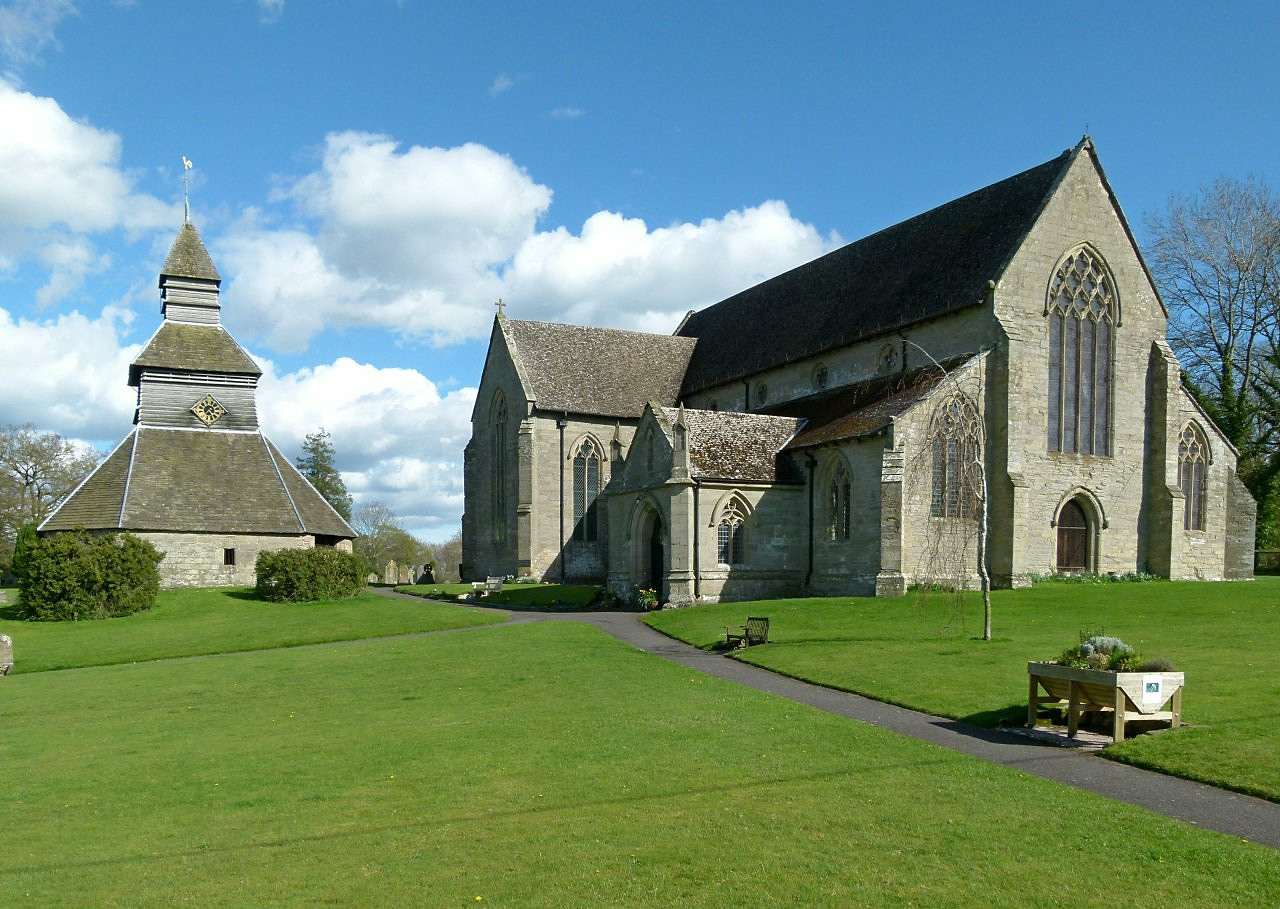
- "Large and impressive"

- Location in Herefordshire
- 52.2173°N 2.8929°W
- Location: Pembridge, Herefordshire
- Country: England
- Denomination: Church of England
- Website: St Mary's Pembridge

History
- Status: parish church
- Dedication: St Mary

Architecture
- Functional status: Active
- Heritage designation: Grade I listed
- Designated: 16 October 1967

Specifications
- Materials: Red sandstone ashlar and rubble masonry

Administration
- Province: Canterbury
- Diocese: Diocese of Hereford
- Parish: Pembridge with Moor Court

Clergy
- Vicar: Rev. Anna Branston

The Church of St Mary the Virgin, Pembridge, Herefordshire, United Kingdom is an active parish church in the Diocese of Hereford. The church is dedicated to Mary, mother of Jesus. It is a Grade I listed building. Its belfry stands separate from the church and has its own Grade I listing.

== History ==
The origins of the church are Norman, of the 12th or 13th centuries, although almost nothing of this early establishment remains. Alan Brooks, in his 2012 Herefordshire volume in the Pevsner Buildings of England series, notes a free-standing pillar piscina in the porch as the only evidence of this period of the church's history. The church stands in the centre of the village of Pembridge, to the south of the high street. The manor was originally held by the de Pembridge family, Norman knights, before passing into the control of the Mortimers, later the Earls of March, in the 13th century. It is probable that the present church was constructed by Roger Mortimer, 1st Earl of March in the early 14th century.

The church underwent a Victorian restoration in 1871, and was again restored in 1903–1909. (Note: Alan Brooks records the architect of the 1871 restoration as William Chick and that of the early 20th century, Rowland Paul.)

St Mary's remains an active parish church, in the Arrowvale group of parishes in north Herefordshire. The church holds a series of modern tapestries, woven by parishioners, which depict the life and history of the village from Domesday to the 20th century. The church is also home to a colony of Natterer's bats.

== Architecture and description ==
Brooks describes St Mary's as "large and impressive". It comprises a nave, with aisles and transepts, a chancel and a porch and vestry. The building material is local sandstone with ashlar decoration. The roof is tiled, a modern replacement for the original slates. The style is predominantly Decorated Gothic.

=== Belfry ===
The belfry stands detached from the church, about 5m to the north-east. Tree-ring dating indicates that the four timbers which form the roof posts were felled between 1207 and 1223, and the first building dates from this period. The belfry underwent complete reconstruction in around 1668. It is octagonal with a shingle pyramid roof. RIBA describes the belfry as "unique in England" and draws comparisons with the Stave churches of Scandinavia. (Note: Brooks also sees parallels with the Stave churches and notes the style is more commonly found in Essex and the east of England, rather than, as at Pembridge, in the west.) The tower was the subject of a detailed study by Andrew Boucher and Richard Morris, published in the journal Vernacular Architecture in 2011. Boucher and Morriss discuss the likely rationale for detached church towers, a type relatively common in Herefordshire, and suggest that the traditional explanation, of the detached tower as a defensive structure, is implausible, given that many, including Pembridge, were originally constructed with openings at the ground floor level.

== Listing designations ==
The church and the belfry are both listed at the highest grade, Grade I.

== Gallery ==
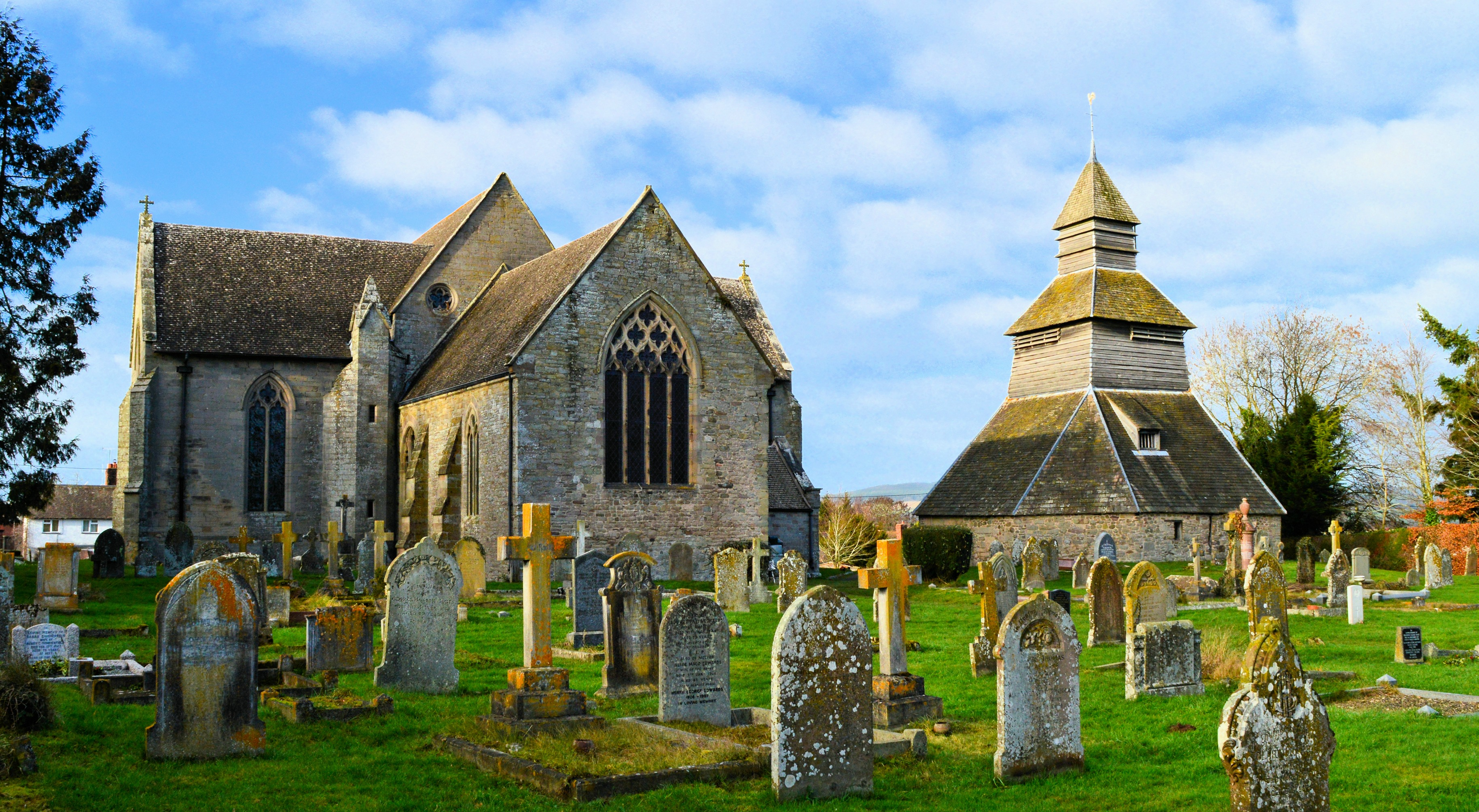
Church and belfry from the churchyard

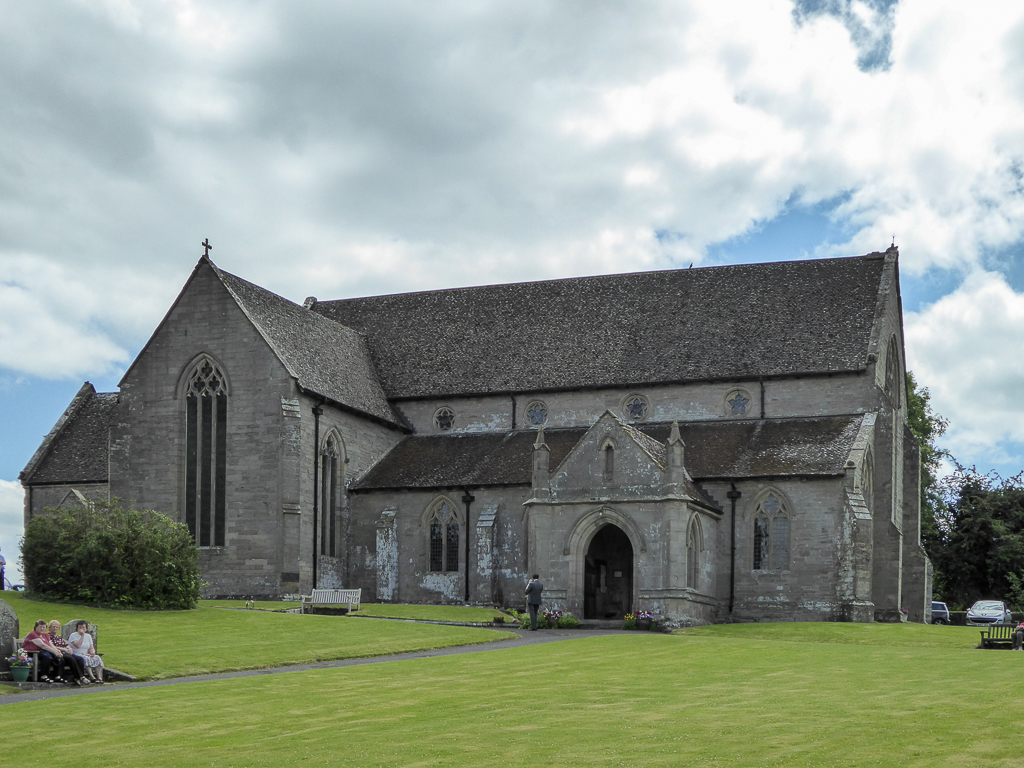
Entrance front

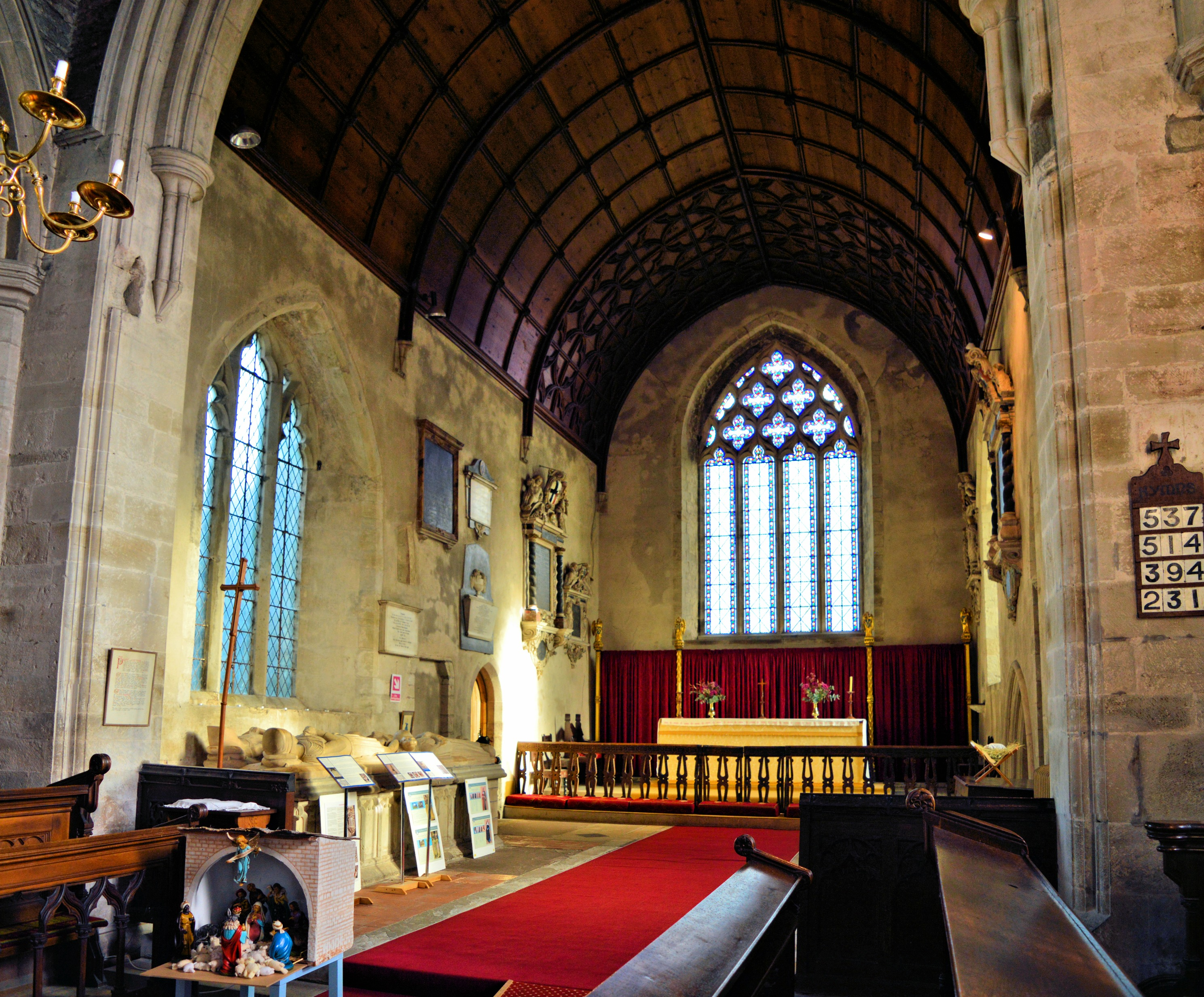
View down the nave

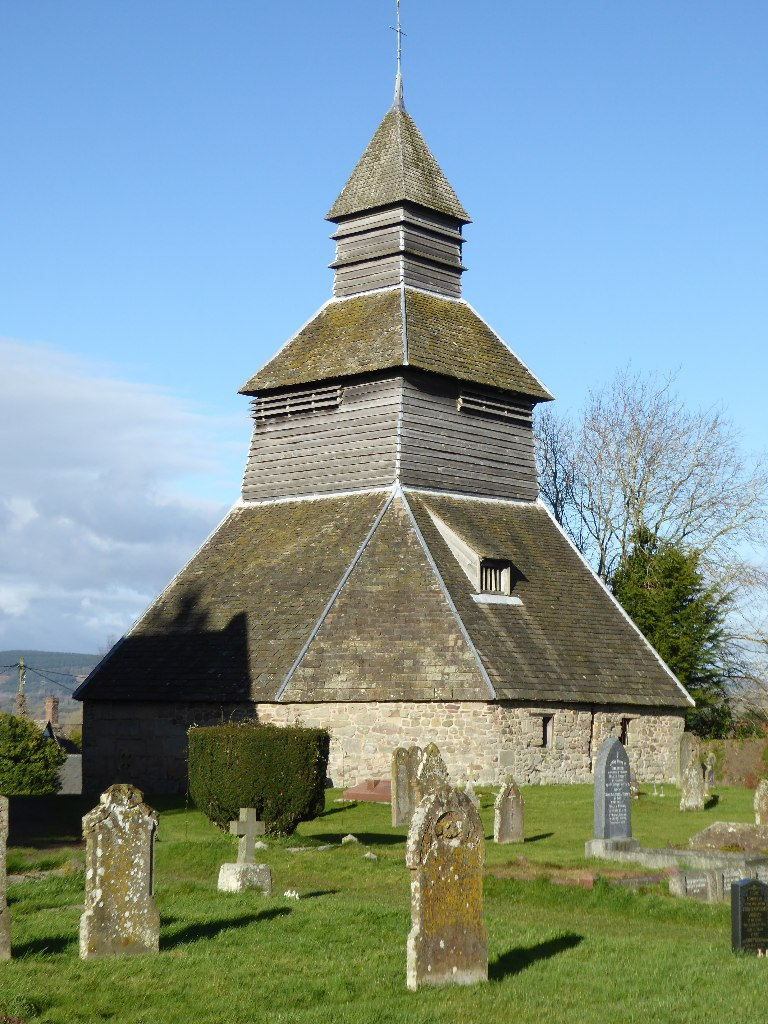
The Belfry

== Sources ==
- Boucher, Andrew R; Morriss, Richard K. (2011). "The Bell Tower of St Mary's Church, Pembridge, Herefordshire". Vernacular Architecture. 42. Taylor & Francis: 22–35. doi:10.1179/174962911X13159065475428.
- Brooks, Alan; Pevsner, Nikolaus (2012). Herefordshire. The Buildings of England. New Haven, US and London: Yale University Press. ISBN 978-0-300-12575-7.
