= Croft and Yarpole =

Parish in Herefordshire, England

Coordinates: 52.28622°N 2.78572°W

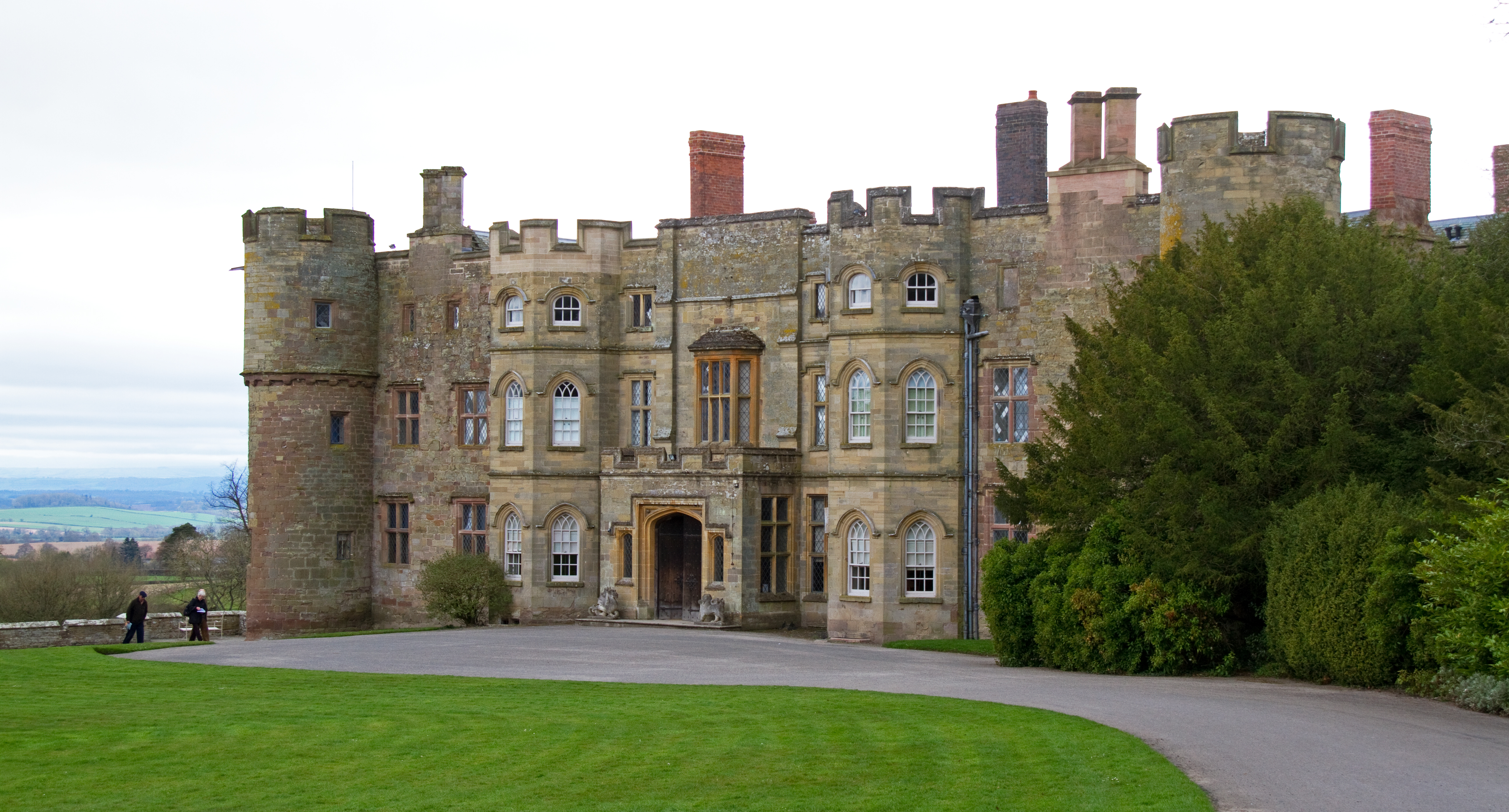
- Croft Castle

- Location within Herefordshire
- OS grid reference: SO465656
  - London: 130 mi (210 km) SE
- Unitary authority: Herefordshire
- Ceremonial county: Herefordshire
- Region: West Midlands
- Country: England
- Sovereign state: United Kingdom
- Post town: Leominster
- Postcode district: HR6
- Dialling code: 01568
- Police: West Mercia
- Fire: Hereford and Worcester
- Ambulance: West Midlands
- UK Parliament: North Herefordshire

Croft and Yarpole is a civil parish in the county of Herefordshire, England, and is 17 miles (27 km) north from the city and county town of Hereford. The closest large town is the market town of Leominster, 4.5 miles (7 km) to the south. Within the parish is the National Trust property of Croft Castle and Parkland.

== History ==
=== Medieval ===
Croft could be Old English for a "small enclosed field", alternatively from the Old English 'cræft' meaning craft, a machine, windmill or watermill. Yarpole, again Old English, derives from 'gear' with 'pōl' meaning a "pool with a weir or dam for catching fish", and was written in c.1145 as 'Garepolla', and in 1212 as 'Yerepol'.

In Domesday Book Croft and Yarpole were separated manors, with Yarpole containing three manorial estates, and at the time of the Norman Conquest all in the Hundred of Wolfhay and county of Herefordshire. Croft, of six households in 1086, contained three smallholders (middle level of serf below and with less land than a villager), two further occupants and one Frenchman (typical indication of a military presence). Ploughlands comprised one lord's and two men's plough teams. In 1066 Edwin held the manorial lordship, which in 1086 was transferred to Bernard (Beard), under William d'Ecouis as tenant-in-chief to king William I.

Yarpole, written as "Iarpol" in Domesday, contained 34.9 households in 1086. The first manor was of 224 villagers, 81 smallholders, 13 slaves, 12 female slaves, six priests, and a further 20 occupants. Ploughlands comprised 29 lord's and 201 men's plough teams. Manorial assets included 60 further lord's lands, woodland of 6.3 leagues and eight mills. In 1066 Queen Edith held the lordship, this passing to in 1086 to tenant-in-chief and king William I. The second manor contained two smallholders and one men's plough teams. In 1066 Aelfric held the lordship, which in 1086 was transferred to Leofwin (the interpreter) who was also tenant-in-chief under the overlordship of Queen Edith for king William I. The third manor was of four villagers and eight smallholders. Ploughlands comprised three men's plough teams. In 1066 Richard Scrope held the lordship, which in 1086 was transferred to Robert Gernon who was also tenant-in-chief to William I.

=== 19th century ===
In the 19th century Croft and Yarpole were separate parishes. Both parishes were in the Hundred of Wolphy, and were part of the union—poor relief and joint workhouse provision set up under the Poor Law Amendment Act 1834—petty sessional division and county court district of Leominster. Through Yarpole parish ran the Leominster to Ludlow road, and, with Croft parish, the road from Ludlow to Presteigne through the village of Bircher, which was a Yarpole parish township. Yarpole was 2 miles (3 km) north-west from the Berrington and Eye station on the Shrewsbury and Hereford Railway. Yarpole population in 1831 was 651 and in 1861 was 630. Its population in 1871 was 586 with 136 houses occupied by 147 families or separate occupiers. The area of the parish was 2,523 acres (1,021 hectares), on which was grown arable crops including wheat, beans, hops, fruit, barley and oats, on a clay soil over a clay and gravel subsoil. The land at Croft included "excellent pasture", and produced wheat, beans, fruit and hops. Croft parish included the alienated township of Newton, Hampton Court 7.5 miles (12 km) to the south. Croft population in 1861 was 55 in Croft and 100 in Newton. In 1871 there was a population of 26 in Croft and 72 in Newton, with seven houses occupied by two families or separate occupiers at Croft, and 15 houses occupied by 16 families or separate occupiers at Newton. Croft parish area was 1,057 acres (428 hectares) at Croft and 507 acres (205 hectares) at Newton. The chief landowner and lord of the manor at Newton township was John Arkwright DL, JP, who lived at Hampton Court. In 1881 the township was listed as growing crops grown of wheat, beans, root vegetables and hops, with orchards and pasture, on a light alluvial soil. Newton population in 1881 was 66. Post was delivered by foot from Leominster, at which was the nearest money order office. Children attended school at Hope under Dinmore, the adjacent parish to the south. There were three farmers, two of whom were also hop growers.

The ecclesiastical parish, which covered both Croft and Yarpole, was in the archdeaconry and Diocese of Hereford and rural deanery of Leominster. The living was a vicarage, which was united with the neighbouring rectory living of Croft, and comprised 93.5 acres (38 ha) of glebe, an area of land used to support a parish priest, and £14 from Bishop Croft's charity of which the Dean and Chapter of Hereford were trustees. The vicar in 1876, who had been instituted in 1839, was also the prebendary of Inkbarrow at Hereford Cathedral, and a rural dean. The Church of St Leonard was described as "a neat stone edifice" of Decorated style, with "a detached tower and spire (containing three bells) at some distance to the south-west". It comprised a nave, a chancel which had been rebuilt in 1853 by the Governors of Lucton School, and a south porch. Documented interior fittings included a font, and "some curious monuments", and an 1873 organ costing £130 "defrayed by the vicar and his personal friends". Sir Gilbert Scott restored St Leonards in 1863 at a cost of £1,705; the church reopened in 1864. The church at Croft, dedicated to St Michael, is described as a "small edifice situated on the lawn in front of Croft castle", comprising a nave, chancel, a bell-turret and an "ancient" monument to the Croft family. This tomb monument is dedicated to Sir Richard Croft (died 29 July 1509) and his wife, Eleanor. Littlebury's Directory stated St Michael's nave was in "great need of restoration".

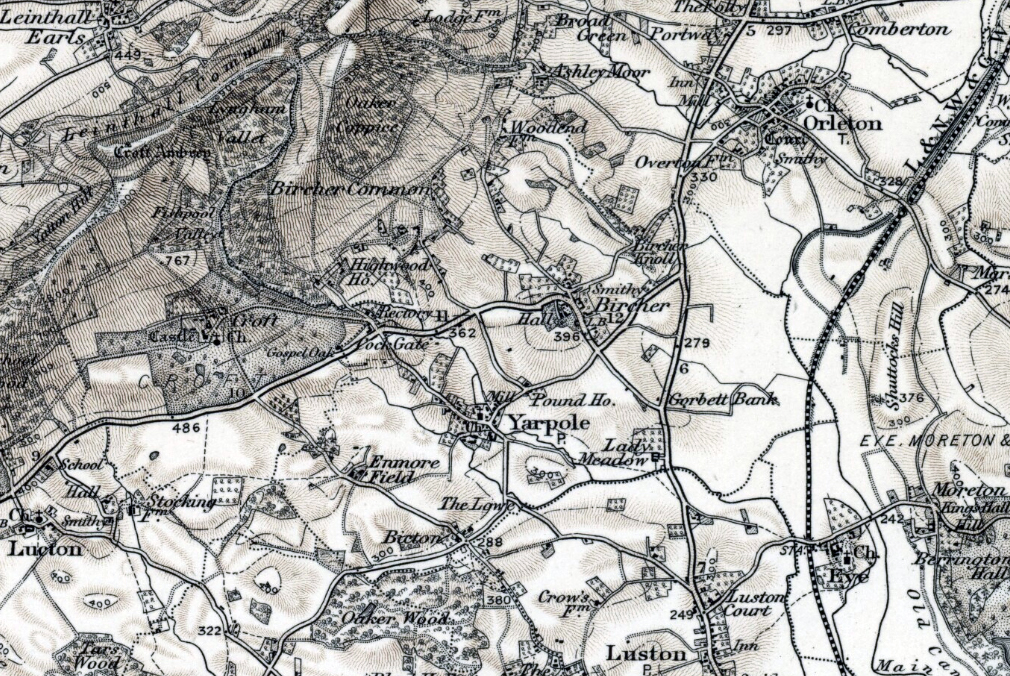
Croft and Yarpole in 1899

Croft Castle in 1876 was the seat of Rev William Trevelyan Kevill Davies, JP, and was described as a "handsome structure, with circular and pointed windows, embattled tower entrance, and four embattled corner towers". The "extensive" park, contained ancient oak and beech trees. Described as being "on an eminence in the north-western north-western part of the park" is the hillfort of Croft Ambrey, "said to have been the camp of the British king, Ambrosius" (Ambrosius Aurelianus), elliptical in form with double ditch and ramparts. From the camp can be seen thirteen counties. Previously the Croft estate was the seat of the Croft family, of Saxon origin. At c.1000 during the reign of Edward the Confessor the manor was held by Sir Bernard á Croft, who was succeeded by Sir Jasper á Croft, who, as a supporter of King Harold, was deprived of the manor, which was given to William de Scochin (William d'Ecouis) by William the Conqueror. The manor was later recovered by the Croft descendants who remained until the end of the 18th century, when the property was sold by Sir Archer Croft, 3rd Baronet (1731–1792) to Thomas Johnes (1748–1816), the translator, MP, landscape architect and social benefactor, who then sold it to Somerset Davies, whose family still held the property in the 1870s. The Crofts had represented Herefordshire in fifteen Parliaments between 1307 and 1695, and at the time of the directory listing, were represented in parliament by Sir Herbert Croft, 9th Baronet, MP, who was living at Lugwardine Court near Hereford.

A House of Commons Abstract of Answers and Returns in 1833 noted three daily schools in Yarpole. The first, endowed by rents of 50 shillings yearly, taught only two pupils, the children of the person who was in receipt of the rent income. The second was a National School teaching 45 males and 51 females from both Yarpole and Croft, supported mainly by a collection after a yearly sermon in the parish church. The parents of eight or nine of the children were able to make a weekly payment of 4d., while all other children gave halfpence weekly towards the cost of an associated sewing school, the mistress of which was paid £5 yearly. The master of the National School received £40 yearly with two-thirds of the salary received from paying pupils. A Sunday School, begun in 1834, taught for free 45 females, 24 of whom attended the National School, and three another daily school. The Croft and Yarpole National School in 1876 had an average attendance of about 60 boys and girls. This later school was built in 1851 at a cost of £1,200. A school house was built in 1873 for £150. In 1876 the Primitive Methodist chapel on Bircher Common was directory listed, as was Bircher Hall, described as "a modern mansion, with very beautiful pleasure grounds and magnificent scenery". Further significant buildings noted at the time were 'Highwood' (Highwood House), between the southern edge of Bircher Common and the crossroads at Cock Gate, which was the seat of Humphrey de Bohun Devereux DL, JP, and The Knoll, the villa residences of Bycroft, and the farmhouse of Lady Meadow.

The Rev. William Trevelyan Kevill Davies of Croft Castle was lord of the manor in 1876. The parish had a post office with sub-postmaster, while post was delivered from and processed at Leominster, which was the post town. The closest money order and telegraph office was at Kingsland. Trades and occupations in the parish but not at either Bircher or Bircher Common were seventeen farmers, including one who was the parish clerk, one also a landowner, one also a blacksmith, and one also a beer retailer & cooper. The sub-postmaster was also a boot & shoe maker, grocer and registrar of births and deaths. Also listed were the schoolmaster, a beer retailer, a further blacksmith, a pump maker, a further boot & shoe maker, a builder who was also a wheelwright, a shopkeeper, a mason, and a sawyer. At Bircher there was the head gardener of Bircher hall, a shopkeeper, a blacksmith, and three farmers including one who was a hop grower, and one also a grocer. At Bircher Common there was a carpenter, a boot & shoe maker, a timber dealer, a mason, a cabinet maker, a plumber who was also a painter and glazier, and four farmers, one who was also a landowner. At the alienated township of Newton there were three farmers, two of whom were also hop growers.

== Geography ==
Croft and Yarpole is approximately 2.5 miles (4 km) from north to south and 3.75 miles (6 km) east to west, with an area of 5.6 square miles (14.5 km^{2}), and is approximately 8 miles (13 km) east from the border with Wales. Adjacent parishes are Lucton at the west, Aymestrey at the north-west, Orleton at the north-east, Eye, Moreton and Ashton at the east, and the three parishes of Kingsland, Eyton and Luston at the south. The parish is rural, of farms, arable and pasture fields, managed woodland and coppices, water courses, isolated and dispersed businesses, residential properties, the nucleated settlements of the village of Yarpole and the hamlets of Bircher and Bicton, and the site of the ancient settlement and waste of Bircher Common. The largely depopulated area of Croft in the western part of the parish contains Croft Castle estate and parkland. Two minor routes run through the parish: the B4362 road from Shobdon runs west to east through the centre of the parish and joins the north to south B461 Ludlow to Leominster road at the east. All other routes are country lanes, bridleways, farm tracks, woodland walks, and footpaths one of which crosses, at a level crossing, the Welsh Marches railway line which runs through the extreme south-east tip of the parish. Watercourses of streams and drains flow north-west to south-east from the high ground of School Wood, Lady Wood, and Common Wood on the escarpment of Yatton Hill, at the north-west of the parish above Croft Castle. These courses feed the Ridgemoor Brook, a tributary of the River Lugg, beyond the parish's south-east boundaries.

== Governance ==
Croft and Yarpole is represented in the lowest tier of UK governance by the ten-member Yarpole Group Parish Council. As Herefordshire is a unitary authority—no district council between parish and county councils—the parish is represented as part of the Bircher Ward on Herefordshire County Council. The parish is represented in the UK Parliament as part of the North Herefordshire constituency.

In 1974 Croft and Yarpole became part of the now defunct Leominster District of the county of Hereford and Worcester, instituted under the Local Government Act 1972. In 2002 the parish, with the parishes of Kingsland, Lucton, Orleton and Richards Castle (Hereford), was reassessed as part of Bircher Ward which elected one councillor to Herefordshire district council.

== Community ==
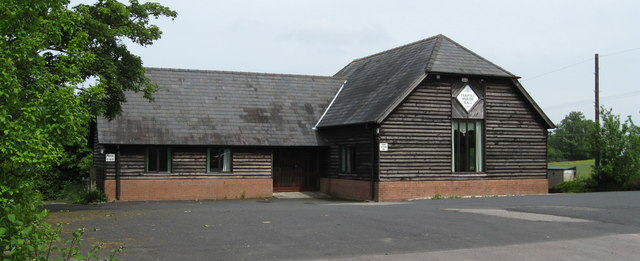
Croft and Yarpole Parish Hall

Parish population in 2001 was 530, and in 2011, 532.

The parish is served by stops for four bus routes, these on the B4362 road, and at Bircher and Yarpole settlements, providing part circuitous connections between Leominster and Wigmore, Leominster and Ludlow, Leominster and Mortimer's Cross in Aymestrey, and between Hereford and Bucknell. The closest rail connection is at Leominster railway station, 5 miles (8 km) to the south-east, and on the Crewe to Newport Welsh Marches Line. The closest hospital is Leominster Community Hospital at Leominster, with the closest major hospital Hereford County Hospital at Hereford. The closest schools are Lucton School, a nursery to sixth form boarding school to the west on the B4362 at Lucton, Luston Primary School to the south on the B4361, and Wigmore High School secondary school to the north-west at the village of Wigmore.

St Leonard's Church at Yarpole is part of the ecclesiastical parish of Croft with Yarpole and Lucton in the Diocese of Hereford, and served by the Leominster Team Ministry. Within the church is Yarpole Community Shop. In the wider parish is a parish hall, and at the north-west the National Trust property of the Croft Castle estate, which includes the house, parkland, woods and two cottages.

== Landmarks ==
There are three Grade I, one Grade II*, and twenty-nine Grade II listed buildings, and thirty-nine scheduled monuments in the parish.

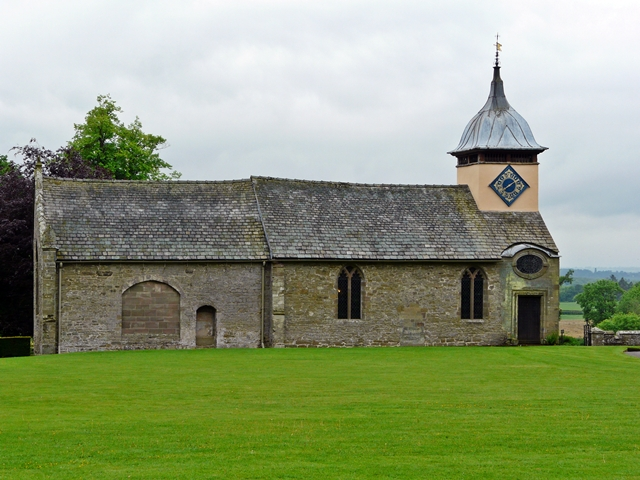
St Michael's Church, Croft

The major landmark and visitor attraction of the parish is the National Trust property of Croft Castle and Parkland, the manor of which was for almost 1000 years the seat of the Croft family. The property comprises the house and gardens of Croft Castle, and 1,500 acres (610 hectares) of park and woodland which includes farmhouses, two cottages and the church of St Michael. The Grade II* listed country house of Croft Castle dates to the 16th- to early 17th-century, was extended in the late 17th, and remodelled at about 1765 and in 1913. The embattled building is in plan four-sided, with circular corner turrets, around a central courtyard.

To the east of the south facade of the house is the Grade I listed Church of St Michael, the former parish church of Croft, which dates to the mid-14th century, was enlarged in the early 16th, partly rebuilt in the 17th, and restored in the 19th. The church comprises a chancel and nave, and a bell turret. Interior fixtures and fittings include in the chancel a timber-beamed roof, which over the altar is internally lowered to provide a curved boarded ceiling painted with clouds. At the north wall of the chancel is the tomb monument to Sir Richard Croft (died 1509) and his wife, opposite a south wall piscina, and next to the altar with its panelled 17th-century reredos.

A Grade II listed stable block, of U-plan and two storeys, 60 yards (55 m) north-east from the house, dates to the late 18th- to early 19th-century. Within Croft Castle woodland, 600 yards (550 m) north-east from the house is Fishpool Valley, a steep sided valley of a depth of up to 150 feet (46 m) and 275 yards (251 m) at its widest, running south-east from Yatton Hill, through which flows a stream dammed to create pools which are fed by two springs to the north and drainage from Bircher Common at the east. The part of the stream dammed by pools extends 1,312 yards (1.2 km) with a drop of 44 yards (40 m). A 13th-century agreement was made between the Abbot of Lathbury and Hugh de Croft for a mill to be constructed on Fishpool Dingle between the land belonging to Hugh de Croft and the Abbot's land to the east at Highwood. In the late 18th century a two-storey pumphouse was constructed at the edge of one of the pools, today Grade II listed. The Iron Age hill fort of Croft Ambrey is conjoined to the Croft Castle parkland woods at the north.

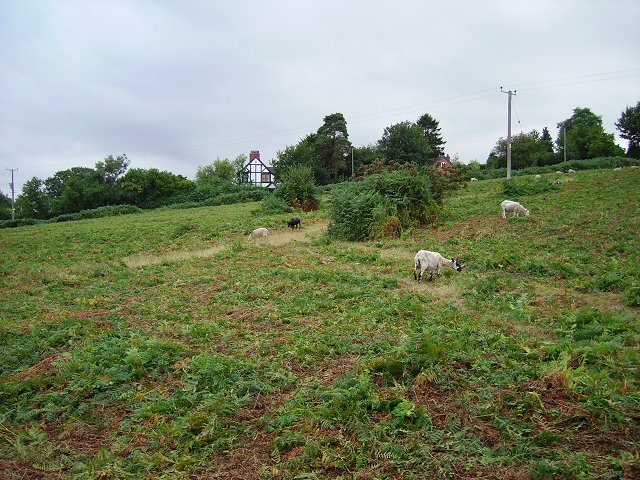
Bircher Common

A further National Trust property is Bircher Common, adjacent to the east from Croft Castle. The common contains a sunken rectangular earthwork of possible prehistoric to Roman origin, 197 feet (60 m) by 328 feet (100 m) and of 3 feet (1 m) depth. At the south-west edge of Bircher Common is the Grade II Croft Lodge, of two-storeys with attic, dating to the early 19th-century house with 20th-century alterations, and east from the common the Grade II timber framed and two storey Woodend Farmhouse dating to the 17th century with 18th- and mid-19th-century changes. To the south of Bircher Common on the B4362 at Cock Gate crossroads is Cock Gate Farmhouse and Cock Gate Cottage, both Grade II listed. The two-storey with attic farmhouse dates to the late 18th century with later repairs; the two storey cottage 17th century of timber framing with brick infill. Facing Bircher Common at its south is Highwood House and landscaped park.

Included in listed buildings in Yarpole village is the Grade II* parish Church of St Leonard on Green Lane. The church dates to the 14th century and was restored by Sir George Gilbert Scott in 1864. The nave and south porch are original but restored, with the north aisle and chancel from the 19th century. The nave is of four bays, and although largely rebuilt, retains reset 14th-century windows, as does the north aisle. Internal architectural details, fixtures and fittings include a chancel organ, a chancel priest door, a 14th-century chancel arch, a nave piscina, and a 13th-century octagonal font with 19th-century base. To the south from the church is a Grade I listed 13th-century detached bell tower. The tower, of square plan, was restored in 1910. It comprises a dressed stone and rubble base, with an arch portal opening at the north, below an angled shingle roof leading to a weatherboarded upper tower below a shingle pyramid spire.

All other buildings and structures in Yarpole are Grade II listed. To the north from the church is Church House, dating from the 17th century with later alterations and restoration, it is a farmhouse of L-plan, two storeys and timber framed. To the north from Church House are two mills, one a cider mill with attached cowhouse, the other a corn mill. The cider mill dates to the 17th century and heightened in the 19th, is timber framed and weatherboarded, with loft. The corn mill further north is 18th century with 19th-century enlargement, and of part two storeys. Outside the village to the south is Lady Meadow, a farmhouse dating to the early 17th century, with later restoration, the west range being 17th century, the north, 18th. The house is L-plan, timber-framed, with an external chimney stack, and of two storeys. The interior contains an early 18th-century staircase.

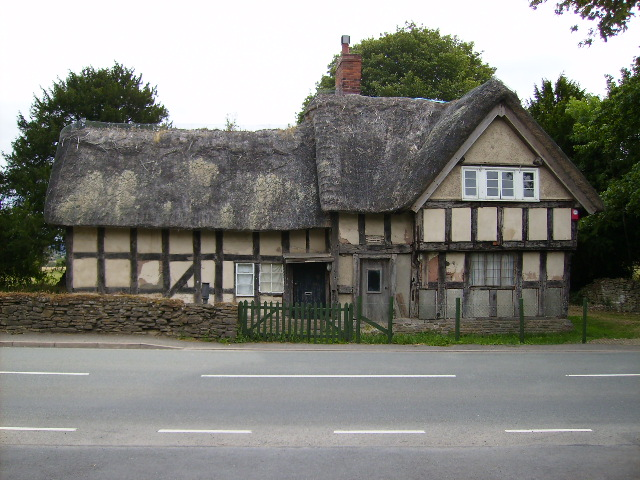
The Knoll cottage at Bircher

The village of Bircher contains eight listed buildings and structures including three farmhouses in the north of the village, two dating to the 17th century, and one to the 16th. Bircher Hall is a mid-18th-century two storey house with 19th-century changes, and with a hipped roof, stuccoed brick walls and a north entrance with Doric columns supporting a pediment. The hall includes gardens, a kitchen garden and parkland. The Knoll, to the east from the B4362 road at the south of the village, is a house dating to the mid-18th century, and of two storeys. The walls are ashlar dressing over brick, the south facing entrance with stone surround with pilasters and fanlight, being the central of three bays with sash windows, with window and balcony above. Further north, on the same side of the road is Knoll Cottage, a two-storey early 17th-century house, timber framed with render infill, at the time of listing split into two dwellings, that at the north a simple range, that at the south of greater height with cross gable and part jettied, and both units thatched. On the opposite side of the road to The Knoll is a mid-18th-century dovecote on Old Barn Court (entrance drive) of square plan, red brick, two levels, and cross gabled with clock turret above. Also to the north from The Knoll is The Court House, which dates to the 17th century, and heightened in the 18th, of timber framing with roughcast render infill, of two storeys with two entrances, with tiled roof and two brick chimney stacks, one central. At the Bircher Common Turn crossroad on the B4362 road 800 yards (732 m) west from Bircher, is Croft and Yarpole Cross, a war memorial commemorating 21 men who died in the First World War and four who died in the Second. When unveiled on 3 June 1920 the ceremony was attended by Hensley Henson, the Bishop of Hereford.
