= Bircher Common =

Lowland heath in Herefordshire, England

Coordinates: 52.29°N 2.79°W

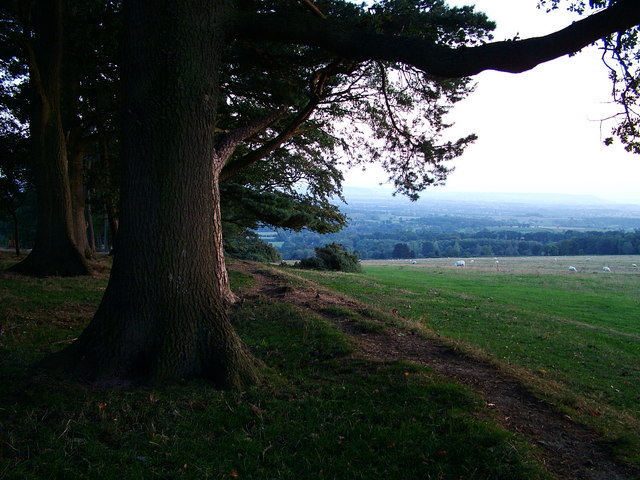
Bircher Common from the edge of Oaker Coppice

Bircher Common is an area of lowland heath in the civil parish of Croft and Yarpole in Herefordshire, England, and 6 miles (10 km) north from Leominster. The common, owned by the National Trust, is adjacent at the west to Croft Castle, a further National Trust Property. Croft Ambrey, an Iron Age hill fort, is to the north-west within the border of the neighbouring parish of Aymestrey.
