= Yatton, Aymestrey =

Hamlet in Aymestrey, Herefordshire, England

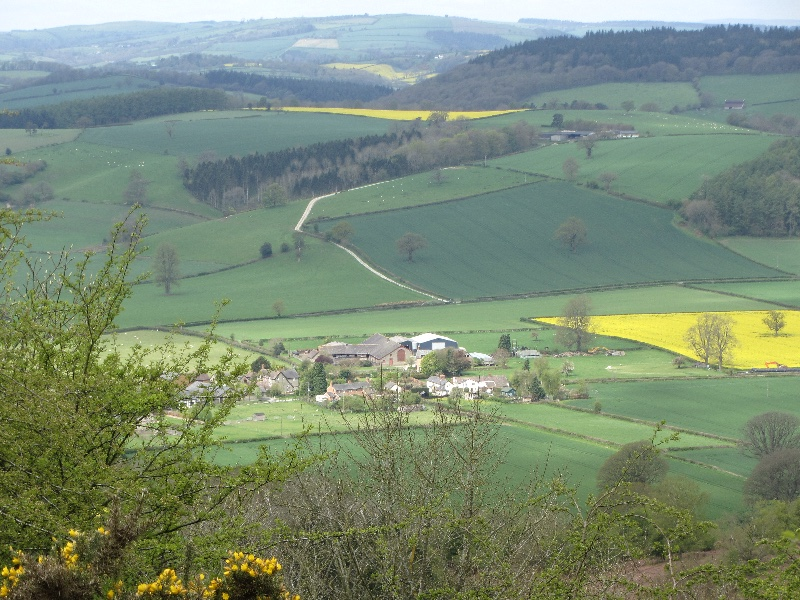
From Yatton Hill

Yatton is a hamlet in the civil parish of Aymestrey in north-western Herefordshire, England. In 1870–72, the township had a population of 214.

The hamlet is located at 52°17′58″N 02°49′54″W, about 8 miles (13 km) north-west of Leominster and 12 miles (19 km) south-west of Ludlow. It is just off the A4110 road.

== History ==
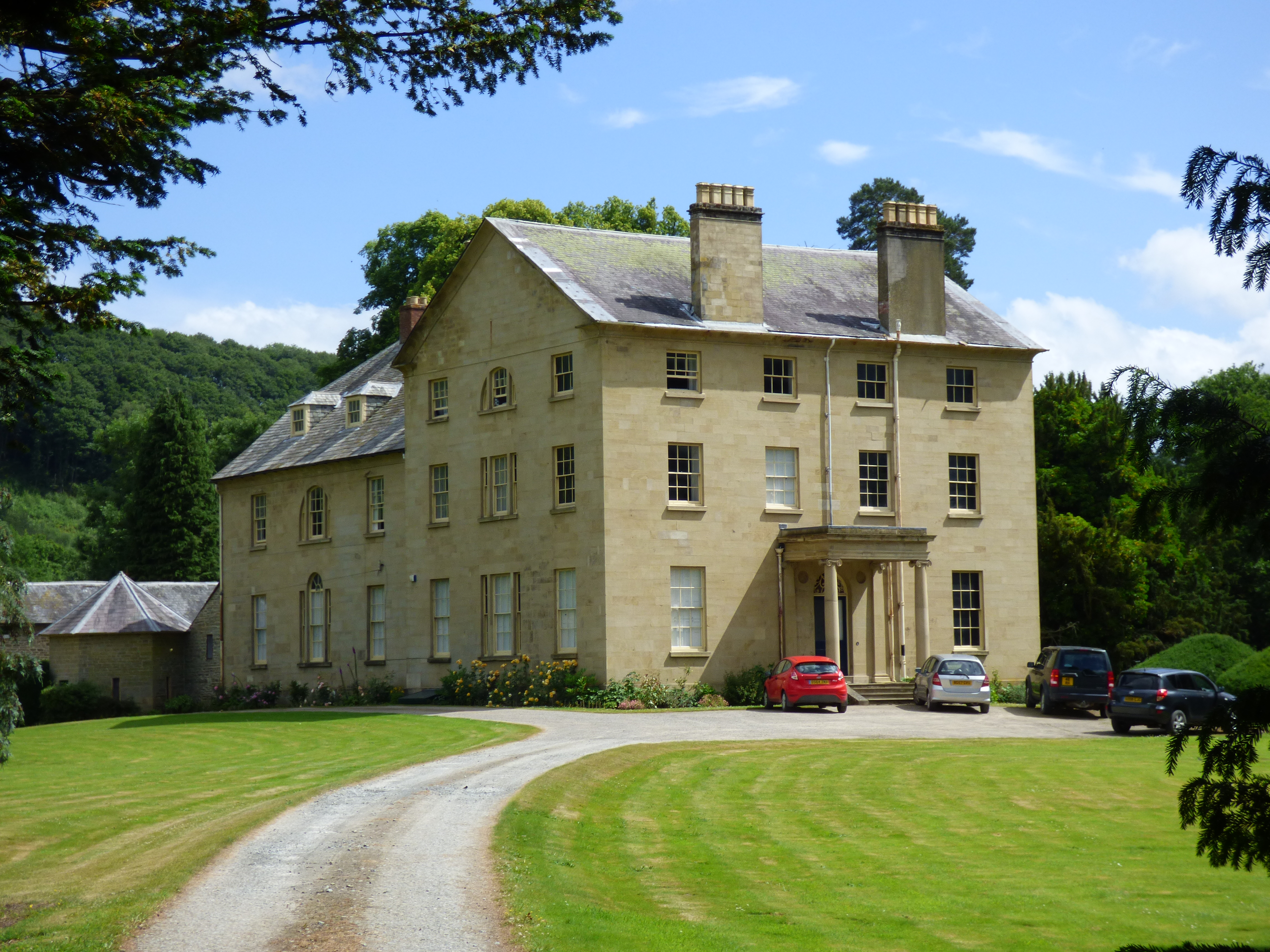
Yatton Court

Yatton Court was built in 1780 on top of an older site. It was owned by John Woodhouse in the early 19th-century.

The hamlet contains some brick-arched barns and old cottages, converted barns and large farmhouses and lies close to Croft Castle and its estate; the Mortimer Trail waymarked walk passes close by. The area was formerly the site of a large stone quarry but the site has been reclaimed, landscaped and replanted. The local schools are Wigmore Primary School and Wigmore High School.
