= Bicton =

Bicton can refer to:

United Kingdom

- Bicton, Devon, England
  - Bicton College
  - Bicton House, a country house on the campus of Bicton College
- Bicton, Herefordshire, England
- Bicton, Shrewsbury, Shropshire (a village and parish), England
- Bicton, South Shropshire, England
- Bicton, Pembrokeshire, Wales

Australia

- Bicton, Western Australia
  - Electoral district of Bicton
