= Pipe Aston =

Village and civil parish in Herefordshire, England

Coordinates: 52.344°N 2.793°W

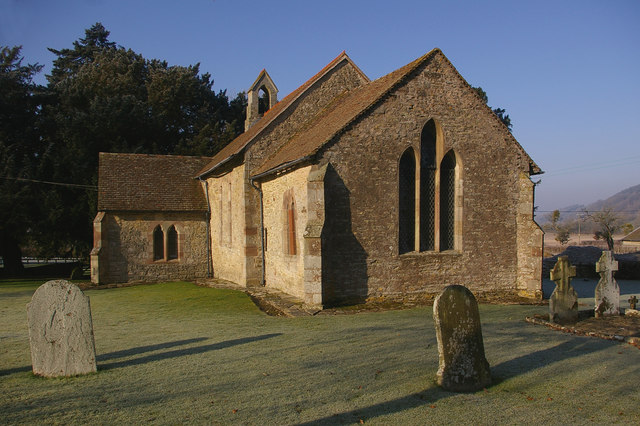
- St. Giles church

- Location within Herefordshire
- Population: 24
- Civil parish: Pipe Aston
- Unitary authority: County of Herefordshire
- Ceremonial county: Herefordshire
- Region: West Midlands
- Country: England
- Sovereign state: United Kingdom
- Police: West Mercia
- Fire: Hereford and Worcester
- Ambulance: West Midlands

Pipe Aston is a small village and civil parish in the far north of Herefordshire, close to the border with Shropshire. It has a population of about 24.

It is situated on the Wigmore to Ludlow road. National Cycle Network route 44 passes through, en route between Ludlow and Leominster. The village is just north of Elton. Mortimer Forest is in the vicinity and the High Vinnalls hill is in the parish.

The village features the 12th century Grade I listed St Giles parish church.
