= Aymestrey burial =

Beaker cist discovered in Herefordshire, England

Coordinates: 52.292305°N 2.837884°W

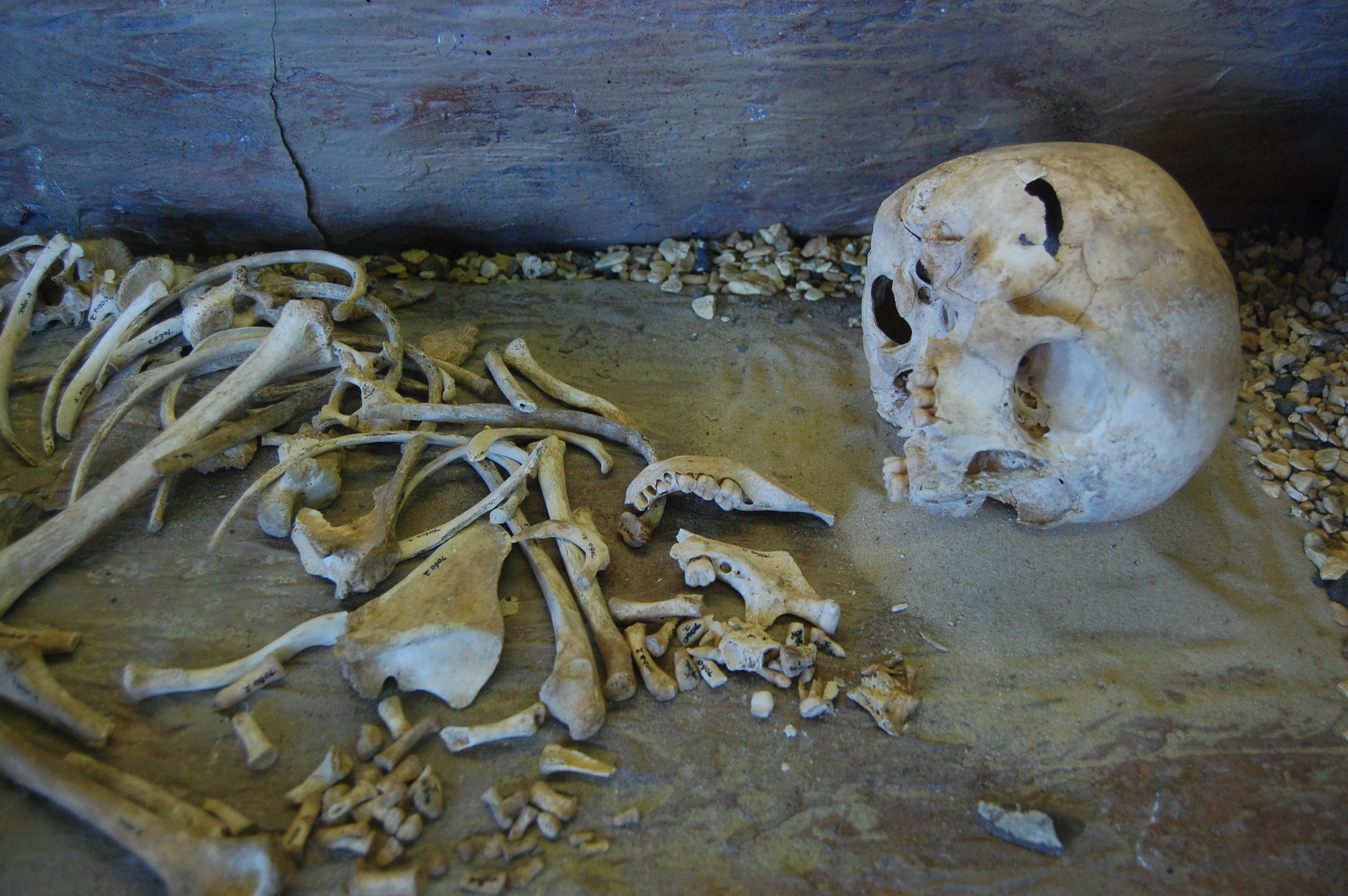
The skull and other bones, with the flint knife in the foreground, at Leominster Museum

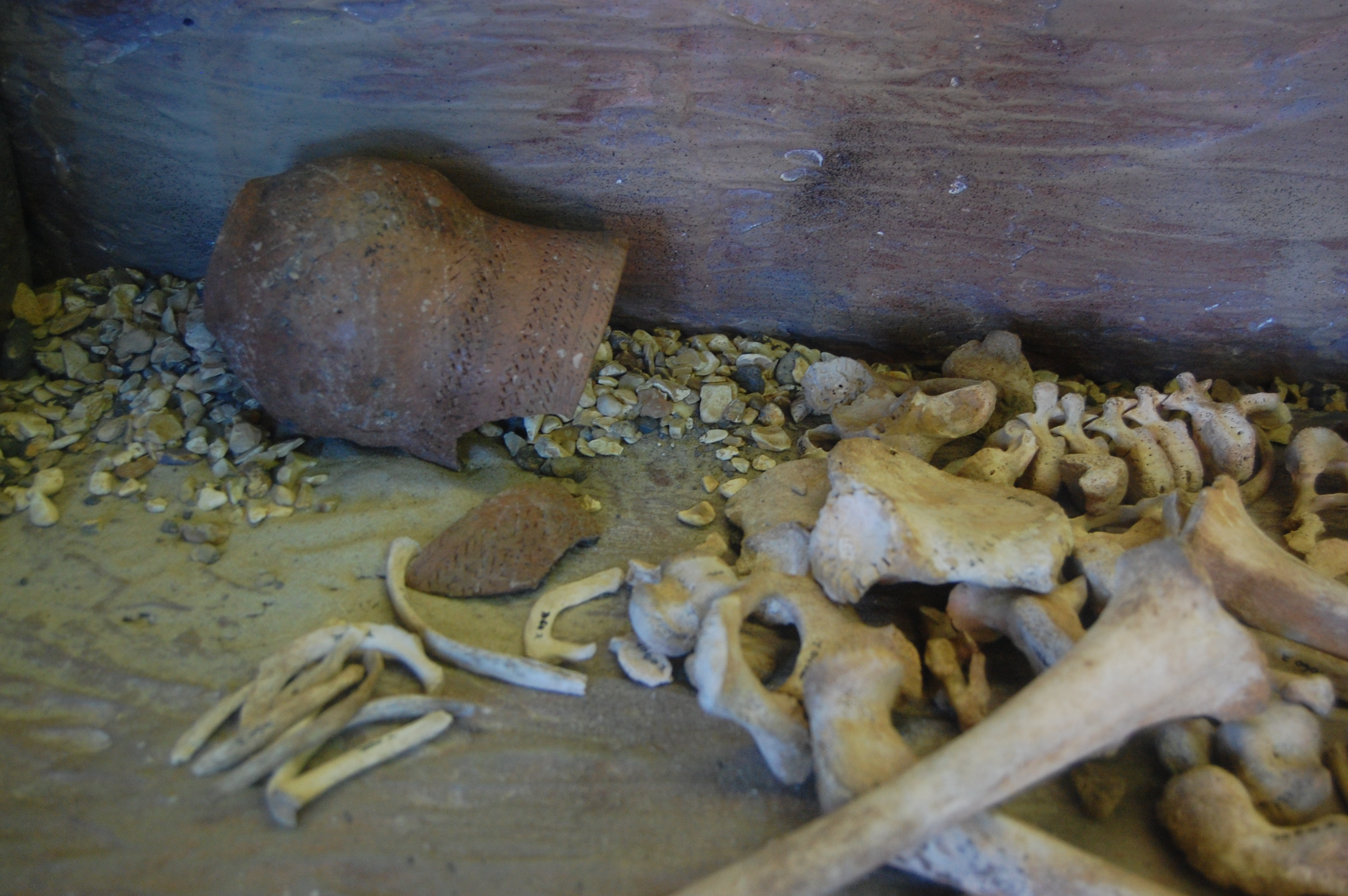
The beaker, on display at Leominster Museum

The Aymestrey burial was a beaker cist at Aymestrey, Herefordshire, England. The remains and objects are now in a recreated cist, at Leominster Museum.

== Discovery ==
While working a gravel quarry at Aymestrey, in June 1987, employees of ARC unearthed a hole with a stone lining, and human remains visible within. They called in archaeologists from Hereford and Worcester County Council, who carried out an excavation and discovered a stone-lined burial pit containing the body of a child, lying on its left-hand side in a foetal position. Alongside the body were an earthenware bell beaker and a flint knife. The burial was dated to the Early Bronze Age.

== Site ==
The site lies between the Iron Age hill forts at Pyon Wood and Croft Ambrey, and alongside a tributary of the River Lugg. A similar beaker burial site was also discovered in 1987 in Achavanich, Caithness, Scotland.

== Recreation ==
The burial has been recreated as a display at Leominster Museum (pictured).
