= High Vinnalls =

Coordinates: 52.347°N 2.765°W

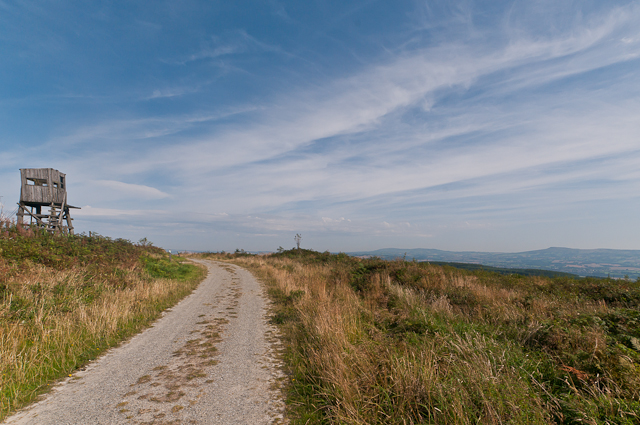
- The summit

Highest point
- Elevation: 375 m (1,230 ft)
- Prominence: 248 m (814 ft)
- Listing: Marilyn

Geography
- Location: Herefordshire, England
- Parent range: North West Herefordshire Hills or Shropshire Hills
- OS grid: SO477725

High Vinnalls is a hill in the English county of Herefordshire, though commonly considered a member of the Shropshire Hills. It is located in the parish of Pipe Aston, near the town of Ludlow, and is covered by Mortimer Forest (and ancient hunting forest).

The Mortimer Trail runs for 30 miles (48 km) between Ludlow and Kington and passes over High Vinnalls.

Before the Norman Conquest of 1066, High Vinnalls marked the western edge of the manor of Richard's Castle. The Mortimer family were then the Norman lords of the region for around 300 years.

The High Vinnals is home to the Ludlow parkrun, which held its first event on February 13, 2016. That inaugural event had 139 participants and 18 volunteers. To date, after 399 events, there have been 8,897 different finishers and a total of 34,599 finishes.

The course is slightly undulating and features the infamous "Dip of Doom." The parkrun takes place every Saturday at 9 a.m. It is free to participate, so please come and run, walk, or volunteer.
