= Lucton School =

Location
- Lucton, Herefordshire, HR6 9PN; England; 52.2759°N 2.8254°W

Information
- Type: Private day and boarding
- Motto: Floreat Luctona; May Lucton flourish
- Religious affiliation: Christian (non-denominational)
- Established: 1708; 318 years ago
- Founder: John Pierrepont
- Department for Education URN: 117045 Tables
- Chairman of the Board of Governors: A Khan
- Headmaster: Andrew Allman
- Staff: c.100
- Gender: Co-educational
- Age: 6 mths to 18 yrs
- Enrolment: 350
- Houses: Collingwood, Drake, Nelson, Rodney
- Colour
- Publication: The Luctonian
- Registered charity Number: 518076
- ISI number: 6662
- Website: http://www.luctonschool.org

Lucton School, is a private, co-educational, day and boarding school in Lucton near Leominster, Herefordshire, England. It was founded in 1708 as a boys' school and began admitting girls in the 1970s. It currently has c.350 pupils on roll, aged from six months to 18 years. The school operates as a registered charity and is a member of the Independent Schools Association, the Independent Association of Preparatory Schools, the Independent Schools Council Information Service and the Boarding Schools Association. Fees are currently £29,955 for full boarders, £24,750 for weekly boarders and £12,945 for day pupils.

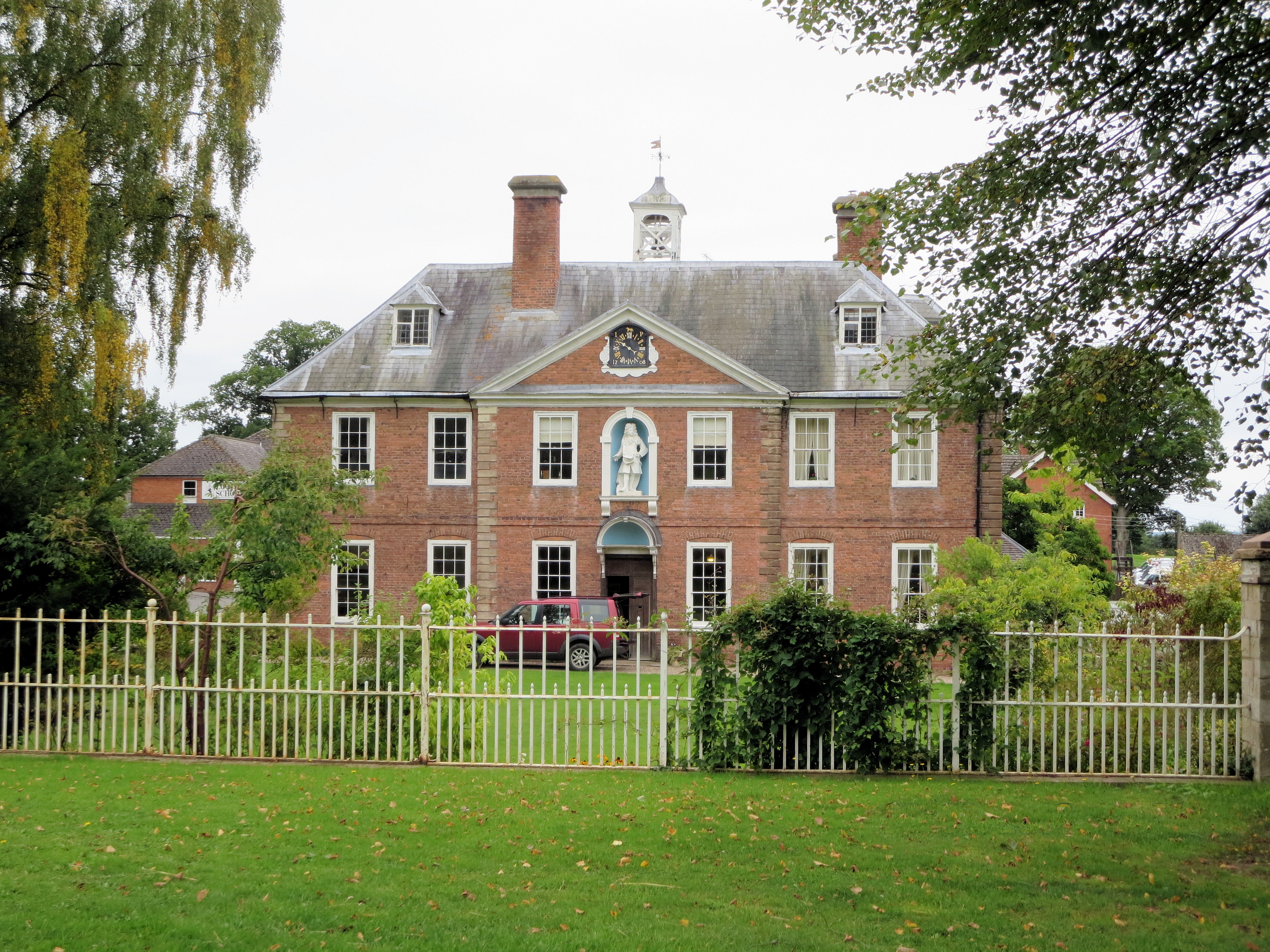
The north front of Queen Anne House showing the statue of the founder, John Pierrepont.

== History ==
The 'free school in Lucton' was founded by John Pierrepont by indenture dated 7 December 1708. Pierrepont had made his fortune as a vintner in London and, being unmarried, elected to use his fortune in good works. He restored the chapel in Lucton village and provided a stipend for a minister. In his will, he also provided bequests to The Royal Hospital of St Bartholomew (of which he was a governor) and Mile End Hospital. His generosity is recorded on a funeral cartouche, originally mounted in the chapel in Lucton but now in the dining hall of the school. By Act of Parliament in 1708, Pierrepont established a free school in Lucton, based on the tithes due him from estates and manors such as those in Yarpole, Bircher, Luston and Eyton. The school was founded as a Bluecoat school (although the governors provided for pupils at Lucton the cheaper alternative of brown coats) and the building was erected on land purchased from Pierrepont’s friend, Sir Herbert Croft of nearby Croft Castle. Pierrepont himself set out detailed rules for the foundation and running of the School, aided by his parish priest at St. Botolph, Aldgate, Rev'd Dr White Kennett (later 16th Bishop of Peterborough.) His school was, he decided, to provide a sound Anglican education, as well as studies in Greek, Latin, reading, writing and arithmetic. The endowment was to provide free education to 50 boys from poorer families, whilst 30 boys from wealthier families would pay up to 10/- per annum.

Since 1989, the school has been managed by the Lucton Pierrepont School Educational Trust.

== Campus ==
The school is housed in a listed Queen Anne building, and a range of Victorian and modern buildings set in about 22 hectares (54 acres) of Herefordshire countryside. It comprises a nursery with about 60 infants (aged 6 months to 4 years), a preparatory school with 72 pupils (aged 5 to 10 years), a middle school with 72 pupils (aged 10–13 years), a senior school of 92 pupils (aged 13–16 years) and a sixth form of 56 pupils (aged 16–19 years).

Queen Anne House is the original school house, with quarters for the headteacher, and two large school rooms, now the Queen Anne Dining Room and the assembly hall. The top storey, originally long room style dormitories, has been converted to a sixth form centre, a library and an ICT suite. The building also contains classrooms, the Senior Common Room, offices and sports changing rooms.

The Victorian building houses science laboratories, ICT room, classrooms and the Upper Hall, an auditorium with stage, lighting box and green room. The Hereford Block is a prefab housing the middle school, and a DT classroom and workshop. Croft House is home to the school's senior boarders, with younger boarders living in School Cottage. The former Hall Design School has been converted to house the preparatory and nursery schools.

Sporting facilities include an indoor swimming pool (opened by British Paralympian swimmers Sascha Kindred and Nyree Lewis, and formally named The Wessex Pool by HRH Prince Edward, Earl of Wessex as part of the school's tercentenary celebrations in 2008) and a large playing field, named The Holland after its donor. The conversion of the former covered playground known as The Acky into an up-to-date, weather-proofed sports hall was completed in the summer of 2013.

In 2009, the school developed a new equestrian centre and, in 2015, Lucton purchased an extra 2.2 hectares (5.4 acres) to increase the playing field provision.

== Curriculum ==
Class sizes are small with an average of 14 pupils per class and the syllabus broadly follows the English National Curriculum. In addition to the core curriculum (English language and literature, maths, biology, chemistry and physics) subjects taught include art, business studies, dance, design technology (DT), drama, environmental science, economics, EFL/EAL, ethics, French, geography, German, history, information and communication technology (ICT), Latin, Mandarin, music, psychology, philosophy, Spanish, textiles and theatre studies. All pupils pursue a course of RS to Year 9 and a course in philosophy and ethics to GCSE, with the option to continue that course to 'A' level. Pupils also study PSE up to Year 11, with COPE (Certificate of Personal Effectiveness) available to pupils in the Sixth Form. Pupils are prepared for qualifications at GCSE, IGCSE and 'A' level.

== Extra curricular activities ==
=== Sport ===
The main boys' sports are Rugby football in the autumn term, Association football in the spring and cricket in the summer; the main girls' sports are netball in the autumn and spring terms, and rounders in the summer. Other sports offered include athletics, cross country running, hockey, basketball, badminton, swimming, tennis and the recently introduced lacrosse. The school has promoted aquathlon—a triathlon event without the cycling component—specifically in an open event attended by local primary schools. Primary schools from across the county come together each year to compete for the Lucton School Tercentenary Shield, a cross-country competition for children aged between 7 and 11.

Riding lessons are offered for all age groups and for those outside the school, on both the pupils' own mounts and on a community of resident ponies. The centre features an all-weather arena and stabling for 14 horses.

=== CCF ===
The school has a Combined Cadet Force (CCF) which was first formed by Headmaster Vernon Pitt in 1917 and is attached to The Rifles Regiment. The Lucton School CCF currently holds the title of the National CCF First Aid Competition winners. Prep school pupils have the benefit of Forest Schools, conducted within the school grounds.

=== Drama and music ===
Each section of the school offers a major dramatic production each year. Recently, the senior school has produced "Daisy Pulls It Off", "Teechers" and "Hi-de-Hi!"; the middle school has offered "Toad of Toad Hall", "The Phantom Tollbooth" and "Wyrd Sisters"; prep school productions have included "Cinderella and Rockerfella" and "A Midsummer Night's Dream", whilst the nursery produces a traditional nativity play each year.

All pupils in years 5 and 6 have free violin or cello lessons, and individual tuition is available on a full range of other instruments, including the harp, guitar, voice and percussion. There is a school orchestra, as well as various instrumental groups and three choirs which perform in concert at the school as well as singing evensong in cathedrals and greater churches. Pupils may study for LAMDA qualifications in "Speech and Drama", and for music qualifications through the ABRSM

== Allegations of and convictions for child abuse ==
In 2018 ITV’s Exposure documentary featured a former pupil who recalled how in 1975, when he was 13, a housemaster, David Panter, had begun abusing him. He had seen other boys abused. The boy had repeatedly reported the abuse to headmaster Keith Vivian, who at first did nothing, but eventually Panter was removed. His teaching career continued in the state sector. Exposure tracked down the headmaster who employed him at his next school – telling the programme he would have received a reference from Lucton School. In 2016, Panter was jailed for nine years for indecent assault and gross indecency against seven Lucton pupils.

To avoid a contested trial, he was only convicted for the crimes he admitted. He pleaded not guilty to the allegations made by the pupil appearing on the programme.

== Notable alumni ==
- William Procter (1801–1884): Industrialist; Co-Founder of the Procter & Gamble Company.
- Eustace Jotham (1883–1915): Soldier, awarded the VC
- Sir Charles Irving (1924-1995): Conservative MP
- Thane Bettany (1929-2015): Actor and former dancer; father of actor Paul Bettany
- Jan Pieńkowski (1936-2022): Illustrator, writer and designer.

== See also ==
Luctonians Cricket Club Ground Luctonians
