= John Scarlett Davis =

English painter (1804–1845)

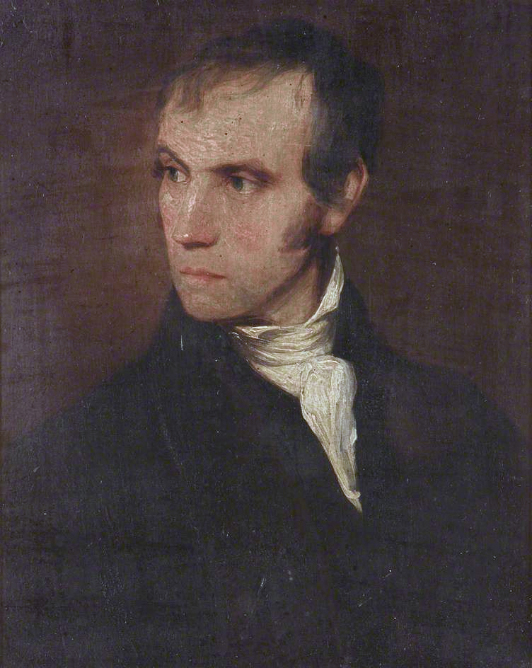
- Self portrait, c. 1841
- Born: 1 September 1804; 3, High Street, Leominster, England
- Died: 29 September 1845 (aged 41); 11, Bedford Street, Bedford Square, London, England
- Occupation: painter
- Known for: Landscape, portrait and architectural paintings

John Scarlett Davis (1 September 1804 – 29 September 1845), or Davies, was an English landscape, portrait and architectural painter, and lithographer.

== Life and work ==
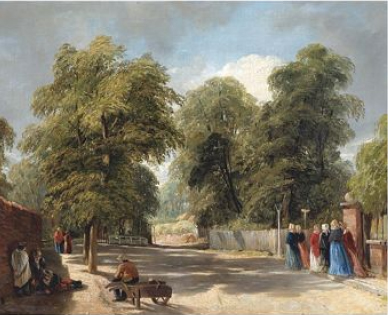
The Spaniards - Hampstead Heath, c. 1844 possibly his last work

Davis was born in Leominster (the building, 2 High Street, survives), the second of five children of James Davis, a silversmith and watchmaker. Scarlett was his mother's maiden name; she was a distant relation of James Scarlett, 1st Baron Abinger. At the age of eleven, Davis won an award from the local society for the encouragement of the arts. He studied at the Royal Academy Schools in London, and began exhibiting his works at the annual Royal Academy shows in 1825 (with the painting "My Den"). He last exhibited in London in 1844. He was influenced by the work of his contemporary, Richard Parkes Bonington.

Davis painted portraits, landscapes, and church interiors, and developed a distinctive speciality in painting the interiors of art galleries. His picture The Interior of the British Institution Gallery (1829) records a collection of Old Masters. He lithographed and published twelve heads from studies by Rubens, and in 1832 some views of Bolton Abbey, drawn from nature on stone. His watercolor of the collection of Benjamin Godfrey Windus (1835) shows the Turner pictures on the walls. (John Ruskin studied those Turners while writing his Modern Painters.) Davis painted the interiors of the Louvre as well. Between 1842 and 1845 he was commissioned to draw copies of the paintings in the collections of the British royal palaces.

Davis painted scenes on the Continent during his travels there. In 1831 he had a commission from Lord Farnborough to paint an interior of the Vatican and of the Escorial. He was in Florence in 1834, where he painted the interior of the Uffizi Gallery, and in Amsterdam in 1841 (sending the picture "Jack after a successful cruise, visiting his old comrades at Greenwich").

He died of pulmonary tuberculosis on 29 September 1845, at his London home, 11, Bedford Street, in Bedford Square and was buried at All Souls, Kensal Green. He was 41 years old.

He is commemorated by a blue plaque, erected in September 2002, on his birthplace in Leominster. His works are in a number of public and private collections, with several in each of the National Museum Cardiff, the National Portrait Gallery, Tate Britain, Hereford Museum and Art Gallery, Leominster Museum, the Metropolitan Museum of Art, and the Yale Center for British Art. A major exhibition of his work was held at Hereford in 1937. A number of his letters are held by Herefordshire Libraries and Information Service.
