= Eustace Jotham =

Recipient of the Victoria Cross

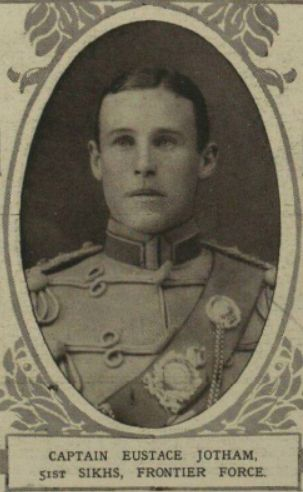
- Jotham c. 1913
- Born: 28 November 1883; Kidderminster, Worcestershire
- Died: 7 January 1915 (aged 31); Tochi Valley, North West Frontier, British India
- Burial place: Miranshah Cemetery, North Waziristan
- Military career
- Allegiance: United Kingdom
- Branch: British Indian Army
- Service years: 1903–1915
- Rank: Captain
- Units: North Staffordshire Regiment; 102nd Prince of Wales's Own Grenadiers; 51st Sikhs
- Conflicts: World War I †
- Awards: Victoria Cross

Eustace Jotham VC (28 November 1883 – 7 January 1915) was an English recipient of the Victoria Cross, the highest and most prestigious award for gallantry in the face of the enemy that can be awarded to British and Commonwealth forces.

== Early life and career ==
Born in Kidderminster 28 November 1883, Jotham attended Lucton School in Herefordshire for five years and at the age of 16, in 1899, he transferred to Bromsgrove School. In 1901, at the age of 18, he left to attend the Royal Military College, Sandhurst. He was commissioned into the Prince of Wales's (North Staffordshire) Regiment as a second lieutenant on 22 April 1903 and joined the 2nd Battalion of his regiment, embarking for a tour of duty in India.

In 1903 Jotham sailed to India with the North Staffords and served with them until 1905. Under the Indian Army regulations for admission paragraph 13 British army officers could transfer to the Indian army. Jotham transferred to the Indian Army on 23 June 1905 (backdated to his commissioning date in 1903), and promoted to lieutenant in the 102nd Prince of Wales's Own Grenadiers on 22 July 1905. In October 1906 he transferred to the 51st Sikhs and is listed in the records as a 'double company officer'. He was promoted captain on 22 April 1912.

In 1913 he returned to England for what would be his last period of home leave. Just before he returned to India he was a passenger on a train involved in the accident at Ais Gill and participated in rescue operations. He appeared as a witness at the inquiry held immediately after the accident.

On his return to India he was attached to the North Waziristan Militia during 1914–1915 and it was during this attachment on operations in the Tochi Valley area of the North West Frontier that he was killed in action on 7 January 1915. His bravery during these operations earned him a posthumous Victoria Cross.

== Citation ==
For most conspicuous bravery on 7th January, 1915, at Spina Khaisora (Tochi Valley). During operations against the Khostwal tribesmen, Captain Jotham, who was commanding a party of about a dozen of the North Waziristan Militia, was attacked in a nullah and almost surrounded by an overwhelming force of some 1,500 tribesmen. He gave the order to retire, and could have himself escaped, but most gallantly sacrificed his own life by attempting to effect the rescue of one of his men who had lost his horse.

— The London Gazette, 23 July 1915

== Burial and memorials ==
He was buried in the Miranshah Cemetery, North Waziristan, and is commemorated on the Delhi Memorial (India Gate).

On 7 January 2015, the 100th anniversary of his death, a memorial paving stone to Jotham was unveiled at St Mary's and All Saints Church in his home town of Kidderminster. Jotham's VC is held at Bromsgrove School.

== Bibliography ==
- Buzzell, Nora, ed. (1997). The Register of the Victoria Cross. Cheltenham, Gloucestershire: This England Alma House. ISBN 0-906324-27-0.
- Gliddon, Gerald (2005). The Sideshows. VCs of the First World War. Gloucestershire, England: Sutton Publishing. ISBN 978-0-7509-2084-1.
