= Croft, Herefordshire =

Village in Herefordshire, England

Coordinates: 52.2847°N 2.8054°W

Croft
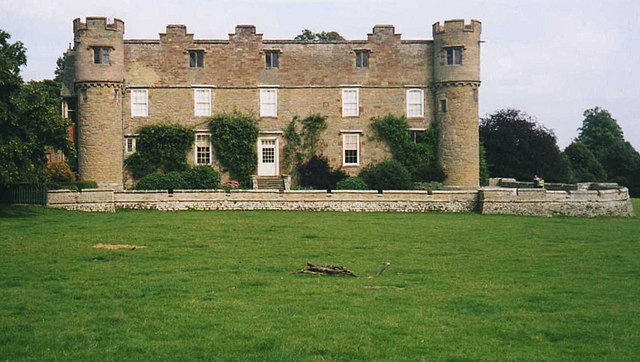
- Croft Castle

- Location within Herefordshire
- Civil parish: Croft and Yarpole
- Unitary authority: County of Herefordshire
- Ceremonial county: Herefordshire
- Region: West Midlands
- Country: England
- Sovereign state: United Kingdom

Croft is a village and former civil parish, now in the parish of Croft and Yarpole, in north Herefordshire, England. In 1961 the parish had a population of 25. On 1 April 1987 the parish was abolished and merged with Yarpole to form "Croft & Yarpole".

Croft Castle was built in the 14th century and was the seat of the Croft family.
