= Croft Ambrey =

Iron Age hillfort

Coordinates: 52.295°N 2.815°W

- Aymestrey; Near Leominster in UK
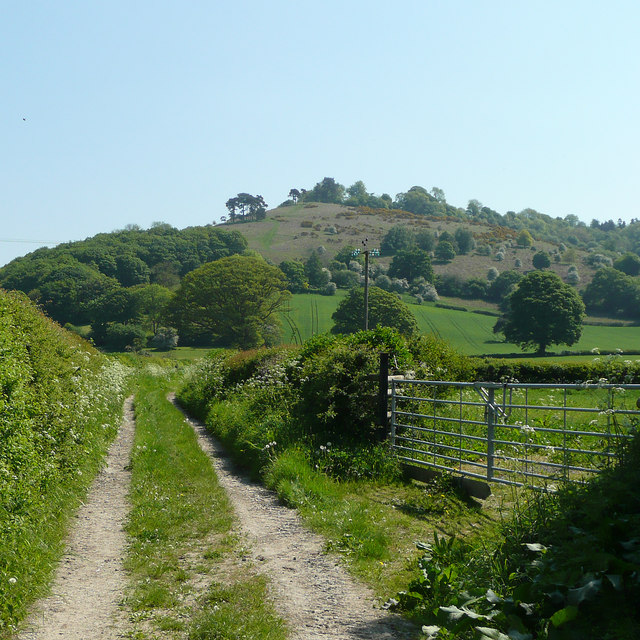
- Croft Ambrey at the north

Location
- Area: 32 acres

Croft Ambrey is an Iron Age hill fort in Herefordshire, England.

== Location ==
Croft Ambrey, on Yatton Hill, is in the civil parish of Aymestrey, 6 miles (10 km) north from Leominster, 3.5 miles (6 km) south-east from the South Shropshire border, and approximately 7 miles (11 km) east from the Wales border. The fort is on high ground beyond and adjoining the north-east boundary of National Trust Croft Castle parkland. The nearest settlements are the villages of Yarpole, Aymestrey and Yatton, and the hamlet of Mortimer's Cross. The Mortimer Trail waymarked long-distance footpath passes the site.

== Description ==
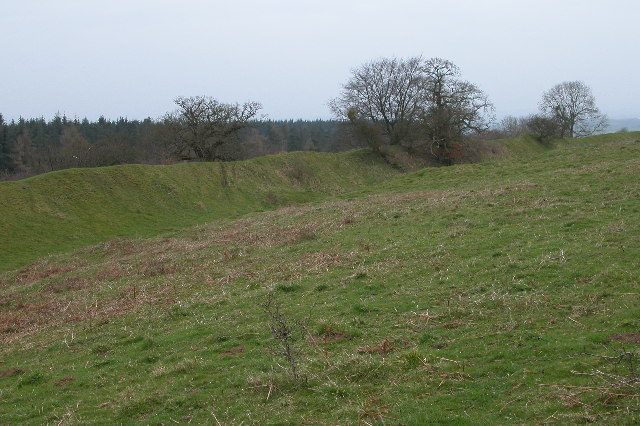
Rampart at Croft Ambrey

The monument includes a small multivallate hillfort with an annexe containing a Romano-Celtic temple and a medieval warren of up to five pillow mounds on the summit of a prominent steeply sloping spur overlooking Yatton Marsh and the valley of a tributary to Allcock's Brook. The hillfort survives as a roughly triangular enclosure defined to the north by two scarps with a buried ditch: to the west by three rampart banks and a larger internal ditch and to the south by three rampart banks with two medial ditches and a wide internal ditch which may have been used to store water. There were two complex entrances which through time had 20 successive gateposts and were further enhanced with guardrooms, corridors and bridges of which the south western was the principal entrance and the north eastern was complex and inturned. The enclosure originally covered approximately 2.2ha, but this increased through time to 3.6ha and eventually a southern rectangular annexe was added. This is defined by two slighter concentric banks.

== Excavations ==
The hillfort was excavated between 1960 and 1966 and was found to have been in use from the 6th century BC up to AD 48. It contained closely set rectangular buildings which had been rebuilt up to six times. The population of the hillfort was estimated at 500-900 individuals. Finds included metalwork such as iron tools, weapons, sickles, blades, nails and a spade, shale and glass objects, bone and antler artefacts, spindle whorls, loom and thatch weights, saddle querns and rotary querns, hammer stones and Iron Age pottery.

There are some notable parallels with the hillfort at Wapley Hill, which also was used for rabbit farming.
