= Mortimer Forest =

Forest in England

Coordinates: 52.36°N 2.76°W

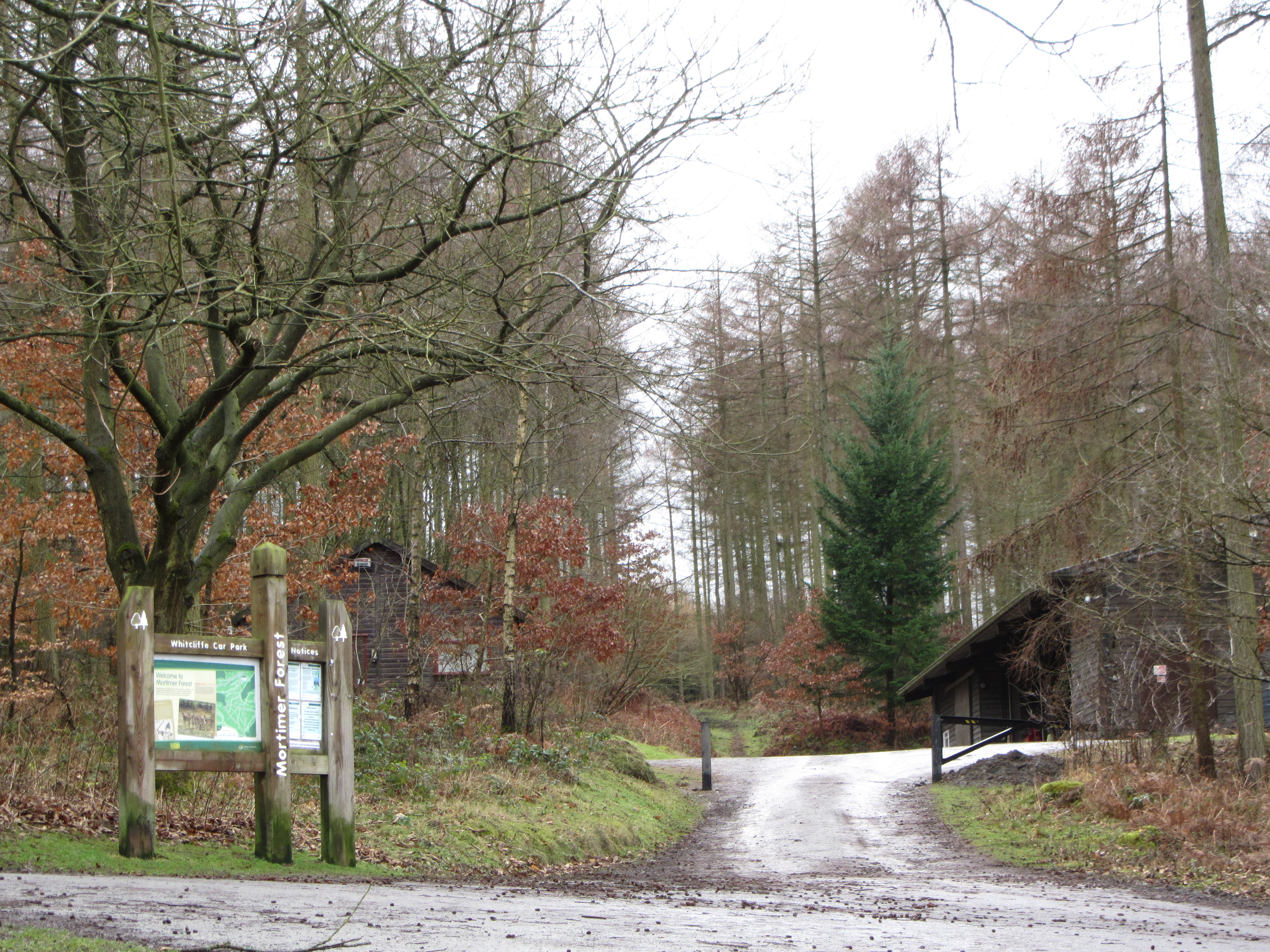
Mortimer Forest information board in 2012

Mortimer Forest is a forest on the Shropshire/Herefordshire border in England, near the town of Ludlow. It covers hilly terrain, including the marilyn of High Vinnalls, rising to 375 metres (1,230 ft).

== History ==
Mortimer Forest was an ancient hunting forest, similar to areas including Bircher Common. According to Forestry England, it is a remnant of the ancient Saxon hunting forests of Mocktree, Deerfold and Bringewood. Remains of this 'ancient battleground' include a castle mound that was owned by powerful Marcher lords, who had considerable fortified bases at Wigmore and Ludlow. The name of the forest derives from the Mortimers, who were Marcher lords.

Natural history includes very old limestones and shales laid down by the sea some 400 million years ago.

=== Location ===
Mortimer Forest is located on the county boundary of Shropshire and Herefordshire, in the West Midlands region of England. The OS positioning is: SO480730, it is near the town of Ludlow, which is on the A49 road.

=== Climate ===
Mortimer Forest has typical forest climate, with lower-than-average light levels and a slightly cooler temperature. It is also in a hilly part of England, meaning it has a damp climate.

=== Geology ===
The limestones and shales of Mortimer Forest are around 400 million years old, making them round the Silurian/Ordivician age. Fossils are common in the Mortimer Forest, especially corals, trilobites and shells. This indicates that at one time the area of Mortimer Forest was underwater.

Multiple patches of Mortimer Forest were together designated as a Site of Special Scientific Interest (SSSI) in 1992. This designation is because of the fossils found in the area. Most of the land designated as Mortimer Forest SSSI is owned by the Forestry Commission.

== Tourism ==
Mortimer Forest is owned by Forestry England, which has done a number of things to facilitate tourists, including a website, signage, picnic tables, car parks, and laying out walking tracks for different fitness abilities.

National Cycle Network route 44 passes through, en route between Ludlow and Leominster. Also passing through the area is the Mortimer Trail, a long-distance footpath.
