= St Leonard's Church, Yarpole =

Church in Herefordshire, England

Church of St Leonard, Yarpole
- St Leonard's with the detached tower to the left

- Location in Herefordshire
- 52.2794°N 2.7785°W
- Location: Yarpole, Herefordshire
- Country: England
- Denomination: Church of England
- Website: Yarpole Parish website

History
- Status: parish church
- Dedication: St Leonard

Architecture
- Functional status: Active
- Heritage designation: Grade II* listed
- Designated: 11 June 1959

Specifications
- Materials: Old Red Sandstone

Administration
- Province: Canterbury
- Diocese: Diocese of Hereford
- Parish: Yarpole

Clergy
- Vicar: Rev. Matthew Burns

The Church of St Leonard, Yarpole, Herefordshire, England, is an active parish church in the Diocese of Hereford. The church is dedicated to St Leonard. It is a Grade II* listed building. Its tower stands separate from the church and has its own Grade I listing. St Leonard's contains a full-time community shop, a post office, and a café, reputedly the first such enterprise to operate from within a Church of England parish church.

== History ==
The origins of the church are of the 14th century. Alan Brooks, in his 2012 Herefordshire volume in the Pevsner Buildings of England series, notes that the free-standing tower is earlier, tree-ring dating gives the years 1195–6. The church stands in the centre of the village of Yarpole. It is dedicated to St Leonard. The church underwent two Victorian restorations, in 1852–3 by James Cranston and in 1863–4 by Sir George Gilbert Scott.

St Leonard's remains an active parish church, in the Western Parishes grouping of the Leominster Team Ministry. A further renovation in 2009, under the direction of the architect Robert Chitham, saw a "drastic" re-ordering of the western end of the church, in order to incorporate a community shop, post office and café, reputedly the first such enterprise to operate from within a Church of England parish church. In their handbook on church reordering, Nigel Walter and Andrew Mottram describe the establishment of the shop and associated works as "a remarkable community-inspired achievement".

== Architecture and description ==
The church comprises a nave, a chancel, a north aisle added by Gilbert Scott in his mid-Victorian restoration, and a south porch. The building material is local Old Red Sandstone with ashlar decoration. The interior contains a "spectacular" collection of stained glass, from the 19th, 20th and 21st centuries. (Note: Stained glass from the 19th century includes work by William Wailes, from the 20th by James Hall & Sons, and from the 21st by Nicola Hopwood.)

=== Belfry ===
The belfry tower stands detached from the church, about 15m to the south. Tree-ring dating indicates that the four timbers which form the roof posts were felled between 1195 and 1196, making it the oldest of the detached towers in Herefordshire. The belfry underwent complete reconstruction in around 1910. It is square with a timber pyramid cupola. (Note: The tower has similarities to that at St Mary's Church, Pembridge in the same county. That tower was the subject of a detailed study by Andrew Boucher and Richard Morriss, published in the journal Vernacular Architecture in 2011. In their study Boucher and Morriss discuss the likely rationale for detached church towers, a type relatively common in Herefordshire, and suggest that the traditional explanation, of the detached tower as a defensive structure, is implausible, given that many, including that at Pembridge, were originally constructed with openings at the ground floor level.) The tower measures 5 m (16.5 ft) at the base and stands some 9 m (30 ft) high.

== Listing designations ==
The church is listed at Grade II* and the tower holds a Grade I listing.

== Gallery ==
Church and churchyard

The interior

The detached tower

Internal view of the tower roof

== Sources ==
- Baillie-Hislop, Malcom James (2016). Castle Builders: Approaches to Castle Design and Construction in the Middle Ages. Barnsley, England: Pen and Sword Books. ISBN 978-1-473-883970.
- Boucher, Andrew R; Morriss, Richard K. (2011). "The Bell Tower of St Mary's Church, Pembridge, Herefordshire". Vernacular Architecture. 42. Taylor & Francis: 22–35. doi:10.1179/174962911X13159065475428.
- Brooks, Alan; Pevsner, Nikolaus (2012). Herefordshire. The Buildings of England. New Haven, US and London: Yale University Press. ISBN 978-0-300-12575-7.
- Walter, Nigel; Mottram, Andrew (2015). Buildings for Mission. London: Canterbury Press. ISBN 978-1-848-257603.
