= Bicton, Herefordshire =

Hamlet in Herefordshire, England

Coordinates: 52.271°N 2.780°W

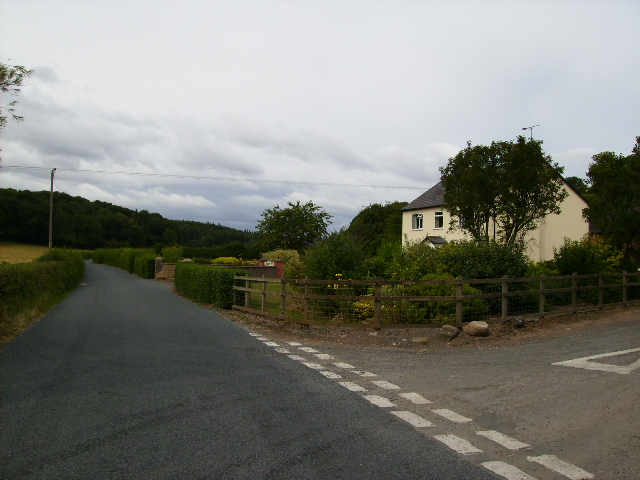
Bicton crossroads

Bicton is a hamlet in the Croft and Yarpole parish in Herefordshire, England. It is on a crossroads south of Yarpole and north-east of Kingsland.
