= Lucton =

Village in Herefordshire, England

Coordinates: 52.2721°N 2.8264°W

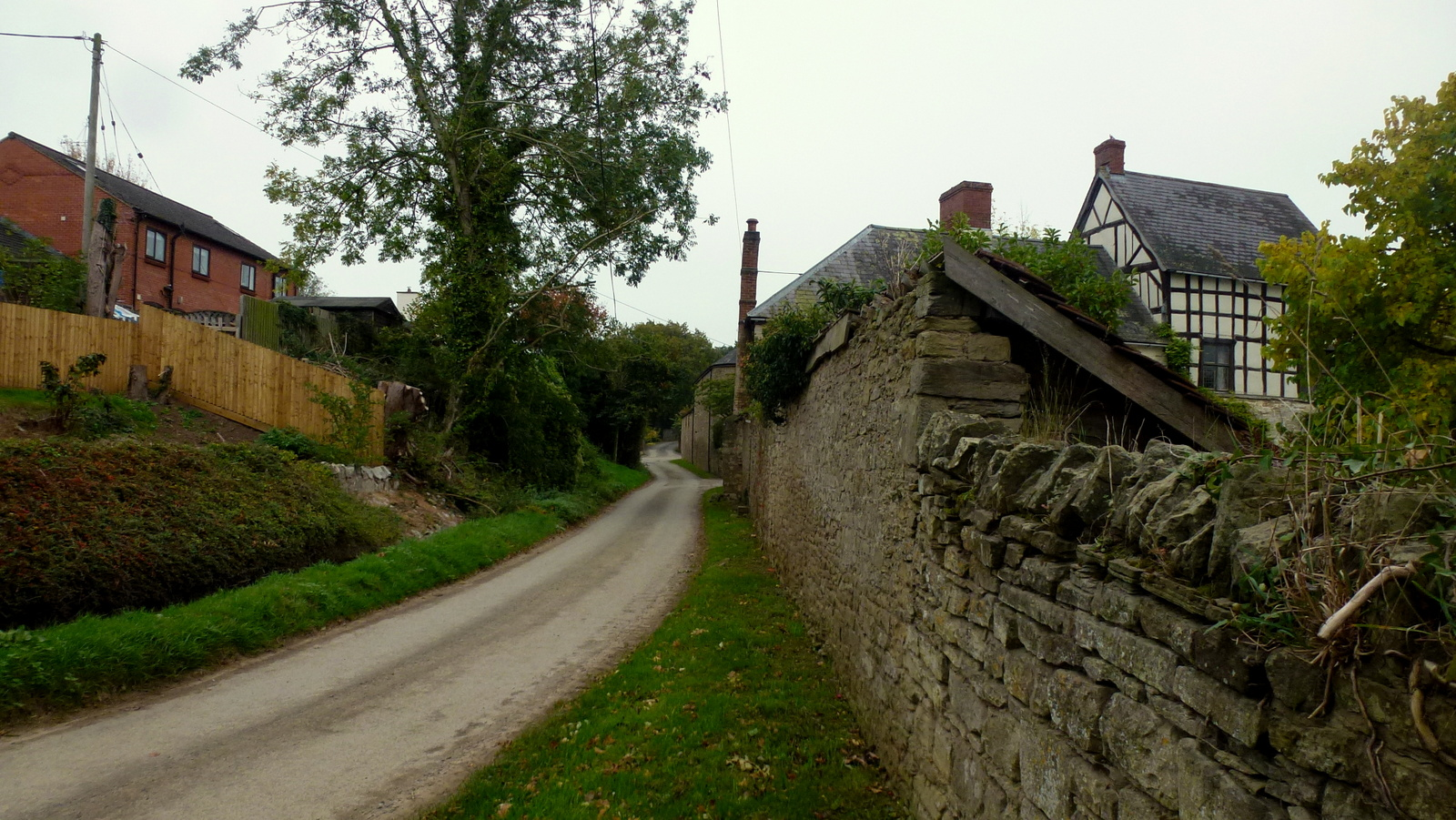
- Lucton village

- Location within Herefordshire
- Population: 235 (2011)
- Unitary authority: Herefordshire
- Shire county: Herefordshire
- Region: West Midlands
- Country: England
- Sovereign state: United Kingdom
- Post town: Leominster
- Postcode district: HR6
- Police: West Mercia
- Fire: Hereford and Worcester
- Ambulance: West Midlands
- UK Parliament: North Herefordshire

Lucton is a village near the town of Leominster in the county of Herefordshire, England. It is best known for being the location of Lucton School, an independent, mixed-gender day and boarding school.
