= Leominster Museum =

Museum in Herefordshire, England

- Former name: Leominster Folk Museum
- Established: 1972
- Location: Leominster, Herefordshire, England
- Coordinates: 52.2259203°N 2.7375494°W
- Website: leominstermuseum.org.uk

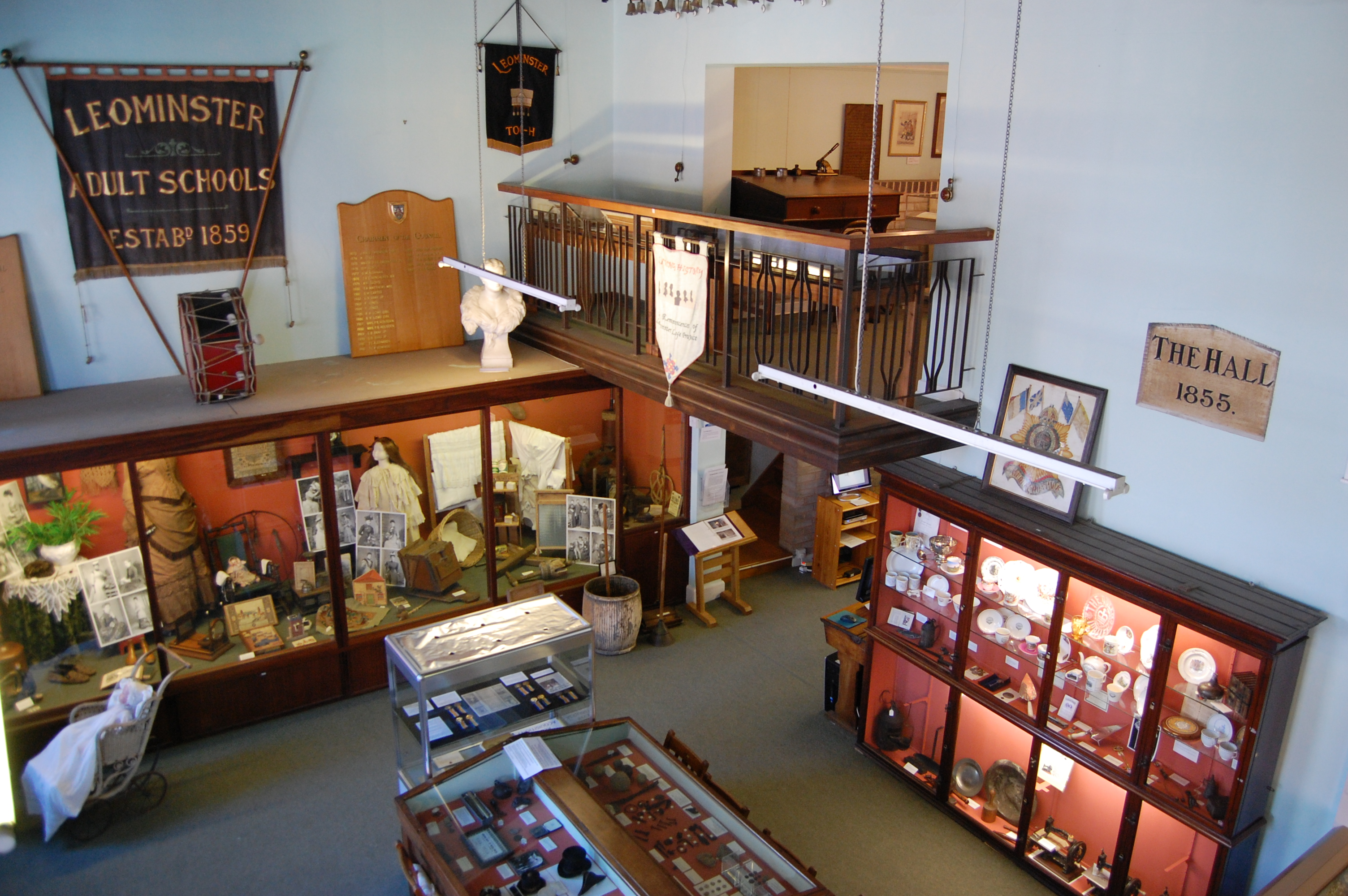
Interior of the museum, seen from the first-floor balcony

Leominster Museum, formerly known as Leominster Folk Museum, is an independent, volunteer-run, museum in Leominster, Herefordshire, England.

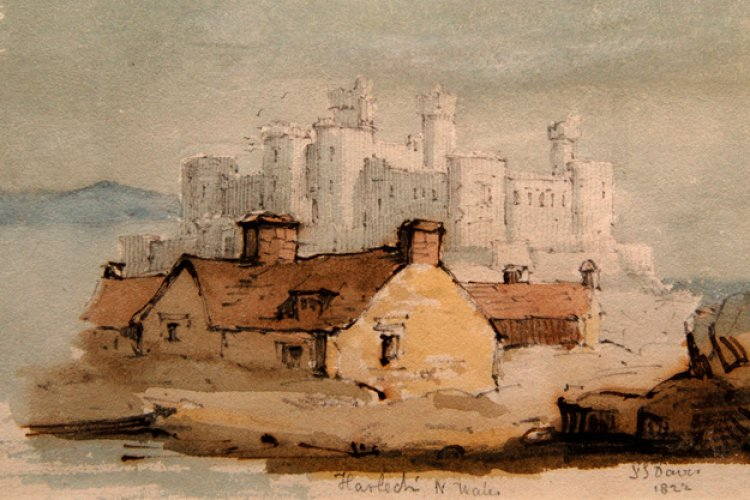
Harlech Castle, by John Scarlett Davis, at the Museum

The museum, which opened in 1972, owns and displays a collection of artefacts relating to the local area, including banknotes and cheques from the Leominster & Herefordshire Bank, early local postage marks, material from the Leominster and Kington Railway, the Bronze Age Aymestrey burial, and a complete cider mill. It also has a number of works by the Leominster-born artist John Scarlett Davis, including an 1828 self-portrait, and a book of 173 sketches, purchased for £11,000 at auction at Christie's in March 1979.

In 2014 the museum obtained an £8,900 Heritage Lottery Fund grant. for a project called "Rifles and Spades", which commemorated the local effects of World War I. The project, which finished in April 2015, comprised three Open Days at the museum, three public talks, a commemorative event at Leominster Priory attended by 240 people, an exhibition called 'Our Story' which was in Leominster Library for two months before touring various village and school locations, and finally a linked set of education packs that are available to schools.

In addition to its permanent displays the museum aims to stage a different temporary exhibition each season. In 2015 there were in fact two: one on the History of Morris Dancing and Mumming in Leominster, entitled 'Here be Dragons!', and 'An Unlikely Champion - A History of Bill Bengry and Bengry Motors'.

The museum building, on Etnam Street, was originally built in 1855 as a mission hall for workers constructing the local railways.
