= Mortimer Trail =

30-mile footpath in the western England

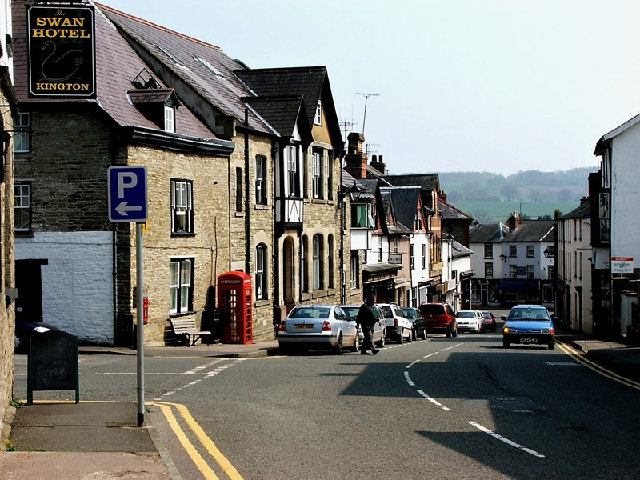
- The western trail head is at Kington, Herefordshire
- Length: 30 miles (48 km)
- Location: Welsh Marches, England
- Trailheads: Ludlow; 52.368°N 2.717°W; Kington; 52.205°N 3.036°W
- Use: Hiking
- Season: All year

The Mortimer Trail is a waymarked long-distance footpath and recreational walk in the counties of Shropshire and Herefordshire in England.

== The route ==
The route is named after the Mortimer family of ruling Marcher Lords, often titled Earl of March, whose rise through successive generations from Norman times through the medieval period helped to shape the history and geography of this area of the Welsh Marches.

The route runs between Ludlow Castle, the former headquarters of the Council of the Marches and a seat of Mortimer power, and Kington, Herefordshire, in the quiet west of the county near the Welsh border.

The 30-mile (48 km) route crosses the River Teme and enters Mortimer Forest, an area of forested ridges. It passes Croft Castle and the Iron Age hill fort Croft Ambrey (not far from Wigmore and the initial seat of Mortimer power), and then passes through quiet Aymestrey. Near Aymestrey it passes through Puckhouse Wood, reputedly haunted by pucks or wood sprites. According to lore, a traveller lost in the wood at night paid a stipend for a bell to be tolled to rescue travellers from the Puck's clutches.

The path crosses the River Lugg and the River Arrow and ends in Kington.

Five loop walks depart from and return to the main waymarked trail at various points along the route, enabling investigation of surrounding attractions, villages and features. The Mortimer Trail Official Route Guide details these.
