= Aymestrey =

Village in Herefordshire, England

Coordinates: 52°17′N 2°50′W

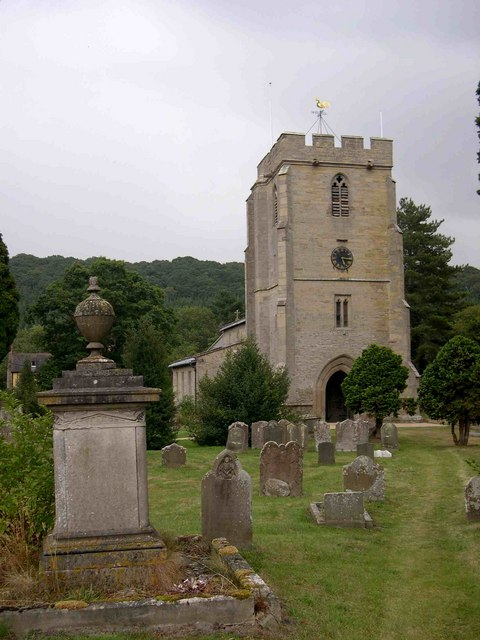
- St John the Baptist and St Alkmund's Church, Aymestrey

- Location within Herefordshire
- Population: 351 (2011 Census)
- District: Herefordshire
- Shire county: Herefordshire
- Region: West Midlands
- Country: England
- Sovereign state: United Kingdom
- Post town: Leominster
- Postcode district: HR6
- Police: West Mercia
- Fire: Hereford and Worcester
- Ambulance: West Midlands
- UK Parliament: North Herefordshire

Aymestrey ( /ˈeɪmstriː/ AYM-stree) is a village and civil parish in north-west Herefordshire, England. The population of this civil parish, including the hamlet Yatton, at the 2011 Census was 351.

== Location ==
It is located on the A4110 road, about 7 miles north-west of Leominster and 8 miles south-west of the historic market town Ludlow, in south Shropshire. The village is on the River Lugg.

== Amenities and history ==
Aymestrey is home to several homes and cottages, the church dedicated to St John the Baptist and St Alkmund, a village hall and a pub or Inn: The Riverside Inn, situated next to River Lugg just off the main road.

The Mortimer Trail waymarked recreational walk passes through the village.

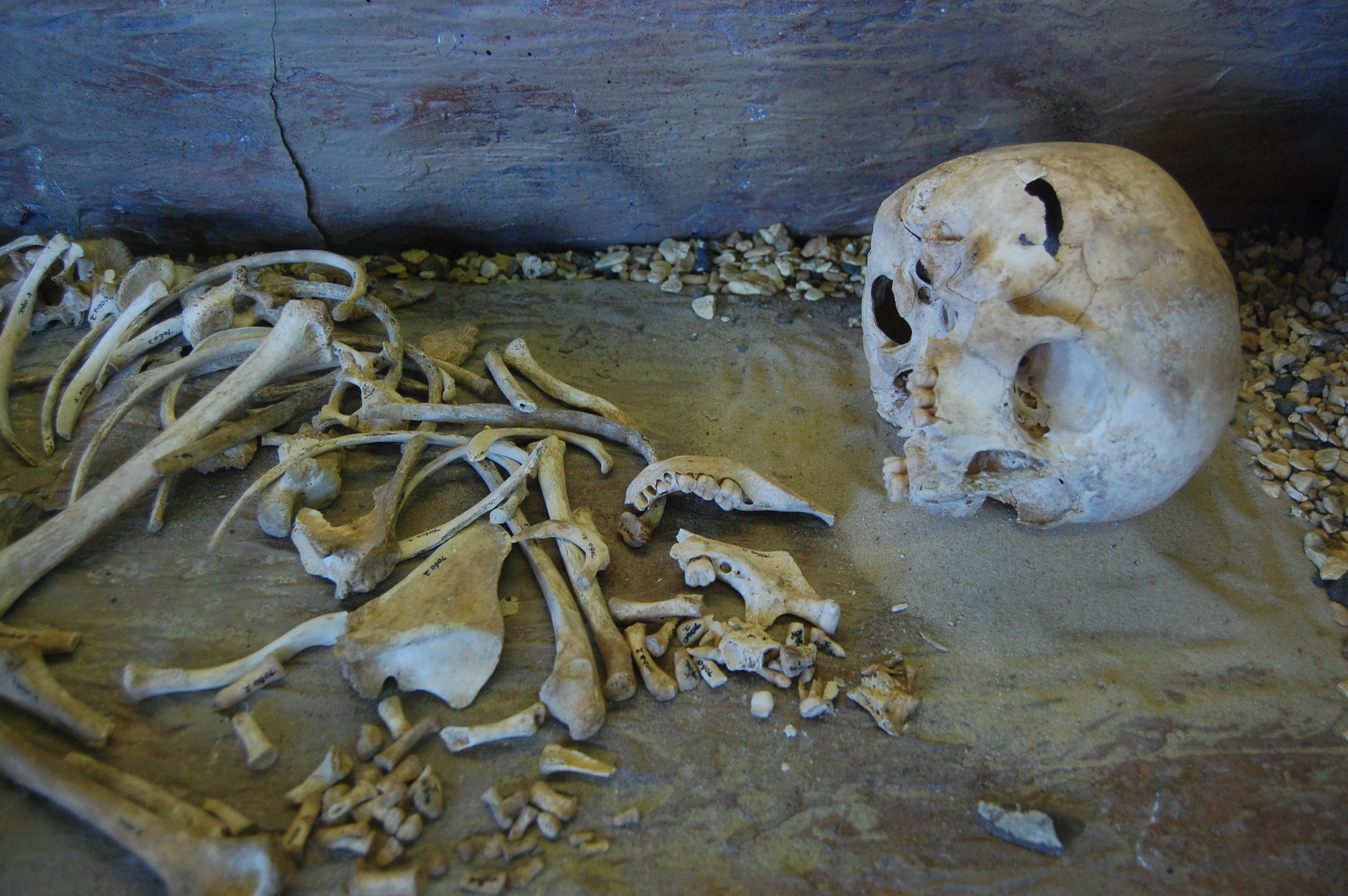
The skull and other bones from the Aymestrey burial, at Leominster Museum

In 1987, the Aymestrey burial, an Early Bronze Age, beaker cist, was discovered during gravel working. It has since been recreated at Leominster Museum.

== In fiction ==
Aymestrey is featured in the supernatural crime novel Foxglove Summer by Ben Aaronovitch, where it is described as being "less a village than a diorama of the last six hundred years of English vernacular architecture stretched along either side of the road."

== Notable people ==
- Joshua Sasse, actor
