= Yarpole =

Village in Herefordshire, England

Coordinates: 52.283°N 2.783°W

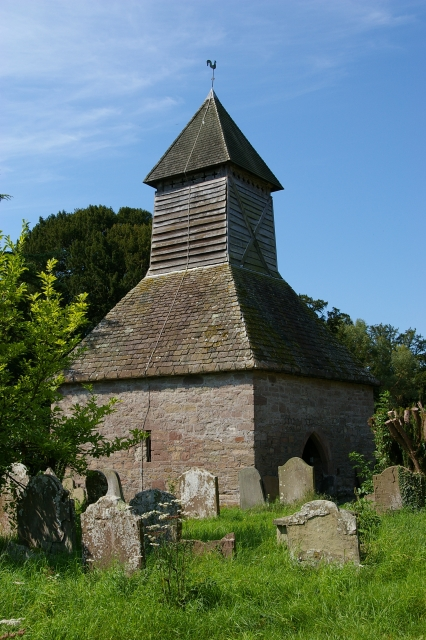
- St Leonard's belltower

- Location within Herefordshire
- OS grid reference: SO4664
- Civil parish: Croft and Yarpole
- Unitary authority: Herefordshire
- Ceremonial county: Herefordshire
- Region: West Midlands
- Country: England
- Sovereign state: United Kingdom
- Post town: Hereford
- Postcode district: HR6
- Dialling code: 01568
- Police: West Mercia
- Fire: Hereford and Worcester
- Ambulance: West Midlands
- UK Parliament: North Herefordshire
- Website: http://www.yarpole.com/

Yarpole is a village and former civil parish, now in the parish of Croft and Yarpole, Herefordshire, England, about 4.5 miles (7 km) north-west of Leominster. The village is near the county boundary with Shropshire and about 7 kilometres (4 mi) south-west of Ludlow. The hamlet of Bicton is to the south, Bircher to the north-east and Croft to the west. In 1961 the parish had a population of 394. On 1 April 1987 the parish was abolished and merged with Croft to form "Croft and Yarpole".

The village has a gastropub, The Bell, and a parish hall.

== Church ==
The parish church of St Leonard's is Grade II* listed. Most of the building dates to the early 14th century, its oldest part being the 13th-century font. The church was restored and extended to designs by George Gilbert Scott in 1864. In 2009 the interior of the church was extensively reordered and a community shop and post office were built at the west end. Yarpole is one of several Herefordshire parishes whose belltower stands separate from the church. The Grade I listed tower dates to the 13th-century, the ground stage built of stone, with the roofs and upper stage timber-framed. It is one of a number of partly or largely timber-framed belltowers in Herefordshire. The dendrochronology dating of its main timbers to 1192 makes it one of the oldest timber-framed structures in England. The writer, painter and lawyer Fred Uhlman is buried in the churchyard.
