= Croft Castle =

Country house estate near Leominster, England

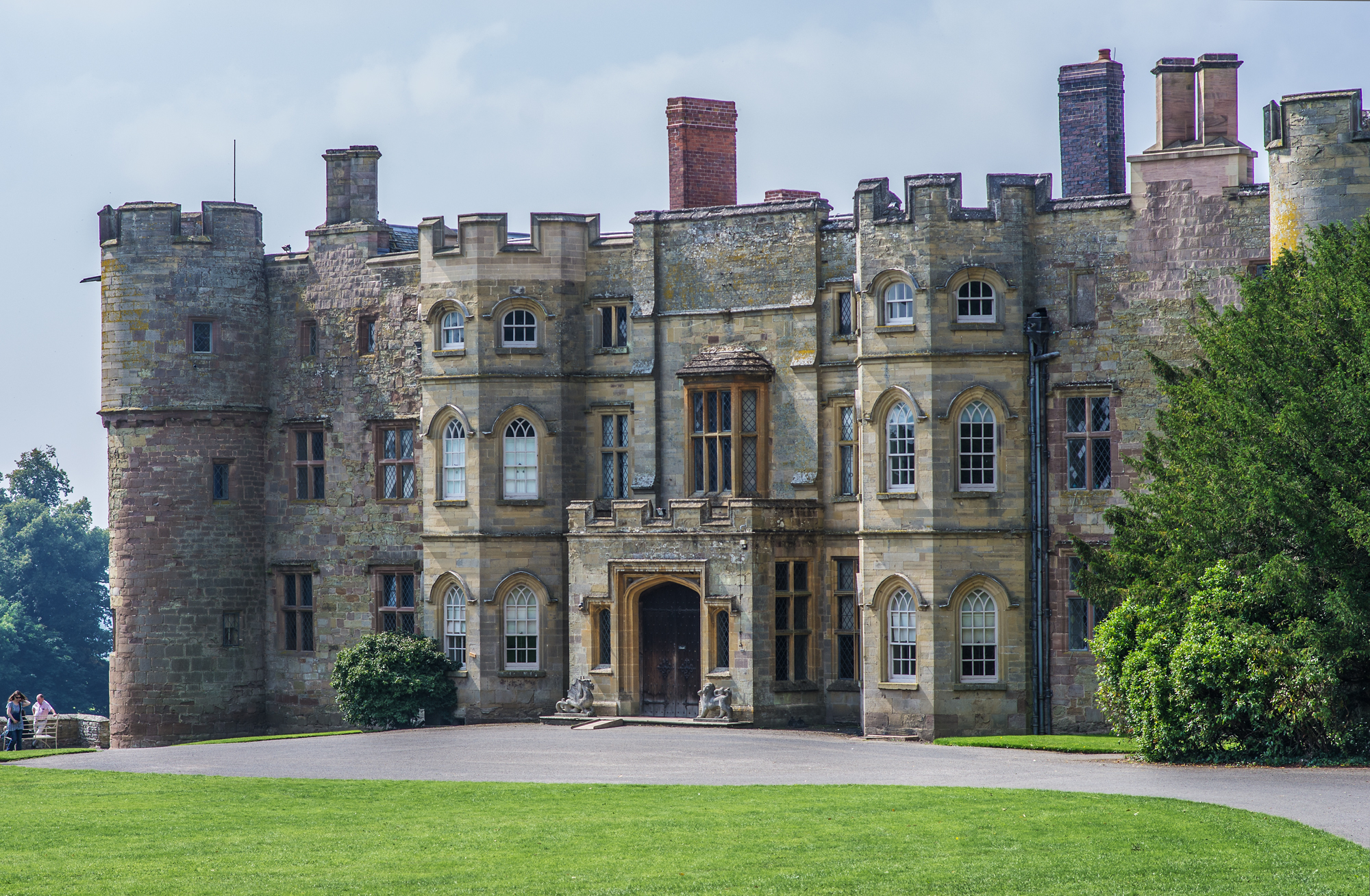
- Croft Castle in 2010

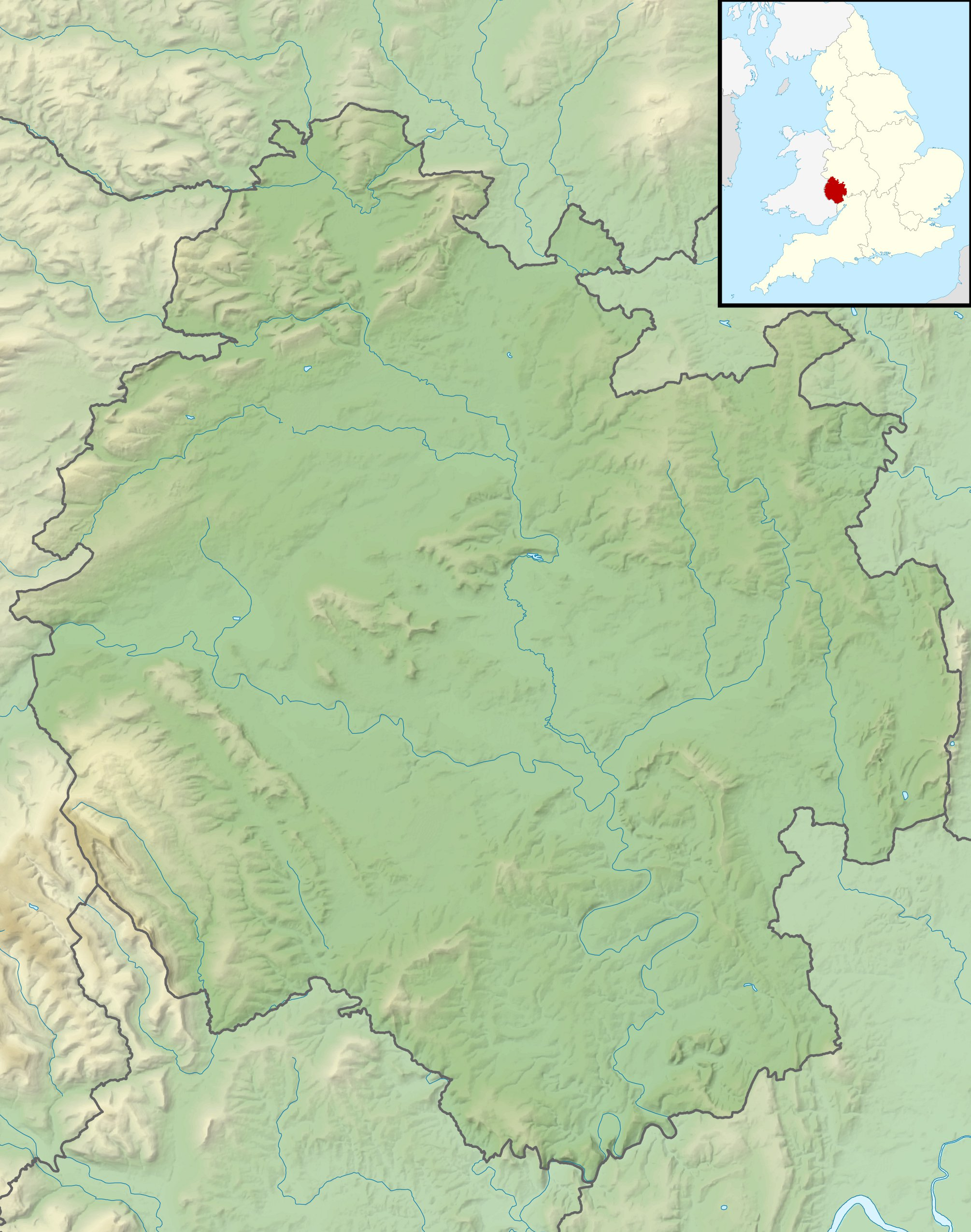
- Location within Herefordshire
- 52.28486°N 2.80916°W
- Type: Country house
- Location: Croft, Herefordshire

History
- Built: 16th-20th centuries with earlier additions

Listed Building – Grade I
- Official name: Croft Castle
- Designated: 8 November 1956
- Reference no.: 1166451

Listed Building – Grade I
- Official name: Church of St Michael
- Designated: 11 June 1959
- Reference no.: 1166506

Listed Building – Grade II
- Official name: Terrace Wall to South and West of Croft Castle
- Designated: 9 December 1986
- Reference no.: 1166490

Listed Building – Grade II
- Official name: Stable block
- Designated: 9 December 1986
- Reference no.: 1082080

National Register of Historic Parks and Gardens
- Official name: Croft Castle Park and Garden
- Designated: 28 February 1986
- Reference no.: 1000878

Croft Castle is a country house in the village of Croft, Herefordshire, England. Owned by the Croft family since 1085, the castle and estate passed out of their hands in the 18th century, before being repurchased by the family in 1923. In 1957 it was bequeathed to the National Trust. The castle is a Grade I listed building, and the estate is separately listed as Grade II*. The adjacent Church of St Michael is listed Grade I.

== History ==
A building has been on the site from c.1085 when the estate was established by the Croft family and from this time been the home of the Croft family and Croft baronets. The Croft family were closely linked to their neighbours the Mortimers of Wigmore and Ludlow. The Battle of Mortimer's Cross took place on Croft land nearby in 1461. It was the home of Sir John de Croft who married Janet, one of Owain Glyndŵr's daughters. In the 15th century, the Croft family adopted the Welsh Wyvern crest, a wounded black dragon, seen as an allusion to their Glyndwr heritage. The first member of the Croft family to have owned the estate was Bernard de Croft, who is mentioned in Domesday Book.

The Croft family suffered financially following the South Sea Bubble and in 1746, sold the estate to Richard Knight (1693–1765). Knight was the eldest son and heir of Richard Knight (1659-1745), of Downton Hall, in the parish of Downton on the Rock in Herefordshire, a wealthy ironmaster who operated the Bringewood Ironworks and founded a large fortune and family dynasty. He married Elizabeth Powell of Stanage Park in Radnorshire by whom he had a sole daughter Elizabeth Knight, who married Thomas Johnes (died 1780) of Llanfair Clydogau, MP for Radnorshire (1777–80). In the 1760s, Johnes remodelled the Castle in the Rococo-Gothic style to the designs of the Shrewsbury architect Thomas Farnolls Pritchard (d.1777), designer of the world's first iron bridge spanning the Severn near Coalbrookdale. Georgian sash windows replaced mullion windows. Pritchard designed the plasterwork ceilings, the gothic staircase and employed master craftsmen to undertake his designs for the chimneypieces.

Croft Castle was put up for sale in 1799 by Thomas Johnes. (Note: Thomas Johnes II (1748–1816) inherited thousands of acres in mid Wales where he built at Hafod Uchtryd, Ceredigion, a striking gothic house with its library designed by Thomas Baldwin of Bath. The estate was planted with three million trees in the picturesque style as advocated by Johnes's cousin the aesthete Richard Payne Knight. The artist J. M. W. Turner (1775–1851) visited and painted a romantic view of Hafod in 1789. Hafod suffered a serious fire in 1807 and Johnes's priceless library was destroyed. The house was rebuilt by Thomas Baldwin but it was demolished in 1958 by the Forestry Commission.) It was bought by Somerset Davies (c.1754–1817), MP for Ludlow, whose descendants, the Kevill-Davies, sold Croft back to Katherine, Lady Croft, in 1923. The castle had undergone further alterations in 1913 to the designs of the architect Walter Sarel (1863–1941) who removed the central section of the eighteenth-century Gothic entrance front replacing it with a battlemented porch and mullioned bay window above; the entrance hall was lined with oak panelling. Also removed were most of Pritchard's crenellations along the parapets. Walter Sarel redesigned the dining room. In 1937, the seventeenth-century service wing to the north-west was demolished to make the house more compact.

In 1957, Croft was threatened with demolition following the destruction of eighteen other great houses in the county; the destruction of country houses in 20th-century Britain was gathering pace across the country, and continued through the 1960s. Diana Uhlman (née Croft), was determined that Croft would not suffer the same fate. An endowment was raised by some members of the family before the National Trust would agree to take on the house and remaining estate. The castle opened to the public in 1960 after Michael, Lord Croft, had acquired paintings and furniture for display in the showrooms and his sister Diana established and funded the Croft Trust. The house is still occupied by members of the family.

=== Family ===
Members of the Croft family include:

- Sir Richard Croft (1429/30-1509), royal official for Kings Edward IV, Edward V, Richard III, and Henry VII
- Thomas Croft (c.1435–1488), shipowner and patron of Atlantic exploration
- Sir James Croft (c.1518–1590), Lord Deputy of Ireland and leading conspirator in Wyatt's Rebellion. He was also Comptroller of the Household to Elizabeth I.
- Sir Herbert Croft (died 1629)
- Margaret Croft (died 1637), lady in waiting to Elizabeth Stuart, Queen of Bohemia.
- Herbert Croft, Bishop of Hereford (1603–1691), chaplain to King Charles I and dean of the Chapels Royal to Charles II
- William Croft (c.1678–1727), organist and composer
- Sir Herbert Croft, 5th Baronet (1751–1816), writer and lexicographer
- Sir Richard Croft, 6th Baronet (1762–1818), physician and man-midwife
- Sir James Herbert Croft (1907–1941), died on active service with No 1 Commando
- Henry Page Croft, 1st Baron Croft (1881–1947), soldier and politician, Under-Secretary of State for War 1940–1945
- Michael Croft, 2nd Baron Croft (1916-1997), collector of modern art
- Bernard Page Croft, 3rd Baron Croft (born 1949)

== Architecture and description ==
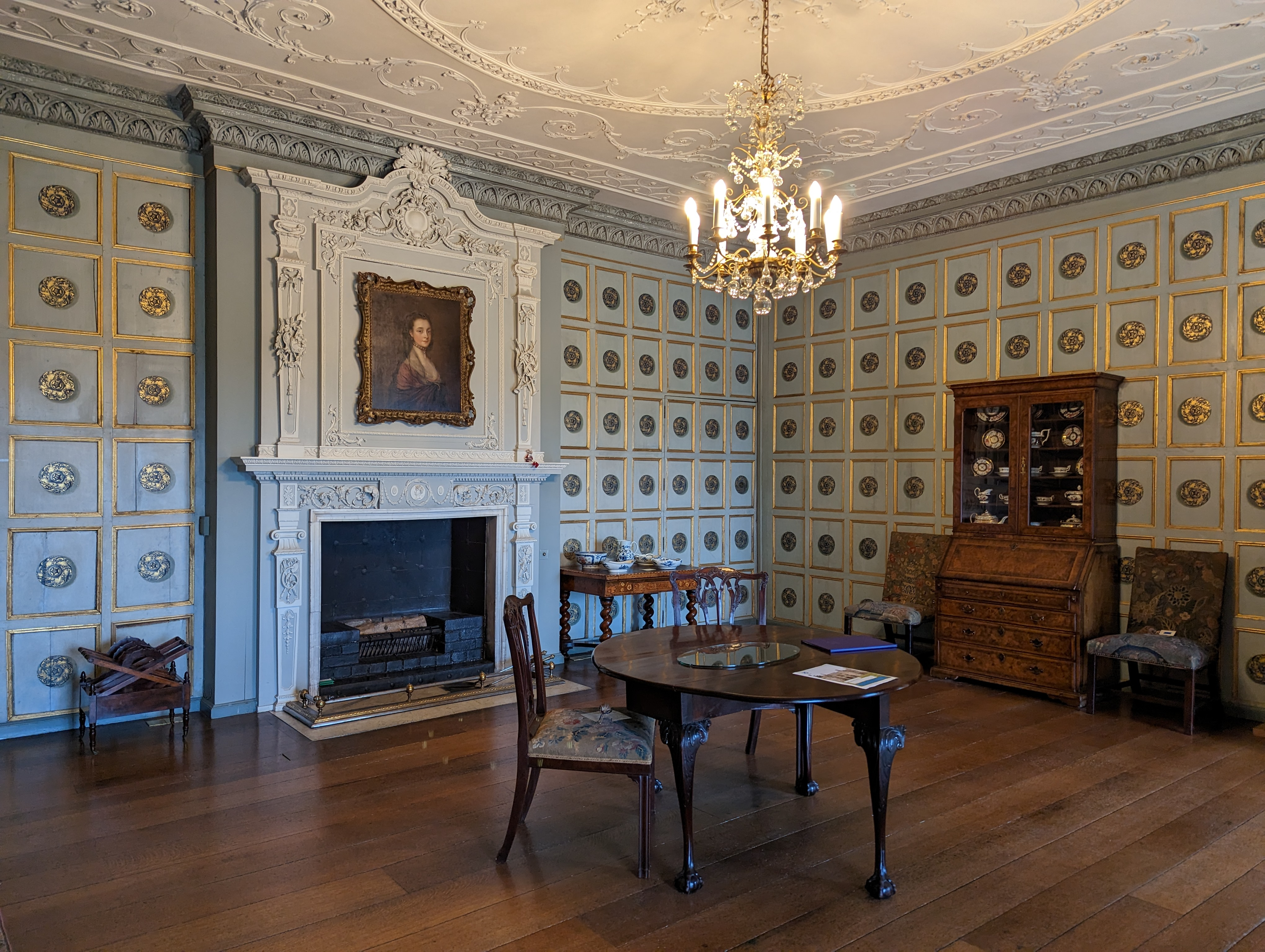
The Blue Room at Croft Castle

The present building dates from the 1660s during the time when Herbert Croft was Bishop of Hereford, replacing an earlier house some thirty yards to the west, which was excavated by Herefordshire County Archaeologist Prof. Keith Ray and volunteers in 2002. The manor house is a quadrangular stone structure around a central courtyard with round corner towers, and a square bay on the north elevation. Some stone mullion windows remain on all elevations. The castle is one of the first examples of medieval revival, and has affinities to Ruperra Castle, Caerphilly, and Lulworth Castle, Wareham, Dorset.

=== Listing designations ===
Croft Castle is a Grade I listed building. The stable block, and two stretches of walling, are listed at Grade II. Three estate buildings also have Grade II listings, the Gothic Pumphouse, Croft Lodge, and Cock Gate Cottage. The Church of St Michael is listed Grade I. The garden and parkland surrounding the castle have their own Grade II* listing.

== Garden and parkland ==
The property has a three-acre walled garden. It also has a Georgian stable block. The estate has an avenue of Sweet Chestnut trees which were planted over four hundred years ago. Beech and oak trees line the main drive. The Fishpool Valley was landscaped in the eighteenth century with descending ponds, a grotto, a Gothic pumphouse, an ice house and a lime kiln, and has undergone major restoration to bring it back to its scenic origins.

== Church of St Michael ==
The Church of St Michael dates from around the 14th century. The box pews are seventeenth-century and there are some medieval floor tiles made at Malvern. and the fine tomb for Sir Richard and Eleanor Croft bears a resemblance to that of Henry VII in Westminster Abbey. The ceiling above the altar is seventeenth-century and is painted with clouds and gilded stars.

== Hill fort ==
The parkland includes an Iron Age hill fort known as Croft Ambrey.

== Location ==
The site is in the civil parish of Croft and Yarpole, 5 miles (8.0 km) north-west of Leominster, in Herefordshire, England. It is surrounded by 1,500 acres of woodland, farmland and parkland. It is at grid reference SO449655. The Mortimer Trail, a long-distance footpath, passes by.

== Gallery ==
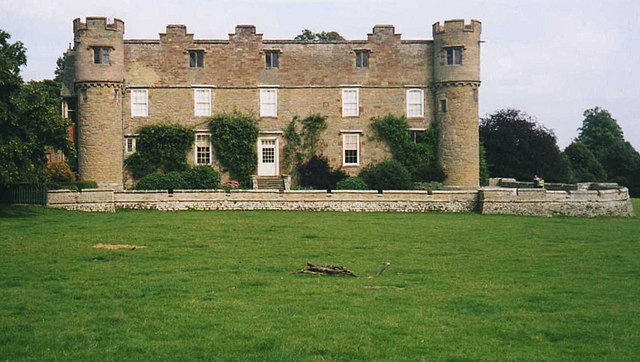
The castle

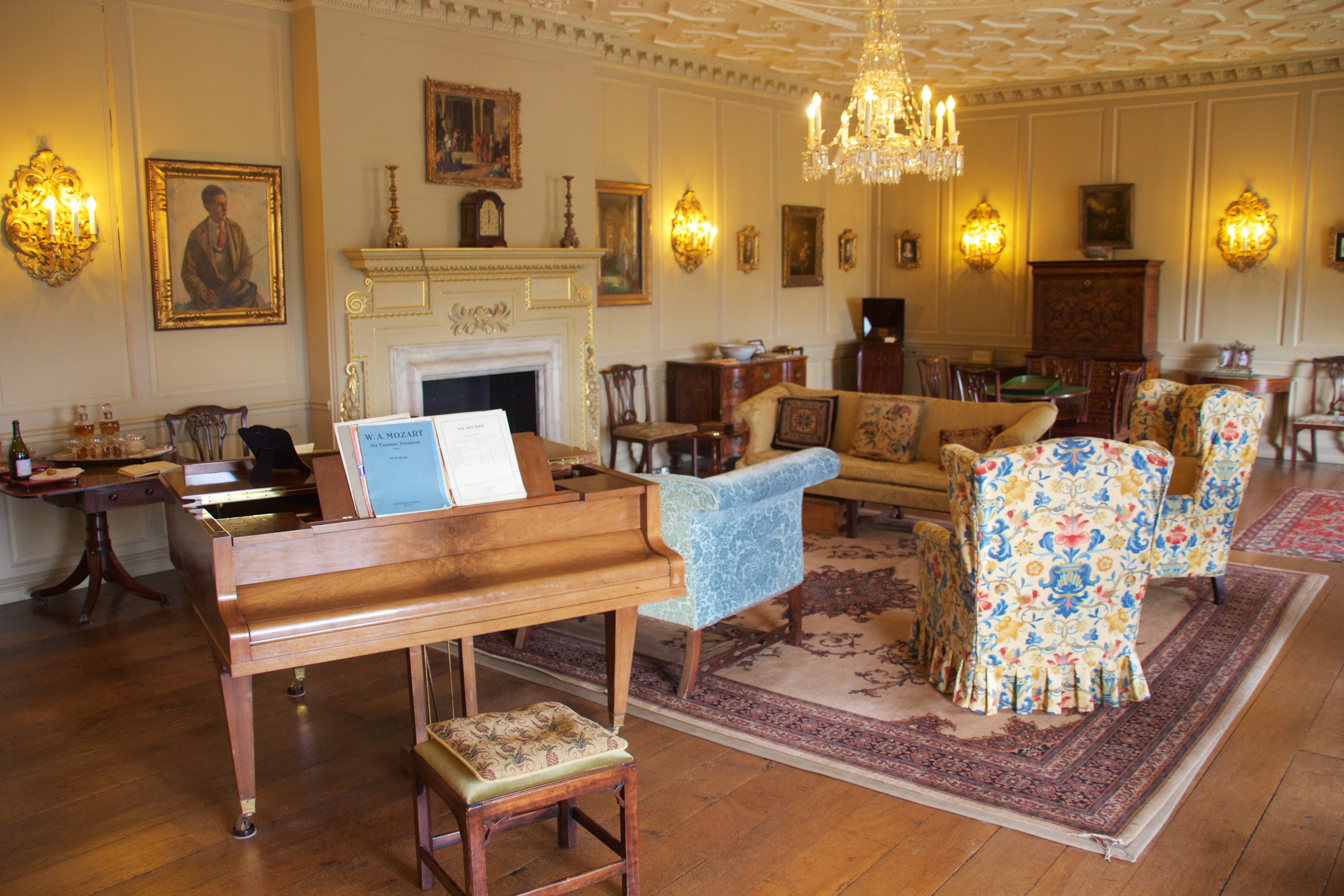
Interior

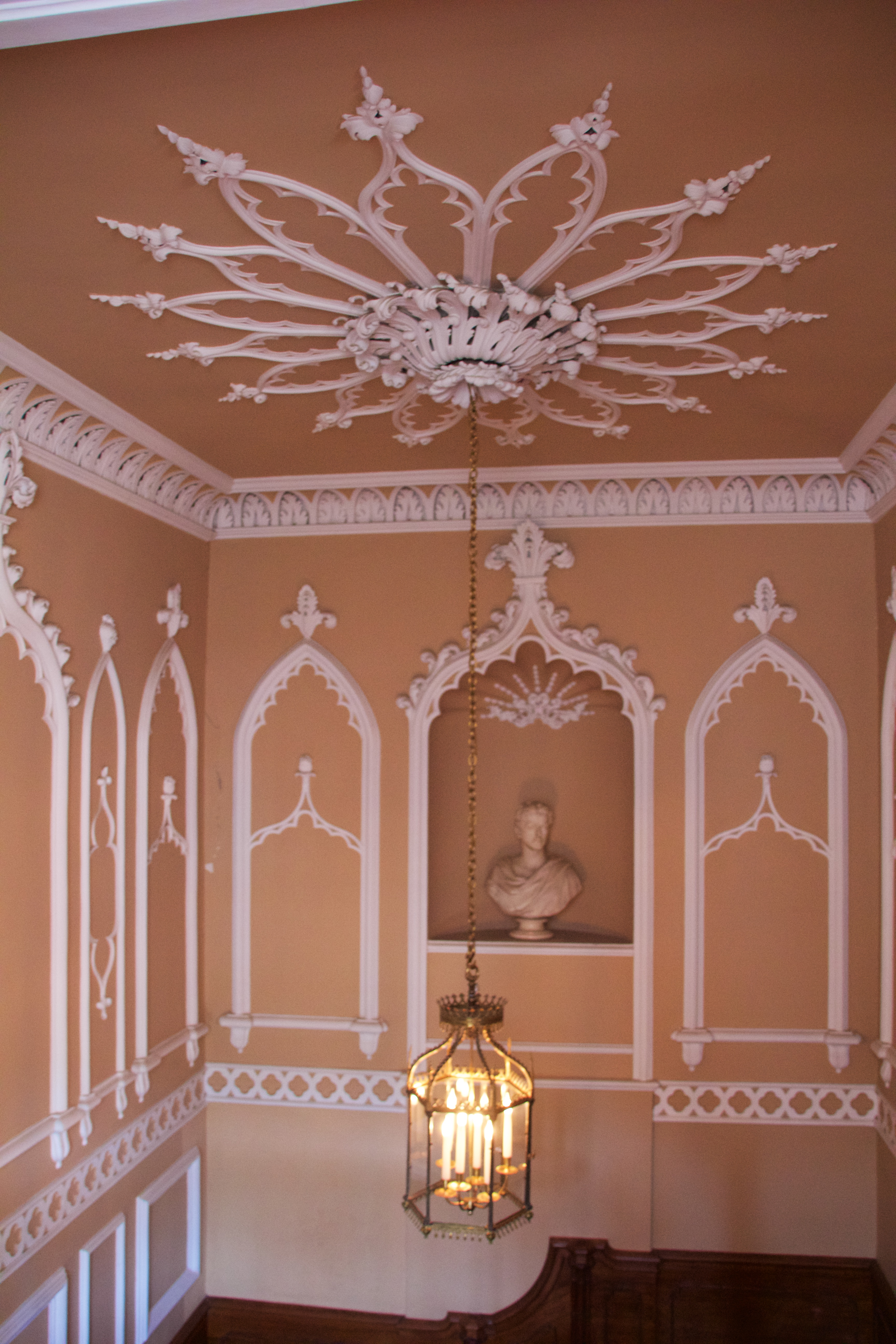
Plasterwork

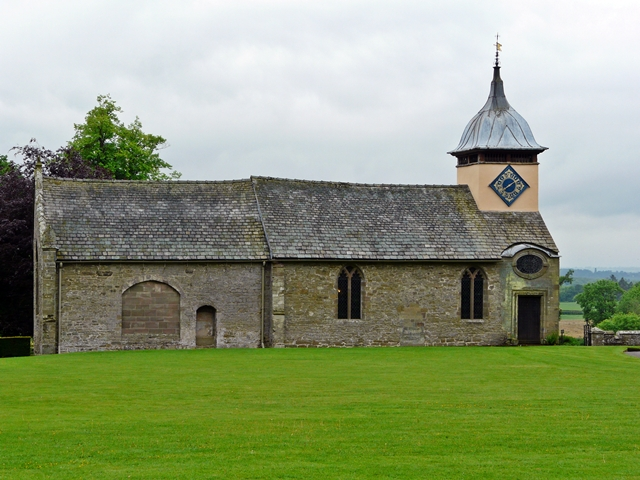
St Michael's Church

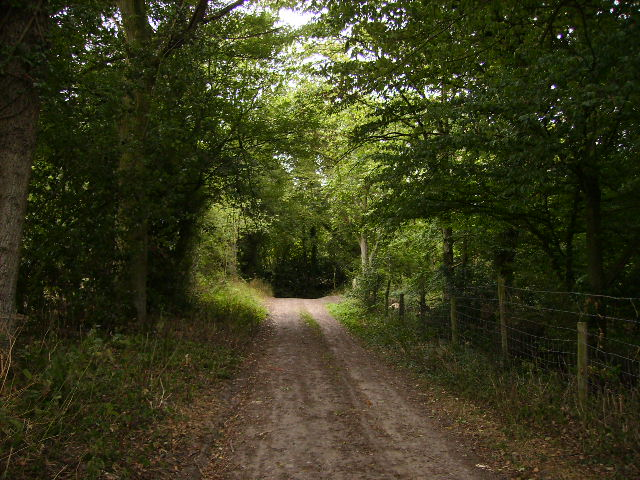
The Mortimer Trail

== See also ==
- Knight v Knight (1840) 3 Beav 148

== Notes, references and sources ==
=== Sources ===
- Brooks, Alan; Pevsner, Nikolaus (2012). Herefordshire. The Buildings of England. Yale University Press. ISBN 978-0-300-12575-7.
- Croft, Owen George Scudamore (1949). House of Croft of Croft Castle. Hereford.
- Fry, Plantagenet Somerset (1980). The David & Charles Book of Castles. David & Charles. ISBN 0-7153-7976-3.
- Johnes, Thomas (1992). A Land of Pure Delight: Letters of Thomas Johnes. Gomer Press.
- Ince, L. (1991). The Knight family and the British iron industry 1695–1902.
- Page, R. (1979). "Richard and Edward Knight: ironmasters of Bringewood and Wolverley". Transactions of Woolhope Naturalists' Field Club. 43.
