= Roger of Mortemer =

11th-century general

Roger I of Mortemer (Roger de Mortemer, Roger de Mortimer, Roger Mortimer) (fl. 1054 - aft. 1078), founded the abbey of St. Victor en Caux in the Pays de Caux of Upper Normandy as early as 1074 CE. Roger claimed the castle of Wigmore, Herefordshire that was built by William FitzOsbern, 1st Earl of Hereford. This castle became the chief barony of Roger's descendants. He was the first Norman ancestor to assume the name Mortimer, as in the place-name Mortemer-en-Brai, the land on which the village and castle was located.

== Background ==
=== Castle in Mortemer ===
In 1054, the territory of Évreux was invaded by French armies led by Odo, the brother of King Henry I of France. In response, Duke William II of Normandy sent his general Roger "fili Episcopi", along with other commanders, to oppose Odo's forces. They met at the castle in Mortemer, Seine-Maritime where the battle of Mortemer ensued. Roger was victorious against Odo, with Guy Comte de Ponthieu taken prisoner. Roger then took possession of the castle in Mortemer and assumed its name. However, his hold on the property was short lived due to a breach of duty to Duke William. Roger had entertained an enemy of the Duke, who was a French operative known as Count Ralph III “the Great”. Count Ralph was Roger's father-in-law, and thus gave the Count shelter for three days at his castle in Mortemer until he was able to safely return to his own territories. Upon discovering the news that Roger was providing safe haven for an enemy, Duke William banished Roger from Normandy and confiscated his possessions, giving them to his nephew, William de Warenne. Eventually, Roger was pardoned by the Duke, but was never able to retain the castle in Mortemer. It wasn't until Roger's son, Ranulph de Mortemer, was able to repossess the property by grant of Duke William. He is last seen in a document dated between 1078 and 1080.

=== Family ===
The origin of Roger of Mortemer has been subject to much scholarly debate. Only two early sources provide information. Orderic Vitalis calls William de Warenne consanguineo ejus (his cousin/kinsman), while Robert de Torigny confusingly provides three different versions of his parentage that, though inconsistent, all make him either brother or son, of William de Warenne. Historian Thomas Stapleton would identify him with Roger filius Episcopi (bishop's son), who was child of Hugh, bishop of Coutances, and he makes Rodulf de Warenne another son of Hugh, thus making Roger de Mortimer uncle of William de Warenne.

However, L.C. Loyd showed that the two Rogers were distinct, and that Radulf, though related to Roger filius Episcopi, was not his brother. Loyd points to a Rogeri filii Radulfi de Warethna (Roger, son of Rodulf de Warenne) who appears in a pair of charters from the 1040s. Loyd was hesitant to connect them because William de Warenne was thought to have been son of this Rodulf, but evidence indicates he was not Roger's brother.

Katherine Keats-Rohan concluded that two Rodulfs were mistakenly combined into one, and that Roger was son of Rodulf (I) de Warenne and his wife Beatrice, while William de Warenne was his nephew, son of Rodulf (II) and Emma, and as this removes many of Loyd's concerns, she identifies Roger de Mortimer with Roger, son of Rodulf. C.P. Lewis calls this hypothesis the "most plausible" solution. Robert de Torigny called Roger's mother, who is not named, one of the nieces of Gunnor, Duchess of Normandy. This would seemingly make Beatrice that niece. Keats-Rohan identifies her with a later widow, Beatrice, daughter of Tesselin, vicomte of Rouen.

Roger married Hadewisa, a Lady who inherited the Mers-les-Bains on the river mouth of Bresle and the district of Vimeu. Her father might have been Ralph III "The Great", Count of Amiens. Roger and Hadewisa had at least three children: Ranulph, Hugh, and William.
