= Wigmore Abbey =

Former religious house in Herefordshire

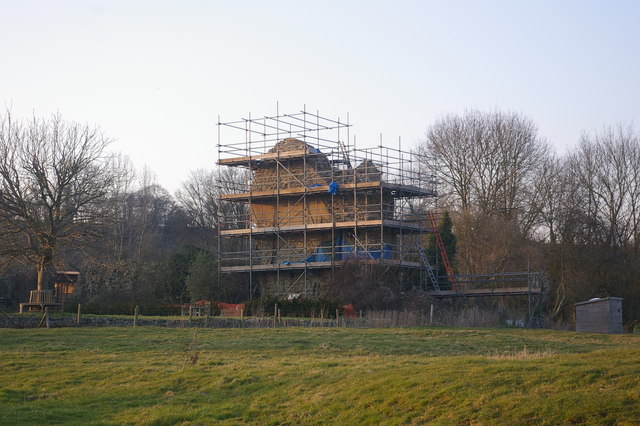
The remains of Wigmore Abbey being consolidated

Wigmore Abbey was an abbey of Canons Regular with a grange, from 1179 to 1530, situated about a mile (2 km) north of the village of Wigmore, Herefordshire, England: grid reference SO 410713. Only ruins of the abbey now remain and on Historic England's Heritage at Risk Register their condition is listed as 'very bad'.

== History of the abbey ==
The founding of the abbey was contemplated by Ranulph de Mortimer in the reign of Henry I, but only brought to fruition by his son, Hugh de Mortimer, who had the abbey consecrated at Wigmore in 1179 in the parish of Leintwardine by Robert Foliot, the Bishop of Hereford. The construction of the abbey was also assisted by other local landowners, especially Brian de Brampton and his John, who contributed building materials from their woods and quarries. The abbey community had been some thirty years in moving through various sites in northern Herefordshire before this final consecration. In this it was one of the most moved foundations in the country, having been settled during these years occasionally at Shobdon, Llanthony Priory and Lye or Eye as it has been written.

At the time it has been suggested that this was the largest monastery in the county, followed by Abbey Dore and Leominster Priory.

The first abbot was Simon Merlymond. Andrew of St Victor (c. 1100–1175) was abbot from 1148 to 1155 and 1162–1175.

The abbey church, like the church at Wigmore, was dedicated to St James. As they were the principal patrons of the abbey, many members of the Mortimer family were buried there, among them five Earls of March.

The abbey continued to flourish until the period of the Dissolution of the Monasteries in 1530, when it was destroyed. The remains of the building were given to Sir T. Palmer.

Wigmore Abbey is thought to be the place of origin of a manuscript outlining its own history and founding, as well as the lineage of Roger Mortimer, whose father Edmund petitioned Parliament (successfully) to be named heir to the throne in 1374. His claim was superseded by King Henry IV's accession to the throne. The manuscript concerning the Mortimers and the foundation of Wigmore Abbey is now housed at the University of Chicago. Another chronicle has been lost, but copies of the beginning and the end of this have survived in Manchester and Dublin.

== Burials ==
- Ranulph de Mortimer
- Stephen of Aumale and his wife, Hawise de Mortimer d'Aumale
- Roger Mortimer of Wigmore
- Maud de Braose, Baroness Mortimer
- Roger Mortimer, 1st Baron Mortimer
- Roger Mortimer, 1st Earl of March
- Joan de Geneville, 2nd Baroness Geneville
- Roger Mortimer, 2nd Earl of March
- Edmund Mortimer (1302–1331)
- Edmund Mortimer, 3rd Earl of March
- Roger Mortimer, 4th Earl of March
- Hugh de Mortimer and his wife, Maud le Meschin
- Edmund Mortimer, 2nd Baron Mortimer
- Margaret Mortimer, Baroness Mortimer
- Ralph de Mortimer

== Recent history of the remains ==
The land encompassing the abbey remains was owned by the Powell family, and later by the Brierley family. Several fields have been purchased by local farmers. The ruins themselves were sold to British actor John Challis (best known as Boycie from Only Fools and Horses), who lived in the abbot's lodging from 1998 until his death in 2021. The Green Green Grass, starring John Challis, was filmed at Wigmore Abbey along with other locations in the area.
