= St James' Church, Wigmore =

Church of St James, Wigmore
- Church of St James, Wigmore
- 52°18′59.4″N 2°51′45.58″W
- OS grid reference: SO 41292 69066
- Location: Wigmore, Herefordshire
- Country: England
- Denomination: Church of England
- Website: friendsofstjameswigmore.org.uk

Administration
- Diocese: Diocese of Hereford

Listed Building – Grade I
- Official name: Church of St James
- Designated: 11 June 1959
- Reference no.: 1178822

St James' Church is an Anglican church in the village of Wigmore, in Herefordshire, England. The building dates from the late 11th century, with modifications in the 14th and 15th centuries. There was restoration in 1864 by George Frederick Bodley. It is Grade I listed.

On 1 August 2026, the church, in the Diocese of Hereford, was closed for regular services, but it remains open for activities and events, and occasional church services. Regular services continue at the church in Aymestrey.

== Background ==
In the late 11th century, when the church was built in its original form, the tenant-in-chief, as recorded in the Domesday Book, and owner of Wigmore Castle, was Ranulph de Mortimer. The church was extended in the early 14th century by Roger Mortimer, 1st Earl of March, who at this period extended Wigmore Castle into a palatial residence.

== Description ==
Interior, looking east

The church is built of local sandstone rubble, with ashlar and tufa dressings. There is a nave, chancel, south aisle and north chapel, and a west tower. The south porch was added in the 19th century.

The nave was built in the late 11th century. The north wall has herringbone masonry, known as opus spicatum, surviving from this time; it is supposed that the rest of the nave once had this construction. The nave was rebuilt and extended in the early 14th century. At this time the chancel arch was rebuilt, and the south aisle and south arcade were built, also the roof of the south aisle. In the 15th century a north chapel of two bays was created, of which the western part was made into the present chapel in the 19th century, the rest being demolished. The roof of the nave dates from the early 15th century.

The west tower was built in the mid 14th century; the sill of the west window is a re-used stone altar, on which incised crosses can be seen. There are six bells in the tower; they were donated in 1721 by Robert Harley, Earl of Oxford. One of the bells was recast in 1889. There is a clockface on the east side of the tower, with an 18th-century clock mechanism.

=== Interior details ===
Herringbone masonry in the nave

In the chancel there is beneath the south-east window a double sedilia, of the 19th century, the stone arm between the seats being of the 14th century. Next to this is a 14th-century piscina. The roof dates from the 19th century.

The octagonal font is medieval. The pulpit is of the early 16th century; it is decagonal, with seven linenfold panelled sides, on a central octagonal post with radiating struts.

Behind the altar is the tombstone of Alexander Clogie, vicar from 1647 until his death in 1698. There are memorials in the north chapel to members of the Davies and Kevill Davies families of Croft Castle and Wigmore Hall, dating from 1738 to 1832.

On the south wall there is a war memorial erected after the Great War. The sculptor, William Storr-Barber (1876–1934), created several war memorials in and around Leominster.

=== Churchyard ===
The churchyard is nearly circular, and its design on a ridgeline suggests that it was the site of an earlier late-Celtic church.

There is a churchyard cross about 7 yards south-east of the church. It stands on a 19th-century plinth of three steps, and the octagonal tapered shaft anf cross are 19th-century. The base dates from the 14th century. It is listed Grade II.

== See also ==
- Grade I listed buildings in Herefordshire
