= Mortimer =

Mortimer is an English surname.

== Norman origins ==
The surname Mortimer has a Norman origin, deriving from the village of Mortemer, Seine-Maritime, Normandy. A Norman castle existed at Mortemer from an early point; one 11th century figure associated with the castle was Roger, lord of Mortemer, who fought in the Battle of Mortemer in 1054. The 12th century abbey of Mortemer at Lisors near Lyons-la-Forêt is assumed to share the same etymological origin, and was granted to the Cistercian order by Henry II in the 1180s. According to the toponymists Albert Dauzat and later, François de Beaurepaire, there are two possible explanations for such a place name:

First, a small pond must have already existed before the land was given to the monks and have already been called Mortemer like the two other Mortemers, because the word mer "pond" was not used anymore beyond the Xth century. This word is only attested in North-Western France and of Frankish or Saxon origin mari/meri "mere", "lake"; mort(e) "dead" is also quite common to mean "stagnant" (in Port-Mort "the port with stagnant water", Morteau "dead water", etc.). Second, the monks could have given the name Mortemer to their drainage lake to remember the other Mortemer for any kind of reason we don't know, making a pun at the same time with Mer Morte "Dead Sea".

== Medieval magnates ==
Arms of Mortimer (Mortimer of Wigmore): Barry or and azure, on a chief of the first two pallets between two base esquires of the second over all an inescutcheon argent

In the Middle Ages, the Mortimers became a powerful dynasty of Marcher Lords in the Welsh Marches, first as barons of Wigmore Castle, Herefordshire and later as Earl of March from 1328 to 1425. Through marriage, the Mortimers came close to the English throne during the reign of Richard II, though their royal claim was ignored after Richard II's deposition by his cousin Henry of Bolingbroke in 1399. The Mortimer claims were later inherited by the House of York, which claimed the throne upon the Earl of March Edward IV's victory in the Battle of Towton, 1461.

Members of the noble Mortimer family included:

- Ranulph de Mortimer, Lord of Wigmore, Herefordshire and Seigneur of St Victor-en-Caux, Seine-Maritime, Normandy
- Hugh de Mortimer, Lord of Wigmore
- Roger Mortimer, Lord of Wigmore
- Ralph de Mortimer, Lord of Wigmore
- Roger Mortimer, 1st Baron Mortimer (1231–1282)
  - Isabella Mortimer, Countess of Arundel (after 1247 – before 1 April 1292/after 1300)
- Edmund Mortimer, 2nd Baron Mortimer (1251–1304)
- Roger Mortimer, 1st Earl of March (1287–1330)
  - Edmund Mortimer (1302–1331)
  - Katherine Mortimer, Countess of Warwick (1314–1369)
  - Agnes Mortimer, Countess of Pembroke (1317–1368)
- Roger Mortimer, 2nd Earl of March (1328–1360)
- Thomas Mortimer (c. 1350 – 1399), illegitimate member of the Mortimer family who opposed Richard II
- Edmund Mortimer, 3rd Earl of March (1352–1381)
  - Lady Philippa Mortimer (1375–1400)
  - Edmund Mortimer (rebel) (1376–1409)
- Roger Mortimer, 4th Earl of March (1374–1398)
- Edmund Mortimer, 5th Earl of March (1391–1425)

== Other people ==
- Amanda Jay Mortimer (born 1944), American urban planner and consultant
- Angela Mortimer (1932–2025), British tennis player
- Bob Mortimer (born 1959), English comedian and actor
- Carole Mortimer (born 1960), English romance novelist
- Chris Mortimer (born 1958), Australian rugby league footballer
- Christopher Mortimer (born 1984) Rhode Island non-socialite
- Conor Mortimer (born 1982), Irish Gaelic football player
- Daniel Mortimer (born 1989), Australian rugby league footballer
- Debra Mortimer, Australian judge
- Edmund Mortimer (actor) (1874–1944), American actor and film director
- Edward A. Mortimer Jr. (1922–2002), American pediatrician, epidemiologist, and public health educator
- Emily Mortimer (born 1971), English actress
- Favell Lee Mortimer (1802–1878), English Evangelical author of educational books for children
- Frank Mortimer (1932–2009), English rugby league footballer who played in the 1950s and 1960s
- Gary Mortimer (born 1967), English aeronaut
- George Ferris Whidborne Mortimer (1805–1871), English schoolmaster and divine
- Ian Mortimer (born 1983), Canadian sprint canoeist
- Ian Mortimer (historian) (born 1967), British writer
- James Mortimer (1833–1911), American chess player, journalist and playwright
- James Mortimer (hurdler) (born 1983), New Zealand hurdler
- Jill Mortimer (born 1965), British Conservative politician, former MP for Hartlepool (2021–2024)
- John Mortimer (c. 1656 – 1736), English agriculturalist
- John Mortimer (1923–2009), British barrister, dramatist, screenwriter and author
- John B. Mortimer, Hong Kong judge
- John Hamilton Mortimer (1740–1779), British painter
- John Robert Mortimer (1825–1911), Yorkshire corn merchant and archaeologist
- Kenneth Mortimer, President Emeritus of Western Washington University, eleventh president of the University of Hawai`i system and Chancellor of the University of Hawai`i at Manoa 1993–2001
- Maddie Mortimer (born 1996), British writer
- Mary Mortimer (1816–1877), British-born American educator
- Minnie Mortimer (born 1980), American fashion designer and socialite
- Myra Mortimer (1894–1972), American contralto
- Richard Mortimer (1852–1918), American real estate investor and society leader
- Roger Mortimer (racing) (1909–1991), British horse-racing correspondent
- Steve Mortimer (born 1956), Australian rugby league footballer
- Thomas Mortimer (1730–1810), English writer in the field of economics
- Tinsley Mortimer (born 1976), American socialite
- Tony Mortimer (born 1970), British songwriter, composer, singer and rapper; member of British 1990s pop group East 17

== Fictional characters ==
- Colonel Douglas Mortimer, played by Lee Van Cleef in the film For a Few Dollars More
- Dr. Mortimer, in the Sherlock Holmes novel The Hound of the Baskervilles by Sir Arthur Conan Doyle
- Ignatius Mortimer Meen, the villain in the 1995 video game I.M. Meen
- Lord Mortimer, played by Billy House in the 1946 film Bedlam
- Philip Mortimer, a protagonist in Blake and Mortimer, a Belgian comics series created by Edgar P. Jacobs
- Mort (Mortimer), the eponymous protagonist of Mort, 4th novel in the Discworld series by Terry Pratchett
- Mortimer, a duck which comforts Travis Martinez in the show Yellowjackets

== See also ==
- Mort (name)
- Morton (surname)
- Morty
