= Mortemer =

Mortemer may refer to the following places in France:

- Mortemer, Oise, Picardy
- Mortemer, Seine-Maritime, Haute-Normandie
- Mortemer Abbey, a former Cistercian monastery in the Eure department, Haute-Normandie
