= Adforton =

Village in Herefordshire, England

Coordinates: 52.3338°N 2.8790°W

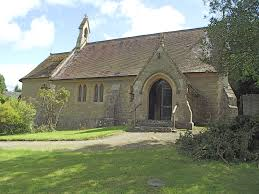
- St Andrews Church

- Location within Herefordshire
- Population: 2011 census
- OS grid reference: SO40417114
- Civil parish: Adforton
- Unitary authority: Herefordshire
- Ceremonial county: Herefordshire
- Region: West Midlands
- Country: England
- Sovereign state: United Kingdom
- Post town: Craven Arms
- Postcode district: SY7
- Dialling code: 01568/01547
- Police: West Mercia
- Fire: Hereford and Worcester
- Ambulance: West Midlands
- UK Parliament: North Herefordshire

Adforton is a small village and a civil parish in north Herefordshire, England. It is on the A4110 main road approximately 22 miles (35 km) north of Hereford and of Wigmore, and is close to the Wales border.

== History ==
The name Adforton means 'settlement of Ad's fort'.

John Marius Wilson's Imperial Gazetteer of England and Wales describes Adforton as "a township with Stanway, Paytoe, and Grange, in the parish of Leintwardine, in Hereford 2 miles north west of Wigmore with a population of 250 people and 57 houses within the area."

== Demography ==
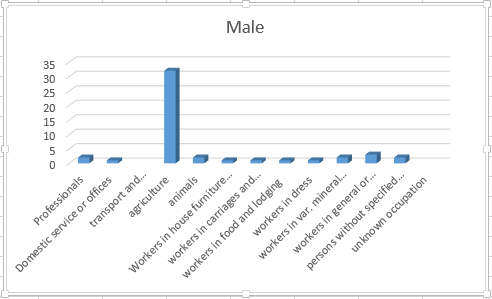
The bar graph shows the number of males employed in different occupations in Adforton during 1881.

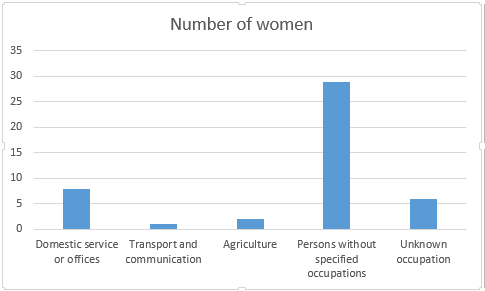
The graph shows the occupation types and number of women employed in them from the census data of 1881.

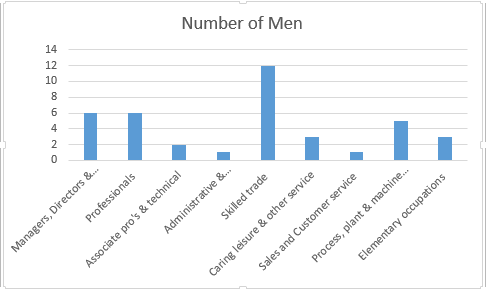
This bar graph shows the occupation data for males living in Adforton from the 2011 census data.

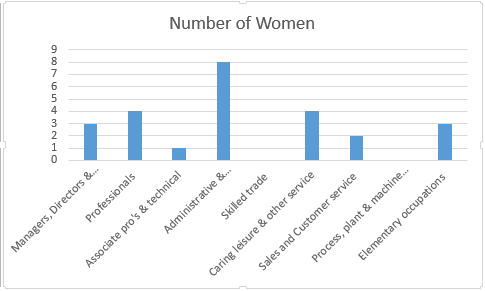
A bar graph to show occupational data for women in Adforton, using the 2011 census data.

Between 1881 and 2001 the population fluctuated, but reduced from 204 to 118. Census data shows a peak population of 215 in 1901. Since 2001, with its lowest point of 118 residents, the population rose, and by 2011 was 128.

The census data for 1881 shows that agricultural work was the dominant occupation among males, with 32 men working on farms and with animals; other occupation areas for men included the professions, furniture design and lodging. Data for females shows that most occupations (29) were unspecified and another six were unknown.

According to the 2011 census, occupations in skilled trades was the most widespread for men, while six men were variously employed as managers, directors, professionals and senior officials; occupations with lowest counts were in sales and customer service and administrative and secretarial occupations. Eight women were employed in administrative and secretarial services, with the lowest count being for professions.

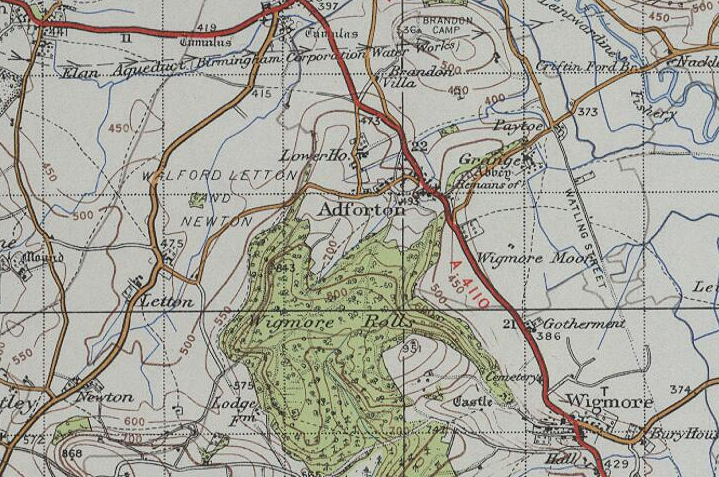
A map Designed in the 20th century by the Ordnance Survey, which shows the location of Adforton and its surroundings.

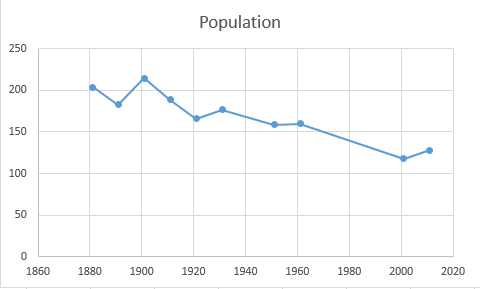
A scatter graph to show the population change in Adforton between 1881 and 2011.

== Church ==
St Andrew's Church was designed and built in 1875 by the architect John Pollard Seddon. Until St Andrew's was built there was only a 1863-built Primitive Methodist chapel. The church doubles as a community hall.

North of the village are the remains of Wigmore Abbey and fragments of its monastic grange. Established in 1179, in the Middle Ages the abbey was the largest, and among the most prosperous, in Herefordshire. The grange comprises a range of buildings which have now been converted into a house.
