= Ranulph de Mortimer =

Anglo-Norman lord

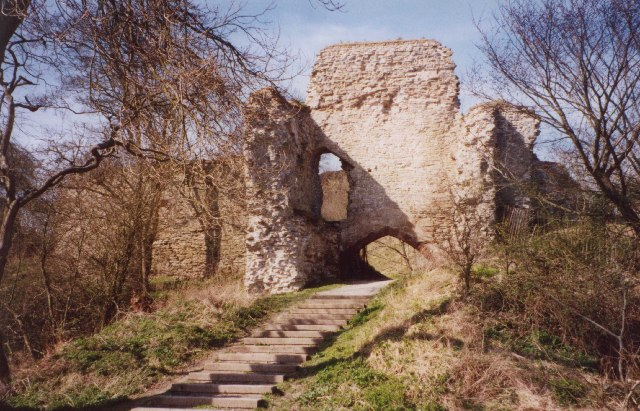
Ruins of Wigmore Castle, a property once owned by Ranulph de Mortimer

Ranulph I de Mortimer (Ralf, Ralph, Raoul de Mortemer) (born before c. 1070–died in/after 1104) was a Marcher Lord from the Montgomery lands in the Welsh Marches (border lands between Wales and England). In England, he was Lord of Wigmore in Herefordshire. In Normandy, he was the Seigneur of St. Victor-en-Caux. Ranulph was the founder of the English House of Mortimer of Wigmore. He acquired Wigmore Castle after William Fitz Osbern's son Roger de Breteuil joined the Revolt of the Earls of 1075. His lands and holdings in Herefordshire and Shropshire were granted to him by William the Conqueror before 1086.

== Background ==
=== Allegiance to England ===
After William the Conqueror's death, the Kingdom of England and the Duchy of Normandy were divided. Ranulph of Mortimer joined the ranks of the Rebellion of 1088 against the new King of England, William Rufus. Together with Norman, English and Welsh Marcher Lords, they invaded and conquered the lands of Hereford, Gloucester and Worcestershire. A year later, the revolt failed and the marches of Normandy, from Maine to the Evrecin, were in disorder. King William Rufus took advantage of this opportunity to align with the barons of Upper Normandy by bribing them. Of these barons, Ranulph maintained his land by accepting a bribe from the King in which he had to give his support to England. He did this by garrisoning his castle and sacking surrounding enemy territories as an attack against the new Duke of Normandy, Robert Curthose. The Norman baron allegiance set the stage for a race between the heirs of William I, where the Duke of Normandy and the King of England sought to gain as much support from powerful and influential houses as possible against each other.

=== Allegiance to Normandy ===
Throughout the power struggle between Normandy and England in the early 1090s, Ranulph ended up switching sides and submitting to the Duke of Normandy. At the Welsh Marches in 1093, Ranulph joined Norman forces, leading with Earl Roger of Shrewsbury, Ralph Tosny of Clifford Castle and Philip de Braose of Radnor. They invaded the ancient Welsh county of Radnorshire, which is now Powys, and sacked the kingdom of Cynllibiwg. This territory was known as Rhwng Gwy a Hafren, located between the Rivers Wye and Severn. They founded the castles of Dinieithon, near present Llandrindod Wells, and Cymaron in Maelienydd, located between Llanbister and Llangunllo. A century later, after the collapse of Norman authority, the descendants of Mortimer were eventually expelled from this territory by the Cynllibiwg rebellion of 1148.

=== Family ===
Ranulph de Mortemer was born in Normandy before 1070 and died in 1104 or after, at an unknown date. He was the son of the Norman baron Roger de Mortemer and Hawise. His father assumed the name Mortemer after being given the possession of the castle and village of Mortemer in the Pays de Bray, called sometimes Morte-mer sur Eaulne or en Brai. However, after the Battle of Mortemer of 1054, Roger lost the land and was banned from Normandy for his failure to capture an enemy of the Duke William. Decades later, the property was granted back to the Mortemer family, namely by Ranulph, who acquired it. They were related to William de Warenne, 1st Earl of Surrey, and descendants of a sister of Gunnor, the wife of Richard I of Normandy.

Ranulph married Millicent, whose parentage is currently unknown. Their daughter Hawise de Mortemer (d. 1127), married Earl Stephen of Aumale before 1100. Ranulph supported the cause to have his son-in-law replace Henry I of England; however, Henry had control of both England and Normandy until 1135.

Wigmore Castle remained the Mortimer dynasty's family home in England. Ranulph's son, Hugh I de Mortimer, rebuilt Cymaron Castle in 1144. Ranulph's grandson, Hugh de Mortimer II, married Maud (Matilda) de Meschines.

== Sources ==
- Tout, T.F. "Ralph (I) de Mortimer". Dictionary of National Biography. Vol. 39. pp. 130–131.
- Weis, Frederick Lewis Ancestral Roots of Certain American Colonist Who Came To America Before 1700 (8th ed.), line 136-24
