= Abbey of St Victor =

Abbey of St Victor may refer to:

- Abbey of St Victor, Marseille
- Abbey of Saint-Victor, Paris
- Abbey and namesake of Saint-Victor-l'Abbaye
