= Wigmore Abbey Grange =

Grade I listed structure in Herefordshire, United Kingdom

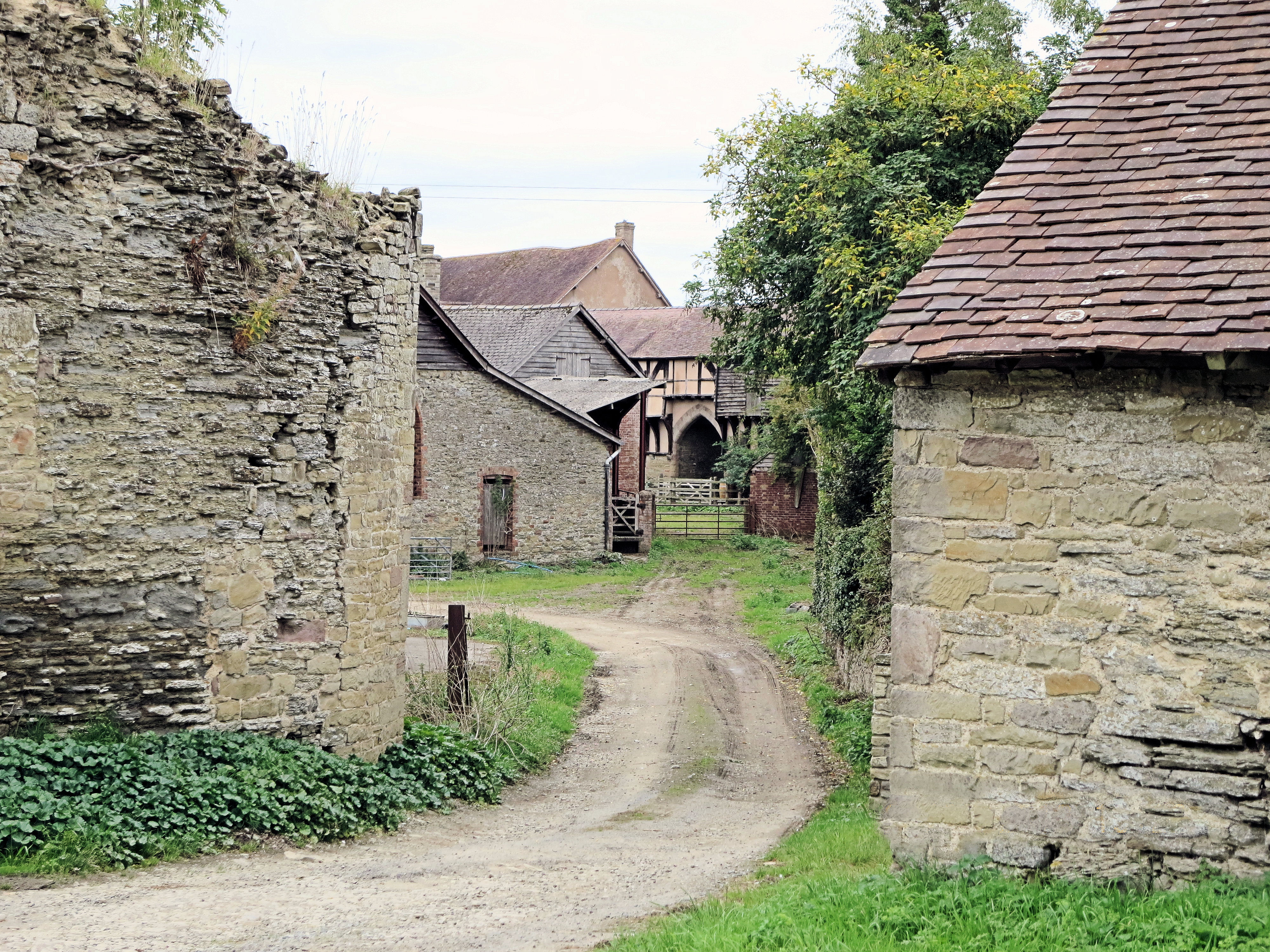
- The entrance gatehouses to the Grange

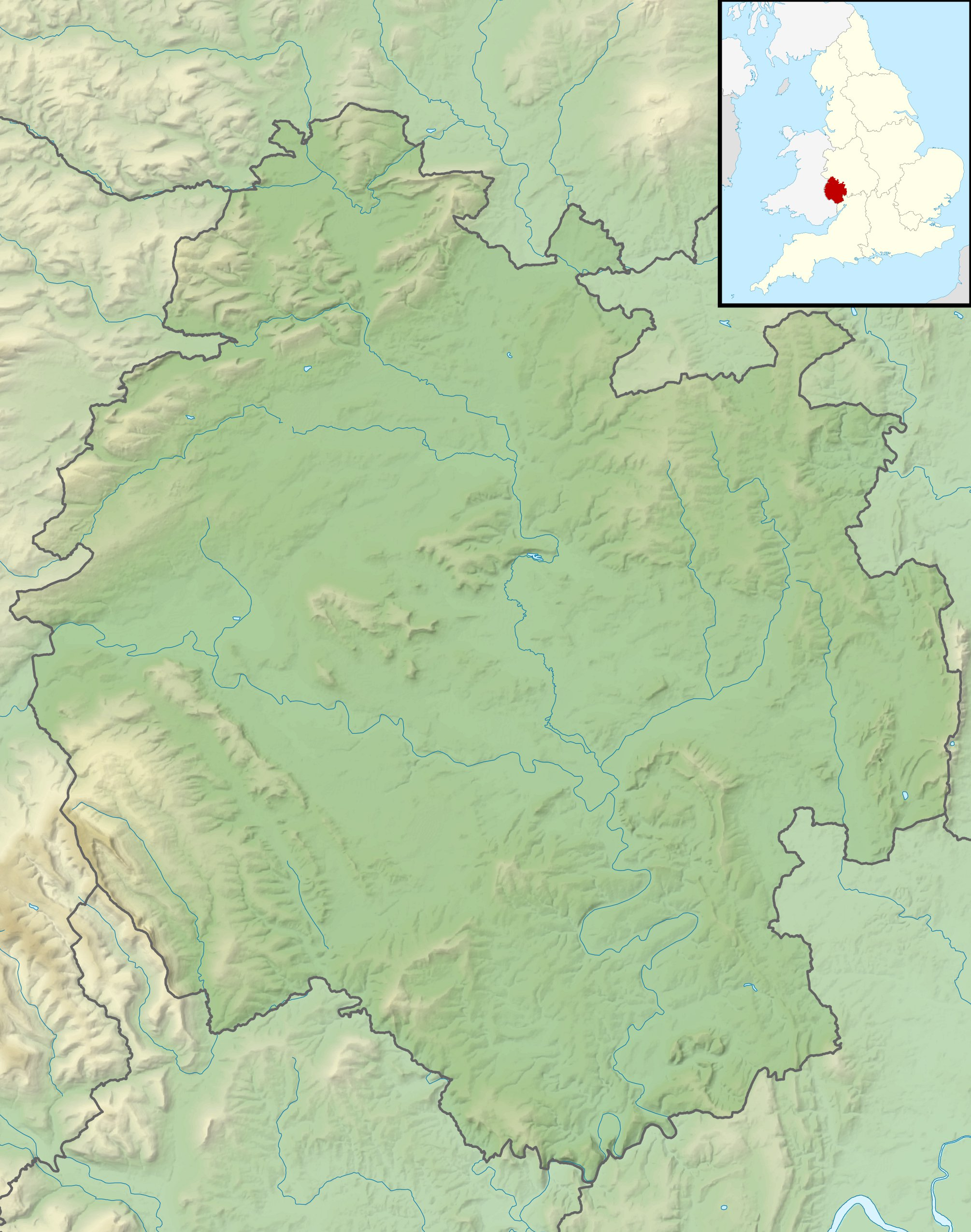
- Location within Herefordshire
- 52.3364°N 2.8667°W
- Type: Monastic grange
- Location: Adforton, Herefordshire

History
- Built: 12-14th centuries with later additions

Listed Building – Grade I
- Official name: The Grange, Adforton
- Designated: 11 June 1959
- Reference no.: 1082057

Listed Building – Grade I
- Official name: Gatehouse Attached to West End of the Grange
- Designated: 11 June 1959
- Reference no.: 1349753

Listed Building – Grade I
- Official name: Outbuilding About 95 Yards West-North-West of the Grange
- Designated: 11 June 1959
- Reference no.: 1082061

Listed Building – Grade I
- Official name: Storage Building About 100 Yards West-North-West of the Grange
- Designated: 11 June 1959
- Reference no.: 1179912

Listed Building – Grade II
- Official name: Summerhouse About 50 Yards South-East of the Grange
- Designated: 19 February 1987
- Reference no.: 1082059

Wigmore Abbey Grange is a complex of former monastic buildings just north of the village of Adforton, Herefordshire, England.

== History ==
Wigmore Abbey was founded by Hugh de Mortimer and was first established at Shobdon in 1135, moving to Wigmore in 1160 and finally to Adforton in 1172. Much of the abbey was destroyed in a Welsh uprising in 1221, but was rebuilt by Edmund Mortimer in the 1370s. Very little of the rebuilt abbey now remains, beyond some stretches of wall. In the Middle Ages the abbey developed into the largest in Herefordshire and built a farm, called a monastic grange, to supply provisions.

The Grange at Wigmore comprises a complex of structures dating from the 12th and the 14th centuries. The main building, The Grange, was developed from the abbot's lodgings and subsequently became the grange farmhouse.

In the mid-18th century, a family called Galliers were resident at the Grange and established a notable herd of Hereford cattle. The actor John Challis owned the Grange from 1998 until his death in 2021.

=== The Grange in art ===
The architect Edward Blore drew the abbot's lodging in 1850. The amateur artist Louisa Puller painted a similar view in a watercolour of 1941, as part of her work for the Recording Britain project. The artist John Piper painted the lodging in the 1950s.

== Architecture and description ==
The Grange is an L-shaped building, now of three storeys, although originally of two. The sub-structure is Norman, including the undercroft, but much of the upper part of the building is restoration work of the 16th, 17th and 20th centuries. The inner, and two outer, gatehouses are 14th century, while the range ends in an 18th century summer house. The Grange is a Grade I listed building. The gatehouse, and two outbuildings share this, the highest, listing designation, while a barn, gardens walls and a mounting block, and the summerhouse are listed Grade II.

== Sources ==
- Brooks, Alan; Pevsner, Nikolaus (2012). Herefordshire. The Buildings of England. Yale University Press. ISBN 978-0-300-12575-7.
- Brown, G. (2002). An Earthwork Survey and Investigation of Wigmore Castle, Herefordshire. English Heritage.
