= Georgia Evans =

Georgia Evans may refer to:

- Georgia Evans (footballer)
- Georgia Evans (rugby union)
