= Georgia Evans (footballer) =

Welsh footballer (born 1995)

Personal information
- Full name: Georgia Jayne Evans
- Date of birth: 16 October 1995 (age 31)
- Place of birth: Wales
- Positions: Defender; midfielder

Team information
- Current team: Bridgwater United
- Number: 8

Youth career
- West Bromwich Albion
- 2011–2013: Bristol Academy

Senior career*
Years	Team	Apps	(Gls)
2013–2017	Bristol Academy/City	20	(0)
2017–2019	Yeovil Town	32	(0)
2019–2020	Charlton Athletic	0	(0)
2020–	Bridgwater United	0	(0)

International career^{‡}
2015–	Wales	1	(0)
- * Club domestic league appearances and goals as of 20 July 2020 ‡ National team caps and goals as of 20 January 2020

Georgia Jayne Evans (born 16 October 1995) is a footballer who plays as a midfielder for Bridgwater United of the FA Women's National League South.

She joined the Bristol Academy Centre of Excellence in 2011 from Sporting Club Albion, and progressed through to Academy's first team in 2013. Evans has also represented Wales at senior, under-19, under-17 and under-16 levels.

She is a former pupil of Wigmore High School in Herefordshire.

In September 2017, Evans signed for WSL 1 side Yeovil Town ahead of the 2017–18 season. She joined Charlton Athletic in July 2019 and joined Bridgwater United from 2021-present.

== Appearances by season ==
As at 15 January 2016

Season	Club	Division	League		WSL Cup		FA Women's Cup		Champions League		Total	
Season	Club	Division	Starts (Sub)	Goals	Starts (Sub)	Goals	Starts (Sub)	Goals	Starts (Sub)	Goals	Starts (Sub)	Goals
2013	Bristol Academy	FA WSL	0 (0)	0	0 (0)	0	0 (0)	0	–	–	0 (0)	0
2014	Bristol Academy	FA WSL 1	1 (2)	0	0 (3)	0	0 (0)	0	0 (1)	0	1 (6)	0
2015	Bristol Academy	FA WSL 1	11 (1)	0	4 (0)	0	1 (0)	0	2 (0)	0	18 (1)	0
2016	Bristol City	FA WSL 2	0 (0)	0	0 (0)	0	0 (0)	0	–	–	0 (0)	0
Total			12 (3)	0	4 (3)	0	1 (0)	0	2 (1)	0	19 (7)	0
