= Somerset Davies =

English politician

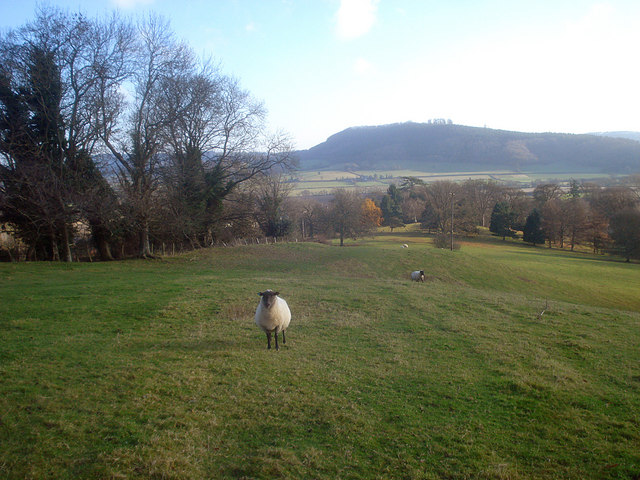
Sheep pasture near his former residence of Wigmore Hall

Somerset Davies (1754 – 15 October 1817) was an English politician who sat in the House of Commons representing Ludlow between from 1783 to 1784.

Davies lived at Wigmore Hall and at Croft Castle.
