= Wigmore High School =

Location
- Wigmore; Herefordshire, HR6 9UW; England
- Coordinates: 52.3148°N 2.8574°W

Information
- Type: Academy
- Local authority: Herefordshire
- Department for Education URN: 136405 Tables
- Ofsted: Reports
- Gender: Mixed
- Age: 10 to 16
- Enrolment: 4480 as of November 2015
- Website: http://www.wigmoreschool.org.uk/

Wigmore High School is a mixed secondary school in Wigmore, in the county of Herefordshire, England.

Previously a foundation school, in 2007, Wigmore High School federated with Wigmore Primary School, and now includes nursery school provision. In 2011, the federation converted to academy status. The other main feeder primary schools to Wigmore High School are Kingsland Primary School, Leintwardine Endowed CE Primary School, Orleton CE Primary School, Shobdon Primary School, and St Mary's CE Primary School in Bucknell, Shropshire.
