= Wigmore Castle =

Castle in Herefordshire, England

- Herefordshire, England
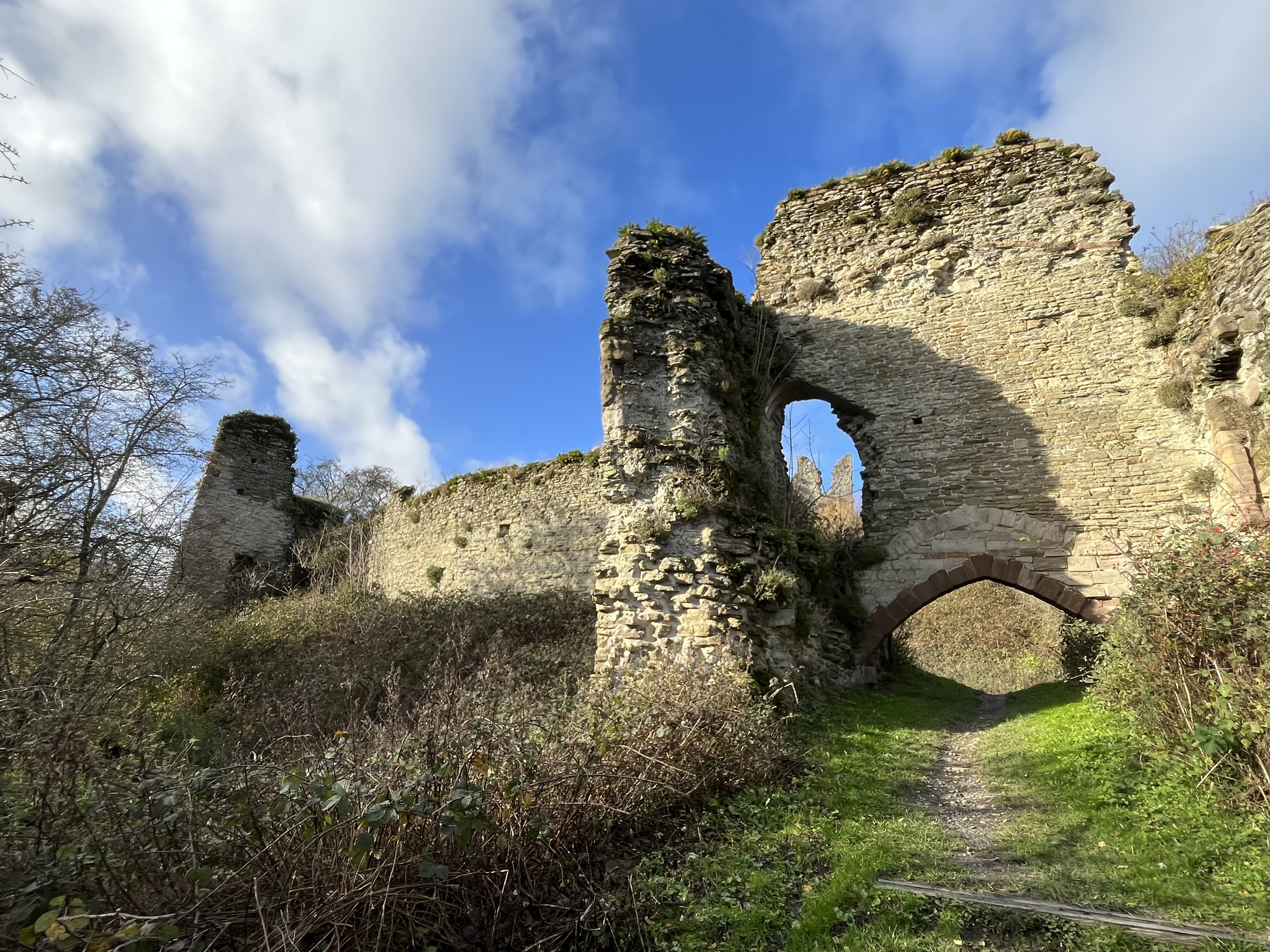
- Wigmore Castle

Site information
- Controlled by: English Heritage
- Condition: Ruined

Location
- Shown within Herefordshire.
- Location within Herefordshire
- Coordinates: 52.3177°N 2.8714°W
- Grid reference: grid reference SO407692

Site history
- Materials: wood and mats

Wigmore Castle is a ruined castle about 1 km (0.62 mi) from the village of Wigmore in the northwest region of Herefordshire, England.

== History ==
Wigmore Castle was founded after the Norman Conquest, probably c. 1070, by William FitzOsbern, 1st Earl of Hereford and a close associate of William the Conqueror. It was built on waste ground at a place called Merestun, the settlement by the mere or lake. The land was held at the time of the Conquest by Gunnfrothr or Gunnvarthr, who also held land at Lingen and Brampton Bryan. The associated village of Wigmore below the castle was probably also founded by FitzOsbern, perhaps around the earlier settlement.

The form of FitzOsbern's early castle at Wigmore is unknown, but given the scale of his fortifications at Chepstow, Monmouth and elsewhere, it is likely to have been substantial and probably covered much the same area as the present castle. In particular, he probably had a natural ravine reshaped to create a deep ditch behind the motte. No evidence of early stone defences has yet been discovered, leading to the conclusion that FitzOsbern's castle was built of timber, but it is just possible that the dense vegetation and thick deposits of debris conceal the foundations of an early stone keep.

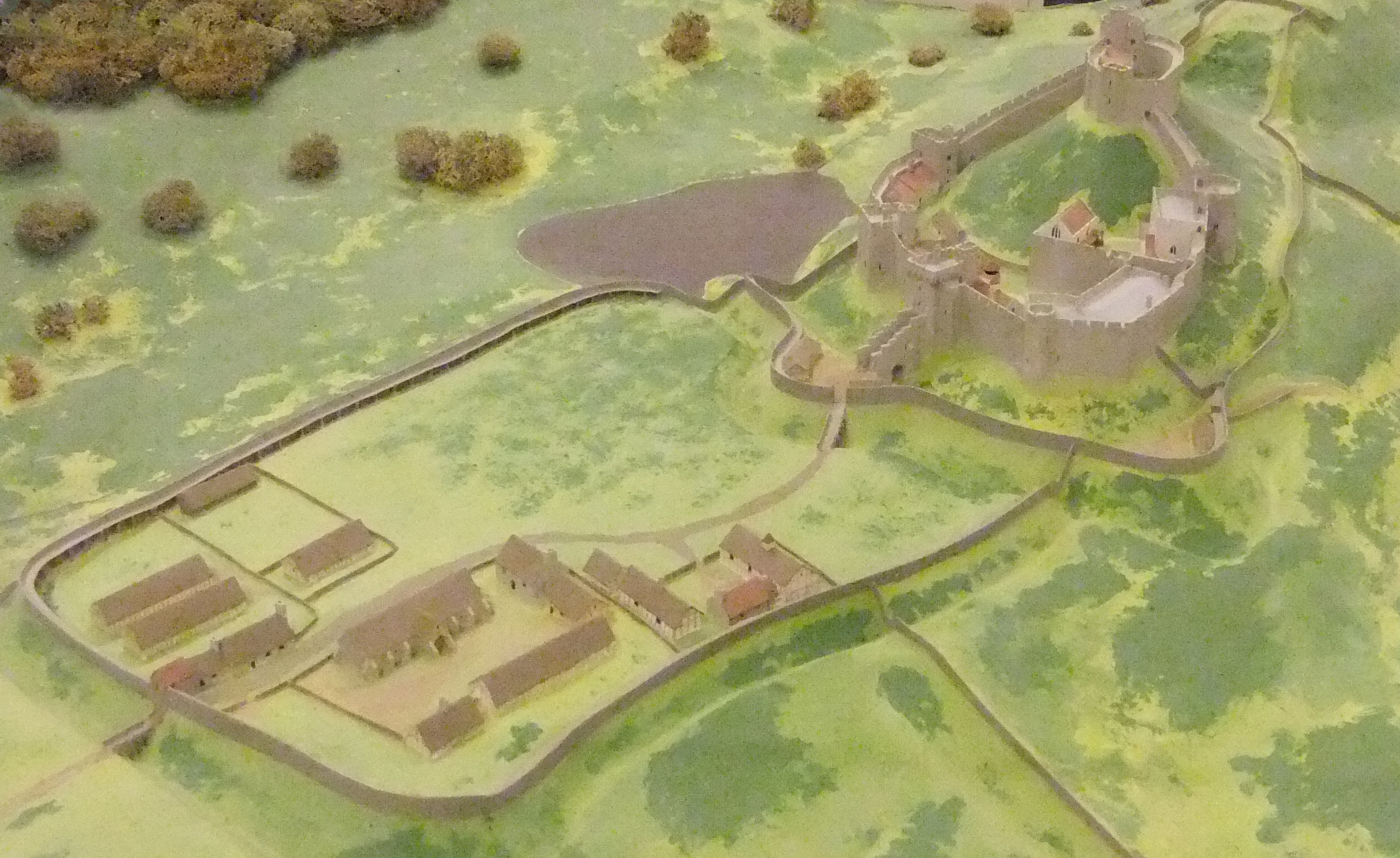
Reconstruction of Wigmore Castle

FitzOsbern was killed in Flanders in 1071, and his son Roger de Breteuil took part in the Revolt of the Earls in 1075; after the Earls' subsequent defeat, William I seized the castle and gave it to another of his supporters, Ranulph de Mortimer (or Ralph de Mortimer). From this time on Wigmore became the head of the barony of the Mortimers, later from 1328 Earls of March.

In 1155 the castle was besieged by Henry II because Hugh de Mortimer refused to return Bridgnorth Castle to the crown. Two small earthworks to the east and west of the castle have survived to the present day, and may represent siege-works built for the campaign.

Parts of the walls were built or rebuilt in stone in the late 12th century or early 13th century, and further work was carried out in the 13th century, perhaps when Hugh de Mortimer (1197-1227) was given Royal money for the castle's garrisoning. The works included the curtain wall that surrounds the bailey; it still stands to this day at its full height on the east side and the south side between the south tower and the gatehouse.

The castle was the subject of extensive works in the late 13th or early 14th century, when it was held by Roger Mortimer (1231-1282), Edmund Mortimer (1282-1304) and Roger Mortimer, 1st Earl of March (lived 1287–1330). The walls were raised, the gatehouse remodelled and other buildings were constructed on the site, including a substantial block, possibly a lodgings range, within the inner bailey.

Roger had succeeded his father Edmund in 1304, and strengthened the position of the Mortimer family considerably, acquiring Ludlow Castle and many lands in Ireland through marriage to the heiress Joan de Geneville. Roger was a leader of the party opposed to Edward II in the 1320s, and c.1325 became the lover of Edward's queen, Isabella of France. Following Edward's deposition and death in 1327, Mortimer, as the queen's lover and the effective stepfather of the young King Edward III, became the most important man in the kingdom. In 1328 Mortimer held a tournament near Wigmore, attended by the young king and almost all the magnates of England.

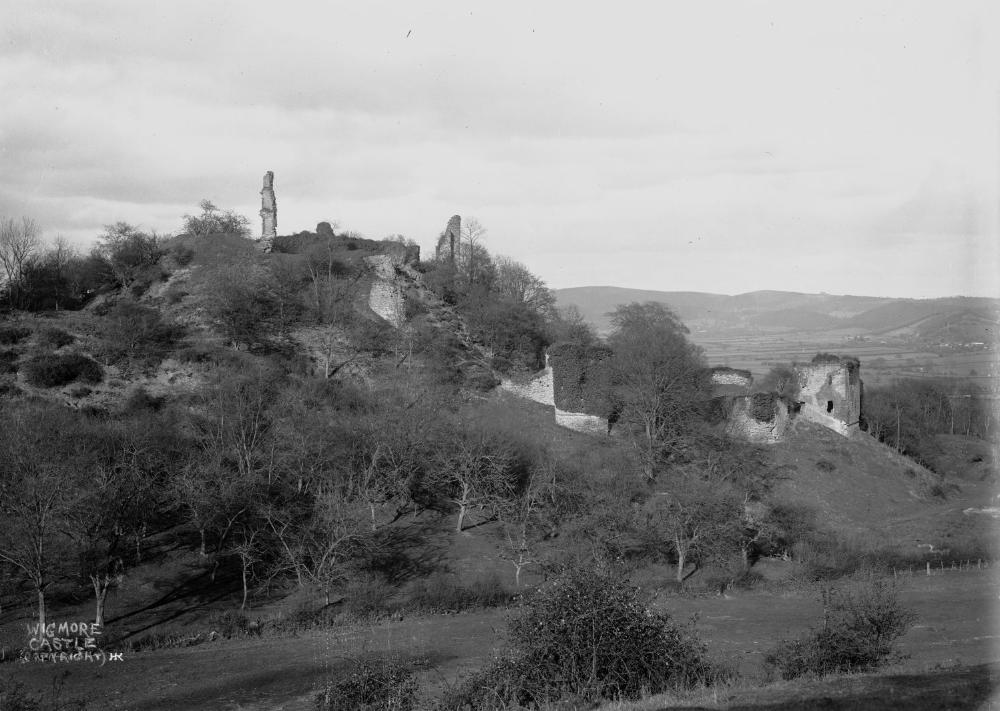
Wigmore castle c.1910

Roger de Mortimer was executed in 1330 by Edward III, and his lands seized by the crown. Edward III spent several weeks at Wigmore in the summer of 1332. Mortimer's grandson (also named Roger) regained Wigmore and the rest of his lands in 1342. His own son Edmund married Edward III's granddaughter Phillipa. In 1381 their son, Roger, inherited at the age of six and was declared the heir presumptive should Richard II (Phillipa's cousin) die childless.

Roger de Mortimer was killed in battle in Ireland in 1398 and when the male line of the Mortimers died out in 1424, the castle passed to Richard Plantagenet, 3rd Duke of York through his mother Anne Mortimer, sister of the last Roger Mortimer.

Wigmore castle is said to have been derelict in 1425, but archaeological excavations suggest that building work was carried out there in the mid 15th century. Richard's son Edward, Earl of March was almost certainly based at Wigmore Castle before his victory at the Battle of Mortimer's Cross in 1461. He deposed Henry VI and was crowned as Edward IV that year.

Throughout the 16th century the castle was managed by the Council of the Marches, partly as a prison, although the castle was already beginning to decay again. John Dee saw the records of Wigmore Abbey in an old decayed chapel within the castle in 1574. In 1595 it was given to Sir Gelli Meyrick. In 1601, after Meyrick was executed as a traitor, Elizabeth I sold Wigmore Castle to Thomas Harley of Brampton Bryan. His son, Sir Robert Harley, a Puritan and Parliamentarian, later inherited the castle. During the English Civil War Harley left the castle in charge of his wife, Lady Brilliana Harley, who had the castle's defences dismantled in order to prevent the Royalists using it against her.

After the Civil War, the castle was left in a state of ruin, and was gradually covered in trees and other vegetation. By the 20th century neglect and the growth of vegetation had left the remains of the castle as a scattering of ruins with features such as towers, curtain walls and the gatehouse almost indiscernible.

Unusually, because it remained in private hands, Wigmore was not subject to the large scale clearances carried out at most other major historic sites in the late 19th and early 20th centuries.

In 1995 Wigmore Castle came into the guardianship of English Heritage, which carried out some conservation work and small-scale excavation, making the site a little more accessible to visitors. Additional site presentation panels were installed in 2008.

== Structure and topography ==
The castle was of great strategic importance as it lies almost halfway between the rivers Teme and Lugg (about 4 km from each) and commands the wide area between them.

Wigmore Castle itself straddles the south-eastern edge of a spur, with marshland (since drained) to its north. The defences of the castle were further strengthened by the construction of ditches across the spur, between which the castle was built. These ditches acted as moats with the north-western one running past a mound, which was also fortified. This fortification was originally probably a wooden palisade, but later a stone keep was constructed in its place.

== See also ==
- Castles in Great Britain and Ireland
- List of castles in England
