= Myra Mortimer =

American singer

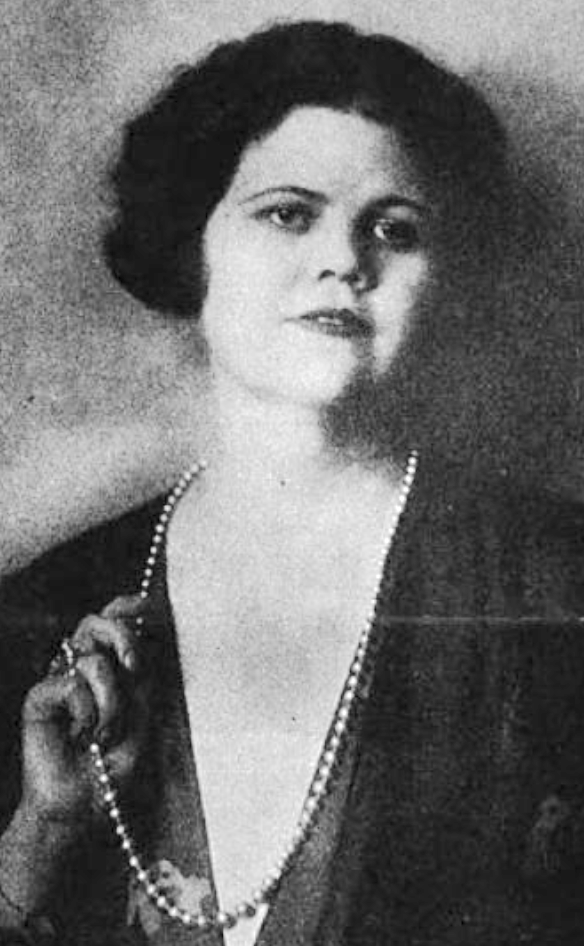
- Myra Mortimer, from a 1927 publication
- Born: March 26, 1894; Spokane, Washington, U.S.
- Died: January 29, 1972 (aged 77); New York, New York, U.S.
- Other names: Myra Mortimer Pinter
- Occupation: Contralto singer

Myra Mortimer (March 26, 1894 – January 29, 1972) was an American contralto singer with an international career in the 1920s.

== Early life and education ==
Mortimer was born in Spokane, Washington and raised in Butte, Montana, the daughter of Daniel Mortimer and Dora Angie Munson Mortimer. Her father was a journalist. She initially trained as a pianist in Cleveland, but a hand injury turned her attention to singing.

== Career ==
Mortimer was a contralto who specialized in German lieder. She toured in Europe in 1925. In January 1926, she made her American debut in Boston. She sang in Los Angeles, Spokane and Tacoma in March 1926.

Mortimer toured again in Europe in 1927, and gave recitals at Town Hall and Carnegie Hall. The New York Times described Mortimer's voice as "one of dramatic capabilities, range and power, with lighter lyric moments." She was a soloist with the Los Angeles Philharmonic in the 1927–1928 season. She sang with the Cincinnati Symphony Orchestra and in Bridgeport, Connecticut, before returning to Europe for most of 1928.

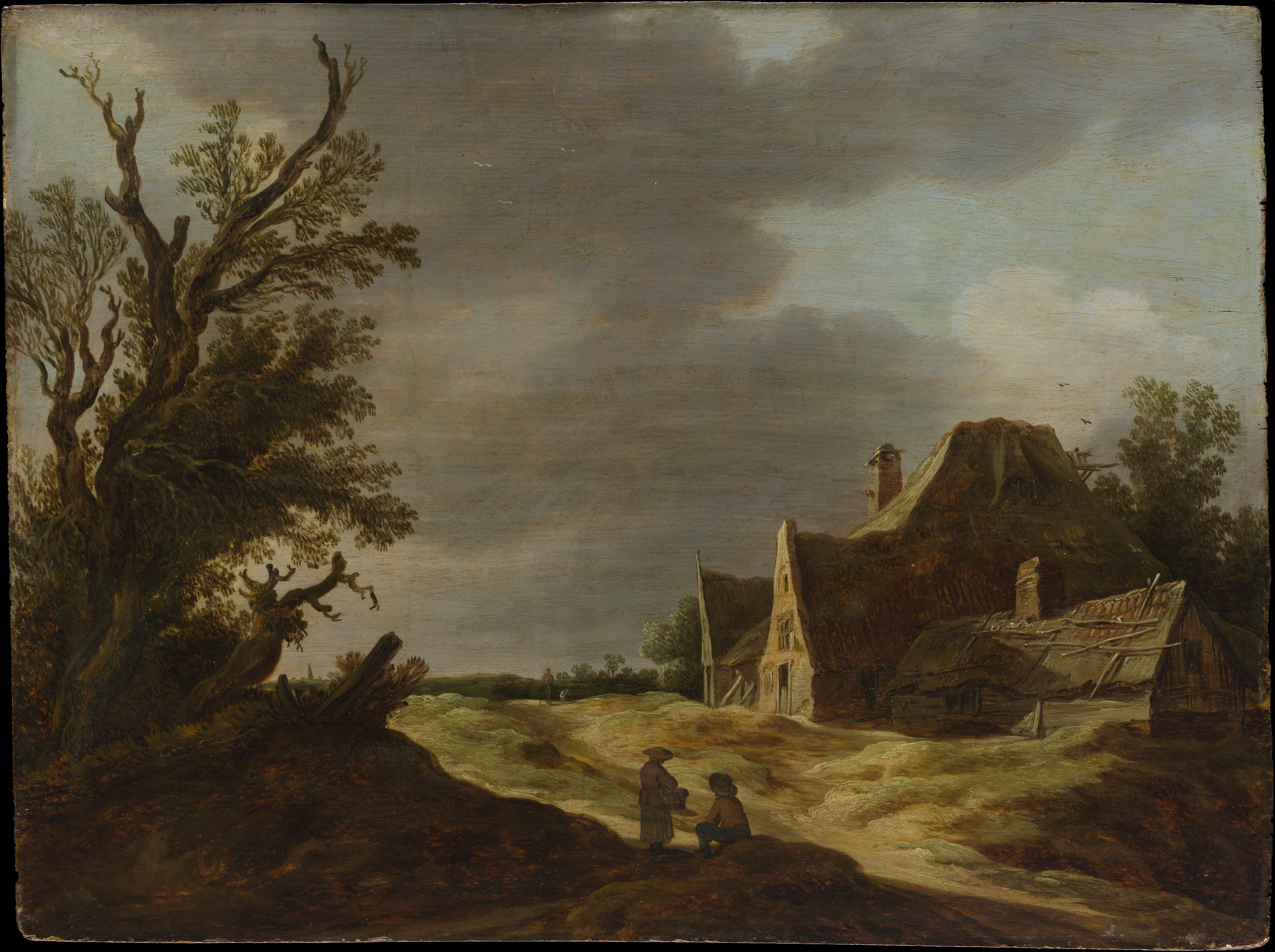
Jan van Goyen. "Sandy Road with a Farmhouse" (MET, 1972.25), a Dutch painting donated by Myra Mortimer Pinter to the Metropolitan Museum of Art

Mortimer lived and taught voice in London through the 1930s. She volunteered for air raid warden service in New York City in 1941.

== Publications ==
- "Analyzing Audiences in Many Lands" (1927)

== Personal life ==
Mortimer was nearly six feet tall. She married her instructor, Willem Giesen, in 1925, in London. She married Austrian businessman Frederick R. Pinter in 1932, also in London. She died in 1972, at the age of 77, in New York City.
