= Wigmore Hall, Herefordshire =

House in Wigmore, Herefordshire, England

Coordinates: 52.3138°N 2.8594°W

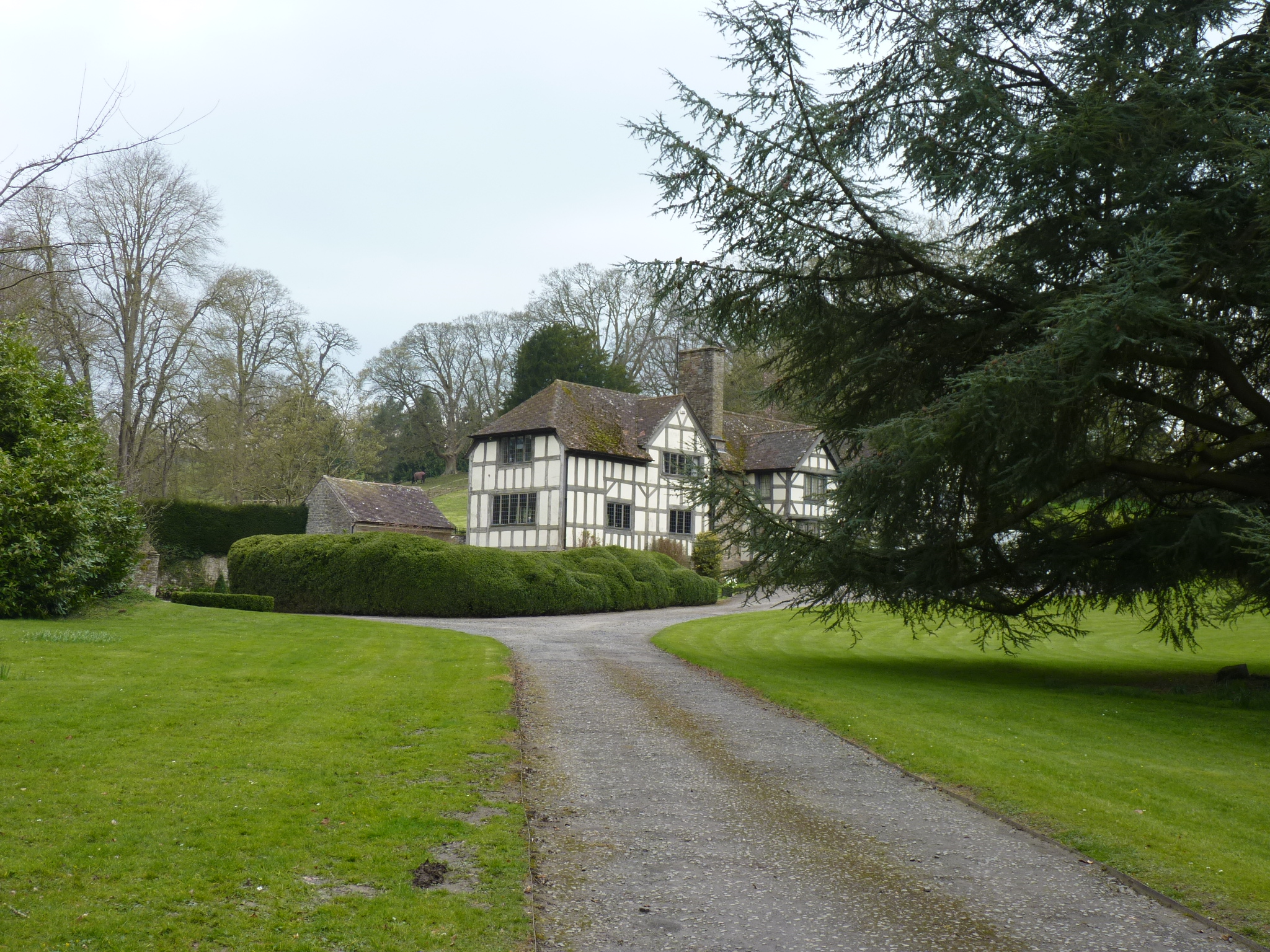
Wigmore Hall (pictured in 2016)

Wigmore Hall is a Grade II listed building in the village of Wigmore in Herefordshire, England.

== History ==
Originally built in the 16th century, Wigmore Hall was altered and extended in the 18th century before being restored in the mid to late 20th century.

It received its listing on the 11th June, 1959.

== Residents ==
- Col. Marcus Evans
- Matthew Bourne
- Maj. Henry Cecil Akroyd
- C.J.C. Prescott esq.
- Somerset Davies MP
