= Lisors =

- Commune
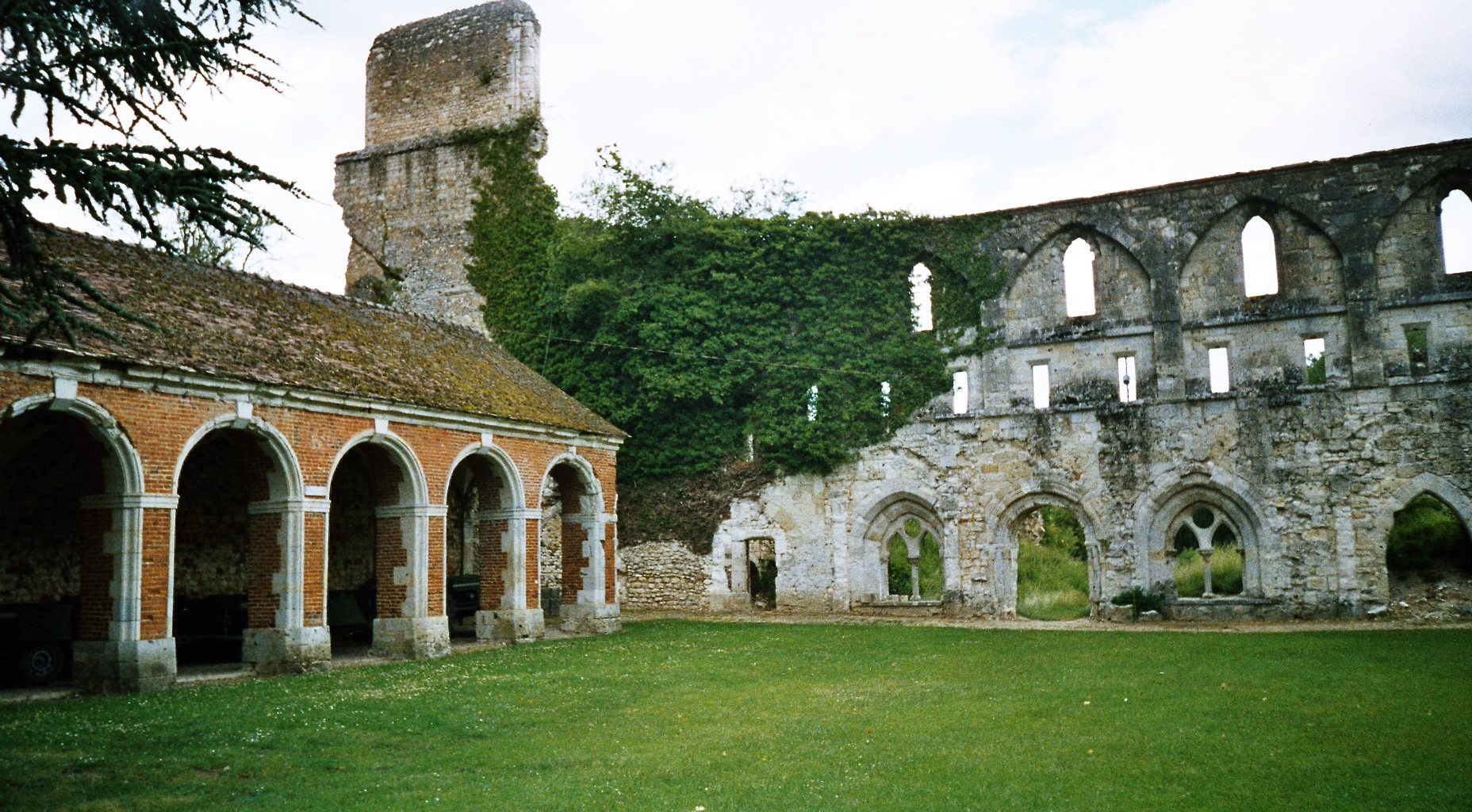
- Ruins of Mortemer Abbey

- Coat of arms
- Location of Lisors
- Location within France Location within Normandy
- Coordinates: 49°21′11″N 1°28′16″E
- Country: France
- Region: Normandy
- Department: Eure
- Arrondissement: Les Andelys
- Canton: Romilly-sur-Andelle

Government
  - Mayor (2020–2026): Frédéric Herbin
- Area^{1}: 10.75 km^{2} (4.15 sq mi)
- Elevation: 99 m (325 ft)
- Highest elevation: 178 m (584 ft)
- Lowest elevation: 62 m (203 ft)
- Population (2023): 290
  - Density: 27/km^{2} (70/sq mi)
- Time zone: UTC+01:00 (CET)
  - Summer (DST): UTC+02:00 (CEST)
- INSEE/Postal code: 27370 /27440
- ^{1} French Land Register data, which excludes lakes, ponds, glaciers > 1 km^{2} (0.386 sq mi or 247 acres) and river estuaries.

Lisors (French pronunciation: [lizɔʁ]) is a commune in the Eure department in Normandy in northern France.

Mortemer Abbey is located on the territory of the commune.

== Population ==
Historical population
Year	Pop.	±% p.a.
1968	250	—
1975	265	+0.84%
1982	264	−0.05%
1990	274	+0.47%
1999	332	+2.16%
2007	364	+1.16%
2012	347	−0.95%
2017	350	+0.17%
2023	290	−3.09%
Source: INSEE

== Economy and Infrastructure ==
There is a public primary school and a butchery in Lisors. The closest train station is 28 km away at Gaillon.

== See also ==
- Communes of the Eure department
