= Wigmore, Herefordshire =

Village in Herefordshire, England

Coordinates: 52.3164°N 2.8612°W

Wigmore
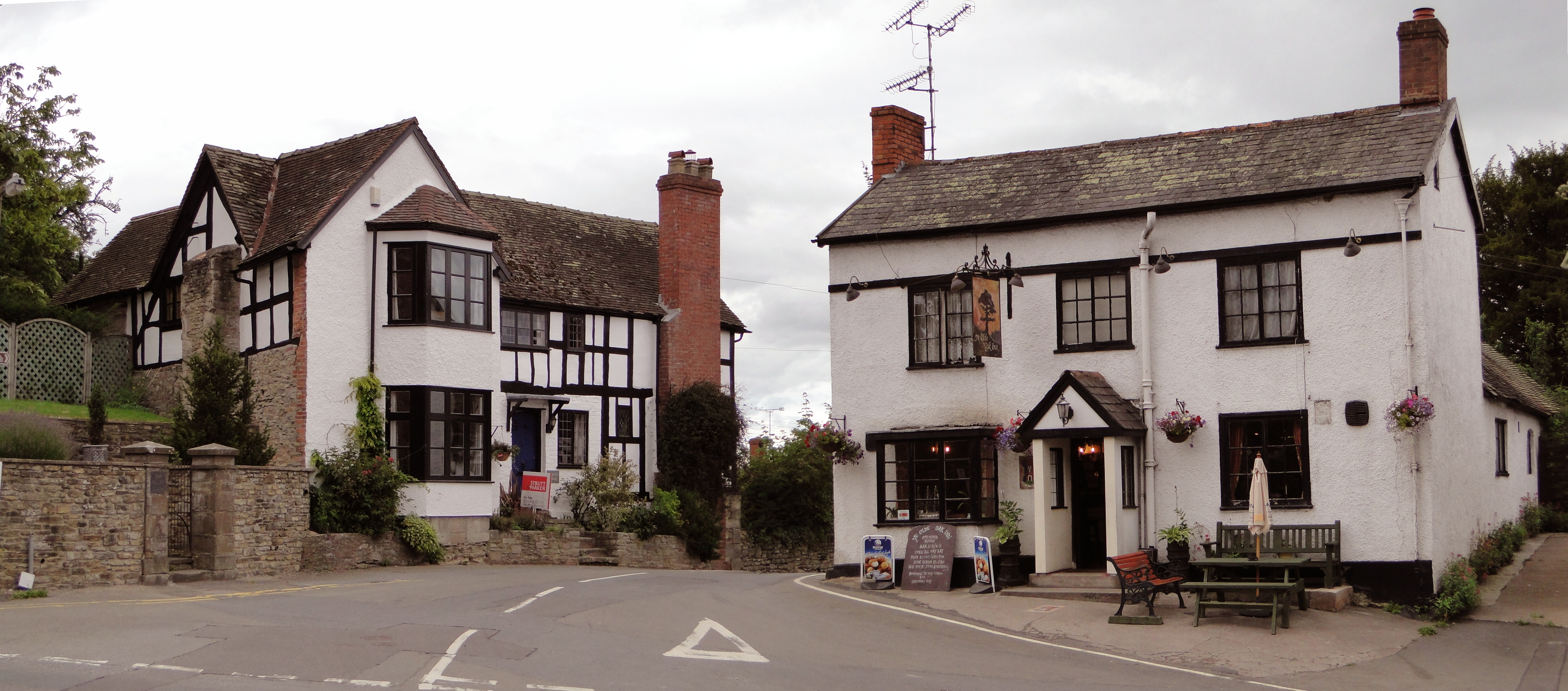
- Wigmore village

- Location within Herefordshire
- Population: 757 (2011)
- OS grid reference: SO407693
- Unitary authority: Herefordshire
- Ceremonial county: Herefordshire
- Region: West Midlands
- Country: England
- Sovereign state: United Kingdom
- Post town: LEOMINSTER
- Postcode district: HR6
- Dialling code: 01568
- Police: West Mercia
- Fire: Hereford and Worcester
- Ambulance: West Midlands
- UK Parliament: North Herefordshire

Wigmore is a village and civil parish in the Northwest of Herefordshire county, England. It is located on the A4110 road, about 8 miles (13 km) west of the town of Ludlow, in the Welsh Marches. In earlier times, it was also an administrative district, called a hundred.

== Name ==
The placename is attested as Wigemore (1086), Wiggemora (1165), from an Old English *wicga-mōr, the element wicga ("insect") likely denoting the yielding quality of the moorland, thus "quaking marsh" or similar.

Wigmore has usually been identified as the Wigingamere of the Anglo-Saxon Chronicle (s.a. 917, 921) in 19th century scholarship, but Wigingamere is now known to have been in Newport, Essex. The misidentification goes back to Edward Lye, who recorded a Wicinga-mere (introducing an association with Vikings) as a villa in agro Herefordiensi.

== History ==
=== Early history ===
An early settlement on a hill close by the location of the present village seems to have been called Merestone or Merestun (from the Old English Mersc, meaning mere or marsh and Tūn, meaning enclosure, farmstead, village, manor or estate - thus literally "village by the marsh"). The name of the marsh itself seems to have been applied to the later village.

Although Roman remains have been found in the area (near Bury Farm, to the east) on the western branch of Watling Street (which crosses Wigmore Moor). Wigmore Church is an Anglo-Saxon foundation, with substantial surviving wall portions dating to the 10th century.

=== The Mortimer period ===
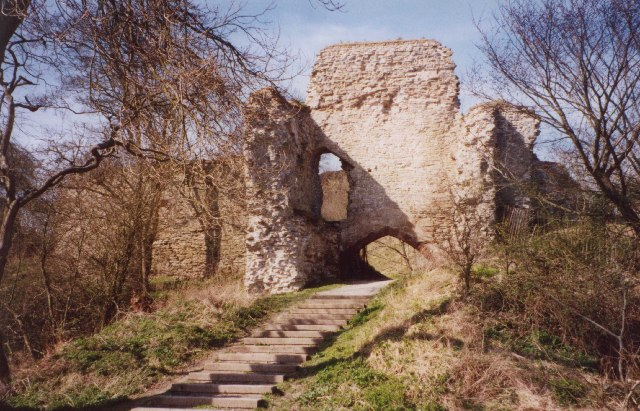
Ruins of Wigmore Castle

At the time of the reign of Edward the Confessor, the barony of Wigmore belonged to Edric Sylvaticus, the English thegn. However, he refused to submit after the Norman Conquest and was defeated in battle and taken prisoner. His possessions were subsequently granted to the Norman William FitzOsbern, the Earl of Hereford under William I from 1068 to 1072, as a reward for his services.

FitzOsbern built Wigmore Castle, as it became known. Although it was probably initially only built of earth and timber, it was to become one of the main English border castles along the Welsh Marches during the thirteenth and fourteenth centuries.

However, FitzOsbern's son Roger de Breteuil took part in the Revolt of the Earls; after the Earl's subsequent defeat William I seized the castle and gave it to another of his supporters, Ranulph de Mortimer. From this time on Wigmore became the head of the barony of the Mortimers, Earls of March.

Wigmore is one of very few Herefordshire boroughs recorded in the Domesday Book of 1086. Although Hereford was the only borough in the county in 1066, boroughs were attached to the castles of Clifford (also built by FitzOsbern) and Wigmore by 1086.

Wigmore, at the time situated in the Hazeltree hundred, is mentioned three times in the Domesday Book. The first entry is under the lands held by Ranulph Mortimer and records that he holds Wigmore Castle, which Earl William built on wasteland that was called Merestun, which Gunfrid held before 1066. It also records that there were two hides that paid tax, two ploughs in lordship and four slaves. The borough of Wigmore is recorded to have paid £ 7 - "bergu qd ibi est redd vii lib". Secondly, in the section recording the lands of the king, Merestone is recorded as being a part of the manor of Kingsland which Ranulph Mortimer held for the king. A third section mentions that Ranulph Mortimer holds Wigmore, which Alfward held, and that there is half a hide, which Wigmore Castle is situated upon. If a rental of 12 d per burgage (as was customary with other rental properties at the time), the money paid by the borough may represent about 140 burgages.

Although it is not considered to have been a failed borough, as it was a fairly prosperous small market town during the thirteenth and early fourteenth centuries, Wigmore does not seem to have flourished as much as others in the region, such as Bromyard.

There are two 14th-century extents (assessments or valuations of land for taxation purposes) preserved in the Public Record Office which include the settlement. In the one of 1304 it was recorded that there were 102 tenants who held 140 and a quarter burgages. It was also recorded that there was a weekly market and a fair, which was held on the feast of St Andrew.

The importance of Wigmore as a market town was at least partly due to the influence of the Mortimer family and their castle, which probably attracted much local and regional business to the town. However, Wigmore's prosperity probably waned somewhat in the mid-14th century when the Mortimer family moved its administrative centre to Ludlow Castle, which they had inherited through marriage in 1314.

However, Wigmore Castle still remained the family's official seat for the next 250 years, until the demise of their house; when the male line of the Mortimers died out in 1424, the castle passed to the crown. It was maintained throughout the sixteenth century, partly as a prison, although the castle was already in decay. The town of Wigmore shared the fate of the castle and it declined to village status by the 16th century. The castle was finally dismantled in 1643 to prevent it being garrisoned during the English Civil War.

=== Modern history ===
Wigmore Inclosure Act 1772
- Act of Parliament
- Parliament of Great Britain
- Long title: An Act for enclosing, dividing, allotting, and improving, certain Common Woods and Moor Lands, within the Borough and Parish of Wigmore, in the County of Hereford.
- Citation: 12 Geo. 3. c. 137 Pr.
- Territorial extent: Great Britain

Dates
- Royal assent: 3 June 1772
- Commencement: 21 January 1772 (Note: Start of session.)

Status: Current legislation

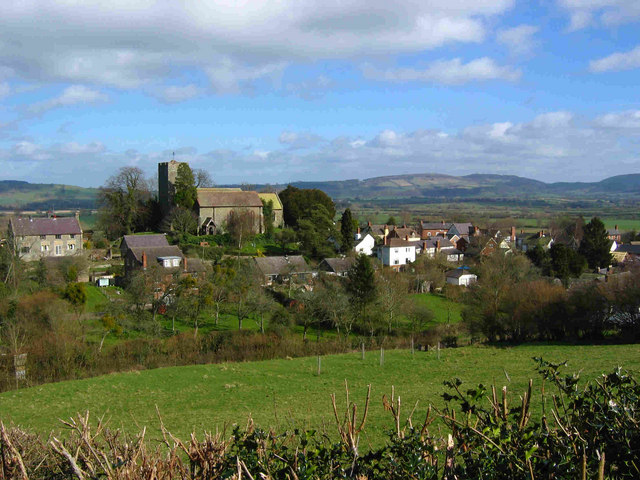
Wigmore Church and Village

Wigmore was one of the first areas in England to have an inclosure act. The Wigmore Inclosure Act 1772 (12 Geo. 3. c. 137 Pr.) affected the moor and woods nearby. The dividing earth banks still survive.

In 1870–1872 it was recorded in the Imperial Gazetteer of England and Wales that Wigmore village was a seat of petty-sessions and that it had a post office, a police station, two Methodist chapels and a national school. Fairs were held on 6 May and 5 August. The parish included part of Limebrook and was in the Ludlow district. The size of the village was 3,441 acres (13.93 km^{2}), it had a population of 499 and 104 houses. Regarding the Wigmore hundred, it was recorded that it contained 14 parishes and 5 parts. It had a size of 47,075 acres (190.51 km^{2}), a population of 6,309 and contained 1,234 houses.

The Gazetteer of the British Isles of 1887 showed that the village of Wigmore had not changed much in fifteen years – the number of inhabitants had declined slightly: 3,441 acres (13.93 km^{2}) contained a population of 417. Similarly, the Wigmore hundred's 46,354 acres (187.59 km^{2}) contained a population of 5,665.

== Schools ==
The village has one primary school and one secondary school (Wigmore High School) which became a federated school in 2007. The school has a catchment area of North Herefordshire although some pupils attend from southern Shropshire and from across the border in Wales.

== Places of interest ==
- Wigmore Abbey, an Augustinian abbey and grange about a mile (2 km) north of Wigmore was founded by Ranulph de Mortimer and his son, Hugh de Mortimer in 1179. In the abbey church many of the Mortimers were buried, among them five holders of the title Earl of March. The abbey continued to flourish until the period of the dissolution of the monasteries, when it was destroyed.
- Wigmore Hall, 16th century house.
- St James' Church is also a landmark in the village and surrounding areas, as it stands on the pinnacle of a hill overlooking the village. It was built as a collegiate church in the 11th century by the Mortimer family and lies on the site of an earlier Saxon building. The church has a very early Norman nave and herringbone opus spicatum masonry is still visible on the outside of the north wall. Little, apart from detail, has been added to the church since the 1330s.
- Another place of interest is Leintwardine the Roman Fort Bravonium which is found 2 miles from Wigmore.
