= Mortemer Abbey =

Abbey in France

Coordinates: 49.3696°N 1.4807°E

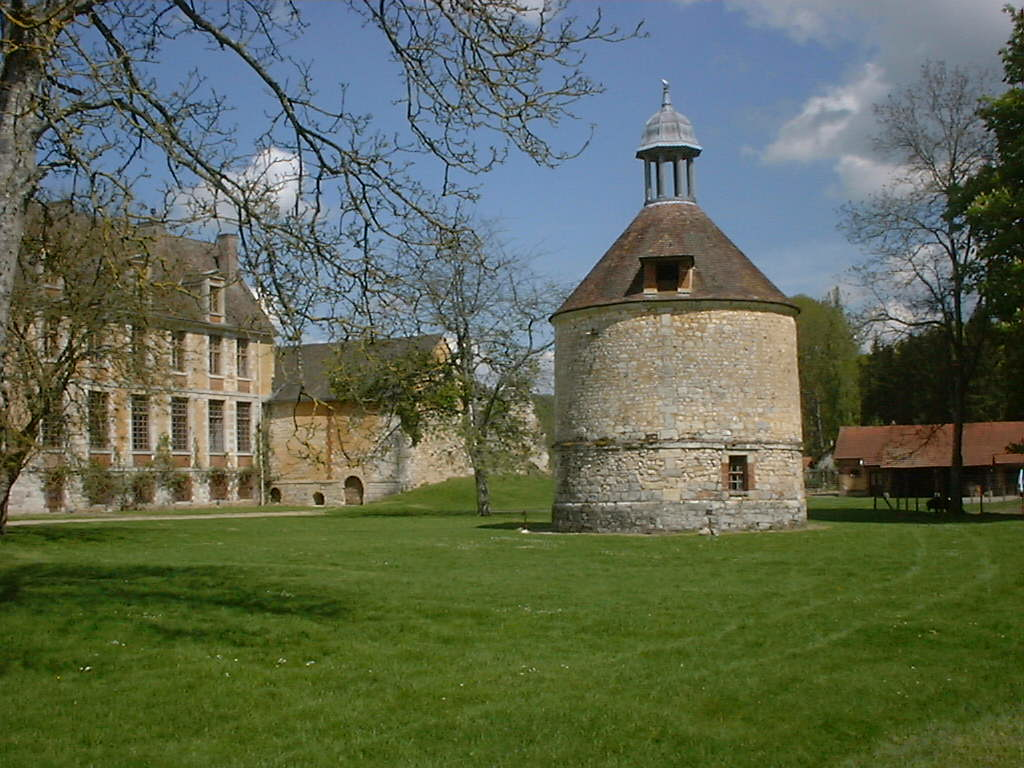
The 15th - 17th Century Abbey and Dovecote

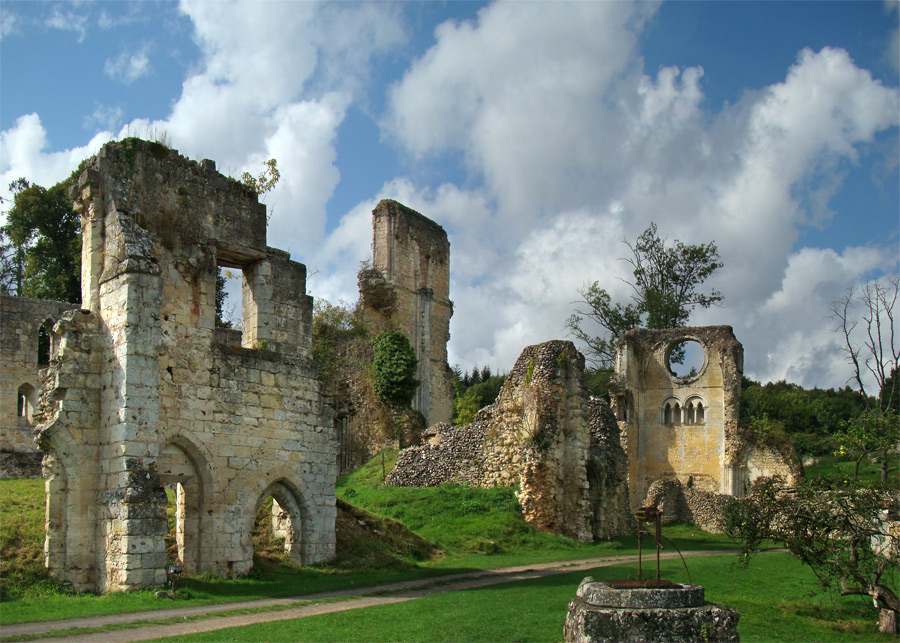

Mortemer Abbey (French: L'Abbaye de Mortemer, pronounced [labei də mɔʁtəmɛʁ]) is a former Cistercian monastery in the Forest of Lyons between the present Lyons-la-Forêt and Lisors, some 34 km (21 mi) southeast of Rouen in the department of Eure. It is located on the territory of the commune of Lisors.

== History ==
It was originally built in 1134 on land presented as a gift to the Cistercians by Henry I of England. The stagnant water of the drainage lake, dug out by the monks to dry up the marshy land around the quick-running Fouillebroc stream, was called the "dead pond" - in French "morte mare" - and gave the monastery its name. The monks constructed what was then one of the largest Cistercian monastery in the world.

Over the centuries, the abbey fell into decline and disrepair. It was rebuilt in the 17th century, but the decline was irreversible and by 1790, when it was dissolved in the course of the French Revolution, only five monks remained.

== Buildings ==
The 12th-century buildings were already more or less derelict by the time of the French Revolution, and subsequent use as a convenient source of cut stone for local construction reduced them to little more than a ruin. Apart from the cloisters, which are relatively intact, there remains only a shell.

The 17th-century buildings by contrast are well preserved and open to visitors, with guided tours available most of the year.

The abbey site also has a well-maintained 17th-century dovecote, which was also used as a gaol house in the 18th and 19th centuries.

== Legends ==
There are a number of legends and ghost stories relating to the abbey. Matilda of England was forced by her father Henry I to stay in a room in the abbey for 5 years. After her death in Rouen, she is said to have come back to haunt the place. Her ghost is known as The White Lady. Visitors to the abbey have reported hearing strange noises and feeling a strange presence.

Four monks were murdered during the French Revolution and their ghosts are also said to haunt the abbey. If you meet a cat in the ruins, it is alleged to be a Goblin cat (Norman: eul cat goublin), guarding the treasure of the abbey. There are a number of other legends, giving the abbey the nickname of as most haunted abbey in France.
