= Battle of Mortemer =

Battle in 1054 between the Normans and the French

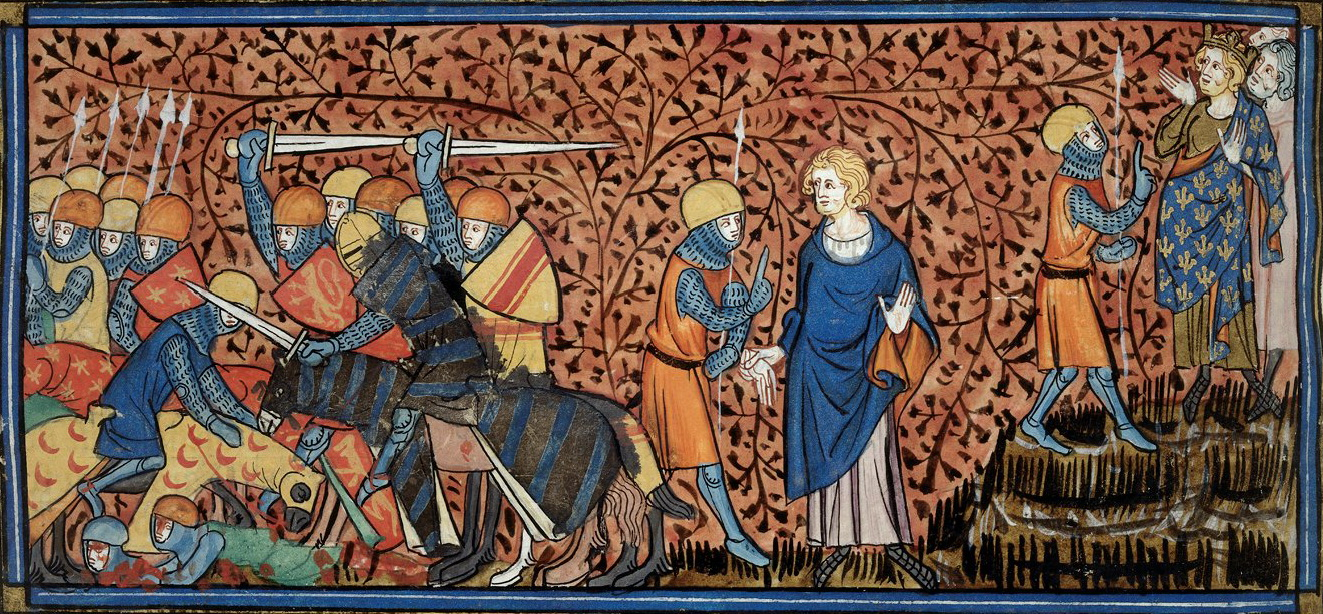
- Depiction of the battle from a 14th Century parchment
Date	1054
Location	Mortemer, Normandy 49°44′53″N 1°33′11″E
Result	Norman victory

Belligerents
Kingdom of France	Duchy of Normandy

Commanders and leaders
Odo of France (POW); Renaud, Count of Clermont; Guy, Count of Ponthieu (POW); Waleran of Ponthieu †	Robert, Count of Eu; Hugh of Gournay; Walter Giffard; Roger of Mortemer; William de Warenne
- Location within Normandy Battle of Mortemer (France)

The Battle of Mortemer was a defeat for Henry I of France when he led an army against his vassal, William the Bastard, Duke of Normandy (Note: William was regularly described as bastardus (bastard) in non-Norman contemporary sources. He was the illegitimate son of Richard II, Duke of Normandy.) in 1054. William was eventually to become known as William the Conqueror after his successful invasion and conquest of England.

== Background ==
William the Bastard became Duke of Normandy as a boy. His reign did not start well, and he had to experience twenty years of internal strife. The chronicler William of Jumièges reported that the duke's guardian, his teacher and his steward were all killed by rebels. Members of William's extended family attempted to unseat him. In 1046 there was a rebellion led by Guy of Burgundy, William's cousin. William defeated the rebels at the Battle of Val-ès-Dunes in 1047, with the support of Henry I of France.

== The battle ==
The French king had supported William at the Battle of Val-ès-Dunes, but in 1052 he decided to oppose William and led an alliance of French magnates against him. A large force under Odo, brother to the king, came from north-eastern France along with troops under Renaud, Count of Clermont, and Guy, Count of Ponthieu. This second force entered Eastern Normandy and began widespread devastation.

While Duke William confronted the French king to the west of the Seine River, an allied force of Norman barons led by Robert, Count of Eu, Hugh of Gournay, Walter Giffard, Roger of Mortemer, and the young William de Warenne came out of their own lands to stop the incursion by Count Odo and Count Rainald.

The French force was widely scattered in its depredations of rape and pillage in the Norman lands and was an easy target for the Norman forces of Robert, Count of Eu. The fierce engagement lasted many hours, but the French left with heavy losses. Guy, Count of Ponthieu, was captured during the course of the battle, as was the father of Guibert of Nogent, while Waleran of Ponthieu, brother of Guy I, the Count of Ponthieu was killed.

All these events were viewed by the French king from his vantage point on Bassenbourg Hill just across the river. He withdrew the remainder of his forces in "dismay" and never invaded Normandy again.

After the defeats of 1052–1054 the rebellious Norman lords were exiled, the Norman lands of the Counts of Pointhieu were confiscated, and Guy, Count of Ponthieu swore homage to William after two years' imprisonment.
