= Mortemer, Seine-Maritime =

Mortemer
- Commune
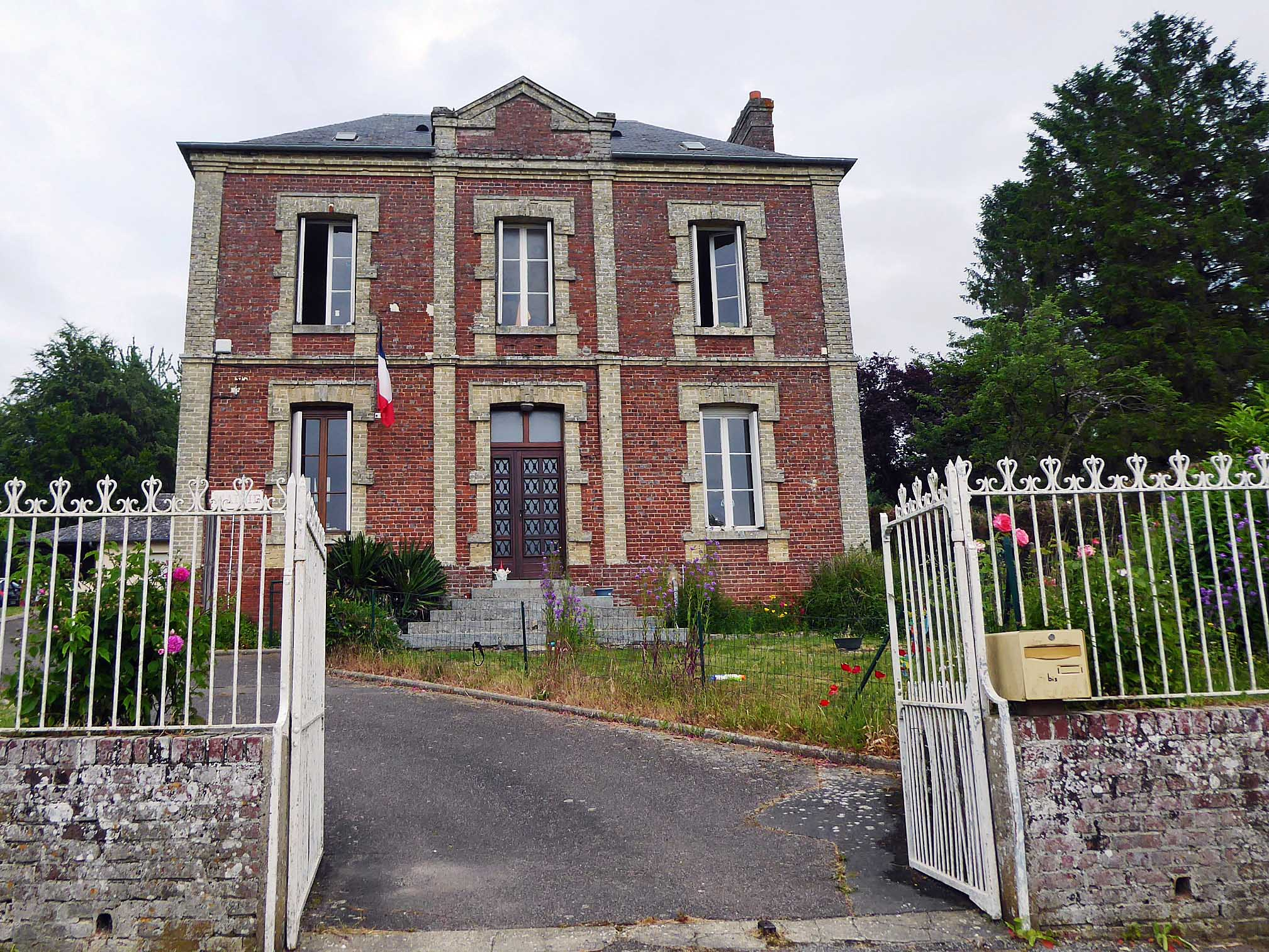
- Mortemer Town hall
- Location of Mortemer
- Location within France Location within Normandy
- Coordinates: 49°45′06″N 1°33′04″E
- Country: France
- Region: Normandy
- Department: Seine-Maritime
- Arrondissement: Dieppe
- Canton: Neufchâtel-en-Bray
- Intercommunality: CC Bray-Eawy

Government
  - Mayor (2020–2026): Daniel Van Hulle
- Area^{1}: 8.94 km^{2} (3.45 sq mi)
- Elevation: 151 m (495 ft)
- Highest elevation: 230 m (750 ft)
- Lowest elevation: 128 m (420 ft)
- Population (2023): 94
  - Density: 11/km^{2} (27/sq mi)
- Time zone: UTC+01:00 (CET)
  - Summer (DST): UTC+02:00 (CEST)
- INSEE/Postal code: 76454 /76270
- ^{1} French Land Register data, which excludes lakes, ponds, glaciers > 1 km^{2} (0.386 sq mi or 247 acres) and river estuaries.

Mortemer is a commune in the Seine-Maritime department in the Normandy region in northern France.

== Geography ==
Mortemer is a small forestry and farming village situated in the valley of the river Eaulne in the Pays de Bray, some 23 miles (37 km) southeast of Dieppe at the junction of the D7, D36 and the D929 roads. The A29 autoroute passes through the territory of the commune.

== History ==
It was the site of the battle of Mortemer in February 1054 and was a defeat for Henry I of France when he led an army against his vassal, William the Bastard, Duke of Normandy in 1054.

This village is possibly the source of the medieval family name of Mortimer. The nature of the family's relations confused Robert of Torigni, one of the authors of the Gesta Normannorum Ducum. He claims that Roger of Mortemer was the brother of "William, later to be Earl of Surrey". But possibly Robert missed out a generation, as he did in dealing with the family history of the Montgomerys.

== Population ==
Historical population
Year	Pop.	±% p.a.
1968	139	—
1975	110	−3.29%
1982	124	+1.73%
1990	121	−0.31%
1999	107	−1.36%
2007	108	+0.12%
2012	96	−2.33%
2017	83	−2.87%
2023	94	+2.10%
Source: INSEE

== Places of interest ==
- The church of St. Martin, dating from the eighteenth century.
- Ruins of a twelfth-century Cistercian abbey.
- Ruins of the donjon of the twelfth-century castle.

== See also ==
- Communes of the Seine-Maritime department
