= Saint-Victor-l'Abbaye =

- Commune
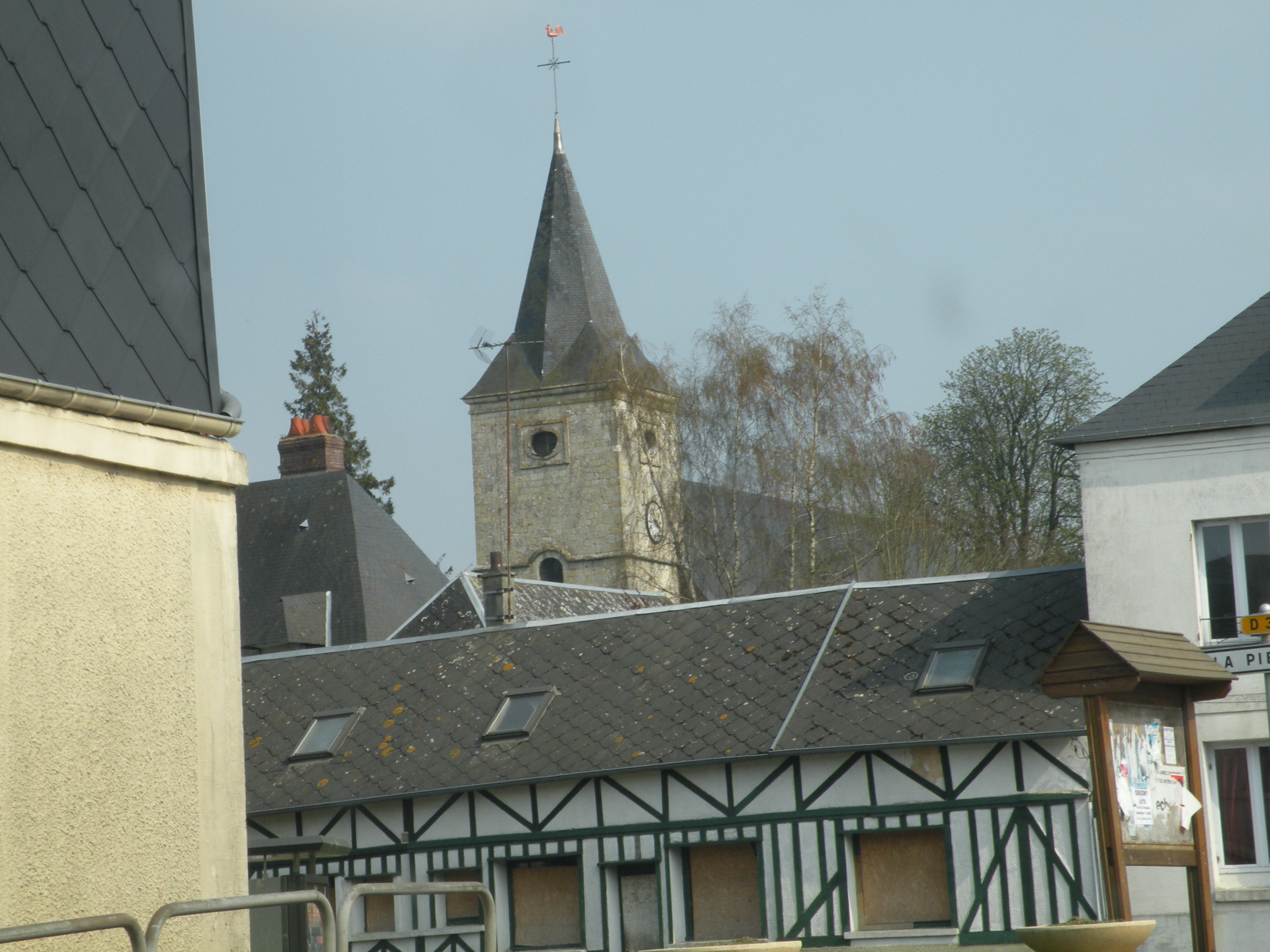
- Belltower from Saint-Victor
- Location of Saint-Victor-l'Abbaye
- Location within France Location within Normandy
- Coordinates: 49°40′29″N 1°07′16″E
- Country: France
- Region: Normandy
- Department: Seine-Maritime
- Arrondissement: Dieppe
- Canton: Luneray
- Intercommunality: CC Terroir de Caux

Government
  - Mayor (2020–2026): Jacques Lagnel
- Area^{1}: 8.43 km^{2} (3.25 sq mi)
- Elevation: 116 m (381 ft)
- Highest elevation: 166 m (545 ft)
- Lowest elevation: 115 m (377 ft)
- Population (2023): 745
  - Density: 88.4/km^{2} (229/sq mi)
- Time zone: UTC+01:00 (CET)
  - Summer (DST): UTC+02:00 (CEST)
- INSEE/Postal code: 76656 /76890
- ^{1} French Land Register data, which excludes lakes, ponds, glaciers > 1 km^{2} (0.386 sq mi or 247 acres) and river estuaries.

Saint-Victor-l'Abbaye (French pronunciation: [sɛ̃ viktɔʁ labei]) is a commune in the Seine-Maritime department in the Normandy region in north-western France.

== Geography ==
A farming village situated by the banks of the river Scie in the Pays de Caux, some 20 miles (32 km) south of Dieppe at the junction of the D 57, D 3 and D 929 roads. SNCF railways have a TER station here, connecting with Rouen and Dieppe.

== Population ==
Historical population

Year	Pop.	±% p.a.
1793	574	—
1821	538	−0.23%
1846	581	+0.31%
1872	570	−0.07%
1901	481	−0.58%
1926	502	+0.17%
1946	458	−0.46%
1962	537	+1.00%
1968	558	+0.64%

Year	Pop.	±% p.a.
1975	573	+0.38%
1982	575	+0.05%
1990	569	−0.13%
1999	624	+1.03%
2007	624	+0.00%
2012	737	+3.38%
2017	771	+0.91%
2023	745	−0.57%

Source: EHESS and INSEE (1968-2023)

== Places of interest ==
- The châteaux of St. Victor and Ménillet.
- Traces of a feudal castle.
- The church of St. Victor, dating from the thirteenth century.

== See also ==
- Communes of the Seine-Maritime department
