= List of places in Herefordshire =

Some of the larger settlements of Herefordshire.

This is a list of cities, towns and villages in the county of Herefordshire, England.

== A ==
- Abbey Dore (SO386305)
- Abcott (SO393788)
- Acton Beauchamp (SO678506)
- Acton Green (SO696504)
- Adforton (SO401710)
- Alder's End (SO622399)
- Allensmore (SO466354)
- Almeley (SO334512)
- Almeley Wooton (SO332521)
- Altbough (SO541303)
- Amberley (SO543473)
- Archenfield (SO261423)
- Arrow Green (SO433583)
- Ashfield (SO593239)
- Ashley Moor (SO475673)
- Ashperton (SO645413)
- Ashton (SO513646)
- Aston (SO466626)
- Aston (SO466716)
- Aston Crews (SO676235)
- Aston Ingham (SO685234)
- Auberrow (SO494474)
- Aulden (SO464547)
- Aylestone Hill (SO527405)
- Aylton (SO655372)
- Aymestrey (SO422653)

== B ==
- Bacton (SO371323)
- Bagwyllydiart (SO447264)
- Ballingham (SO574317)
- Ballingham Hill (SO577325)
- Bank Street (SO635625)
- Barland (SO285625)
- Barnfields (SO455423)
- Barons' Cross (SO473587)
- Bartestree (SO564413)
- Barton Court (SO744407)
- Bartonsham (SO517395)
- Batchcott (SO495705)
- Batchfields (SO655496)
- Baysham (SO576274)
- Bearwood (SO384567)
- Beavan's Hill (SO677245)
- Beggars Ash (SO704399)
- Berrow Green (SO749585)
- Bicton (SO465633)
- Birchall (SO653382)
- Birchend (SO662446)
- Bircher (SO476655)
- Birley (SO455534)
- Birtley (SO364699)
- Bishon Common (SO429435)
- Bishops Frome (SO662483)
- Bishopstone (SO415435)
- Blacklands (SO635425)
- Blackmarstone (SO505394)
- Blackwardine (SO529564)
- Blakemere (SO364404)
- Bleak Acre (SO604497)
- Bockleton (SO597615)
- Bodenham (SO535511)
- Bodenham Bank (SO641327)
- Bodenham Moor (SO547505)
- Bolstone (SO555329)
- Bosbury (SO699436)
- Bowley (SO546526)
- Bowley Lane (SO686434)
- Bowley Town (SO534534)
- Bradlow (SO711387)
- Bradnor Green (SO297575)
- Brampton Abbotts (SO605267)
- Brampton Bryan (SO377724)
- Brand Green (SO764418)
- Brandhill (SO428784)
- Bredenbury (SO604563)
- Bredwardine (SO333444)
- Breinton Common (SO454393)
- Brelston Green (SO563203)
- Bridge End (SO623462)
- Bridge Sollers (SO412423)
- Bridstow (SO583244)
- Brierley (SO494559)
- Brilley (SO269495)
- Brilley Mountain (SO265515)
- Brimfield (SO525678)
- Bringewood Forge (SO458745)
- Bringsty Common (SO705559)
- Brinkley Hill (SO589315)
- Brinsop (SO445448)
- Brinsop Common (SO438445)
- Broad Green (SO765554)
- Broad Heath (SO334639)
- Broad Oak (SO489215)
- Broadmoor Common (SO605365)
- Broadward (SO496571)
- Broadway Lands (SO557304)
- Brobury (SO345443)
- Brockhampton (SO593312)
- Brockmanton (SO542596)
- Bromsash (SO645243)
- Bromyard (SO653547)
- Bromyard Downs (SO666554)
- Bronydd (SO224453)
- Broome (SO403809)
- Broom's Green (SO719334)
- Broomy Hill (SO494394)
- Brown's End (SO744346)
- Broxwood (SO366545)
- Buckton (SO383733)
- Bullinghope (SO513373)
- Bull's Hill (SO593202)
- Burcher (SO332601)
- Burghill (SO471444)
- Burley Gate (SO594479)
- Burmash (SO534466)
- Burrington (SO446725)
- Bush Bank (SO455513)
- Bycross (SO373424)
- Byford (SO394429)
- Byford Common (SO389434)
- Byton (SO364637)
- Byton Hand (SO367635)

== C ==
- Callow (SO495341)
- Callow Hill (SO513166)
- Callow Marsh (SO657465)
- Calver Hill (SO375489)
- Canon Bridge (SO439414)
- Canon Frome (SO654437)
- Canon Pyon (SO457491)
- Carey (SO566314)
- Carterspiece (SO594149)
- Castle Frome (SO669455)
- Catley Southfield (SO685446)
- Chance's Pitch (SO744404)
- Chandler's Cross (SO774389)
- Chase End Street (SO769355)
- Checkley (SO595386)
- Chickward (SO286534)
- Cholstrey (SO464599)
- Churchfield (SO735466)
- Clehonger (SO456375)
- Clencher's Mill (SO735355)
- Clifford (SO245454)
- Clifton-upon-Teme (SO713617)
- Clock Mills (SO297454)
- Clodock (SO324274)
- Clouds (SO584383)
- Cobhall Common (SO452357)
- Cobnash (SO457605)
- Cock Gate (SO465655)
- Cockshoot (SO585383)
- Cockyard (SO413331)
- Coddington (SO711429)
- Collington (SO649604)
- Collins Green (SO734574)
- Colwall (SO739423)
- Colwall Green (SO755415)
- Colwall Stone (SO755424)
- Combe (SO347635)
- Combe Moor (SO365634)
- Comberton (SO494676)
- Common Hill (SO586346)
- Cornett (SO576494)
- Coughton (SO594213)
- Covender (SO623436)
- Coxall (SO376746)
- Cradley (SO736475)
- Craswell (SO295344)
- Credenhill (SO451436)
- Crick's Green (SO631518)
- Crizeley (SO448324)
- Crocker's Ash (SO534167)
- Croft (SO457654)
- Cross Llyde (SO424278)
- Crossway (SO448195)
- Crossway (SO615315)
- Crow Hill (SO635264)
- Crowther's Pool (SO219484)
- Crozen (SO574483)
- Crumpton Hill (SO763488)
- Cupid's Hill (SO408255)
- Cusop (SO235416)

== D ==
- Dancing Green (SO634206)
- Darbys Green (SO746565)
- Didley (SO455322)
- Dilwyn (SO412543)
- Dinedor (SO534367)
- Dinedor Cross (SO519358)
- Discoed (SO273643)
- Docklow (SO563577)
- Dodmarsh (SO576436)
- Dol-y-cannau (SO200490)
- Dolyhir (SO245575)
- Donnington (SO705335)
- Dormington (SO585404)
- Dorstone (SO314412)
- Dulas (SO371293)
- Durlow Common (SO632399)
- Duxmoor (SO445779)

== E ==
- Eardisland (SO418585)
- Eardisley (SO315493)
- East Dean (SO653208)
- Easthampton (SO408634)
- Eastnor (SO732372)
- Eastwood (SO629405)
- Eaton (SO505583)
- Eaton Bishop (SO443383)
- Eau Withington (SO543428)
- Ebnall (SO478585)
- Edvin Loach (SO664582)
- Edwyn Ralph (SO645575)
- Eign Hill (SO525398)
- Elms Green (SO508564)
- Elsdon (SO324544)
- Elton (SO454707)
- Elton's Marsh (SO497435)
- English Bicknor (SO585154)
- Enmore Field (SO464648)
- Even Pits (SO568366)
- Evendine (SO756415)
- Evesbatch (SO687486)
- Ewyas Harold (SO388286)
- Eye (SO495638)
- Eyton (SO473617)

== F ==
- Fairfields (SO747324)
- Falcon (SO604323)
- Fawley Chapel (SO583293)
- Felton (SO573489)
- Fiddler's Green (SO579355)
- Field (SO305505)
- Field's Place (SO415532)
- Fine Street (SO332393)
- Fishpool (SO663297)
- Five Bridges (SO657464)
- Flaggoners Green (SO644549)
- Flintsham (SO319584)
- Floodgates (SO288571)
- Ford (SO511553)
- Fownhope (SO587345)
- Fox Hill (SO685453)
- Foxley (SO413468)
- Foy (SO598286)
- Franklands Gate (SO536464)
- Fromes Hill (SO674467)
- Fromington (SO537475)

== G ==
- Ganarew (SO525166)
- Garway (SO465224)
- Garway Hill (SO444257)
- Gelli Gandryll (SO227425)
- Gilfach (SO345346)
- Glewstone (SO551227)
- Golden Valley (SO667494)
- Golder Field (SO564614)
- Goodrich (SO574193)
- Goose Pool (SO463363)
- Gorsley Common (SO671252)
- Gosford (SO532686)
- Grafton (SO496375)
- Grantsfield (SO525609)
- Great Doward (SO549164)
- Green Crize (SO515374)
- Green Lane (SO624453)
- Greenhill (SO713484)
- Greete (SO573706)
- Grendon Bishop (SO596565)
- Grendon Green (SO595573)
- Greytree (SO593257)
- Grittlesend (SO727495)
- Grove (SO615445)

== H ==
- Hagley (SO565418)
- Hales Bank (SO618506)
- Hales Wood (SO606305)
- Hallwood Green (SO675338)
- Halmond's Frome (SO678475)
- Ham Green (SO745445)
- Hamnish Clifford (SO535592)
- Hampton Bishop (SO552388)
- Hampton Park (SO538395)
- Hardwicke (SO261432)
- Harewood End (SO522279)
- Hatfield (SO599596)
- Haven (SO406546)
- Haven (SO586495)
- Hawkersland Cross (SO535474)
- Headbrook (SO303567)
- Heath (SO382765)
- Hengoed (SO227535)
- Hereford (SO510398)
- High Lane (SO675607)
- Highway (SO457495)
- Hildersley (SO619245)
- Hill Gate (SO495276)
- Hillend Green (SO706285)
- Hillhampton (SO584472)
- Hinton (SO332382)
- Hipplecote (SO742572)
- Hoarwithy (SO546293)
- Hole-in-the-Wall (SO614287)
- Hollybush (SO767364)
- Holme Lacy (SO554354)
- Holme Marsh (SO344541)
- Holmer (SO501422)
- Holywell (SO372413)
- Hom Green (SO587224)
- Hope Mansell (SO627196)
- Hope under Dinmore (SO506525)
- Hope's Rough (SO635475)
- Hopley's Green (SO345527)
- Horseway Head (SO347605)
- How Caple (SO605307)
- Howton (SO417295)
- Humber (SO535566)
- Hunderton (SO496385)
- Hungerstone (SO445355)
- Huntington (SO249536)
- Huntington (SO485419)
- Hurstley (SO354482)
- Hyde (SO452552)

== I ==
- Ivington (SO472564)

== J ==
- Jay (SO389750)

== K ==
- Kenchester (SO436435)
- Kentchurch (SO415255)
- Kerne Bridge (SO585186)
- Kerry's Gate (SO396335)
- Kiln Green (SO603192)
- Kilpeck (SO446303)
- Kimbolton (SO528615)
- King's Acre (SO475416)
- King's Caple (SO566284)
- King's Pyon (SO437505)
- King's Thorn (SO505315)
- Kingsfield (SO525496)
- Kingsland (SO446615)
- Kingstone (SO423356)
- Kingstone (SO631246)
- Kingswood (SO293547)
- Kington (SO296566)
- Kinnersley (SO346496)
- Kinnerton (SO246634)
- Kinton (SO404748)
- Kivernoll (SO468325)
- Knapton Green (SO445521)
- Knightwick (SO721553)
- Knill (SO293607)
- Kynaston (SO545275)
- Kyre (SO625639)
- Kyre Green (SO609625)
- Kyre Park (SO625635)
- Kyrewood (SO605675)

== L ==
- Lady Halton (SO475755)
- Ladyridge (SO595316)
- Lane End (SO646195)
- Larport (SO575388)
- Lawton (SO448595)
- Laysters (SO567636)
- Lea (SO655214)
- Lea Line (SO664217)
- Ledbury (SO711375)
- Leddington (SO695346)
- Ledgemoor (SO416503)
- Ledicot (SO416625)
- Leinthall Earls (SO445673)
- Leinthall Starkes (SO433691)
- Leintwardine (SO405740)
- Leominster (SO496590)
- Letton (SO339466)
- Letton (SO376704)
- Leys Hill (SO584197)
- Limebrook (SO376664)
- Lingen (SO364677)
- Linley Green (SO697535)
- Linton (SO665254)
- Linton Hill (SO664247)
- Lintridge (SO747325)
- Litmarsh (SO525497)
- Little Birch (SO517316)
- Little Cowarne (SO604516)
- Little Dewchurch (SO536316)
- Little Doward (SO546165)
- Little Garway (SO447243)
- Little Gorsley (SO685259)
- Little Hereford (SO559686)
- Little Hill (SO476275)
- Little Malvern (SO765406)
- Little Marcle (SO676364)
- Little Merthyr (SO264487)
- Little Tarrington (SO627415)
- Little Welland (SO805384)
- Llancloudy (SO494203)
- Llangarron (SO523213)
- Llangrove (SO523197)
- Llanrothal (SO470187)
- Llanveynoe (SO303312)
- Llanwarne (SO502288)
- Longtown (SO326285)
- Longworth
- Lower Bearwood (SO396575)
- Lower Breinton (SO475397)
- Lower Buckenhill (SO607335)
- Lower Bullingham (SO525386)
- Lower Burton (SO426566)
- Lower Egleton (SO626456)
- Lower Grove Common (SO556255)
- Lower Hardwick (SO405565)
- Lower Harpton (SO275606)
- Lower Hergest (SO276555)
- Lower Kinsham (SO356645)
- Lower Lye (SO407664)
- Lower Maes-coed (SO344303)
- Lower Rabber (SO253541)
- Lower Sapey (SO691603)
- Lower Southfield (SO693427)
- Lower Todding (SO407755)
- Lower Town (SO635424)
- Lower Welson (SO294503)
- Lower Wyche (SO773449)
- Loxter (SO719406)
- Lucton (SO436646)
- Ludford (SO516736)
- Ludstock (SO686355)
- Lugg Green (SO445624)
- Lugwardine (SO544413)
- Lulham (SO403413)
- Lulsley (SO743557)
- Luston (SO487635)
- Luxley (SO685217)
- Lyde Cross (SO517435)
- Lyne Down (SO645316)
- Lyonshall (SO333561)

== M ==
- Madley (SO419388)
- Mansell Gamage (SO395445)
- Mansell Lacy (SO425453)
- Marden (SO520474)
- Marl Bank (SO783408)
- Marlas (SO448295)
- Marlbrook (SO510546)
- Marlow (SO396764)
- Marston (SO364571)
- Marston Stannett (SO561558)
- Marstow (SO558195)
- Martley (SO755596)
- Mathon (SO736454)
- Maund Bryan (SO564501)
- Meadow Green (SO716564)
- Meer Common (SO364523)
- Merbach (SO303452)
- Merton,
- Merrivale (SO602233)
- Michaelchurch (SO523253)
- Michaelchurch Escley (SO313341)
- Middle Maes-coed (SO337335)
- Middleton (SO545692)
- Middleton on the Hill (SO542643)
- Millhalf (SO273483)
- Milton (SO243501)
- Moccas (SO353424)
- Monkhide (SO614437)
- Monkland (SO457574)
- Monmarsh (SO524498)
- Monnington on Wye (SO372433)
- Moorcot (SO355555)
- Moorend Cross (SO725452)
- Moorhampton (SO382464)
- Mordiford (SO571374)
- Moreton (SO506645)
- Moreton Jeffries (SO605488)
- Moreton-on-Lugg (SO505457)
- Mortimer's Cross (SO425635)
- Much Birch (SO505306)
- Much Cowarne (SO626474)
- Much Dewchurch (SO484313)
- Much Marcle (SO658327)
- Munderfield Row (SO647515)
- Munderfield Stocks (SO655505)
- Munsley (SO665408)
- Munstone (SO518425)
- Mynd (SO355745)

== N ==
- Nash (SO305626)
- Netherton (SO526265)
- New Mills (SO705384)
- Newcastle (SO444179)
- Newchurch (SO355508)
- Newman's Place (SO298495)
- Newton (SO295435)
- Newton (SO345325)
- Newton (SO375695)
- Newton (SO505535)
- Newtown (SO535334)
- Newtown (SO614441)
- Newtown (SO751571)
- Nextend (SO331576)
- Norbridge (SO714459)
- Norton Canon (SO384473)

== O ==
- Ocle Pychard (SO593463)
- Old Country (SO713443)
- Old Forge (SO553183)
- Old Gore (SO623281)
- Old Wharf (SO701364)
- Orcop (SO473264)
- Orcop Hill (SO474281)
- Orleton (SO493672)
- Orleton Common (SO477685)
- Overton (SO505721)

== P ==
- Panks Bridge (SO626484)
- Paradise Green (SO524477)
- Parkway (SO717355)
- Parton (SO315489)
- Peartree Green (SO599325)
- Pembridge (SO390581)
- Pen-allt (SO579294)
- Pencombe (SO594521)
- Pencraig (SO561201)
- Penguithal (SO501208)
- Penrhos (SO318564)
- Pen-y-park (SO274448)
- Perrystone Hill (SO638295)
- Perton (SO595405)
- Peterchurch (SO345386)
- Peterstow (SO566245)
- Phocle Green (SO625269)
- Picken End (SO819426)
- Pikestye (SO536485)
- Pipe and Lyde (SO505445)
- Pixley (SO665387)
- Pontrilas (SO396275)
- Pontshill (SO639215)
- Pool Head (SO555504)
- Poolbrook (SO794448)
- Poolmill (SO588245)
- Portway (SO485456)
- Pow Green (SO715441)
- Preston Marsh (SO565466)
- Preston Wynne (SO556465)
- Preston-on-Wye (SO385426)
- Prior's Frome (SO576395)
- Priory Wood (SO255454)
- Pudleston (SO564599)
- Putley (SO649376)
- Putley Common (SO636385)
- Putley Green (SO655376)
- Putson (SO516386)

== R ==
- Ravenhills Green (SO746545)
- Readings (SO615163)
- Red Hill (SO503386)
- Red Rail (SO546286)
- Rhydspence (SO246475)
- Richards Castle (SO495696)
- Ridgeway Cross (SO716475)
- Risbury (SO555559)
- Rodd (SO326625)
- Rodd Hurst (SO325624)
- Ross-on-Wye (SO601240)
- Rotherwas (SO538385)
- Rowland's Green (SO685369)
- Rowlestone (SO379274)
- Ruckhall (SO447395)
- Rudhall (SO625256)
- Rushall (SO646345)
- Rushock (SO305582)
- Ruxton (SO551291)
- Ruxton Green (SO544196)
- Ryelands (SO486584)
- Ryton (SO734321)

== S ==
- Saffron's Cross (SO541513)
- Sapey Bridge (SO723551)
- Sapey Common (SO701644)
- Sarnesfield (SO374508)
- Sellack (SO568275)
- Sellack Boat (SO565285)
- Shaw Common (SO695271)
- Shelwick (SO523436)
- Shelwick Green (SO526435)
- Shenmore (SO395385)
- Shirl Heath (SO435596)
- Shobdon (SO397617)
- Shucknall (SO586424)
- Shutton (SO654257)
- Snodhill (SO313407)
- Sollers Dilwyn (SO427554)
- Sollers Hope (SO614337)
- St Margarets (SO357335)
- St Michaels(SO586655)
- St Owen's Cross (SO535244)
- St Weonards (SO494243)
- Stagbatch (SO463583)
- Stanford Bishop (SO683513)
- Stanford Bridge (SO713658)
- Stanford-on-Teme (SO708655)
- Stanley Hill (SO675443)
- Stansbatch (SO348616)
- Stapleton (SO326655)
- Staplow (SO695415)
- Staunton on Arrow (SO365603)
- Staunton-on-Wye (SO363457)
- Steen's Bridge (SO547575)
- Steventon (SO525735)
- Stocking (SO625304)
- Stockton (SO514619)
- Stoke Bliss (SO659625)
- Stoke Cross (SO625508)
- Stoke Edith (SO608405)
- Stoke Hill (SO615496)
- Stoke Lacy (SO626495)
- Stoke Lane (SO635503)
- Stoke Prior (SO523569)
- Stoneyard Green (SO719444)
- Stony Cross (SO544663)
- Stony Cross (SO525476)
- Stony Cross (SO727475)
- Storridge (SO755485)
- Stowe (SO285475)
- Stowfield (SO595173)
- Strangford (SO583289)
- Stretford (SO529576)
- Stretford Court (SO446554)
- Stretton Grandison (SO634448)
- Stretton Sugwas (SO468424)
- Sugwas Pool (SO455416)
- Sunset (SO304568)
- Sutton Lakes (SO546465)
- Sutton Marsh (SO545441)
- Sutton St Michael (SO521453)
- Sutton St Nicholas, Herefordshire (SO533454)
- Sutton Walls (SO525463)
- Swainshill (SO464413)
- Sweet Green (SO643624)
- Swinmore Common (SO674417)
- Symonds Yat (SO557164)

== T ==
- Tarrington (SO615401)
- Tarrington Common (SO611393)
- Tedstone Delamere (SO693581)
- Tedstone Wafer (SO671593)
- The Bage (SO293436)
- The Cleaver (SO514297)
- The Fording (SO657255)
- The Forge (SO345595)
- The Hundred (SO525646)
- The Knapp (SO656545)
- The Lonk (SO577129)
- The Marsh (SO494593)
- The Moors (SO543324)
- The Pludds (SO614168)
- The Rhydd (SO468335)
- The Riddle (SO475627)
- The Vauld (SO537495)
- The Weaven (SO545316)
- The Wymm (SO536474)
- Thorn (SO274631)
- Thornbury (SO621596)
- Three Ashes (SO511233)
- Thruxton (SO433341)
- Tidnor (SO551398)
- Tillers' Green (SO698325)
- Tillington (SO465453)
- Tillinton Common (SO453467)
- Titley (SO337605)
- Totnor (SO595317)
- Tram Inn (SO467334)
- Treaddow (SO544241)
- Tretire (SO521232)
- Trumpet (SO656395)
- Tudorville (SO593227)
- Tumpy Lakes (SO549472)
- Tupsley (SO529403)
- Turkey Tump (SO504288)
- Turnastone (SO358365)
- Twyford Common (SO515355)
- Tyberton (SO385395)

== U ==
- Ullingswick (SO595498)
- Upcott (SO328505)
- Uphampton (SO395635)
- Upper Breinton (SO465406)
- Upper Broxwood (SO366535)
- Upper Buckenhill (SO595335)
- Upper Colwall (SO765435)
- Upper Dormington (SO585394)
- Upper Egleton (SO634441)
- Upper Grove Common (SO551264)
- Upper Hamnish (SO544598)
- Upper Hardwick (SO408574)
- Upper Hergest (SO264547)
- Upper Hill (SO477535)
- Upper Kinsham (SO365657)
- Upper Lyde (SO496445)
- Upper Lye (SO395653)
- Upper Maes-coed (SO333343)
- Upper Rochford (SO623678)
- Upper Sapey (SO688635)
- Upper Town (SO585495)
- Upper Welland (SO775405)
- Upper Welson (SO295514)
- Upper Wyche (SO774434)
- Upton Bishop (SO654273)
- Upton Crews (SO643277)
- Urdimarsh (SO527485)

== V ==
- Veldo (SO555434)
- Venn's Green (SO534487)
- Vowchurch (SO367366)
- Vowchurch Common (SO376375)

== W ==
- Wacton (SO615572)
- Walford, Leintwardine (SO392726)
- Walford, Ross-on-Wye (SO586204)
- Walker's Green (SO524478)
- Waller's Green (SO678395)
- Walson (SO435205)
- Walterstone (SO345255)
- Walton (SO255595)
- Wants Green (SO765574)
- Warden (SO304642)
- Warham (SO482397)
- Wayend Street (SO747365)
- Wellington (SO494483)
- Wellington Heath (SO713404)
- Welsh Bicknor (SO592176)
- Welsh Newton (SO499179)
- Welsh Newton Common (SO516175)
- Weobley (SO402515)
- Weobley Marsh (SO412516)
- West Lydiatt (SO556435)
- West Malvern (SO765465)
- West Town (SO445618)
- Westbrook (SO288434)
- Westfield (SO724479)
- Westfields (SO499425)
- Westhide (SO585444)
- Westhope (SO464511)
- Weston (SO361566)
- Weston Beggard (SO586414)
- Weston under Penyard (SO624234)
- Wharton (SO504553)
- Whitbourne (SO723567)
- Whitchurch (SO550176)
- White Cross (SO496405)
- White Rocks (SO435247)
- White Stone (SO567426)
- Whitechurch Maund (SO566495)
- Whiteleaved Oak (SO755351)
- Whitney-on-Wye (SO261473)
- Whitton (SO413744)
- Whitton (SO574727)
- Whyle (SO557605)
- Widemarsh (SO505416)
- Wigmore (SO416695)
- Willersley (SO315475)
- Wilson (SO558236)
- Wilton (SO586245)
- Winforton (SO295473)
- Winnal (SO453343)
- Winnal Common (SO453343)
- Winslow Mill (SO623364)
- Withington (SO564434)
- Withington Marsh (SO554443)
- Wofferwood Common (SO693517)
- Wolferlow (SO667614)
- Womaston (SO264607)
- Wood End (SO637415)
- Woolhope (SO619356)
- Woolhope Cockshoot (SO636376)
- Woonton (SO356524)
- Woonton (SO544621)
- Wootton (SO594393)
- Wormbridge (SO423316)
- Wormbridge Common (SO426315)
- Wormelow Tump (SO492302)
- Wormsley (SO425475)
- Wylde (SO455686)
- Wynds Point (SO766404)
- Wynn's Green (SO604479)
- Wyson (SO519674)

== Y ==
- Yarkhill (SO604426)
- Yarpole (SO476645)
- Yarsop (SO411477)
- Yatton (SO427665)
- Yazor (SO405466)

== See also ==
- List of settlements in Herefordshire by population
- List of places in England
