= South Herefordshire =

Former local government district in England

Coordinates: 51.99°N 2.70°W

- Area
  - 1974: 223,526 acres (904.58 km^{2})
- Population
  - 1973: 44,370
  - 1992: 52,900
- History
  - Created: 1 April 1974
  - Abolished: 31 March 1998
  - Succeeded by: Herefordshire
- Status: Non-metropolitan district
- Government
  - HQ: Hereford
  - Motto: Fidelis, Sapiens, Iustus (Honest, thoughtful, just)

South Herefordshire was one of nine local government districts of the English county of Hereford and Worcester from 1974 to 1998.

== History ==
South Herefordshire District was formed on 1 April 1974 as part of a general reorganisation of local administration in England and Wales under the Local Government Act 1972. It was formed from part of the administrative county of Herefordshire, and covered the area of four former districts, which were abolished at the same time:

- Dore and Bredwardine Rural District
- Ross-on-Wye Urban District
- Hereford Rural District
- Ross and Whitchurch Rural District.

The district entirely surrounded the district of Hereford.

It was originally intended for there to be 1 single district for Herefordshire, it was later decided to split it into 3.

Following a review by the Local Government Commission for England, South Herefordshire and the county of Hereford and Worcester were abolished in 1998. South Herefordshire was combined with the areas of City of Hereford, most of the district of Leominster, and part of the district of Malvern Hills to form a new unitary authority of Herefordshire.

== Parishes ==
The district comprised the following civil parishes:.

- Abbey Dore
- Aconbury
- Allensmore
- Aston Ingham
- Bacton
- Ballingham
- Bartestree
- Bolstone
- Brampton Abbotts
- Bredwardine
- Breinton
- Bridstow
- Brockhampton
- Burghill
- Callow
- Clehonger
- Clifford
- Craswall
- Credenhill
- Cusop
- Dewsall
- Dinedor
- Dinmore
- Dormington
- Dorstone
- Dulas
- Eaton Bishop
- Ewyas Harold
- Fownhope
- Foy
- Ganarew
- Garway
- Goodrich
- Grafton
- Hampton Bishop
- Harewood
- Haywood
- Hentland
- Holme Lacy
- Holmer and Pipe
- Hope Mansell
- How Caple
- Kenchester
- Kenderchurch
- Kentchurch and Kilpeck
- Kings Caple
- Kingstone
- Lea
- Linton
- Little Birch
- Little Dewchurch
- Llancillo
- Llandinabo
- Llangarron
- Llanrothal
- Llanveynoe
- Llanwarne
- Longtown
- Lower Bullingham
- Lugwardine
- Lyde
- Madley
- Marden
- Marstow
- Michaelchurch Escley
- Mordiford
- Moreton-on-Lugg
- Much Birch
- Much Dewchurch
- Newton
- Orcop
- Pencoyd
- Peterchurch
- Peterstow
- Preston Wynne
- Ross-on-Wye (Town)
- Ross Rural
- Rowlstone
- St Devereux
- St Margarets
- St Weonards
- Sellack
- Sollers Hope
- Stoke Edith
- Stretton Sugwas
- Sutton
- Thruxton
- Tretire with Michaelchurch
- Treville
- Turnastone
- Tyberton
- Upton Bishop
- Vowchurch
- Walford
- Walterstone
- Wellington
- Welsh Bicknor
- Welsh Newton
- Westhide
- Weston Beggard
- Weston-under-Penyard
- Whitchurch
- Withington
- Wormbridge
- Yatton

== Political control ==
The first elections to the council were held in 1973, initially operating as a shadow authority before coming into its powers on 1 April 1974. Throughout the council's existence from 1974 until 1998, a majority of the seats were held by independent councillors.

Party in control	Years
Independent	1974-1998

== Premises ==
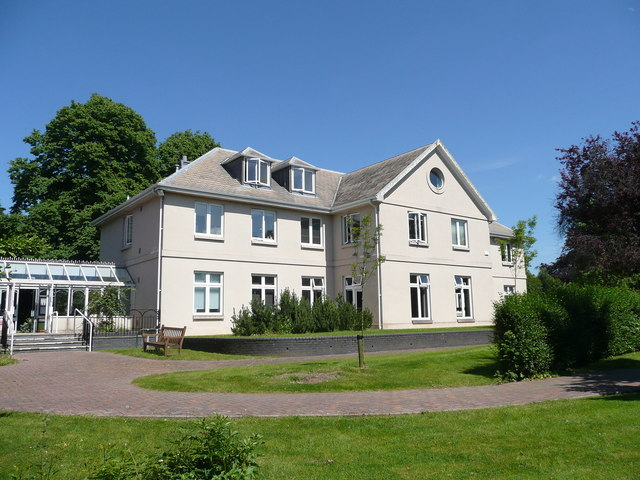
Brockington, 35 Hafod Road, Hereford: Council's headquarters 1977–1998

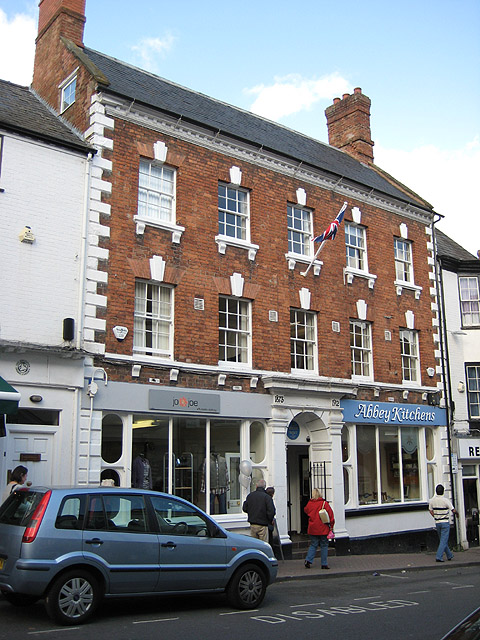
Council Chambers, 20 Broad Street, Ross-on-Wye: Additional council offices.

When first created the council inherited various offices from its predecessor authorities. In 1977 it bought a large former house called Brockington at 35 Haford Road in Hereford, outside the council's administrative area. Brockington had been built in 1909 and had served as the headquarters of Herefordshire Constabulary since 1946. The building was converted to become the council's headquarters and was substantially extended. The council also maintained an area office at the old Ross-on-Wye Urban District Council Chambers at 20 Broad Street.

== Elections ==
- 1973 South Herefordshire District Council election
- 1976 South Herefordshire District Council election
- 1979 South Herefordshire District Council election (New ward boundaries)
- 1980 South Herefordshire District Council election
- 1982 South Herefordshire District Council election
- 1983 South Herefordshire District Council election
- 1984 South Herefordshire District Council election
- 1986 South Herefordshire District Council election (District boundary changes took place but the number of seats remained the same)
- 1987 South Herefordshire District Council election
- 1988 South Herefordshire District Council election (District boundary changes took place but the number of seats remained the same)
- 1990 South Herefordshire District Council election
- 1991 South Herefordshire District Council election (New ward boundaries)
- 1992 South Herefordshire District Council election
- 1994 South Herefordshire District Council election
- 1995 South Herefordshire District Council election
- 1996 South Herefordshire District Council election
