= Bagwyllydiart =

Coordinates: 51.938°N 2.809°W

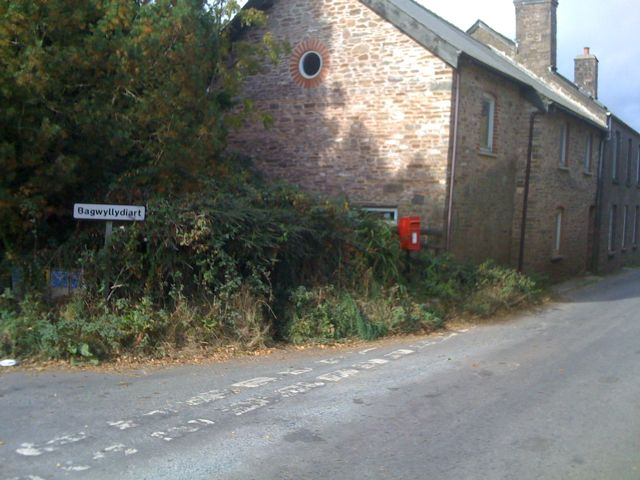
- Bagwyllydiart Cross. This hamlet marks the meeting point of five parishes.

- Location within Herefordshire
- OS grid reference: SO4426
- Unitary authority: Herefordshire
- Ceremonial county: Herefordshire
- Region: West Midlands
- Country: England
- Sovereign state: United Kingdom
- Post town: Hereford
- Postcode district: HR2
- Dialling code: 01981
- Police: West Mercia
- Fire: Hereford and Worcester
- Ambulance: West Midlands
- UK Parliament: Hereford and South Herefordshire

Bagwyllydiart is a hamlet in Herefordshire, England 10 miles south west of Hereford near the Welsh border. It lies between the villages of Kentchurch, Orcop, and Garway.
