= List of settlements in Herefordshire by population =

The largest settlements of the county of Herefordshire, with its city in bold.

This is a list of settlements in Herefordshire by population based on the results of the 2021 census. The next United Kingdom census will take place in 2031. In 2021, there were 13 built-up area subdivisions with 1,000 or more inhabitants in Herefordshire, shown in the table below.

== Population ranking ==
#	Settlement	Population		
#	Settlement	2001	2011	2021
1	Hereford	55,378	59,252	60,480
2	Leominster	10,440	10,938	11,205
3	Ross-on-Wye	10,085	10,582	10,990
4	Ledbury	8,303	8,633	8,345
5	Bromyard	3,617	3,675	3,815
6	Kington	2,341	2,427	2,425
7	Credenhill	1,989	2,271	2,330
8	Colwall Stone	1,866	1,842	1,855
9	Bartestree	1,355	1,458	1,655
10	Kingstone	1,332	1,373	1,500
11	Weobley	1,024	1,070	1,275
12	Clehonger	1,024	1,070	1,215
13	Ewyas Harold	995	1,007	1,035

== See also ==
- Herefordshire
