= Thomas Blashill =

English architect (1830–1905)

Thomas Blashill (October 1830 – 19 January 1905) was an English architect, antiquarian and author. As head of London County Council's Architect's Department in the 1890s, he was particularly associated with the design of public buildings in London, including two major public housing programmes.

== Early life and education ==
Blashill was born in Sutton-in-Holderness (today Sutton-on-Hull), in the ceremonial county of the East Riding of Yorkshire. He worked as an assistant to his uncle (also called Thomas Blashill), who was a land agent and surveyor in Herefordshire, learning surveying and general building practices. He studied at University College London and spent three years training in the office of Thomas Knightley.

== Career ==
During the 1860s and 1870s, Blashill worked in partnership with City of London surveyor William Haywood (sometimes spelt 'Hayward'), assisting his work on Holborn Viaduct, and designing churches in Herefordshire – at Putley and Westhide, for example – and south London, notably Christ Church in Beckenham. He was elected an Associate of the Royal Institute of British Architects in 1866 and a Fellow in 1877.

In 1876 he was appointed District Surveyor for Bethnal Green East by the Metropolitan Board of Works and between 1886 and 1889 was the MBW's Superintending Architect of Metropolitan Buildings and Architect and Superintending Architect of the Board. When the MBW was abolished and replaced by the London County Council in 1889, Blashill became Superintending Architect of Metropolitan Buildings and Architect to the council.

As head of the LCC Architect's Department, Blashill was responsible for designs for a new council chamber in the Old County Hall in Spring Gardens. He also created a specialist team to oversee the LCC's response to the Housing of the Working Classes Act 1890, recruiting "high-minded and talented designers" to implement two major housing developments – the Boundary Estate in Shoreditch (with Owen Fleming and Rowland Plumbe; 1893–1900), and the Millbank Estate in Pimlico (1896–1902) – which enhanced the LCC's reputation for public architecture.

He also designed the Art Nouveau entrances for the Blackwall Tunnel (1897), the archways for the Rotherhithe Tunnel, several fire stations (Fulham, for example), parks buildings, including the Clapham Common bandstand (1890) and Tooting Bec Common café (1898), and in 1892 produced standard designs for London coroner's courts.

Blashill retired in 1899, and was succeeded by William Edward Riley (1852–1937).

== Publications ==
- Blashill, Thomas (1871), "On the Churches of Kilpeck and Rowlstone", Journal of the British Archaeological Association, Volume 27, pp. 489–95.
- Blashill, Thomas (1884), "The Castle of Dover", Journal of the British Archaeological Association, Volume 40, Issue 4 (1884), pp.373–378.
- Blashill, Thomas (1890–1892), "Rowlstone Church", Transactions of the Woolhope Naturalists' Field Club, pp. 249–50.
- Blashill, Thomas (1896), Sutton-In-Holderness: The Manor, The Berewic and the Village Community Hull, William Andrews & Co and A Brown & Son Ltd.
- Blashill, Thomas (1900), "The Housing of the Working Classes of London in the Future", Journal of the Sanitary Institute. 1900;21(2):321–337. doi:10.1177/146642400002100204
- Blashill, Thomas (1903). Evidences Relating to the Eastern Part of the City of Kingston-upon-Hull. A. Brown & Sons.
