= Totnor =

Hamlet in Herefordshire, England

Coordinates: 51.9765°N 2.5881°W

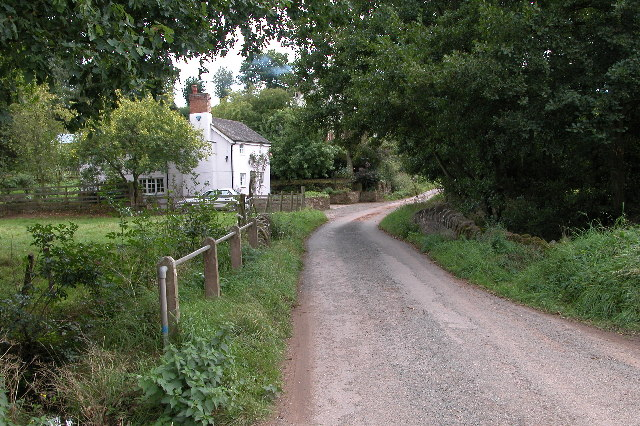
Cottage in Totnor

Totnor is a hamlet in Herefordshire in the parish of How Caple. It lies on the route of the Wye Valley Walk.
