= Llanveynoe =

Village in Herefordshire, England

Coordinates: 51.977°N 3.017°W

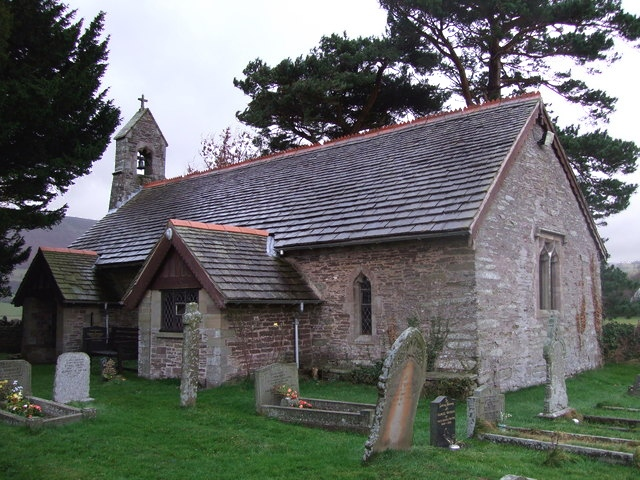
- Church of St Beuno & St Peter, Llanveynoe

- Location within Herefordshire
- Population: 102
- OS grid reference: SO301314
  - London: 200 km
- Civil parish: Llanveynoe
- Unitary authority: Herefordshire
- Ceremonial county: Herefordshire
- Region: West Midlands
- Country: England
- Sovereign state: United Kingdom
- Post town: HEREFORD
- Postcode district: HR2
- Dialling code: 01873
- Police: West Mercia
- Fire: Hereford and Worcester
- Ambulance: West Midlands
- UK Parliament: Hereford and South Herefordshire

Llanveynoe is a village and civil parish in Herefordshire, England, near the Welsh border and the Brecon Beacons National Park, 14 miles (23 km) south west of Hereford. The parish had a population of 104 in the 2001 UK Census and shares the Longtown grouped parish council with Craswall, Longtown and Walterstone.

The village is situated on a ridge of higher land between the Olchon Valley and the valley of the River Monnow.

The name Llanveynoe derives from the church of St Beuno in the village.

In the Herefordshire volume of The Buildings of England, Pevsner noted the beautiful setting and views from the church but regarded the building as being of little architectural interest following restoration in the 19th century.
