= Bowley =

Bowley is a surname. Notable people with the surname include:

- Arthur Lyon Bowley (1869–1957), English statistician and economist
- Flora Juliet Bowley (1881–1966), American actress
- Frederick Bowley (Worcestershire cricketer) (1873–1943), English cricketer
- Hannah Bowley (born 1984), Australian basketball player
- James E. Bowley, American academic
- Marian Bowley (1911–2002), economist and historian of economic thought
- Ted Bowley (1890–1974), cricketer who played for Sussex and England
- Will Bowley (born 1984), English rugby player
