= Westhide =

Village in Herefordshire, England

Coordinates: 52.093°N 2.604°W

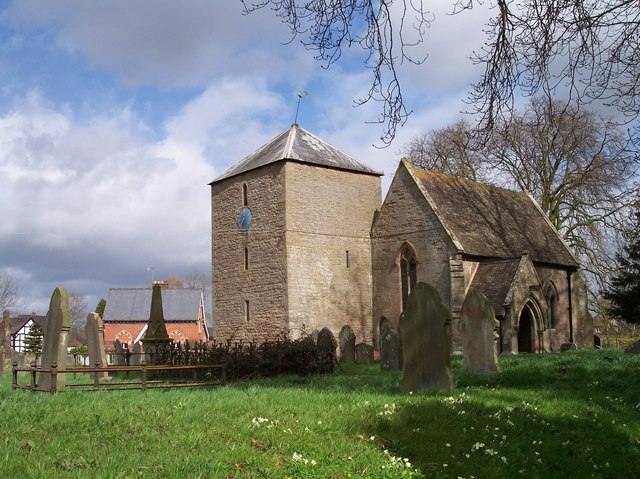
- Westhide Church

- Location within Herefordshire
- Population: 79 (Parish)
- OS grid reference: SO586440
  - London: 114 miles (183 km) ESE
- Civil parish: Westhide
- Unitary authority: Herefordshire
- Ceremonial county: Herefordshire
- Region: West Midlands
- Country: England
- Sovereign state: United Kingdom
- Post town: HEREFORD
- Postcode district: HR1
- Dialling code: 01432
- Police: West Mercia
- Fire: Hereford and Worcester
- Ambulance: West Midlands
- UK Parliament: North Herefordshire

Westhide is a village and civil parish in Herefordshire, England, 5 1/4 miles (8.4 km) north-east of Hereford. The parish had a population of 79 in the 2001 UK Census and is grouped with Preston Wynne and Withington to form Withington Group Parish Council for administrative purposes. The village lies on hilly farmland and to the south is Shucknall Hill.

The parish church is dedicated to St Bartholomew and has a large but short 12th-century tower. In the churchyard are the remains of a medieval preaching cross now topped by an 18th-century sundial. It went through a major restoration during the nineteenth century by architect Thomas Blashill, FRIBA, which included an addition of a south-facing porch.

The course of the Herefordshire and Gloucestershire Canal runs just north of the village.

== See also ==
- More information is to be found on the Group Parish's website
