= Walson =

Walson is both a surname and a given name. Notable people with the name include:

- John Walson (1915–1993), American inventor
- Walson Augustin (born 1988), Haitian footballer
- Walson Gardener (born 1932), American racing driver

== See also ==
- Watson (surname)
