= Holmer and Shelwick =

Civil parish in Herefordshire, England

Coordinates: 52.0807°N 2.7068°W

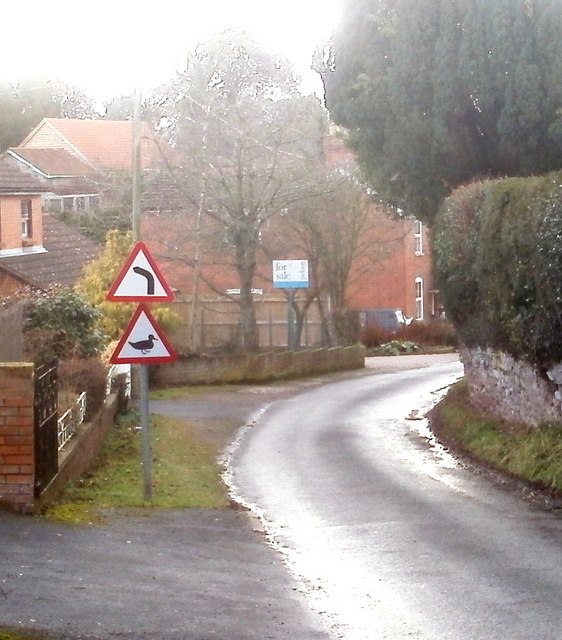
- Road signs warning of the hazards on the way into Holmer and Shelwick

- Location within Herefordshire
- Population: 1,386 (2011)
- OS grid reference: SE1923
- District: Herefordshire
- Shire county: Herefordshire
- Region: West Midlands
- Country: England
- Sovereign state: United Kingdom
- Post town: Hereford
- Postcode district: HR1, HR4
- Police: West Mercia
- Fire: Hereford and Worcester
- Ambulance: West Midlands

Holmer and Shelwick is a civil parish in Herefordshire, England. It is immediately to the north of Hereford and includes Holmer, Munstone, Shelwick and Shelwick Green. It is surrounded by rural fields, but the amenities of Hereford are very close by.

== Population and history ==
In the 1870s Holmer and Shelwick was described as:

"HOLMER, a village, a township, and a parish, in the district and county of Hereford. The village stands near the Shrewsbury and Hereford railway, 2 miles N of Hereford; and has a post office under Hereford.-The township includes Shelwick hamlet, and bears the name of Holmer and Shelwick."

Holmer and Shelwick was founded and created in 1837, however was then abolished in 1884 and became three separate parishes, these were Holmer, Holmer Within and Breinton. Holmer Within was also created out of the parish All Saints but was later abolished in 1932 and became a part of Hereford. Holmer is now what the parish of Holmer and Shelwick is known as, although Holmer and Shelwick is still used by some as the name of this small village.

In 1881, Holmer and Shelwick had a total population of 2,154, this was made up of 1,075 males and 1,079 females. The 1881 total population is a huge increase compared to 10 years earlier when there was a total population of 1,905 in 1871.

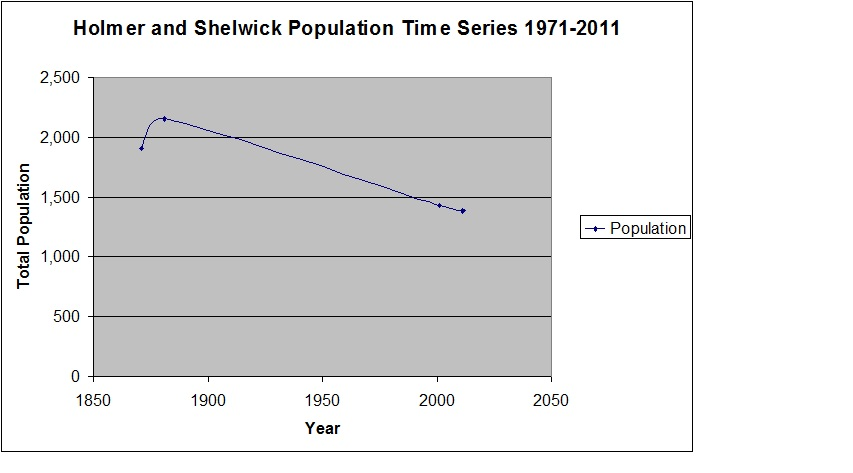
Holmer and Shelwick Population time series from 1871 to 2011

In 2001 Holmer and Shelwick had a population of 1,427 people, with 664 males and 763 females. The total number of households during this year were 523. The total population had decreased to 1,386 in 2011 according to the 2011 census. The 2011 total population was made up of 665 males and 721 females with a total of 535 households.

== Age structure ==
The total population of Holmer and Shelwick in the 2011 census was 1,386 people. Of this, the largest proportion of the total population was in the bracket of 45- to 59-year-olds with 336 people. The next largest bracket was 30- to 44-year-olds with 239 people, there are also 170 people within the bracket of 65- to 74-year-olds. This indicates that Holmer and Shelwick has a middle-aged and ageing population.

== Housing ==
Holmer and Shelwick had a total number of 490 houses in 1881 which was an increase from 437 houses which was the total number of houses ten years earlier in 1871. However, the 2011 census shows that there has been a further increase of 45 houses to bring the 2011 total number of houses to 535.

== Occupational history ==
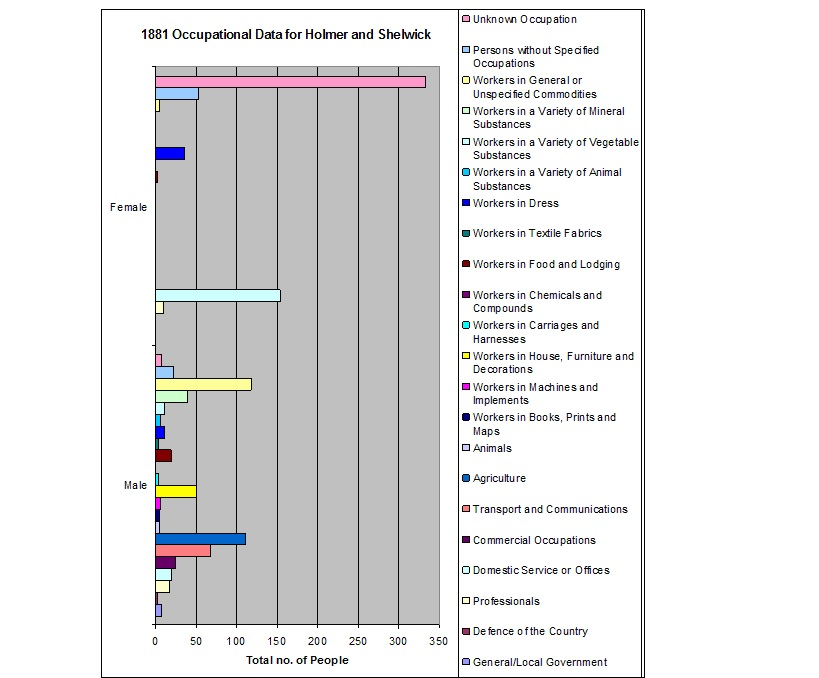
1881 Occupational Data for Holmer and Shelwick, Herefordshire

The 1881 Occupational Data graph, located on the left, shows the types of occupations residents of Holmer and Shelwick had during 1881. It also shows the number of males and females working in each profession and as a result the difference in work of males and females during this time.

It shows that the majority of women in the Parish during this time were most likely unemployed, due to the largest number of women falling under the "Unknown Occupation" title. The majority of women who were employed and fell into an actual occupation category took part in very un-skilled jobs such as 'Domestic Services' with 154 women in this category, with 126 being 'Domestic Indoor Servants', or 'Workers in Dress' with 36 women in this category. However, the majority of men during this time were either working with 'General or Unspecified Commodities', with 118 men in this category, or in 'Agriculture', with 111 men in this category. 'Transport and Communications' was the next largest occupation category for men.

However, 2011 Census data can help us see how occupational trends have changed in this area over time. As stated above, census data from 1881 shows that the areas of most employment for women during that time was in 'Domestic Services' and 'Workers in Dress', in 2011 the highest employment category for women is 'Human Health and Social Work Activities', with 71 women in this category, which could be linked to 'Domestic Services', however a complete contrast to this is the second highest employment category in 2011 for women which was 'Retail Trade, Repair of Motor Vehicles and Motor Cycles', with 57 women in this category, showing how employment for women has changed over time. For men in 2011 the highest employment category is now 'Construction' with 71 men working in this sector, and the second highest employment category is 'Manufacturing' with 61 men working in this sector. This again shows the change in employment areas for men now compared to 1881.

== Church of St Bartholomew ==
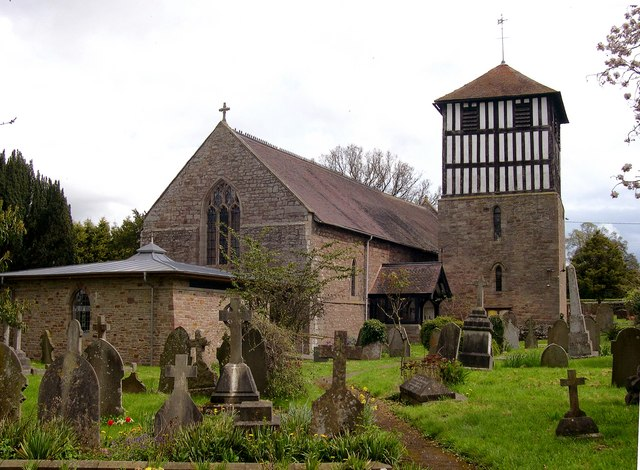
Church of Bartholomew in the Parish of Holmer and Shelwick

St Bartholomew's Church was built in Norman and Early English Styles with a 13th Century detached tower which was thought to be intended for defence purposes against the Welsh. The tower is topped with a black and white 16th century timber belfry with six bells, with the rest of the tower being made of stone. Some of the six bells are actually some of the oldest in Herefordshire. In 1865, three lancet windows in the chancel were decorated with rich stained glass in memory of the late Charles Bulmer, who was a local landowner in the Parish of Holmer and Shelwick. The Church of St Bartholomew is Grade I listed and has been listed since 27 January 1967, and the church also has a scheduled monument, a Churchyard Cross in the churchyard of the church.

Homer and Shelwick have a parish cemetery which contains the Commonwealth war grave of a Second World War Royal Air Force officer.
