= Sollers Hope =

Village in Herefordshire, England

Coordinates: 51.995285°N 2.5651778°W

- Location within Herefordshire
- Area: 4.666 km^{2} (1.802 sq mi)
- Population: 68 (2001 census)
  - Density: 15/km^{2} (39/sq mi)
- Civil parish: Sollers Hope
- Unitary authority: County of Herefordshire
- Shire county: Herefordshire
- Region: West Midlands
- Country: England
- Sovereign state: United Kingdom
- Police: West Mercia
- Fire: Hereford and Worcester
- Ambulance: West Midlands

Sollers Hope or Sollershope is a village and civil parish 8 miles (13 km) south east of Hereford, in the county of Herefordshire, England. In 2001 the parish had a population of 68. The parish touches Brockhampton, How Caple, Much Marcle, Woolhope and Yatton. Sollers Hope shares a parish council with How Caple and Yatton called "How Caple Sollershope and Yatton Group Parish Council".

== Landmarks ==
There are 14 listed buildings in Sollers Hope. Sollers Hope has a church called St Michael.

== History ==
The name "Hope" means 'Valley', the Sollers part being because the de Solariis family held land in the 13th century. Soller's Hope was recorded in the Domesday Book as Hope.
