= Eaton Bishop =

Village and civil parish in Herefordshire, England

Coordinates: 52°02′45″N 2°48′46″W

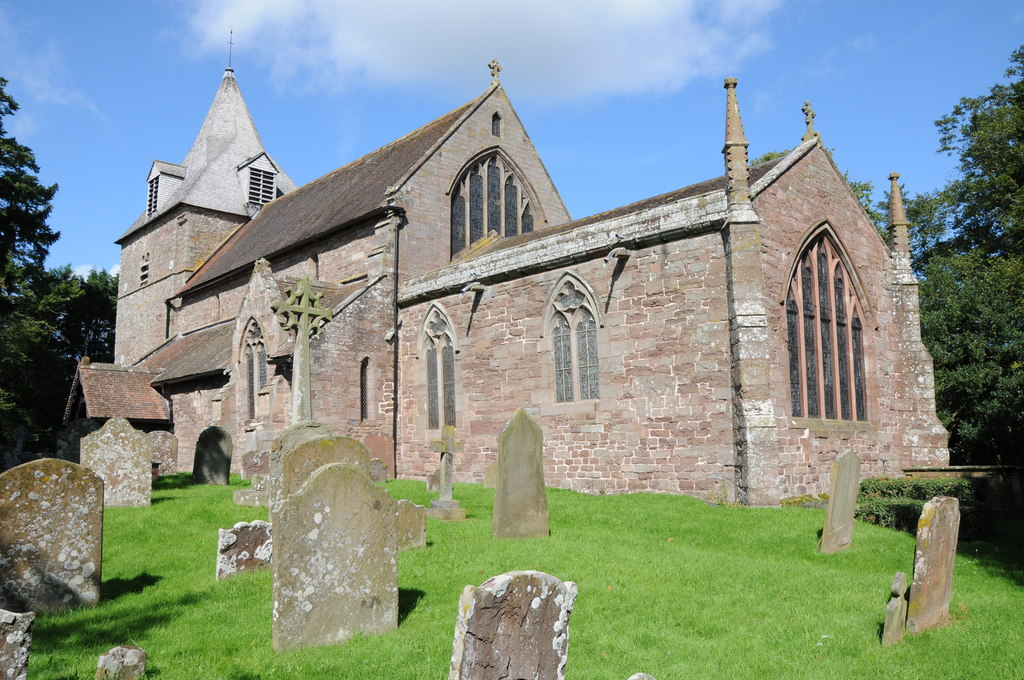

Eaton Bishop is a small village and civil parish in Herefordshire, West Midlands, England. It is located south west of Hereford and is between the villages of Clehonger and Madley. The village has a church dedicated to St Michael & All Angels and a village hall. It is located near the River Wye.
