= Woonton =

Hamlet in Herefordshire, England

Coordinates: 52°10′N 2°57′W

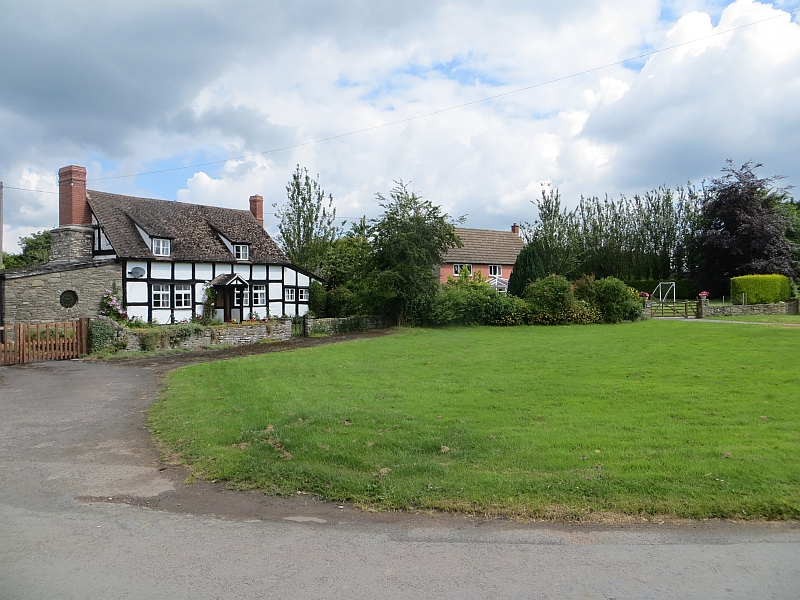
Woonton Green

Woonton is a hamlet which forms part of the parish of Almeley in Herefordshire, England. It is on the A480 road and is near the town of Kington.

It includes places on the National Heritage List for England such as the Woonton Farmhouse.
