= Almeley =

Village in Herefordshire, England

Coordinates: 52.159°N 2.978°W

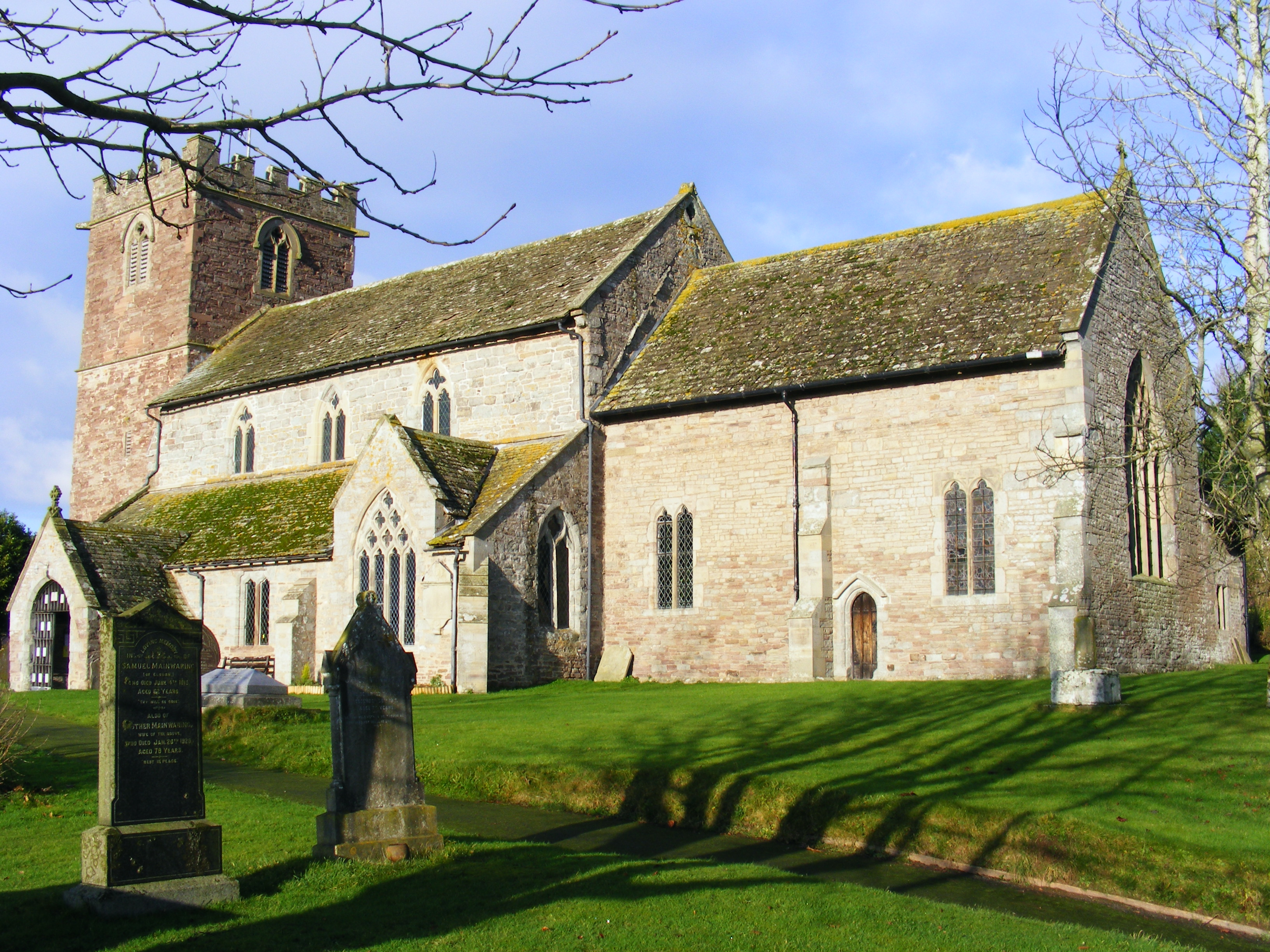
- St Mary's parish church

- Location within Herefordshire
- Population: 553 (2021 census)
- OS grid reference: SO332516
- Unitary authority: Herefordshire
- Ceremonial county: Herefordshire
- Region: West Midlands
- Country: England
- Sovereign state: United Kingdom
- Post town: Hereford
- Postcode district: HR3
- Dialling code: 01544
- Police: West Mercia
- Fire: Hereford and Worcester
- Ambulance: West Midlands
- UK Parliament: Hereford
- Website: Parish Council

Almeley (pronounced /ˈæmliː/) is a village and civil parish in Herefordshire, England. The civil parish includes the hamlets of Almeley Wootton, Lower Wootton, Woonton and Upcott. The 2021 census recorded the parish population as 553.

== Location and amenities ==
Almeley is in the west of the county, about 18 miles (29 km) northwest of Hereford, 13 miles (21 km) southwest of Leominster and 7 miles (11 km) from the border with Wales. The village is on the Black and White Village Trail.

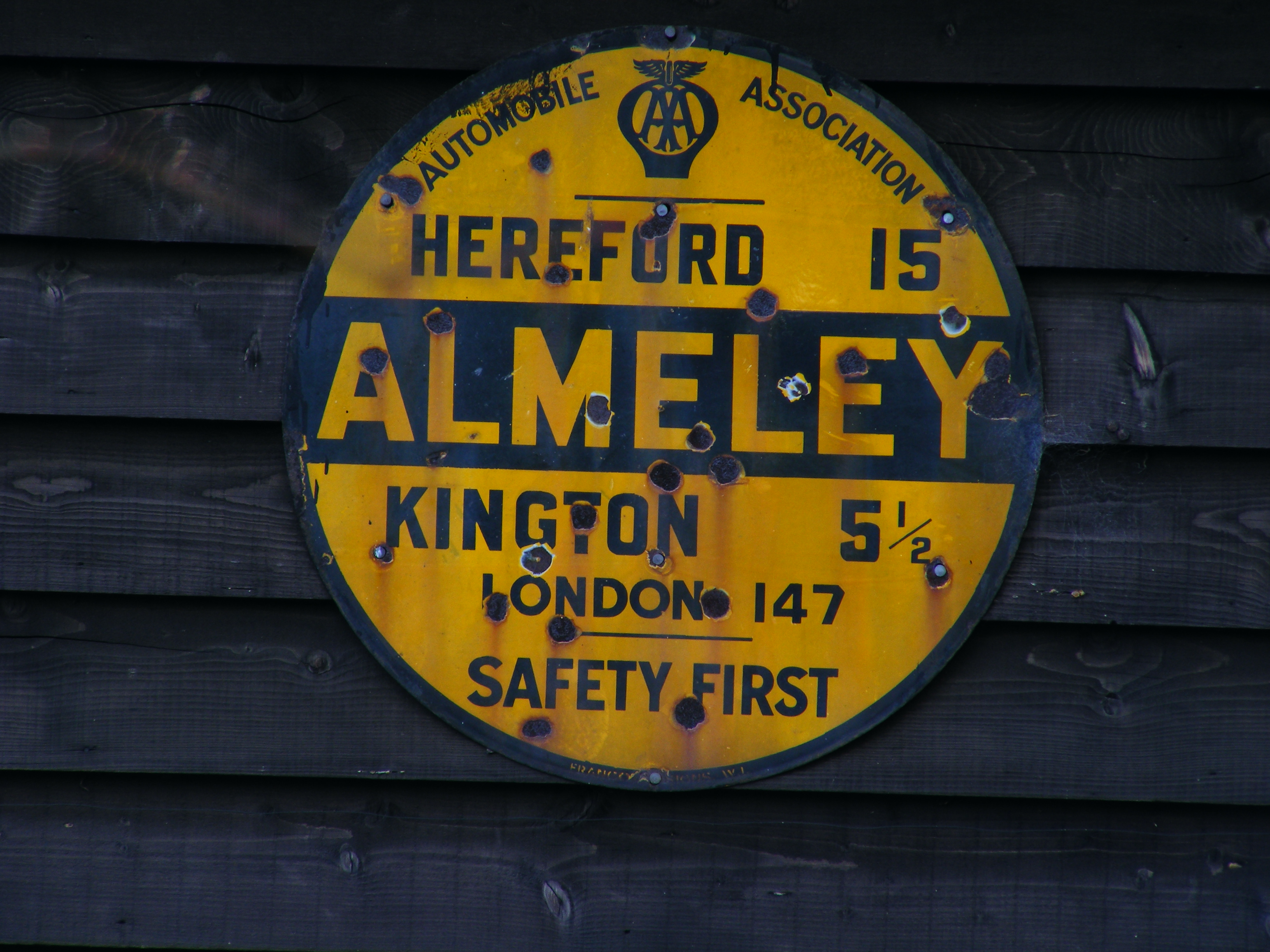
Historic AA sign in the village

Much of the present village is built around a triangle of roads, with St Mary's parish church to the south, and on the edge of the built area. East of the church is Almeley Primary School. The village hall is at the eastern point of the triangle. North of the church is The Bells public house, also containing a village shop. At one of the road junctions by the church are the war memorial and a small sculpture depicting Almeley Parish.

Of historical interest are the Oldcastle (on the north-west side of the village) and Almeley Castle just south of the church. A brook, offering a reliable water supply, runs past both castles.

Almeley was awarded "Best Kept Herefordshire Village" in 1990.

== History ==
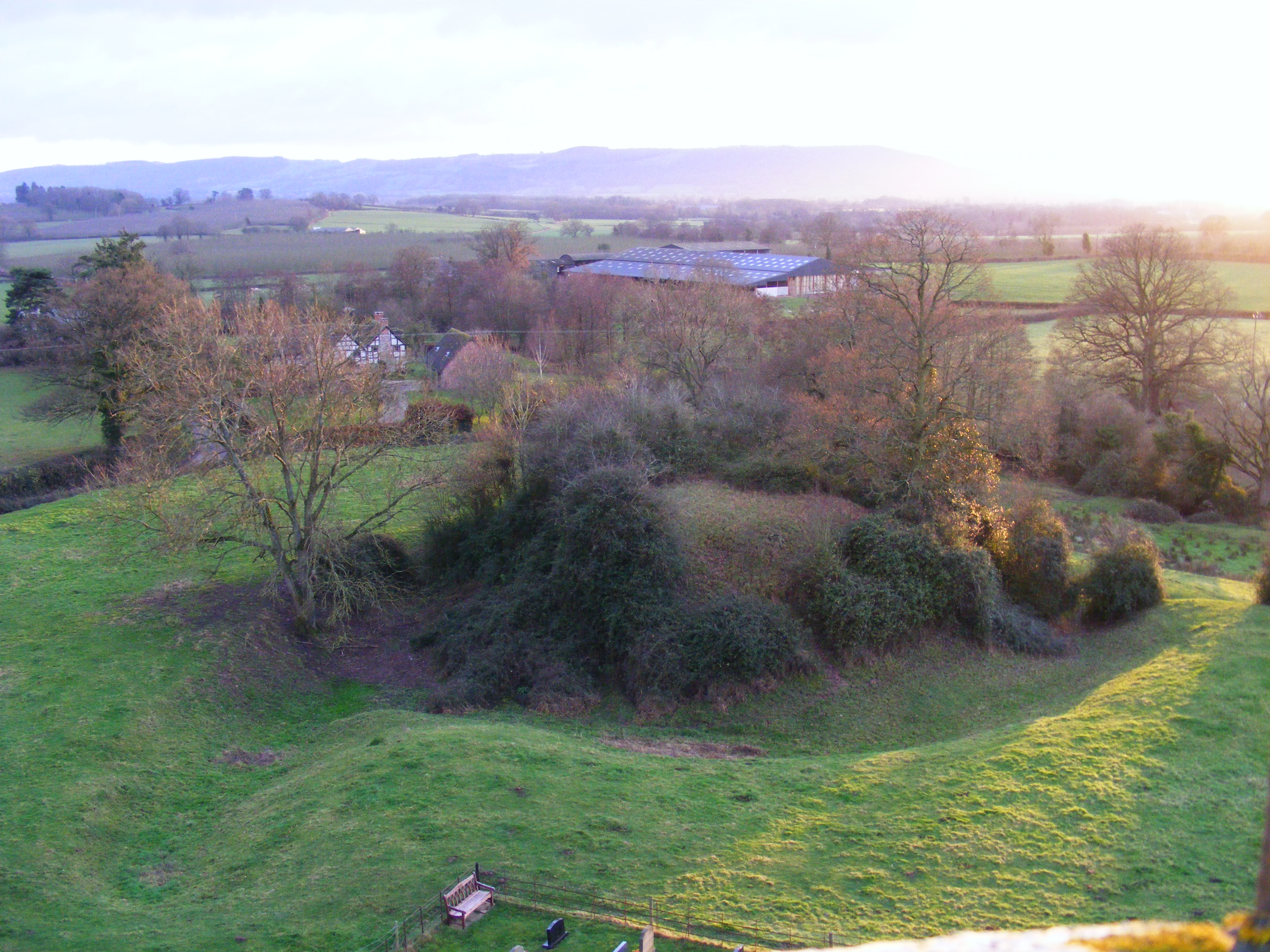
Almeley Castle, a Norman motte and bailey castle adjoined by two rectangular fish-ponds, now dry.

The Domesday Book of 1086 records Almeley as a manor. Almeley is also recorded in 14th-century Feet of Fines (property transaction records). There is an entry for it in Samuel Lewis' Topographical Dictionary of England of 1848.

The Church of England parish church of St Mary is largely 14-century and is a Grade I listed building.

Almeley is notable as the birthplace of Sir John Oldcastle, a Lollard sympathizer who was eventually executed for treason in 1417; his was the original name given to Shakespeare's character of Falstaff.

One of the early Quaker meeting houses is in Almeley Wootton, a hamlet in the parish about 1/2 mile (800 m) north of Almeley village. It was given to the Quakers in 1672 by its owner, Roger Prichard, and is still in use by Quakers today. It celebrated its 350th anniversary in 2022. Two of the Quakers who worshipped there (Roger's son, Edward Prichard, and Edward's brother-in-law, John Eckley) were involved with William Penn in setting up the colony of Pennsylvania in 1682.

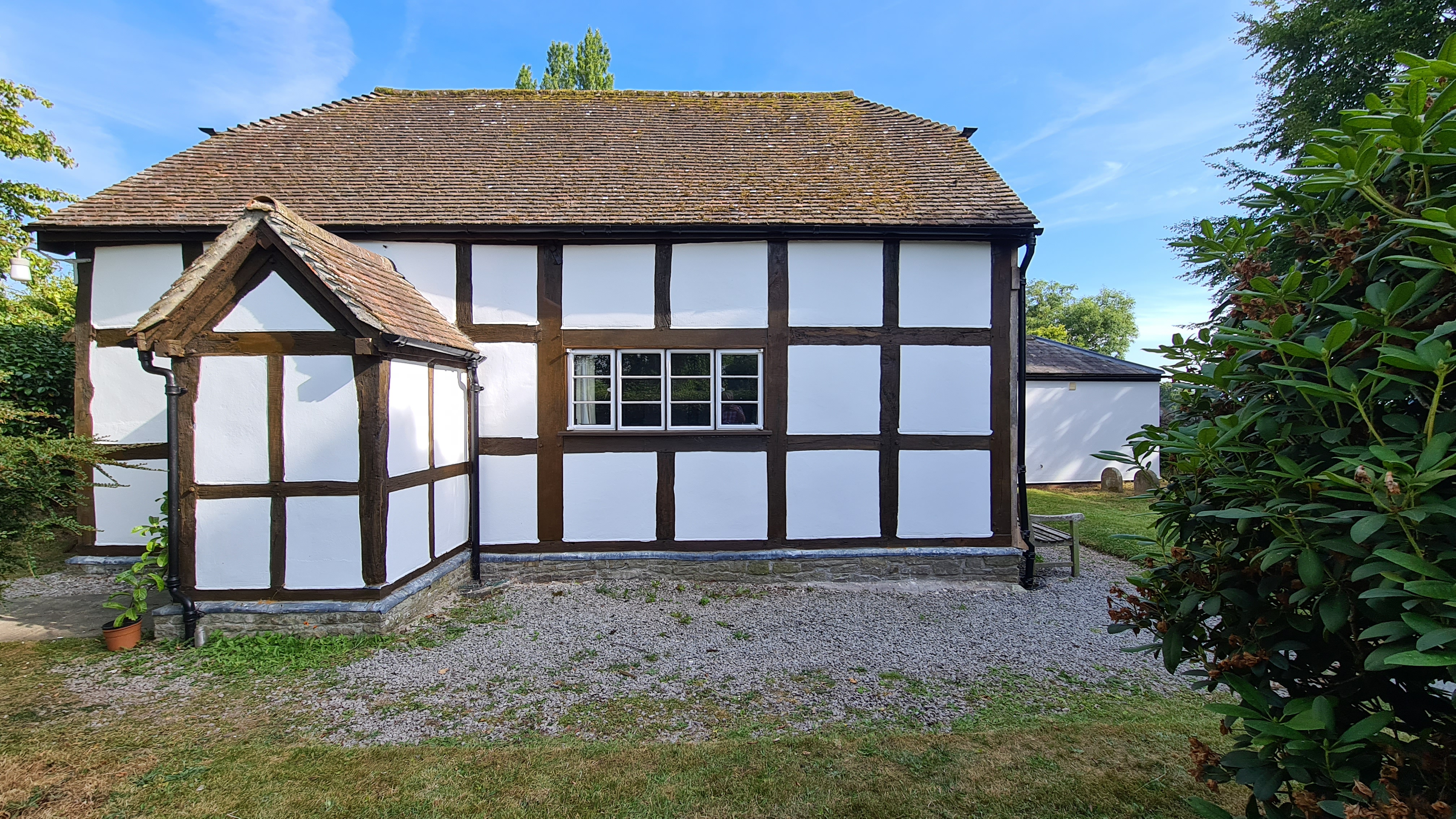
Northeast aspect of Almeley Quaker Meeting House

A third castle is in the hamlet of Woonton in the Parish near The Mere at a place called Hall Mote. The whole parish has physical evidence of shrunken settlement at Woonton, Almeley Wootton, Hopleys Green, Upcott and Logaston, numbering more than 100 buildings. There is also map evidence for these lost buildings, which appear to have disappeared by the mid 19th century. Finds from the parish include Neolithic polished axe heads from Upcott, flint tools from various locations, Roman coins from Spearsmarsh and Eccles Alley, Roman pottery from the Manor House area near the parish church, and coins of King John, Henry III, Edward I and most subsequent reigns until modern times, indicating continuous occupation for more than 4,000 years.

Almeley railway station was opened in 1874 and worked by the Great Western Railway. The GWR closed the station in 1917, reopened it in 1922 and closed it again in 1940. The railway has since been closed and dismantled.

== Demography and economy ==
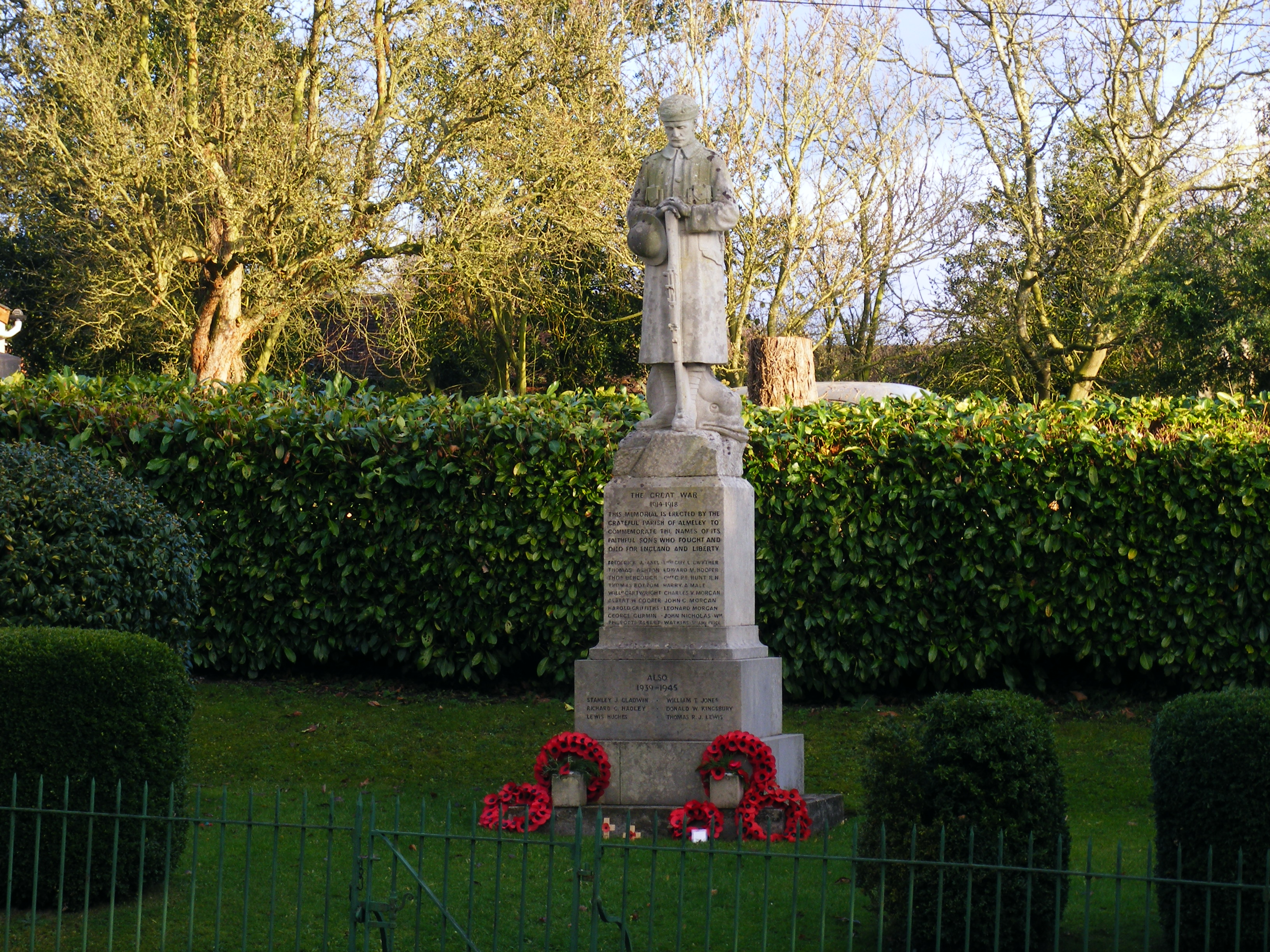
Parish war memorial

United Kingdom Census data show that the population of Almeley declined by about 30% from 1801 to 1971 (from 753 to 521) but the ratio of males to females has remained at 1:1 over the same period. As a rural parish, its population density remained low (at about 1 person per five acres) from 1850 to 1950. In this 100-year period the national average rose from about 2 people per 4 acres (16,000 m^{2}) to about 5 people per 4 acres (16,000 m^{2}).

The parish has a large number of farmers. Its land use is based largely on sheep, pasture and cider orchards.
