= Orcop =

Village in Herefordshire, England

Coordinates: 51.932°N 2.767°W

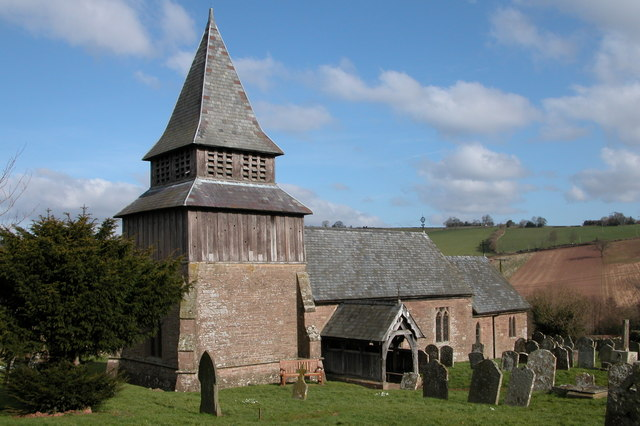
- Orcop church

- Location within Herefordshire
- Population: 417 (2011)
- OS grid reference: SO 474 262
- Civil parish: Hereford
- Unitary authority: Herefordshire
- Ceremonial county: Herefordshire
- Region: West Midlands
- Country: England
- Sovereign state: United Kingdom
- Post town: HEREFORD
- Postcode district: HR2
- Dialling code: 01981
- Police: West Mercia
- Fire: Hereford and Worcester
- Ambulance: West Midlands
- UK Parliament: Hereford and South Herefordshire

Orcop is a village and civil parish in south Herefordshire, England. It lies 9.4 miles west of Ross-on-Wye, and 10.2 miles south of the county town, Hereford.

It has a well-preserved early Norman motte-and-bailey castle and a church dedicated to St. John the Baptist which has a chancel built around 1300, and a tower that was added early in the 16th century. The larger village of Orcop Hill is nearby, which is considered part of the broader "Orcop" area.

== Attractions and amenities ==
=== St John The Baptist Church ===
A church with part of the build dating back to the 12th Century with a timber-framed bell tower constructed in the 16th century. There are heavy timbers supporting inside and weatherboarding on the tower without. The narrow aisle with arcade is early 13th century, with a later 13th-century chancel window; and the piscina, or font, is Norman. A south door is 14th century. And the nave had a wagon roof. In the 19th century, Thomas Nicholson, an architect, renovated the windows in the polygonal vestry and elsewhere in the church. Many of the church's original features were removed during a Victorian renovation. Known as 'the Poets Church' due to being the site where Frances Horovitz was laid to rest.

=== The Fountain Inn ===
A typical country pub, compact in size with an open fire. Closed in 2012 so the then owners could try to get planning permission to convert the pub into a residential dwelling, this application was rejected due to lack of supporting evidence for claims the business was not viable or needed in the community or that the Inn had been promoted in any way to aid its success. On 5 September 2014, planning was once again submitted for the same conversion, but for a 'Redundant Public House'. This planning was also rejected on the grounds that the business had shown no evidence that it is not viable in the area and also that there is insufficient evidence to suggest the building serves no purpose to the community. The pub reopened under new owners in December 2016.

=== Orcop Village Hall ===
A village hall that remains in use regularly by the Parish Council, Age Concern as well as offering keep-fit classes and being used for fundraising and family events. The hall also has a large car park, an outdoor sports area, and a capacity of 160 seats.

=== Farming and agriculture ===
Orcop is a surrounded by farmsland. Visitors and locals often purchase goods such as eggs, cider, apple juice and plants from the drives of properties with honesty boxes.

=== Walking ===
Footpaths surround Orcop, they wind up the hills into the neighbouring areas of Garway and St Weonards.

=== Shops ===
Orcop has no village stores, the only shop is a Canoe & Kayak Centre which is a farm diversification. As part of this diversification a lake was built on the farmland and a campsite has been Formed around this feature.

The nearest shops servicing the residents of Orcop are St Weonards Village Stores and Post Office, Carrot & Wine Store in Wormelow, and Pontrilas Post Office. The market town of Ross-on-Wye is approximately 9.4 miles away, and the county town of Hereford is approximately 10.2 miles away.
