= Thruxton, Herefordshire =

Village in Herefordshire, England

Coordinates: 52.007°N 2.820°W

Thruxton
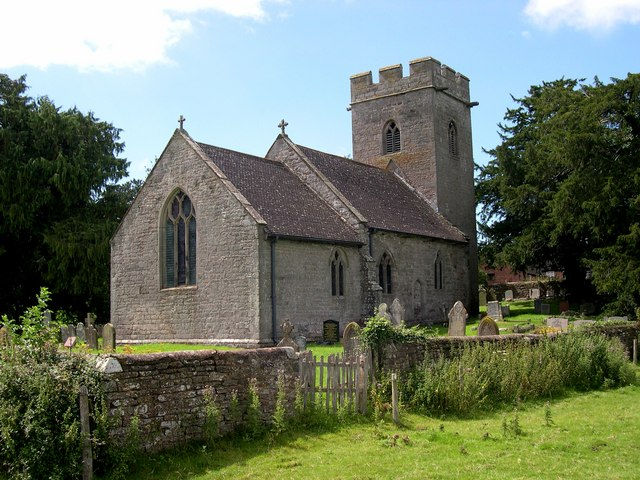
- St Bartholomew's church, Thruxton

- Location within Herefordshire
- Population: 33 (Parish)
- OS grid reference: SO437346
- Unitary authority: Herefordshire
- Ceremonial county: Herefordshire
- Region: West Midlands
- Country: England
- Sovereign state: United Kingdom
- Post town: HEREFORD
- Postcode district: HR2
- Dialling code: 01981
- Police: West Mercia
- Fire: Hereford and Worcester
- Ambulance: West Midlands
- UK Parliament: Hereford & South Herefordshire

Thruxton is a small rural village and civil parish in Herefordshire, England. It is located within the historic area of Archenfield, near the Welsh border and the city of Hereford. The village lies west of the A465 road and just south of the B4348 road between Kingstone and Much Dewchurch.

The parish had a population of 33 in the 2001 UK Census and is grouped with Kingstone to form Kingstone & Thruxton Group Parish Council for administrative purposes.

The parish church, dedicated to St. Bartholomew, is mainly in the Decorated style.
