= Callow, Herefordshire =

Village and civil parish in Herefordshire, England

Coordinates: 52°0′18″N 2°44′14″W

Callow
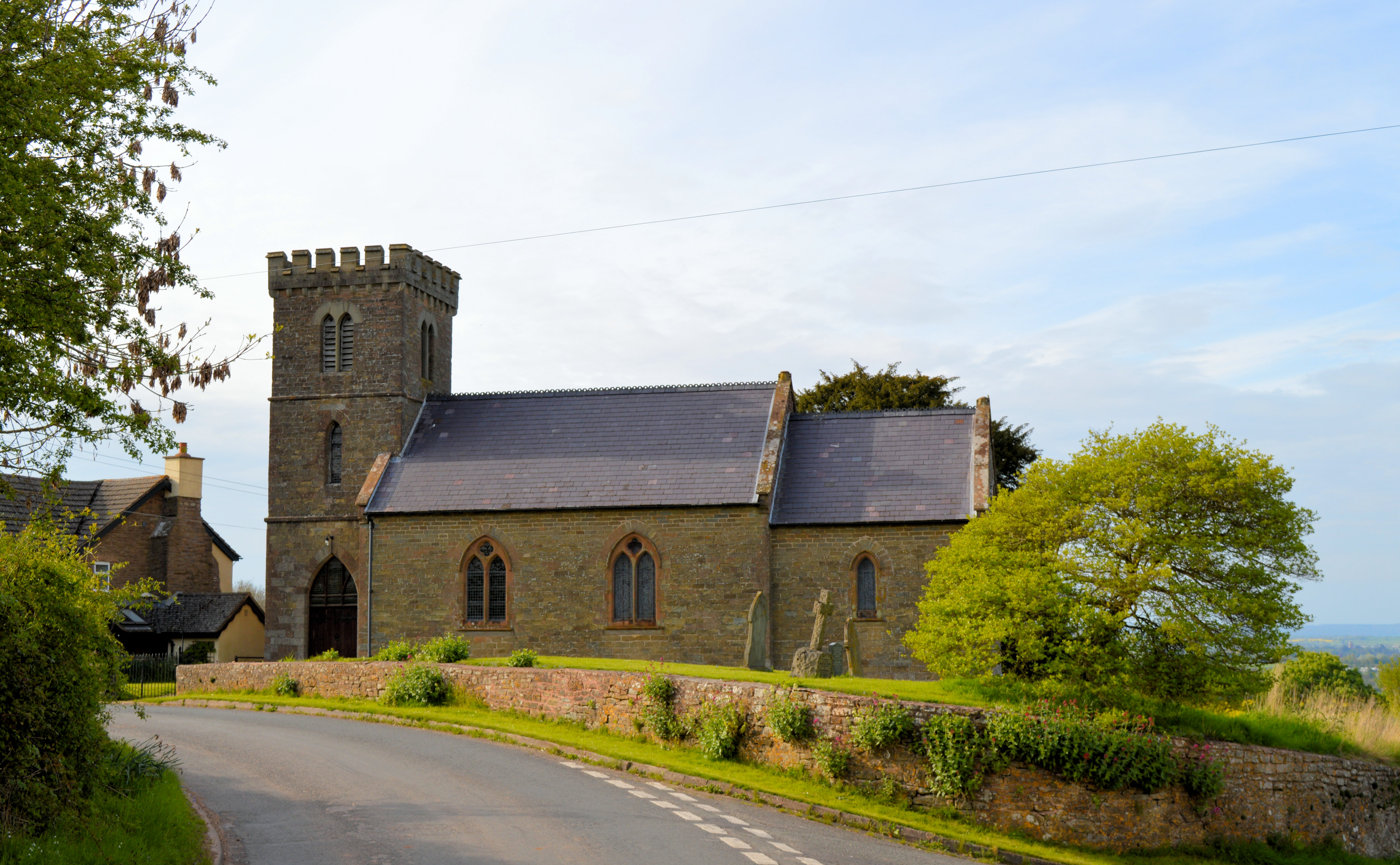
- St Mary's church

- Location within Herefordshire
- OS grid reference: SO4934
- Unitary authority: Herefordshire
- Ceremonial county: Herefordshire
- Region: West Midlands
- Country: England
- Sovereign state: United Kingdom
- Post town: HEREFORD
- Postcode district: HR2
- Dialling code: 01981
- Police: West Mercia
- Fire: Hereford and Worcester
- Ambulance: West Midlands
- UK Parliament: Hereford & South Herefordshire

Callow is a village and civil parish in Herefordshire, England, about 4 miles (6.4 km) south of Hereford. The church is dedicated to St Mary.

== Geography ==
Callow is situated in the West Midlands region of England and falls within the Hereford and South Herefordshire parliamentary constituency. The village is surrounded by farmland and gentle hills characteristic of the Herefordshire countryside. Nearby localities include Aconbury and the hamlet of Portway.

== History ==
The history of Callow dates back to the medieval period, with evidence of earlier human habitation in the surrounding area.

== St. Mary’s Church ==
St. Mary’s Church, a Grade II listed building, is the village’s most notable historic landmark. The current church structure was rebuilt in 1830 by architect L. Johnson and expanded in 1884 by Lloyd Oswald. The church was closed for worship in 1994 but remains a significant architectural and historical feature of the village. The church is built from squared and rock-faced sandstone with sandstone dressings, topped with a Welsh slate roof. It features a west tower, a two-bay nave, a one-bay chancel, a vestry, and an organ chamber. Inside, the church contains a 13th-century font, various wall monuments from the earlier church, and stained-glass windows commemorating notable local figures, including Caroline Horton and John Horton.

== Governance ==
Callow is governed at the local level by the Callow and Haywood Parish Council, which also oversees the neighbouring parishes of Haywood and Grafton. The parish council addresses local issues and represents the community within the wider governance framework of Herefordshire Council.

== Community and Land Use ==
The village maintains a rural character, with most of the land used for agriculture. Callow does not have significant commercial or residential development, preserving its historic and pastoral setting. The surrounding area is popular for walking and countryside activities.
