= Bolstone =

Village in Herefordshire, England

Coordinates: 51.990°N 2.655°W

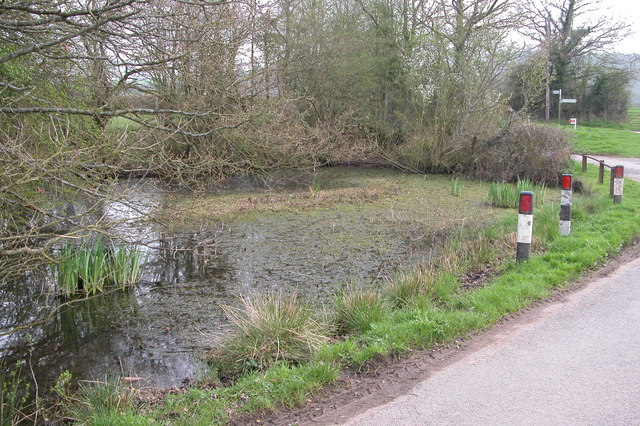
Village pond

Bolstone is a hamlet and civil parish in Herefordshire, England, 9 km (5.6 mi) south of Hereford. According to the 2001 census, it had a population of 34.
