= Dulas, Herefordshire =

Civil parish in England

Coordinates: 51.962°N 2.913°W

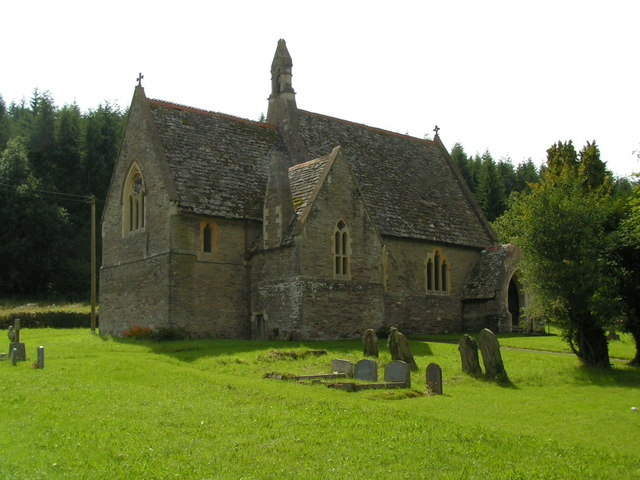
The church of St. Michael, Dulas.

Dulas is a civil parish in the County of Herefordshire in England, 11 mi (18 km) south west of Hereford. There is no village named Dulas, as the parish consists mainly of scattered farms and dwellings. The major buildings within the parish are Dulas Court, a Victorian country house now used as a residential home; and the now redundant church of St. Michael. The Church was the replacement for a much older building, which was demolished when the Court was built; all that remains of the original church are an ancient cross and a couple of gravestones on the front lawn of the residential home.

Due to the parish's unspoilt rural nature, it is home to some nationally rare wildlife. The churchyard hosts a variety of orchids, and the Dulas brook that runs through the parish is home to otters and white-clawed crayfish. Dulas is a common name, from the Welsh language, for rivers and streams. Of these, two are tributaries of the River Wye. The Afon Dulas means the dark blue river. The Dulas here flows into the River Monnow which is a tributary of the River Wye.
