= Breinton =

Civil parish in Herefordshire, England

Coordinates: 52.055°N 2.780°W

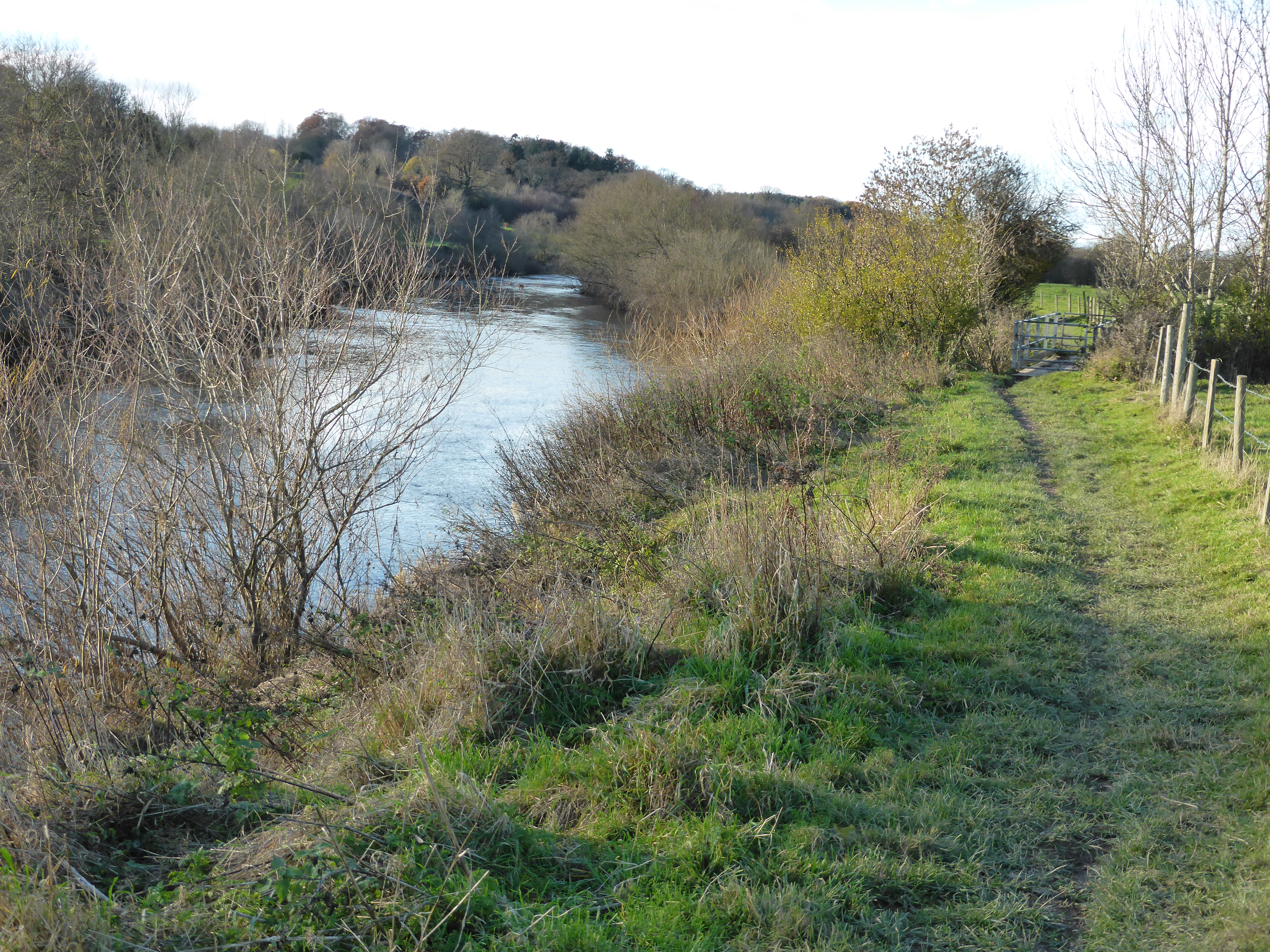
The River Wye at Breinton, Herefordshire

Breinton is a civil parish in Herefordshire, England. Breinton lies just to the west of Hereford. The name Breinton appears to be a modernised form of the word Bruntone, meaning a village near a flowing stream.

Breinton is a collection of hamlets two miles to the west of Hereford: Warham, Upper Breinton, Lower Breinton, Breinton Common, and Veldifer; with a church (St. Michael’s) and a Village Hall. Relatively few new buildings have been built on valuable land since those shown on the 1839 tithe map. The parish boundary is irregular but generally encloses the land between the River Wye and the A438 that runs between Hereford and Brecon. Half the population of Breinton (726 adults in the 2011 Census) live on or close to Kings Acre Road (A438).

== History ==
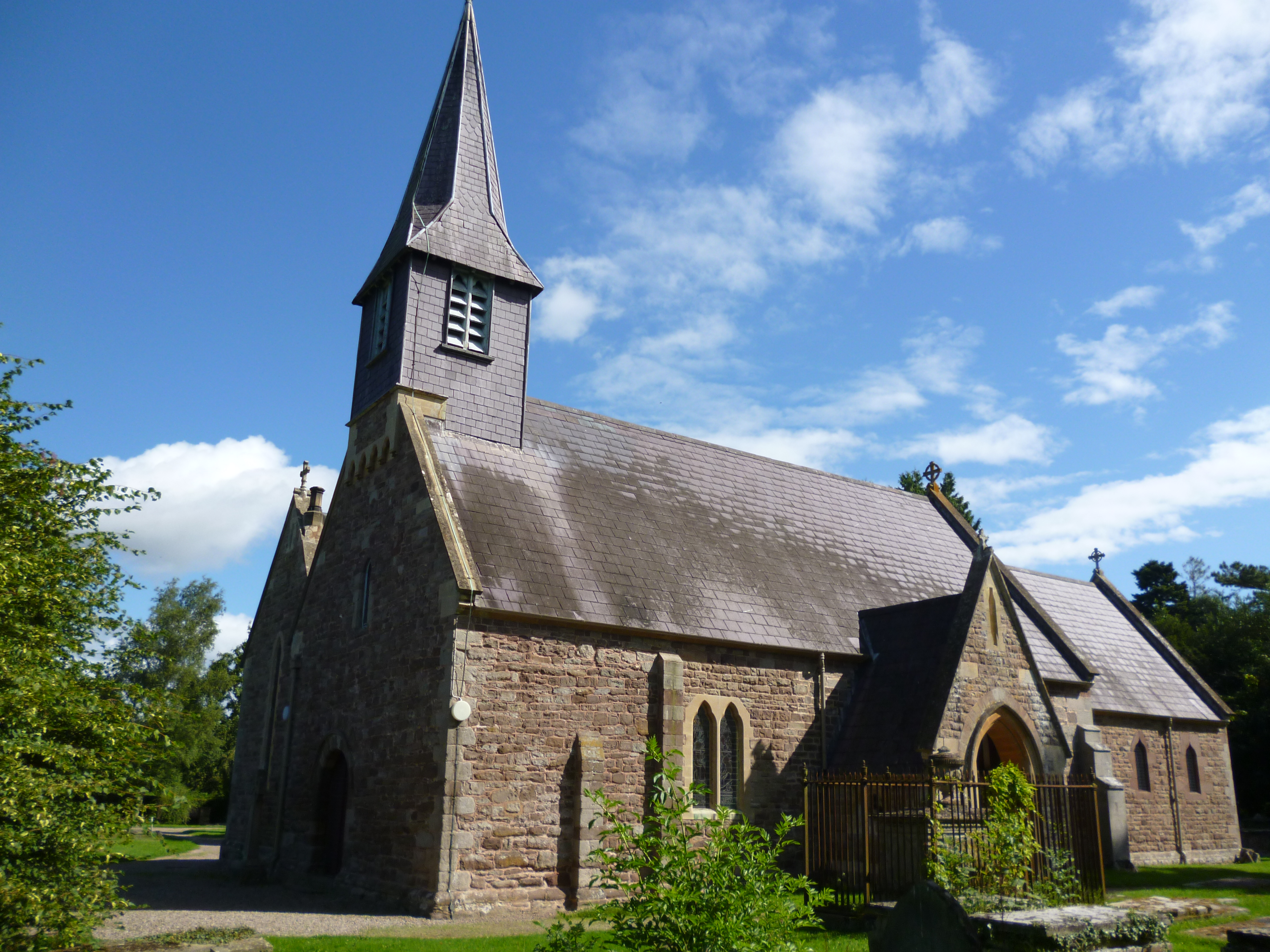
St. Michael's Church Breinton: close to the River Wye and the National Trust property of Breinton Springs

A mound with a moat, probably a moated building belonging to the Dean and Chapter of Hereford Cathedral around 1150, lies close to the Church at Breinton Springs (a National Trust property, SO 4726 3948). Nearby, the undulating ground in an orchard is thought to be a deserted medieval village, and a medieval settlement with 8 villagers at Warham is also mentioned. Other archaeological features that have been identified include trackways, ridge and furrow, and evidence of old irrigation leats on the meadows that flood, close to the River Wye. St. Michael's church originated around 1200 but was substantially rebuilt between 1866 and 1870 by F. R. Kempson, with architect James Cranston. A few Norman parts remain, including the west doorway. Churchyard memorials include those of Henry Graves Bull (major contributor to an encyclopedia of local apples and pears, the Herefordshire Pomona in 1884), Canon Charles Vincent Gorton (1854–1912, friend of Sir Edward Elgar), and Charles Dodgson (relative of Lewis Carroll, died 1941). More evidence of the historical ways of life is shown in the works of the artist Brian Hatton (1887–1916). Details of archaeological and historic features can be found in Herefordshire Historic Environment Record Database.

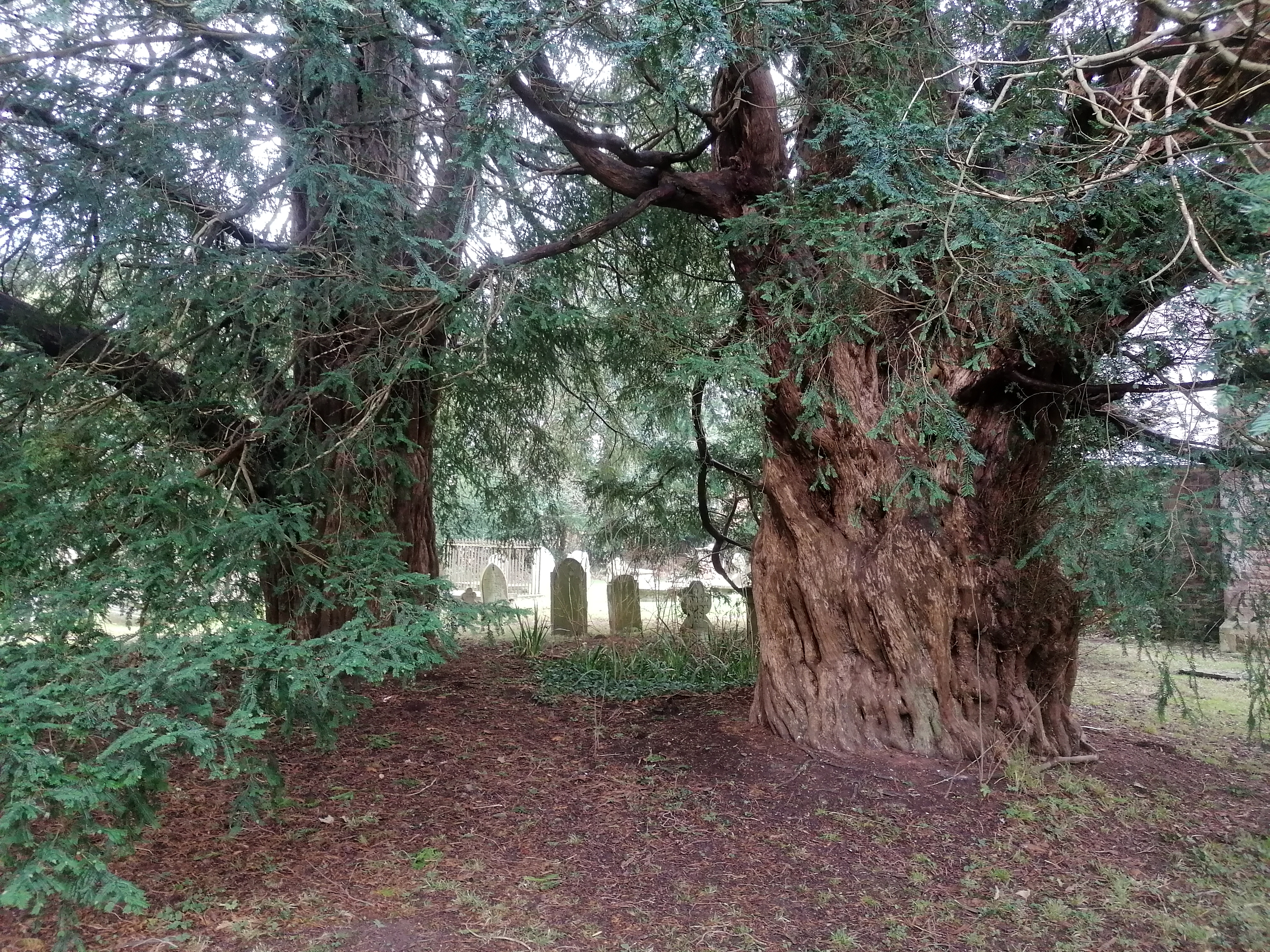
Yew Trees in the churchyard at St Michael's, Breinton

== Agriculture and horticulture ==
The fertile soils of Breinton have been important for agriculture and horticulture. Back in 1876 some of the best roses in the country were grown at Kings Acre Nurseries by Messrs. Cranston and Mayos, and Cranston's Nursery and Seed Co. Ltd. introduced new apples such as the King's Acre Pippin. There was a decline in orchards in the 1890s, but then Messrs. Bulmer developed varieties of cider apple and new techniques for orchard design and management. The Wyevale Nurseries, still present today, were established in 1932 by Harry Williamson, who pioneered the innovation of container-grown plants. The nurseries and fields of Breinton still yield a wide range of high quality plants and trees; dessert and cider apples and pears; and cereals, vegetables, and other crops.

== Natural history ==
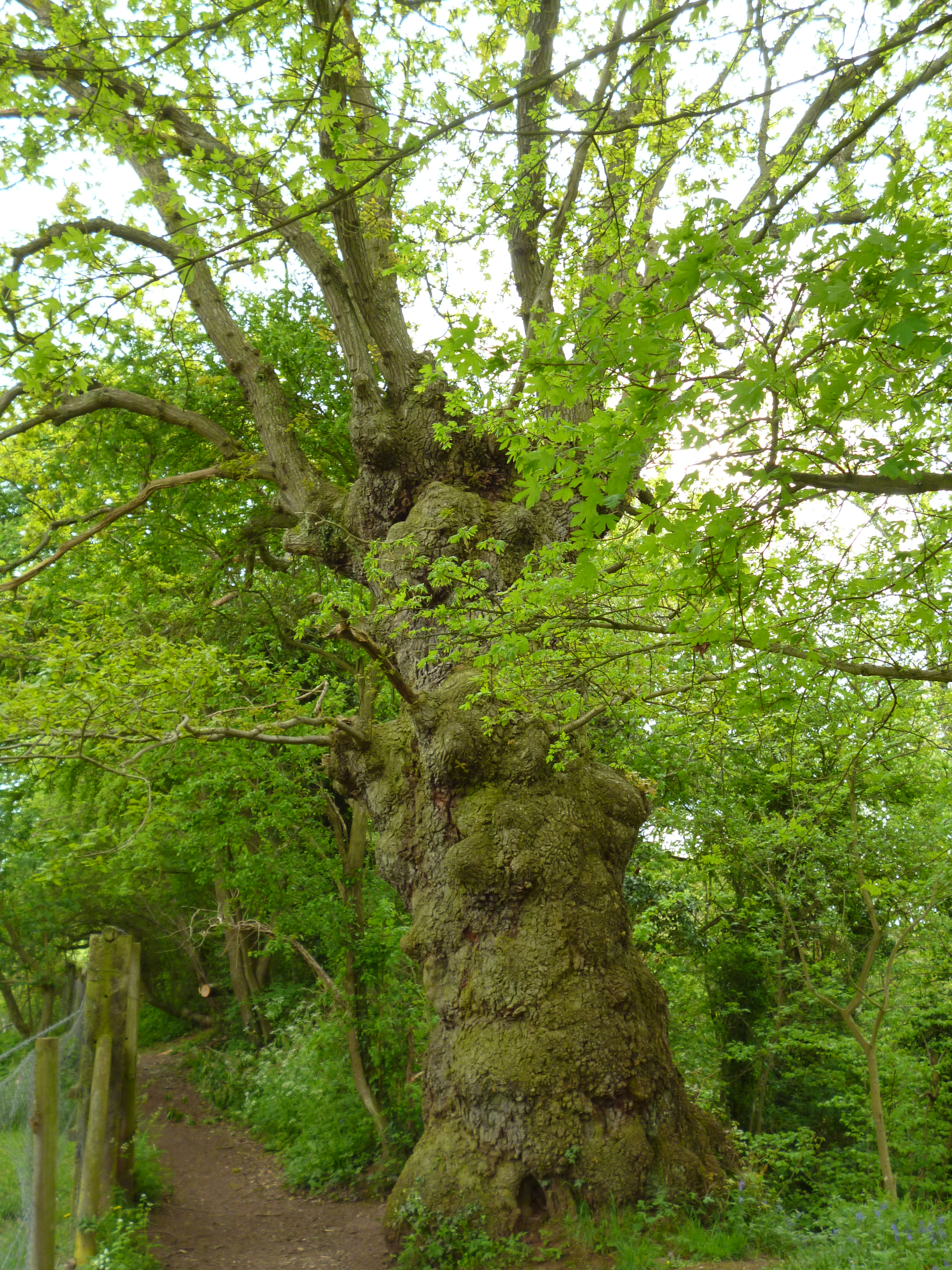
One of Breinton's ancient oak trees

Field boundary hedges show a rich flora, and there are many notable and veteran trees, particularly oak and ash; plus ancient yews close to St. Michael's church. Some areas have been woodland at least since the earliest maps, and some fields have an unusual variety of arable weeds, including the uncommon Shepherd's Needle. The orchards are home to many mammals, birds, and insects, including the rare Noble Chafer beetle.
