= Lower Bullingham =

Village in Herefordshire, England

Coordinates: 52.03°N 2.70°W

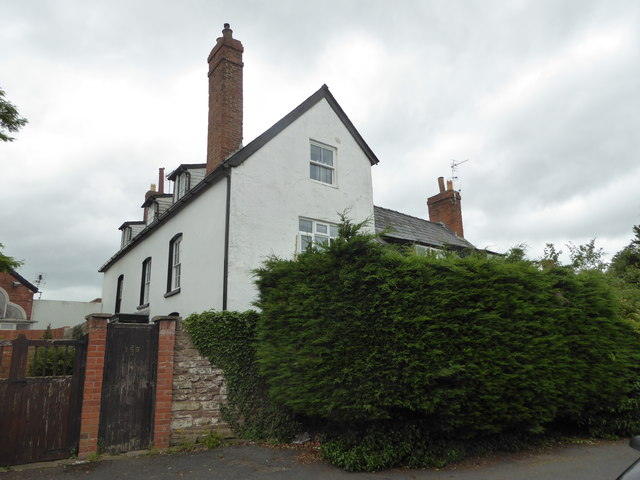
- Farmhouse

- Location within Herefordshire
- Population: 1,876 (2011 Census)
- OS grid reference: SO5237
- Civil parish: Lower Bullingham
- Unitary authority: Herefordshire
- Ceremonial county: Herefordshire
- Region: West Midlands
- Country: England
- Sovereign state: United Kingdom
- Post town: HEREFORD
- Postcode district: HR2
- Dialling code: 01432
- Police: West Mercia
- Fire: Hereford and Worcester
- Ambulance: West Midlands
- UK Parliament: Hereford and South Herefordshire

Lower Bullingham is a village and civil parish in Herefordshire, England. The main village, Lower Bullingham, is a south-eastern suburb of Hereford. The parish also extends into the countryside and takes in the hamlet of Green Crize.

In the early 1950s, the Polish Catholic Marian Fathers priesthood, mindful of the increasing number of school age children of Polish parentage in the UK post-World War II, set up a Polish boarding school at Lower Bullingham, on the outskirts of Hereford in buildings which had previously housed a convent. This was a junior boys' school and complemented a senior school established around the same time at Fawley Court, Henley-on-Thames. Boys from the Hereford-Lower Bullingham school would also attend the local English St Francis Xavier Catholic primary school during the day, located in the centre of Hereford.
