= Grafton, Herefordshire =

Village in Herefordshire, England

Coordinates: 52.030°N 2.734°W

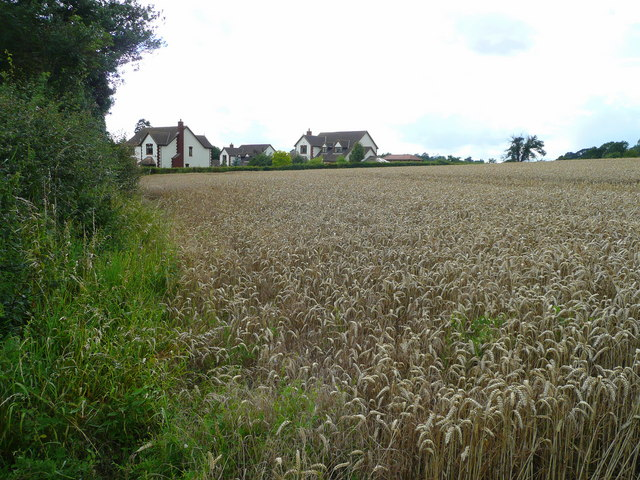
Wheat field looking towards development (2008)

Grafton is a village and civil parish in Herefordshire, England. The population of the civil parish was 258 at the 2011 census. The parish includes the villages of Grafton and Bullinghope, and is immediately to the south of Hereford city.

The origin of the place name comes from the Old English words graf and tun meaning 'a farmstead in or by a grove;' the place name appears as Crafton in 1303.
