= Preston Wynne =

Village in Herefordshire, United Kingdom

Coordinates: 52.11048°N 2.65851°W

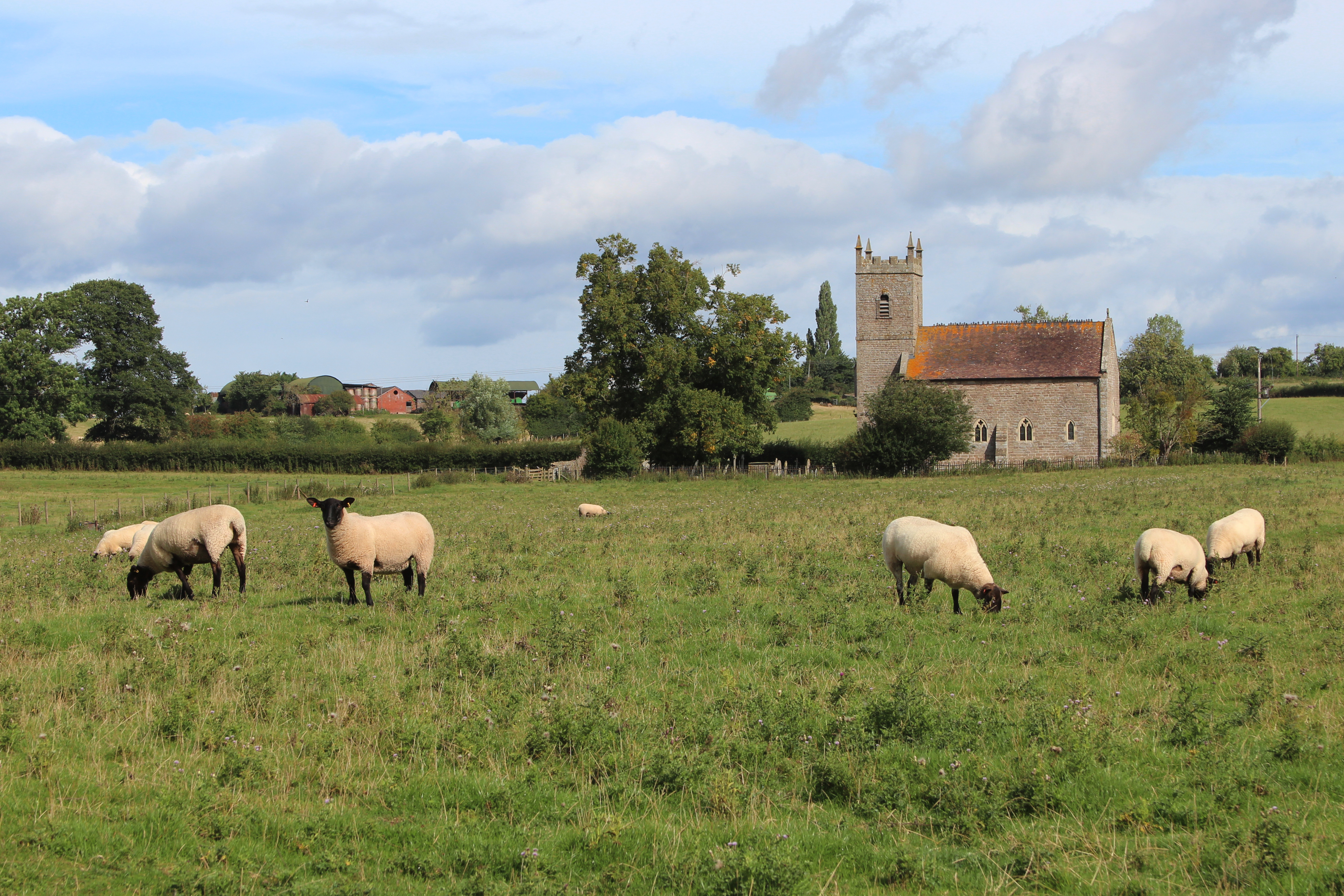
Holy Trinity Church from a distance

Preston Wynne is a small village and civil parish in Herefordshire, England. Civil parish population at the 2011 census was 172.

Preston Wynne is 5 miles (8.0 km) north-east from Hereford, and 8 miles (13 km) south-east from Leominster. The hamlet of Preston Marsh is to the east of the village. Within the parish is the site of a medieval chapel and ancient ring ditches.
