= Craswall =

Village in Herefordshire, England

Coordinates: 52°00′31″N 3°02′15″W

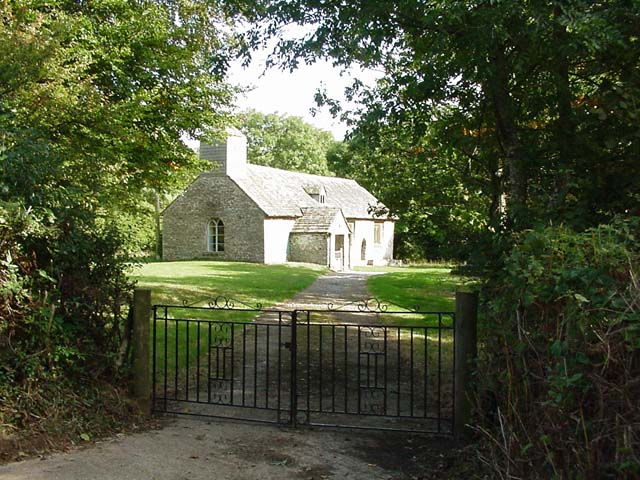
- Craswall Church

- Location within Herefordshire
- Population: 153 (2011 Census)
- District: Herefordshire
- Shire county: Herefordshire
- Region: West Midlands
- Country: England
- Sovereign state: United Kingdom
- Post town: Hereford
- Postcode district: HR2
- Police: West Mercia
- Fire: Hereford and Worcester
- Ambulance: West Midlands
- UK Parliament: Hereford and South Herefordshire

Craswall (historically also spelt Craswell, Crasswall and Crosswold) is a village and civil parish in Herefordshire, England. It lies in the far west of the county, in the foothills of the Black Mountains, close to the border with Wales.

Before 1536 Craswall was in the marcher lordship of Ewyas. Until 1866 it was a chapelry in the large parish of Clodock (until 1852 in the diocese of St Davids). It then became a separate civil parish.

The village is near the source of the River Monnow. Above the village is the Black Hill, the setting for Bruce Chatwin's novel On the Black Hill.

In the 2001 census the population of the civil parish was 147, increasing to 153 at the 2011 Census.
