= How Caple =

Village and civil parish in Herefordshire, England

Coordinates: 51.9715°N 2.5764°W

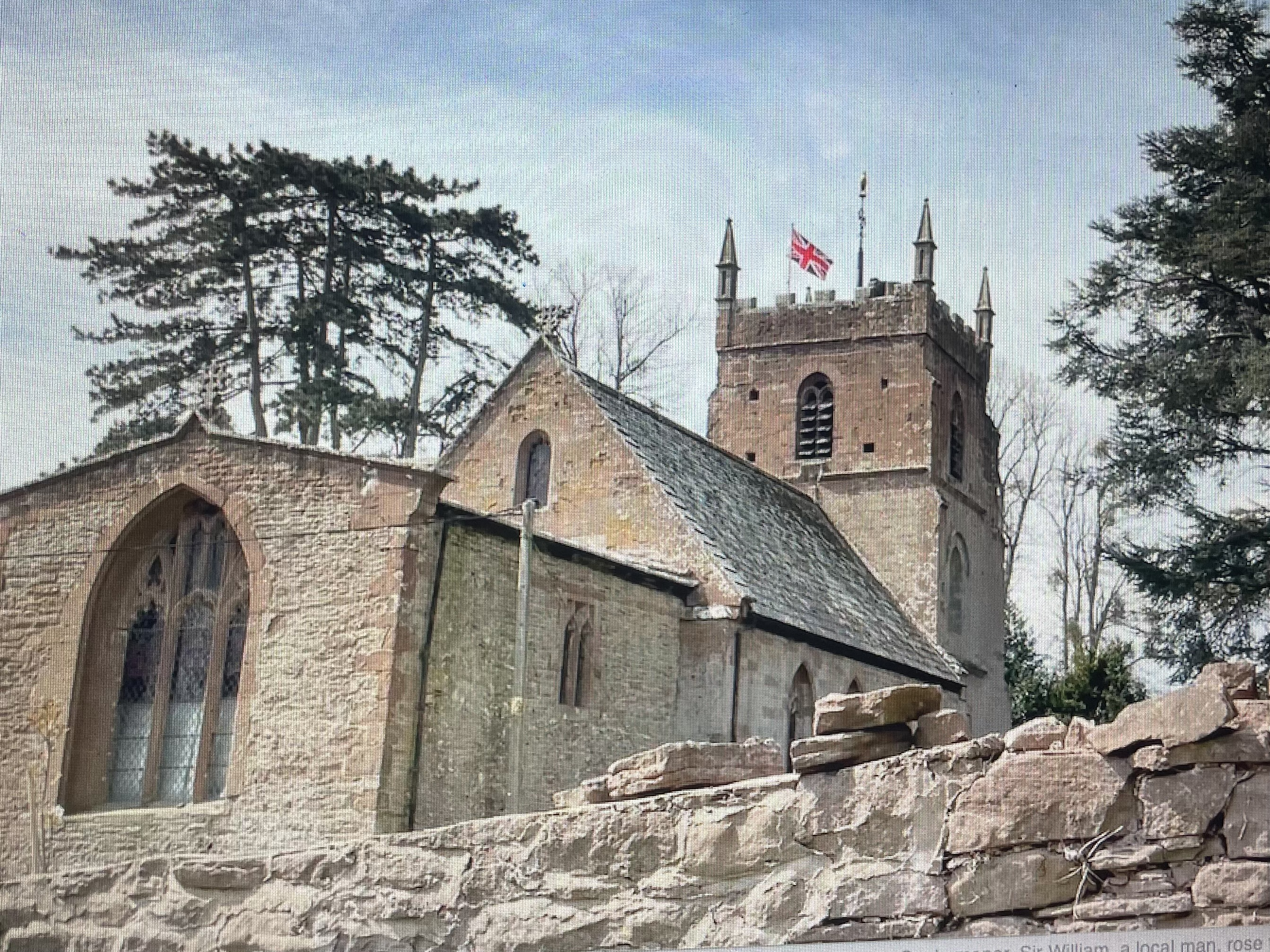
How Caple church

How Caple is a village and civil parish in the English county of Herefordshire. The population of this civil parish at the 2011 census was 118.

To the east of the village, on the main B4224 road, is the hamlet of Crossway. How Caple is mentioned in the Domesday Book of 1086.

== How Caple Church ==
How Caple church is more than 800 years old. The earliest parts of the church date to around 1210 but Roman artefacts suggest the existence of an even earlier temple. Rebuilding of the nave, chancel, and tower happened in 1693

The church’s features include an alleged plague stone outside, chancel corbels dating to the 1200s, a 14th century lavacrum, a reredos from 1918 depicting the last supper, and a diptych, possibly made in Germany, depicting eight religious scenes and acquired for How Caple church in 1870 from the Netherlands.

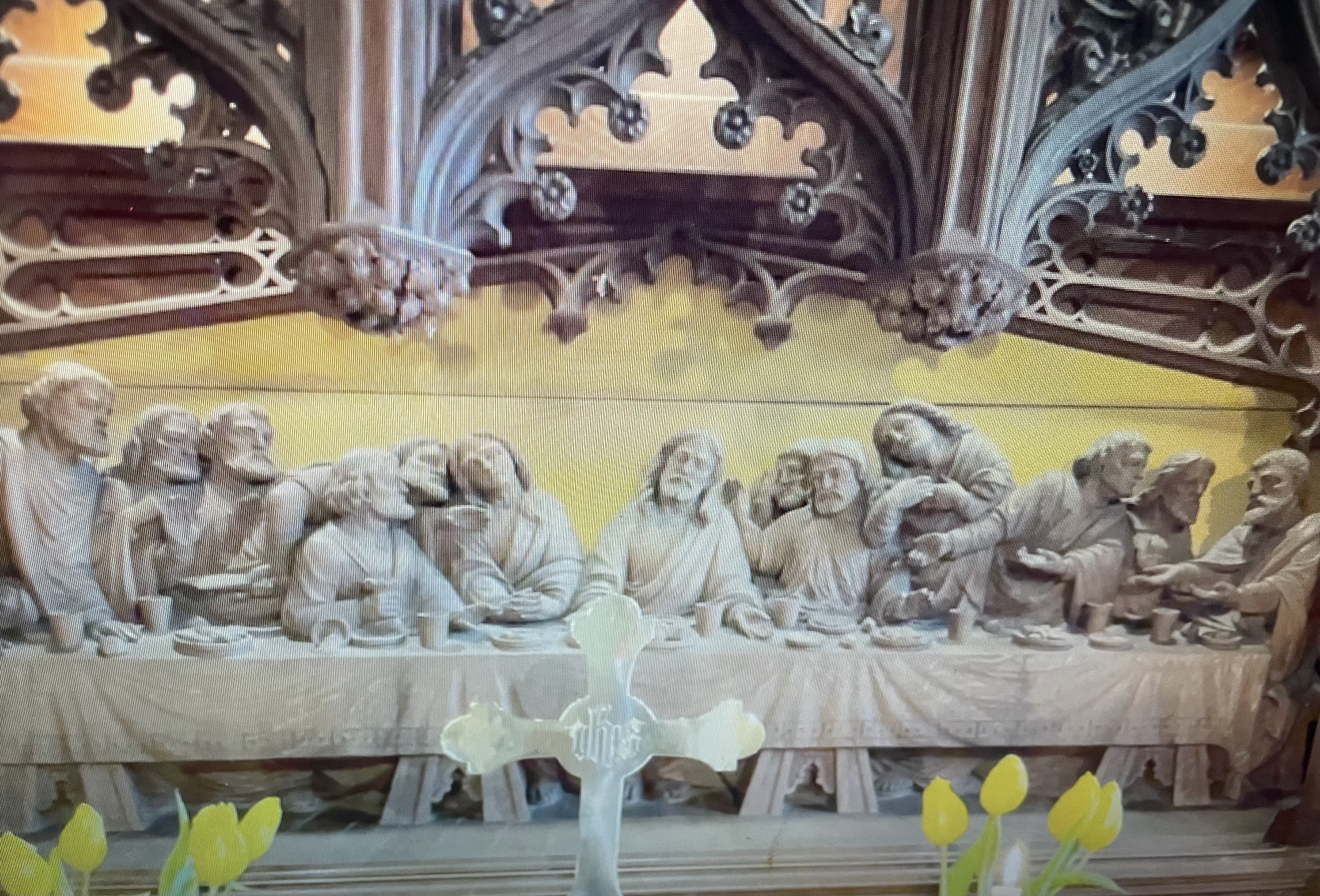
1918 reredos depicting the last supper

Between the chancel and the body of the church is a rood screen attributed to Grinling Gibbons.

The art historian Nikolaus Pevsner includes How Caple church in his “ The Buildings of England” Series, noting the acanthus decoration of the font that is now in the entrance, and confirming the main font as “Late Norman with haphazard vegetable and geometrical motifs”

The church has become popular for weddings.

=== The Gregory Chapel ===
The southern transept was built in 1693 by Sir William Gregory the lord of How Caple manor. Sir William, a local man, rose to become Speaker of the House of Commons. He helped to bring in the Habeas Corpus Act 1679.

The chapel has a stained glass window made by Frederick Preedy.

== How Caple Court and the Lee Family ==
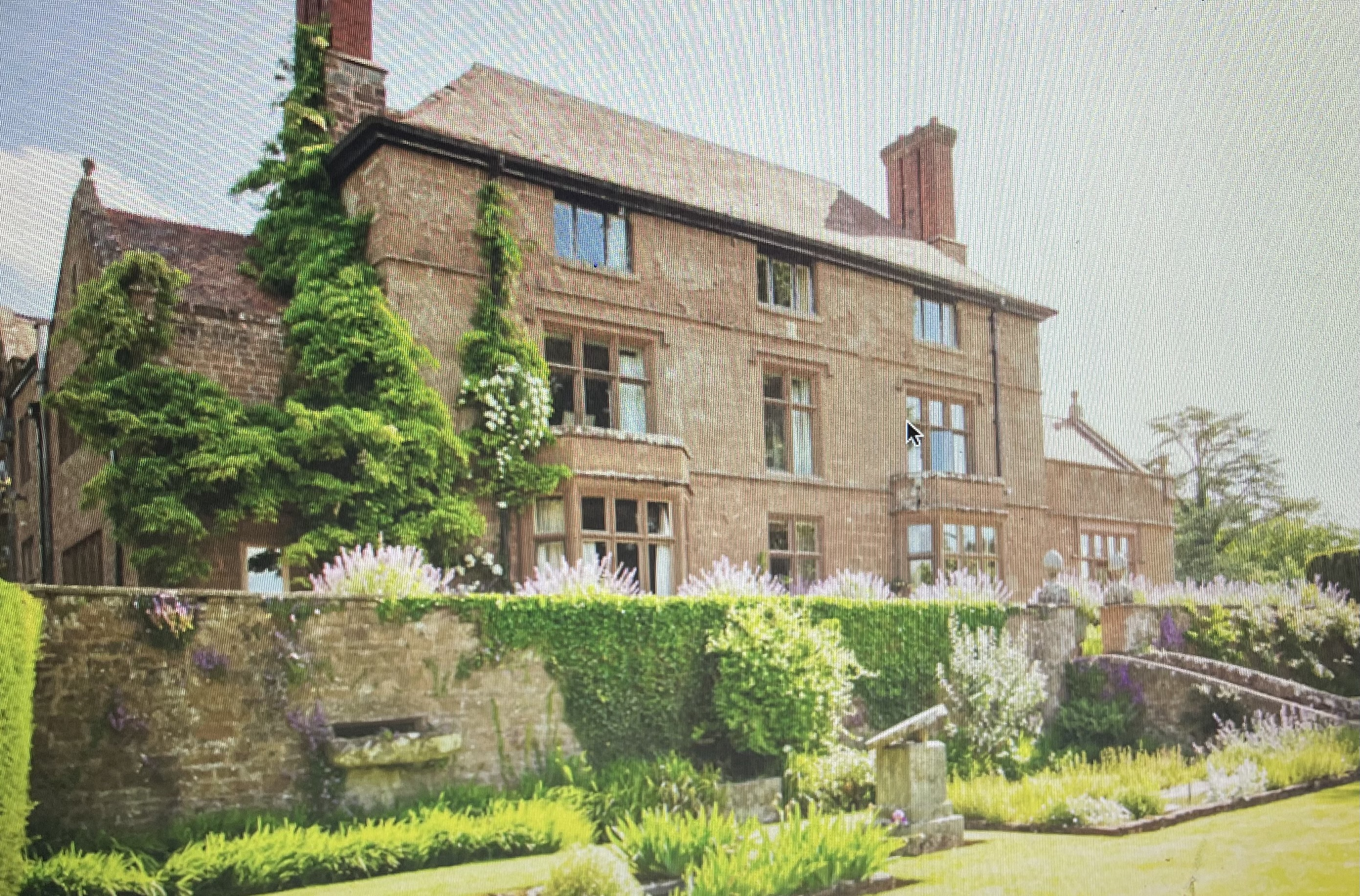
How Caple Court

One of the main benefactors of the church and village in the last hundred years have been the Lees, owners of How Caple Court. Changes they have made to the church include a reordering of the main entrance from the southern porch to the west door.

== Notable people ==
Quentin Letts, writer and journalist. Lives with his family in How Caple.
