= Garway =

Village in Herefordshire, England

Coordinates: 51.89746°N 2.79491°W

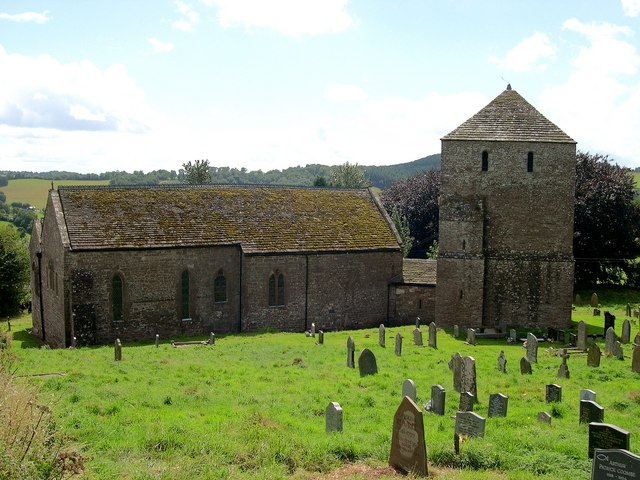
- The Church of St Michael at Garway

- Location within Herefordshire
- Population: 430
- OS grid reference: SO454224
- Civil parish: Garway
- Unitary authority: Herefordshire
- Ceremonial county: Herefordshire
- Region: West Midlands
- Country: England
- Sovereign state: United Kingdom
- Post town: HEREFORD
- Postcode district: HR2
- Dialling code: 01981
- Police: West Mercia
- Fire: Hereford and Worcester
- Ambulance: West Midlands
- UK Parliament: Hereford and South Herefordshire

Garway is a civil parish in south-west Herefordshire, England. The population of the civil parish was 430 at the 2011 census. It is set on a hillside above the River Monnow, and is approximately 11 miles west of Ross-on-Wye, and approximately 13 miles south of Hereford, the county town. It is a sparsely populated area, mainly agricultural in nature. There are several small centres of population including Garway itself, Broad Oak, The Turning and Garway Hill.

== Garway church ==
The church is on the western edge of the parish and is dedicated to Saint Michael. The earliest record of a monastery on the site is in the seventh century, but it is with the arrival of the Knights Templar in 1180 that the history of the church at Garway becomes clearer. The Knights Templar built a hut in honour of the Holy Sepulchre in Jerusalem. Brooks and Pevsner, in the 2012 revision to the Herefordshire volume of the Buildings of England, describe St Michael's as "uncommonly interesting".

The excavated foundations of part of the round church (unearthed in 1927) can be seen clearly on the north side of the present church, and the original carved chancel arch, heavily decorated and in the Norman style, survives. Most of the current church, which is no longer round, is probably 13th century including the massive defensible tower which was once separate from the main church building. There are numerous carvings both inside and outside the building including a Green Man, a sword believed to be Templar, a fish and a snake.

=== Garway Dovecote ===
Garway Dovecote, on private land near Garway Church, has an inscription dating it to 1326. Both the dovecote and the church are Grade I listed buildings.

== Media ==
The dovecote featured in the BBC1 series Bonekickers on 8 July 2008. Garway is referenced in The Fabric of Sin, a novel by Phil Rickman, and in Bernard Knight's chapter in King Arthur's Bones by The Medieval Murderers.

== Gallery ==
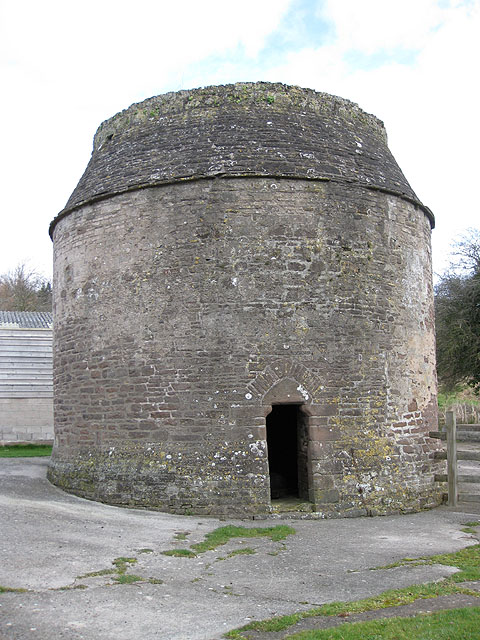
Garway Dovecote

Garway Church Green Man carved In sandstone

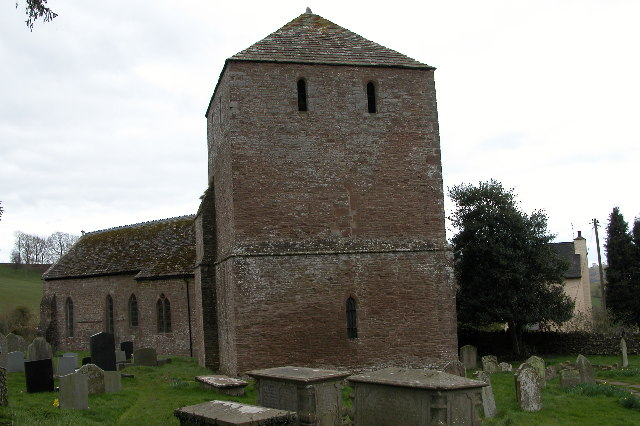
St Michael's Church with its castle-like tower

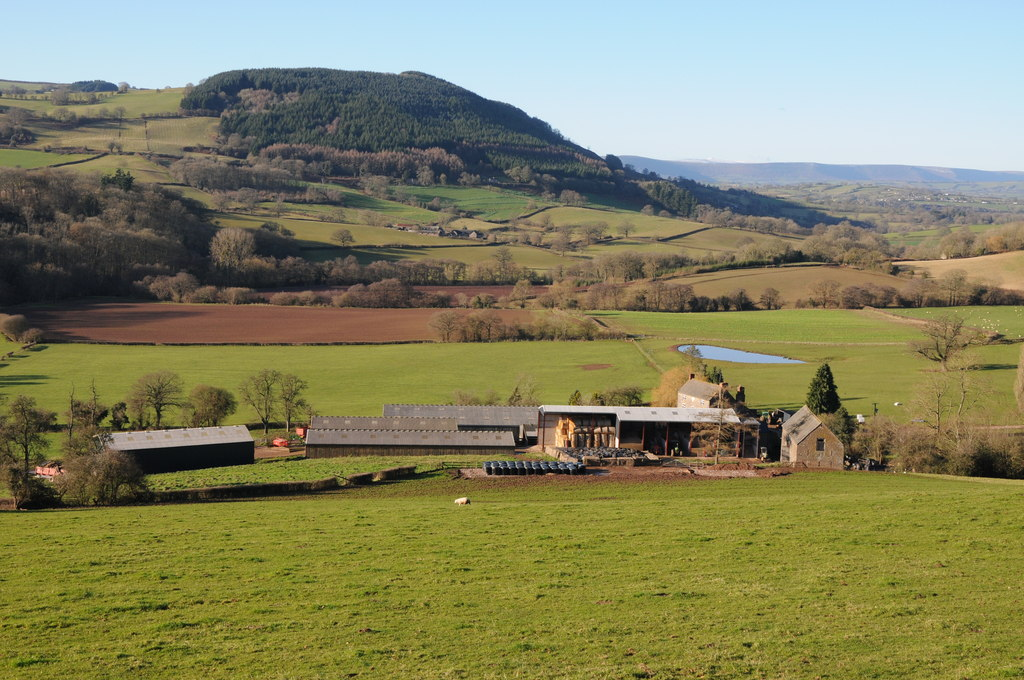
Great Demesne, Garway

== Sources ==
- Brooks, Alan; Pevsner, Nikolaus (2012). Herefordshire. The Buildings of England. New Haven, US and London: Yale University Press. ISBN 978-0-300-12575-7. OCLC 759174126.
