= Clehonger =

Village in Herefordshire, England

Coordinates: 52.033°N 2.803°W

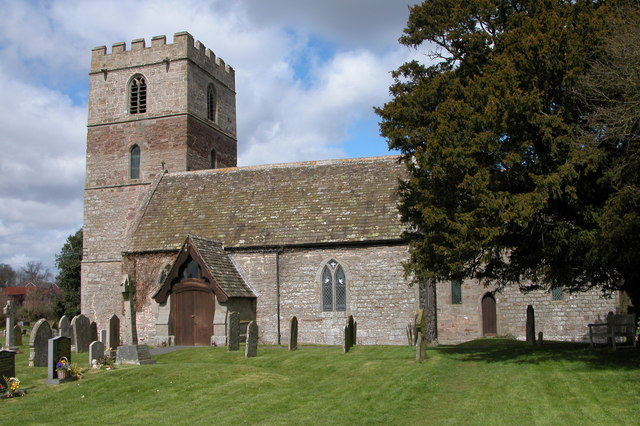
- All Saints' Church, Clehonger

- Location within Herefordshire
- Population: 1,382 (2011 Census)
- Unitary authority: Herefordshire
- Shire county: Herefordshire
- Region: West Midlands
- Country: England
- Sovereign state: United Kingdom
- Post town: Hereford
- Postcode district: HR2
- Police: West Mercia
- Fire: Hereford and Worcester
- Ambulance: West Midlands
- UK Parliament: Hereford and South Herefordshire

Clehonger (/ˈkliːhɒŋɡər/) is a village and civil parish in Herefordshire, England, and 7 km (4.3 mi) south-west of Hereford.

Clehonger is from the old English 'Clayey wooded slope.' The population of the civil parish at the 2011 census was 1,382.

== Community ==
Apart from the occasional farm cottage or farmhouse, most housing in the village is predominantly a mix of post First World War council housing, and mid-1960s to 1980s buildings. The post World War II housing is mainly near the north side of the village, while the 1970s and 1980s housing was built on the south and west. Mid-1960s housing occupies the centre of the village. In the 1970 and 1980s, bungalows and dormers proliferated while the 1960s housing is the more traditional three or four bedroom semi-detached type. A petrol station was closed around 2000, demolished, and the land used for housing in 2001.

Clehonger has a small shop with post office and a village hall. The village school, which includes a pre-school for 2 year olds and up, for 5–11 year olds, accommodates approximately 130-150 pupils, its catchment area including Belmont (a suburb of Hereford), 2 miles away. Broadband services became available in the village from June 2005. The village pub, The Seven Stars, was one of the first pubs in Herefordshire to have a petanque piste.

The 12th-century parish church, dedicated to All Saints, is a Grade I listed building significant for its monuments to the local Pembridge manorial family.

The major road link is the B4349, which passes through the middle of the village. There are a number of bus routes which serve the village, notably the 449 service to Hereford from Madley, which runs every hour Monday to Saturday. On Sundays, Yeomans operate the 39A "Hay Ho" bus route to Hay-On-Wye from Hereford via Kingstone. Additionally, Yeomans operate a Tuesday-only bus service, number 442, from Clehonger to Abergavenny. Yeomans bus routes 447, 440 and 448 also serve the village. From 2025, Sargeants Brothers have operated a new X44 bus service from Hereford to Brecon via Clehonger village. This service replaced Traws Cymru/Stagecoach T14 service.

In 1870 Richard Ridler, farmer at Clehonger Manor Farm, began making cider commercially with his son Richard E Rider. This business grew, and a cider works was built opposite the farm house — where The Pippins housing development now lies. This firm was taken over by Evans's Cider Company of Hereford just after the Second World War, and eventually this was absorbed by Bulmer's — and closed.
