= Church of St Mary and St David, Kilpeck =

Coordinates: 51.9703°N 2.8092°W

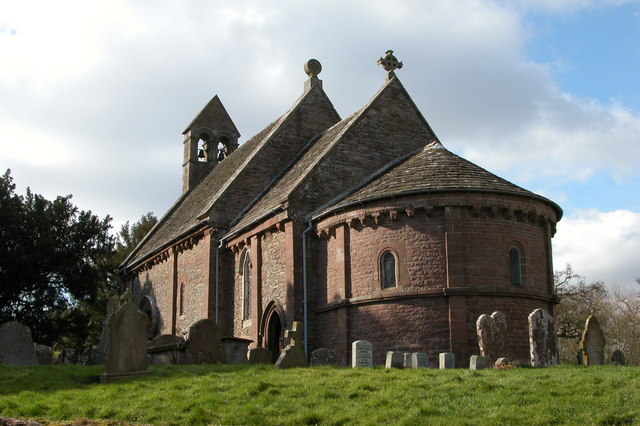
- Kilpeck Church

- Location in Herefordshire
- OS grid reference: SO 44510 30514
- Location: Kilpeck, Herefordshire
- Country: England (previously Wales)
- Denomination: Church of England
- Website: kilpeckchurch.org.uk

History
- Dedication: St Mary; St David

Architecture
- Years built: c. 1140

Administration
- Province: Canterbury
- Diocese: Hereford
- Parish: Parish of Kilpeck

Clergy
- Vicar: Revd Ashley Evans

The Church of St Mary and St David is a Church of England parish church at Kilpeck in the English county of Herefordshire, about 5 miles from the border with Monmouthshire, Wales. Pevsner describes Kilpeck as "one of the most perfect Norman churches in England". Famous for its stone carvings, the church is a Grade I listed building.

== History ==
The church was built around 1140, and almost certainly before 1143 when it was given to the Abbey of Gloucester. It may have replaced an earlier Saxon church at the same site, and the oval raised form of the churchyard is typical of even older Celtic foundations. Around the 6th and 7th centuries the Kilpeck (Welsh: Llanddewi Cil Peddeg) area was within the British kingdom of Ergyng, which maintained Christian traditions dating back to the late Roman period. The possibility of the site holding Roman and even megalithic remains has been raised, but is unproven.

The plan of the church, with a nave, chancel, and semicircular apse, is typical for the time of its construction, the Norman period. It was originally dedicated to a St David, probably a local Celtic holy man, and later acquired an additional dedication to Mary from the chapel at Kilpeck Castle after it had fallen into disrepair. At the time the current church was built, the area around Kilpeck, known as Archenfield, was relatively prosperous and strategically important, in the heart of the Welsh Marches. The economic decline of the area after the 14th century may have helped preserve features which would have been removed elsewhere. However, it is unclear why the carvings were not defaced by Puritans in the 17th century. The church was substantially repaired in 1864, 1898 and 1962, and its unique features were protected and maintained. Pevsner describes the Victorian restorations, firstly by Lewis Nockalls Cottingham and latterly by John Pollard Seddon as "competent [and] disciplined".

== Architecture and carvings ==
The church is considered to be "the jewel of the Herefordshire school of Romanesque sculpture; for its completeness, its virtuosity and its remarkable state of preservation." The carvings in the local red sandstone are remarkable for their number and their fine state of preservation, particularly round the south door, the west window, and along a row of corbels which run right around the exterior of the church under the eaves. The carvings are all original and in their original positions. They have been attributed to a Herefordshire School of stonemasons, probably local but who may have been instructed by master masons recruited in France by Oliver de Merlimond. He was steward to the Lord of Wigmore, Hugh Mortimer, who went on a pilgrimage to Santiago de Compostela in Spain and, on his return, built a church with similar Romanesque carvings (now largely lost) at Shobdon, 30 miles (48 km) north of Kilpeck. Hugh de Kilpeck, a relative of Earl Mortimer, employed the same builders at Kilpeck, and their work is also known at Leominster, Rowlestone and elsewhere. The writer Simon Jenkins notes the influences of churches found on the pilgrimage routes of Northern Europe.

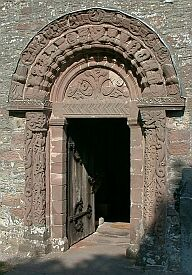
South doorway

The south doorway has a Tree of life tympanum. It has jambs which are intricately carved and double columns. The outer columns have carvings of a series of snakes, heads swallowing tails. In common with most of the other carvings, the meaning of these is unclear, but they may represent rebirth via the snake's seasonal sloughing of its skin. The inner right column shows birds in foliage; at the top of the right columns is a green man. The inner left column has two warriors who, unusually, are in loose trousers. The outer sections of the arch above the doorway show creatures which can be interpreted as a manticore and a basilisk, and various other mythical and actual birds and beasts.

For many years the south doorway was hidden by a wooden porch, but this was removed in 1868 revealing the carvings.. Although this has left the doorway exposed to the elements, the sandstone is exceptionally robust, and its condition is carefully monitored. In 1968 a narrow protruding strip of lead was let into the mortar above the arch to protect the carvings from water running down the wall above.

Eighty-five corbels survive, one fewer than are illustrated by Lewis in 1842. Originally there were 91. The meaning of most is obscure, but some probably come from a bestiary, and they include a Sheela na Gig.

Two green men appear as capitals on the richly decorated columns of the west window. In the centre of the corbel table below the window, and at each corner of the nave's west wall, are large protruding dragons' heads with coiled tongues. Each of the three mouths gapes to a different degree, rather like an animated sequence evenly spaced across the western facade. (A fourth dragon head, on the south-east corner of the nave, is broken.)

Inside the church, the chancel arch is also richly carved, though far less spectacular than the south doorway. Its carved figures are said to have been inspired by those on the "Puerta de las Platerias" at Santiago de Compostela. Both Pevsner and Jenkins suggest Ferrara Cathedral as a closer inspiration. The ceiling boss or keystone of the apse depicts four lions' heads. There is a massive baptismal font of polished conglomerate, a curious holy water stoup, shaped like a fat, tightly girdled torso (brought from a chapel near Wormbridge), and a rare Romanesque font-stopper. Jenkins suggests that the stoup represents a woman in pregnancy.

A very simple belfry now rises from the roof; although its design is in keeping with that of the rest of the church, it is a 19th-century addition. Elsewhere too, the restoration and necessary modernization of the church have conserved it well. The church is a Grade I listed building.

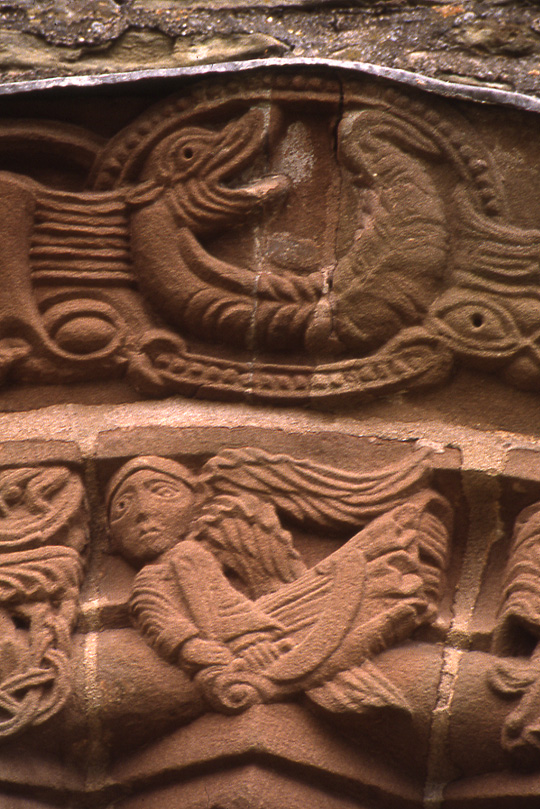
An angel appears in the centre of the arch above the south door.

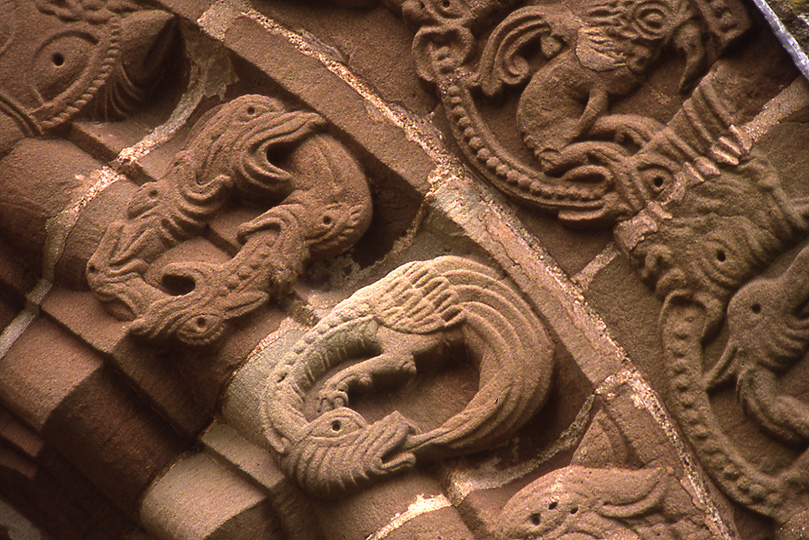
Other details of the arch include serpents and dragons swallowing their tails (see Ouroboros).

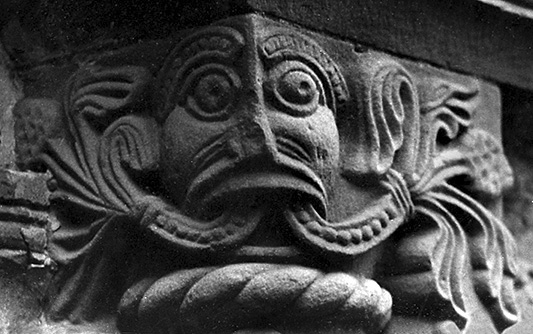
The "green man" on the capital of the columns to the east side of the south door>

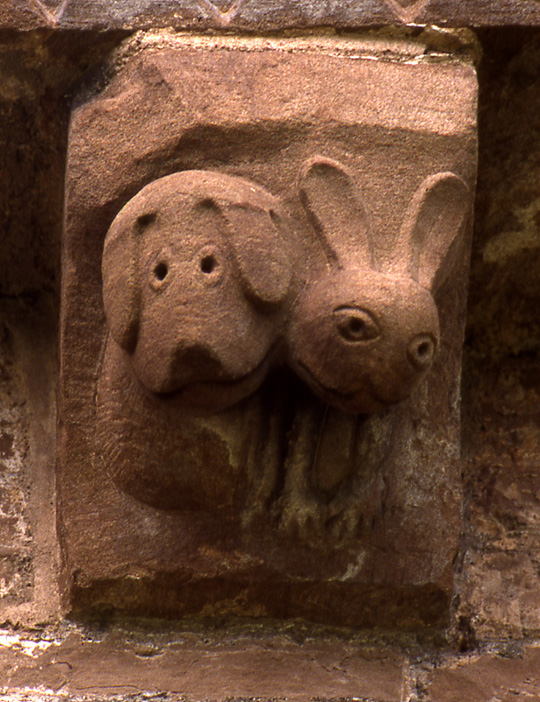
One corbel shows a hound and hare.

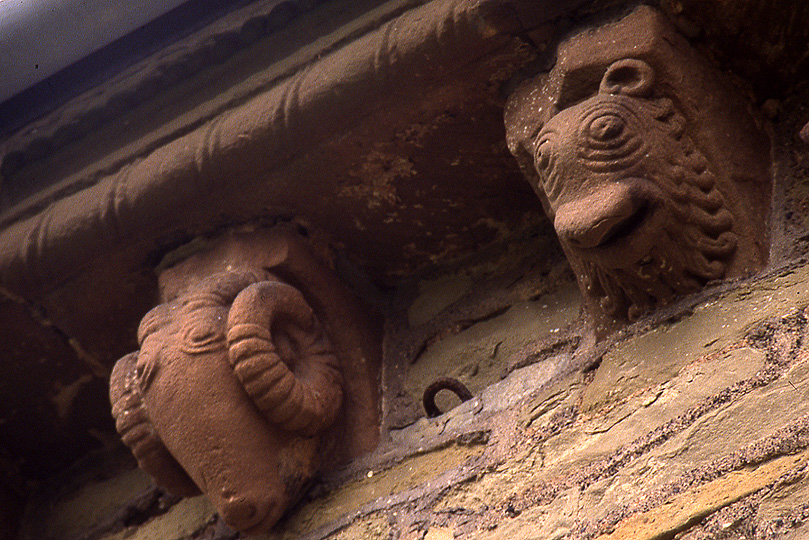
Two corbels, depicting a ram and a lion

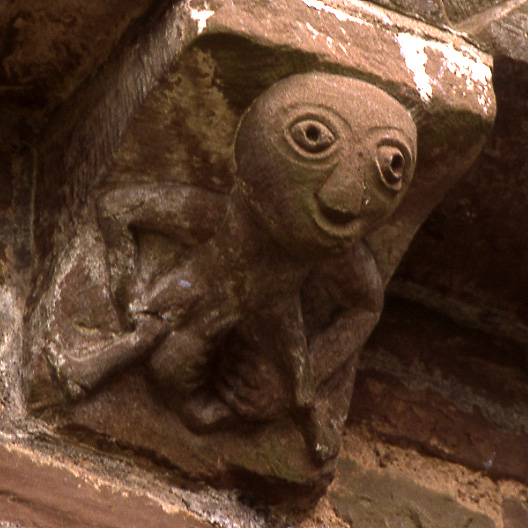
The famous sheela na gig

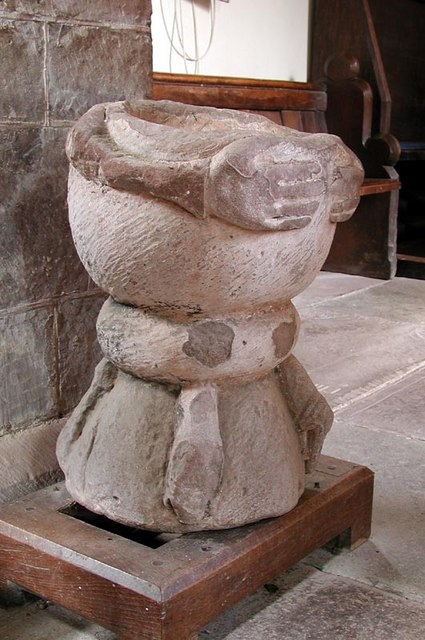
The carved stoup, brought from Wormbridge

== Churchyard ==
The churchyard contains the war grave of a World War II King's Shropshire Light Infantry officer, west of the church.

== In literature ==
The church is the subject of the short story Sheela-na-Gig by British poet, novelist and filmmaker B. S. Johnson.

Jeff Nuttall, in his 1954 unpublished Masters thesis, The Church of St. Mary & St. David Kilpeck, concluded that: "My intended detachment was completely destroyed. The building refused to be seen as an arrangement in stone, as the key to a time and a tradition, or as a piece in the jig-saw puzzle of art history. It stood unavoidably as a work of art, the timeless expression of a vision experienced under that same sun which now winked at me through the deep yew tree."

The carving is the subject of the poem "Sheila Na Gig at Kilpeck" by Gillian Clarke, and appears in the poet's collection Letter from a Far Country.

== Sources ==
- Bailey, James. The parish church of St Mary and St David at Kilpeck. 2000. A booklet, available within the church, that describes the church. No publisher is specified.
- Brooks, Alan; Pevsner, Nikolaus (2012). Herefordshire. The Buildings of England. Yale University Press. ISBN 978-0-300-12575-7.
- Jenkins, Simon (1999). England's Thousand Best Churches. Penguin. ISBN 0-713-99281-6.
- Lewis, G[eorge] R. "Illustrations of Kilpeck church, Herefordshire." 1979. Pamphlet derived from a book of 1842.
