= Herefordshire School =

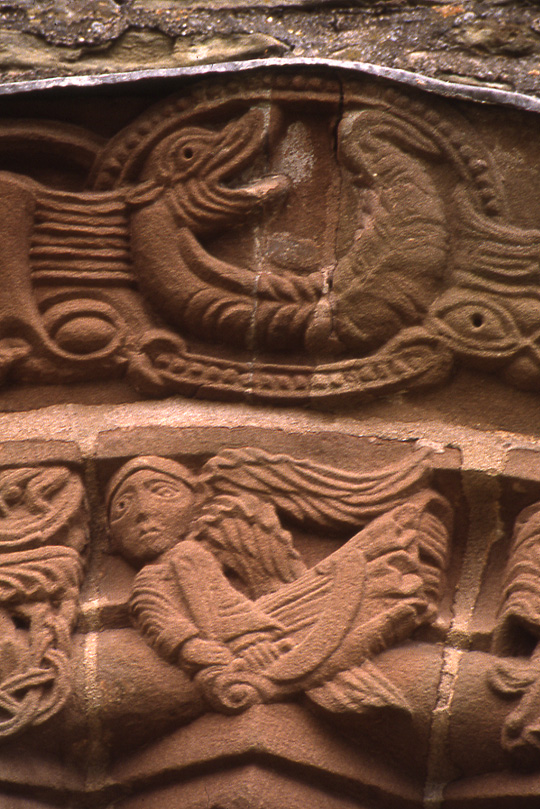
A serpent and an angel on the arch above the south door at Church of St Mary and St David, Kilpeck

The Herefordshire School is the name of a hypothetical group of master masons working in Herefordshire and Worcestershire (in England) during the 12th century. The name was coined by Polish-English scholar George Zarnecki. Their distinctive Romanesque sandstone and limestone carvings are to be found in several parish churches in the area, most notably Kilpeck, but also Eardisley, Shobdon and Castle Frome in Herefordshire, and Rock, Worcestershire. Their work draws on a variety of cultural sources for its religious and mystical images; Norman military figures, Anglo-Saxon animals, and Celtic abstract patterns combine to create a unique and beautiful synthesis. Despite its overtly religious nature, Herefordshire School work also has a playful, occasionally bawdy approach.

== Carvings at Kilpeck Church ==
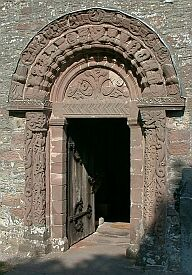
South door

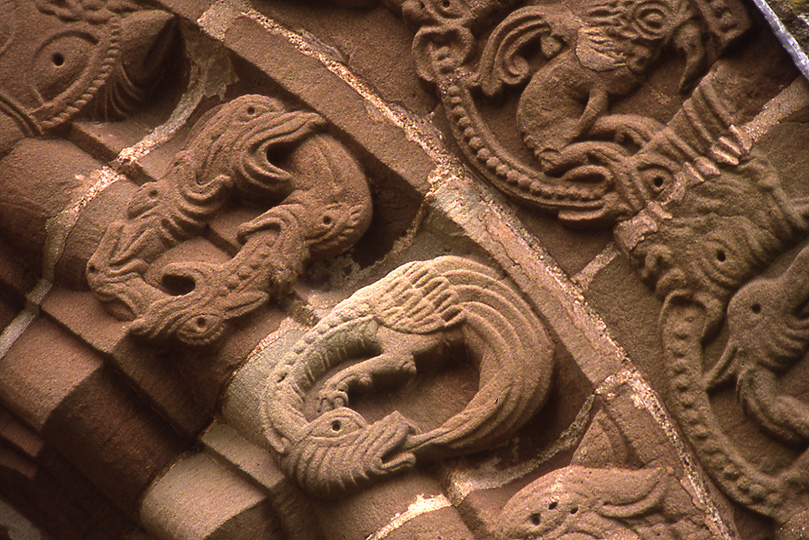
Other details of the arch include serpents and dragons swallowing their tails (see Ouroboros)

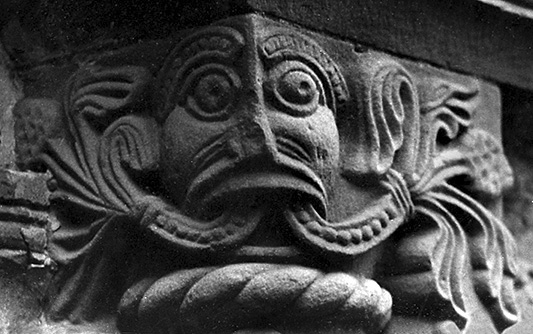
The "green man" on the capital of the columns to the east side of the south door

== Sources ==
- Thurlby, Malcolm (1999). The Herefordshire School of Romanesque Sculpture.
