= Kilpeck Priory =

Benedictine priory in Herefordshire, England

Coordinates: 51.9680°N 2.8036°W

Kilpeck Priory was a Benedictine priory in Kilpeck, Herefordshire, England, at grid reference SO448303.

In 1134, William, son of Norman, gave the church of St David, Kilpeck, and the Chapel of St Mary to Gloucester Abbey, and a Priory cell was established about 400 yards South East of the church, to house some monks displaced from Llanthony Priory by attacks of the Welsh. In 1428 the church was united to Gloucester.

In 1320, there was a chantry chapel in the forest of Treville, Herefordshire, and its control was later disputed between Sir Baldwill of Trevville and the Prior of Kilpeck Priory.

Members of the archaeology section of the Woolhope Naturalists' Field Club visited the site on 18 March 1979. Earthworks lie about seventy yards to the SSW of Priory Farm and are a slight platform and banks, so maybe the remains of the priory. The ground slopes away to the SW of the farmhouse and there appears to be a fishpond towards the lower part of the slope, now dry.
