= Baron Delamer =

Baron Delamer is a title that has been created twice in British history:

- Booth baronets, created in 1661
- Earl of Stamford, created in 1796

== See also ==
- Baron Delamere
- Delamere (disambiguation)
