= Corbel =

Piece of masonry jutting out of a wall to carry any superincumbent weight

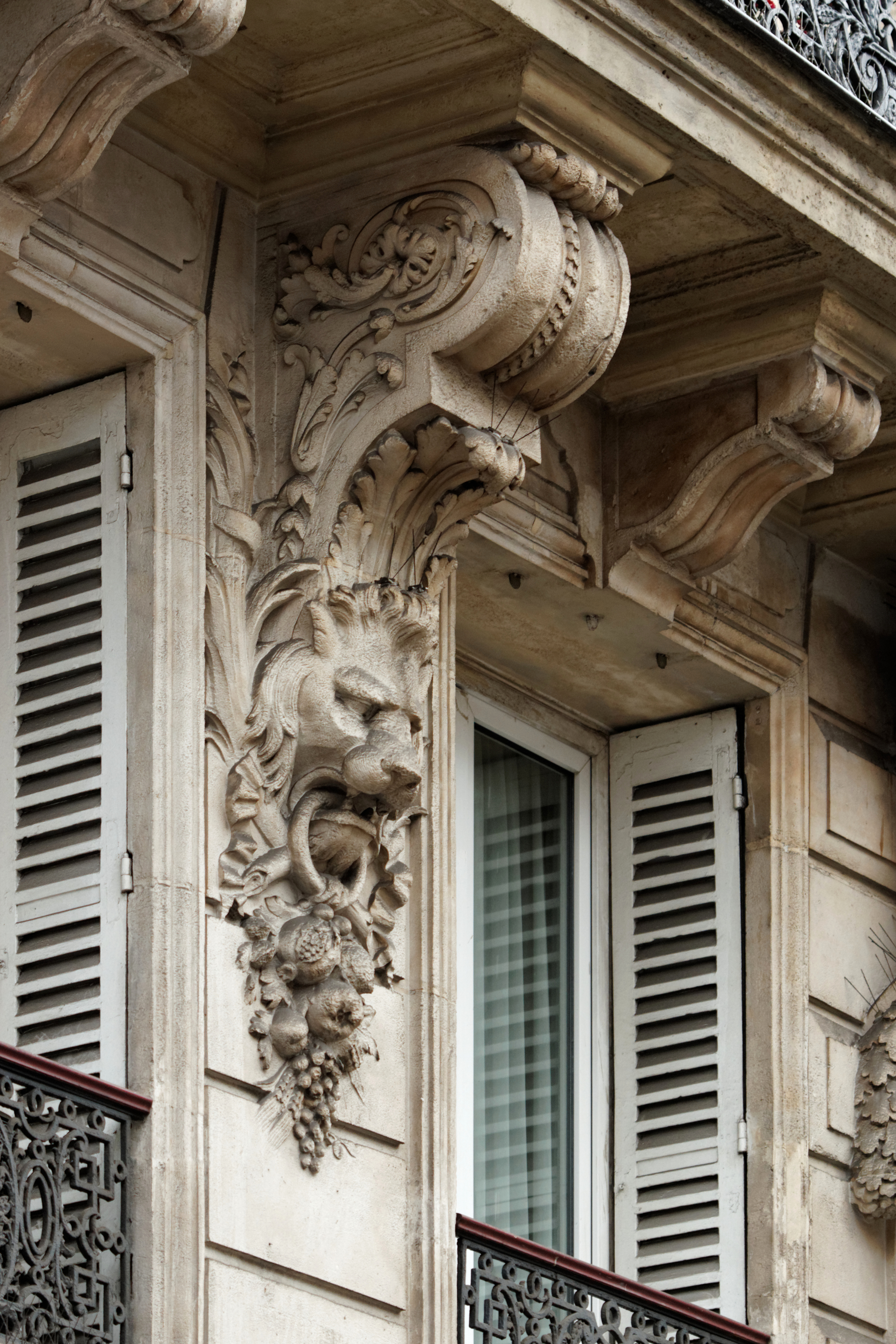
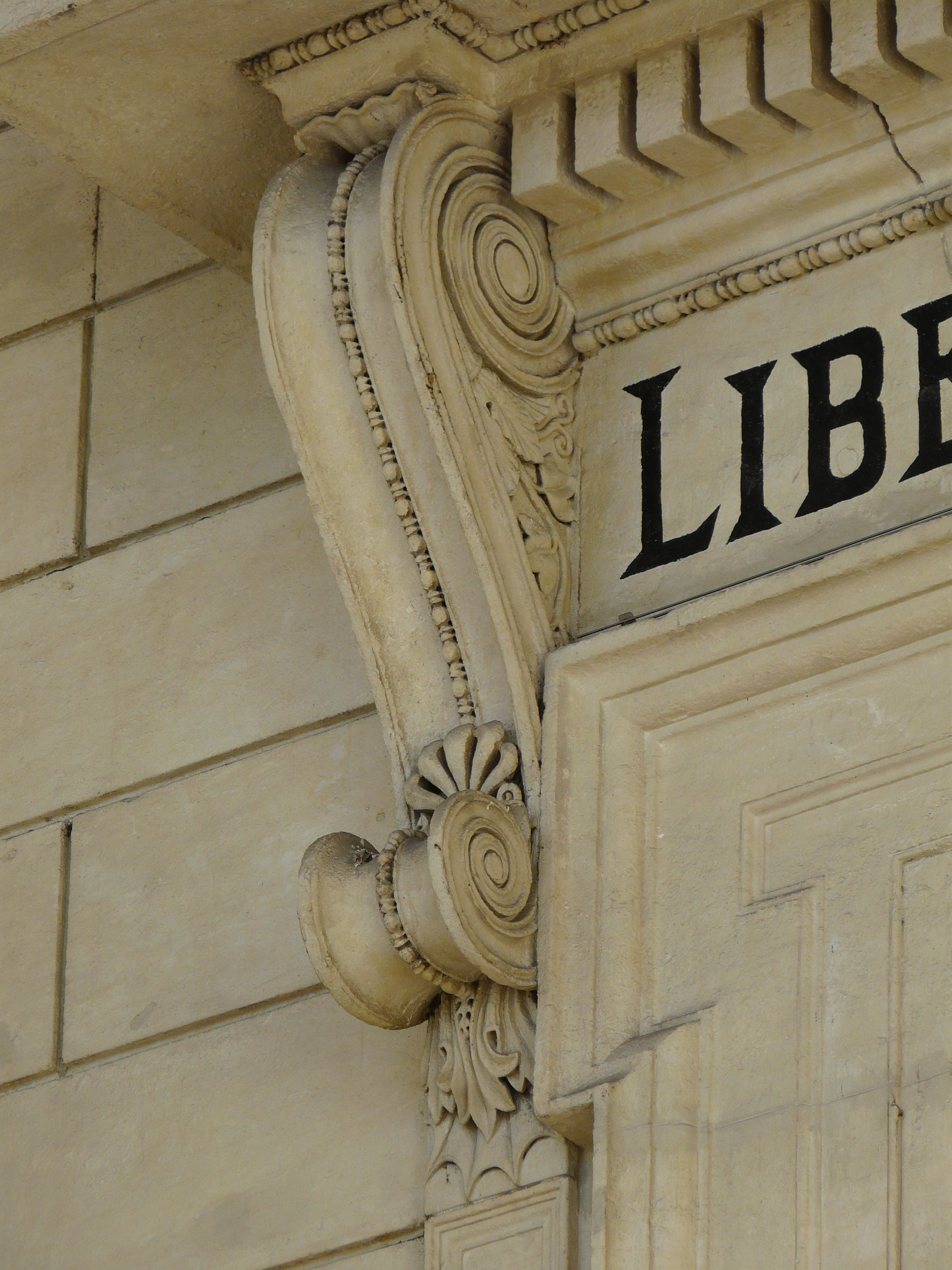
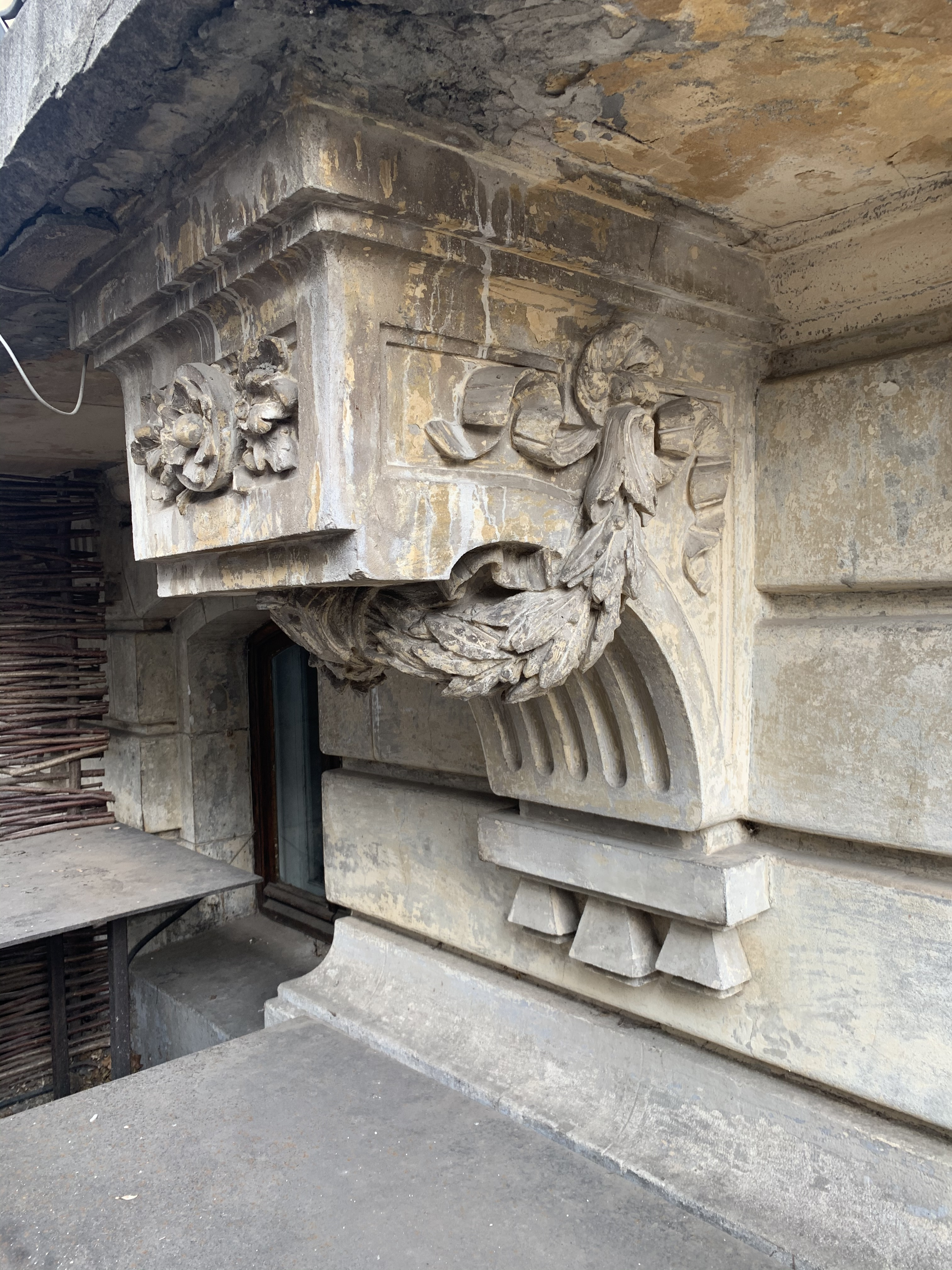
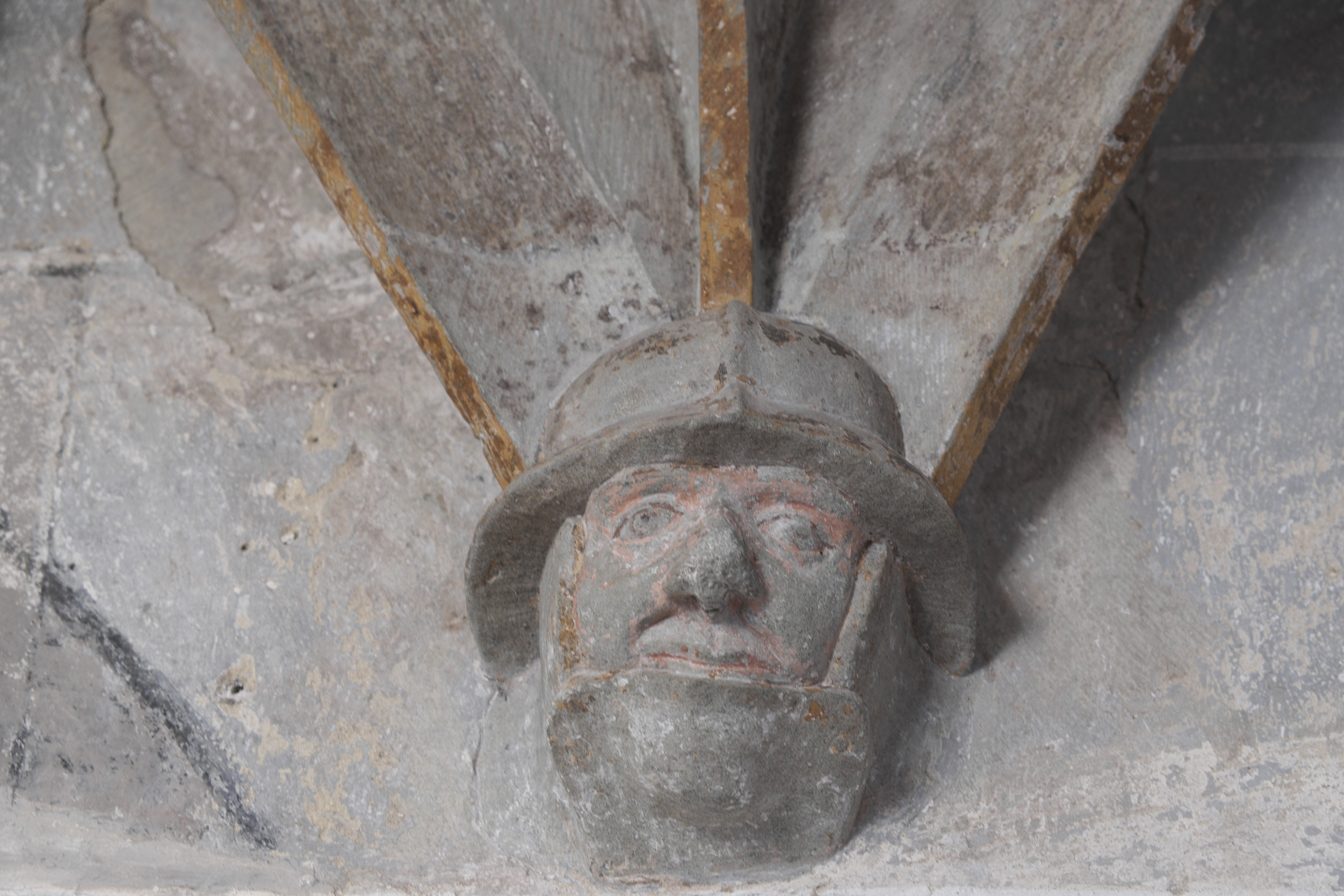
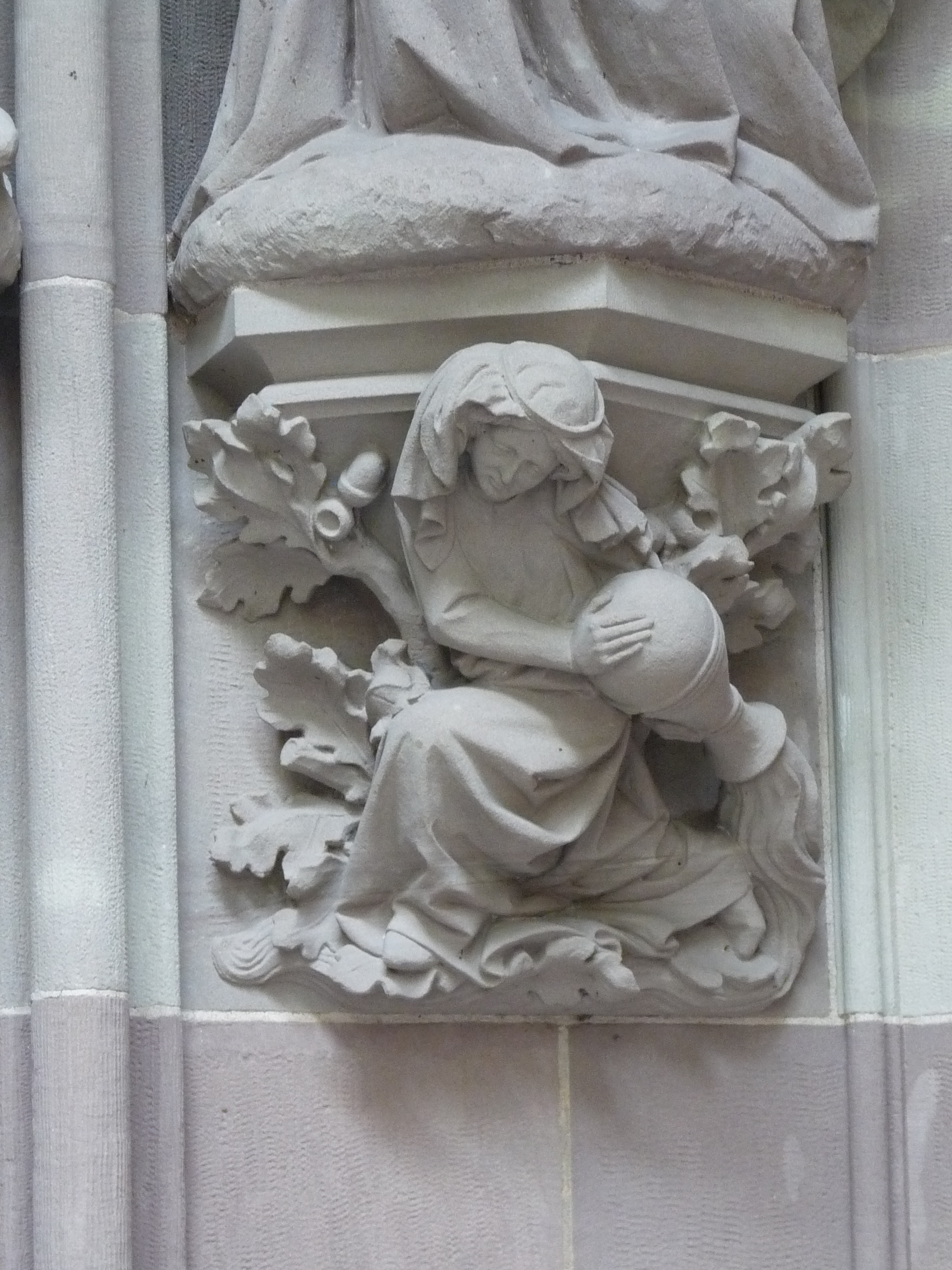
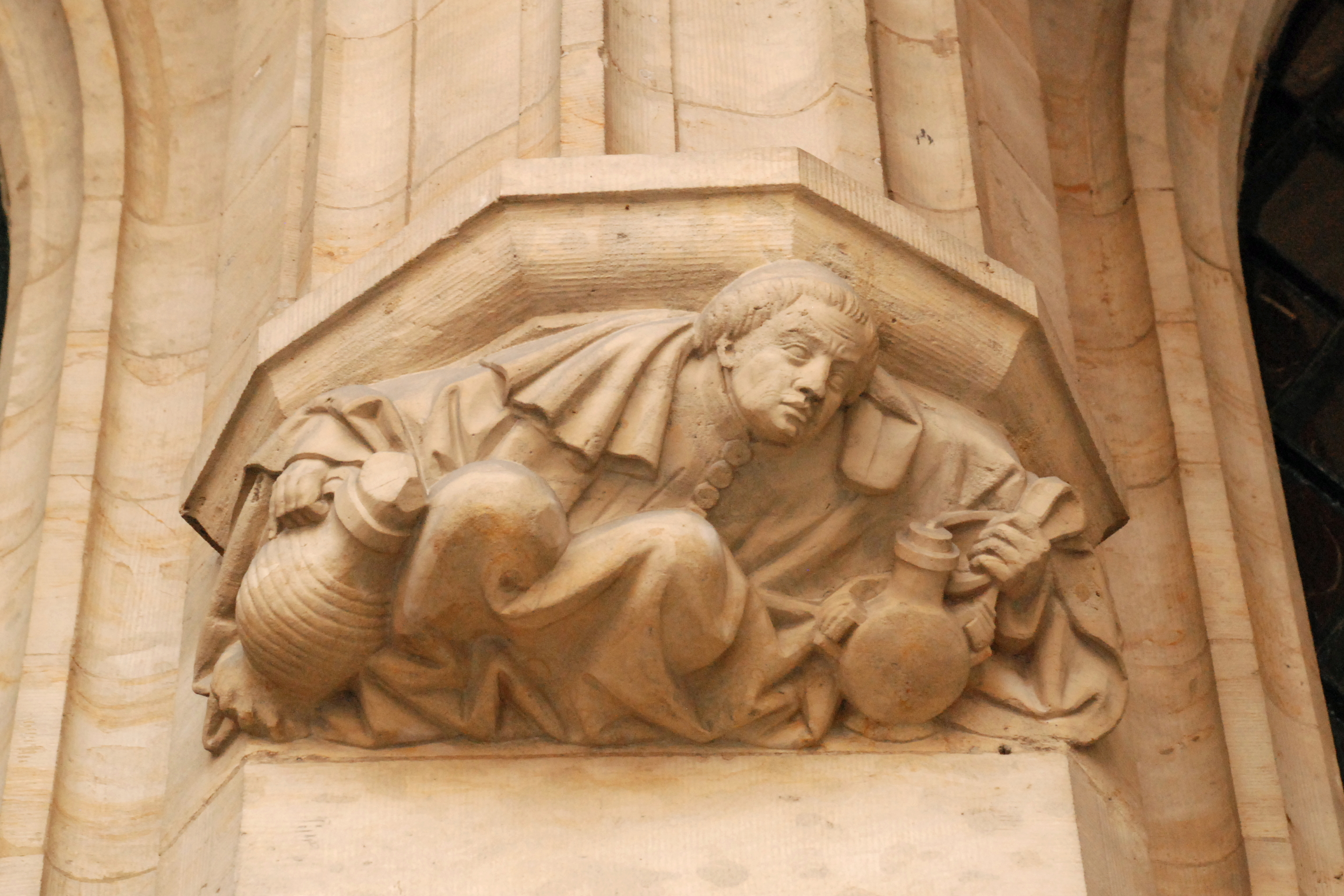
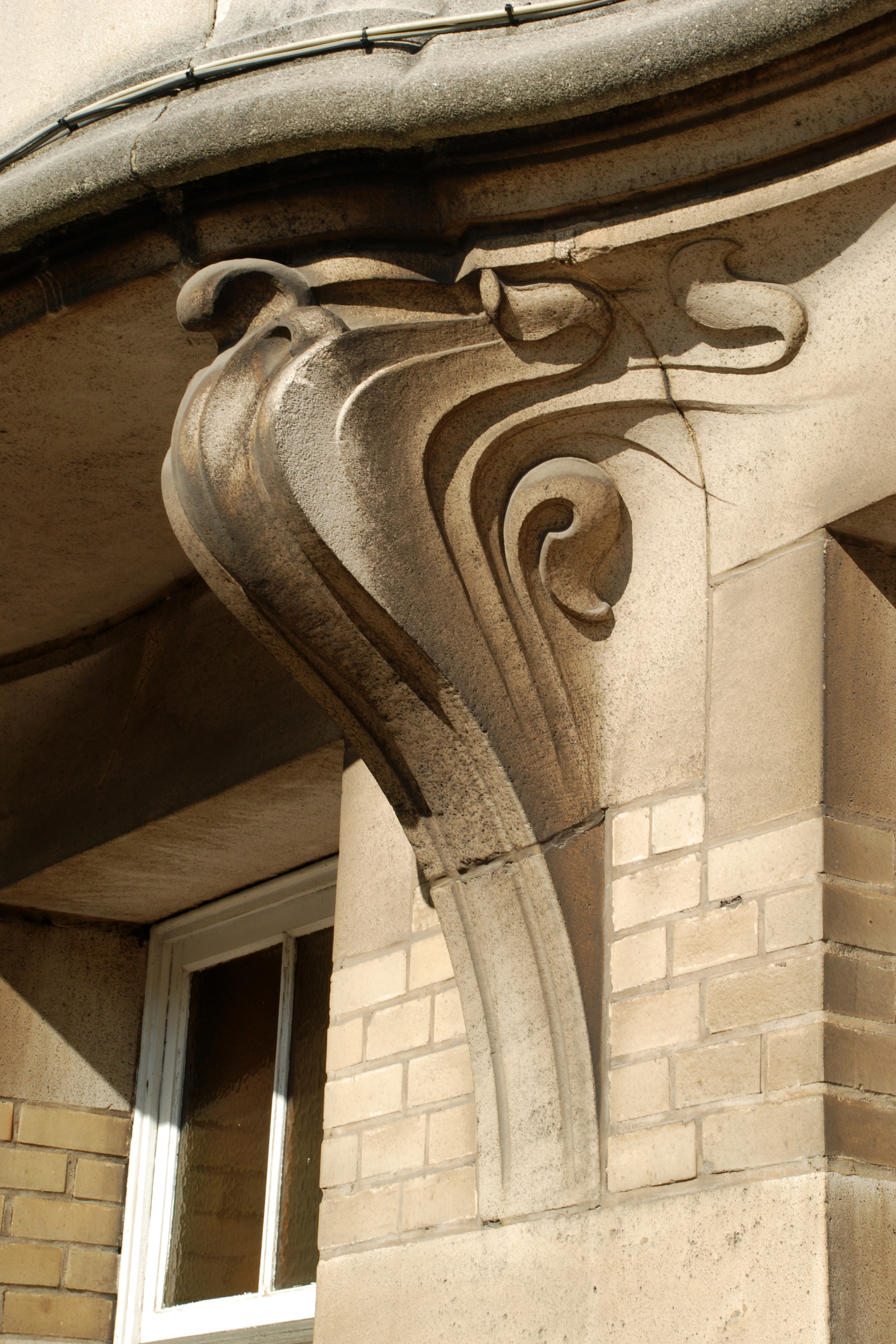
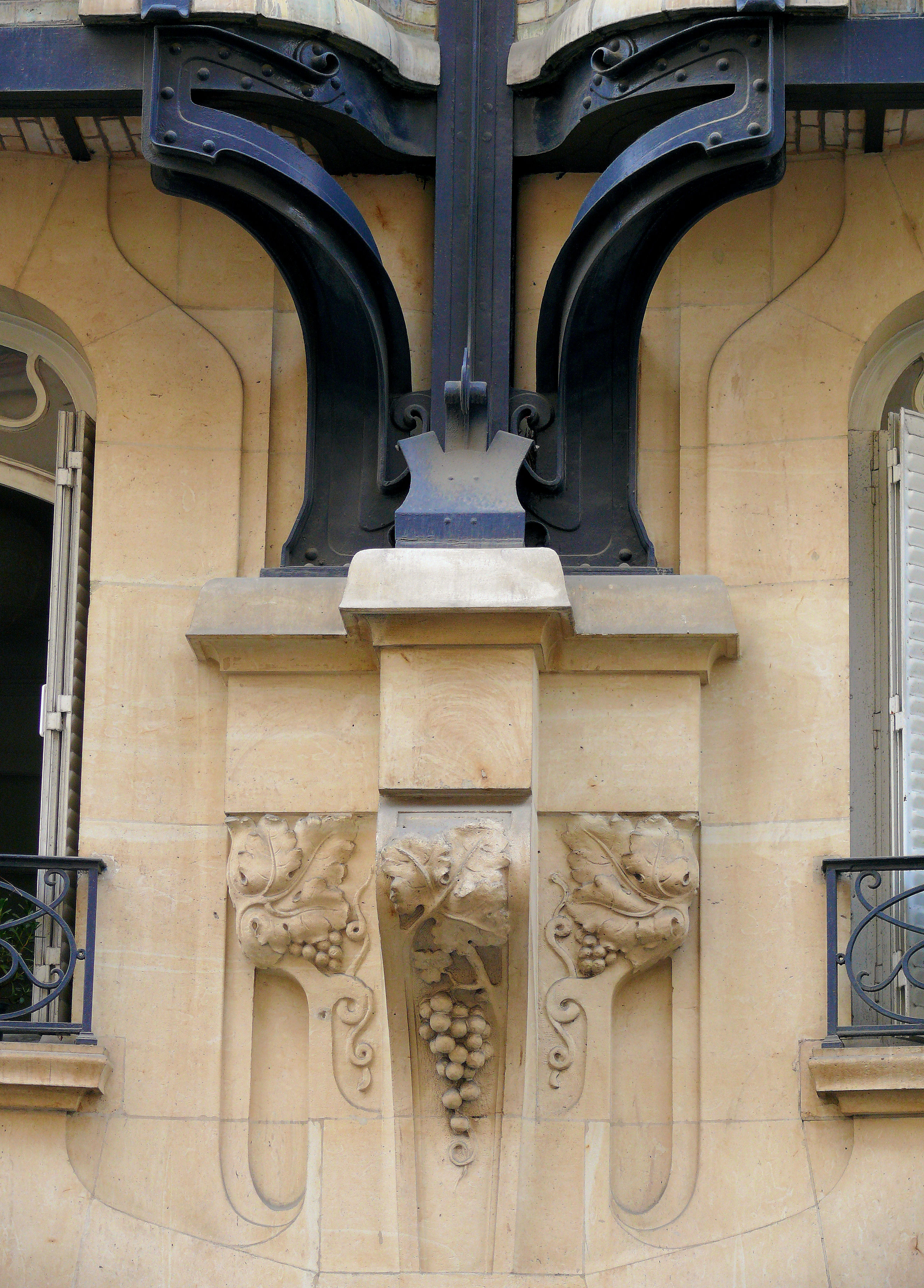
Various examples of corbels in different styles. The ones from the first row are Neoclassical, those from the next are Gothic and those from the final row are Art Nouveau.

In architecture, a corbel is a structural piece of stone, wood, or metal keyed into and projecting from a wall to carry a bearing weight, a type of bracket. A corbel is a solid piece of material in the wall, whereas a console is a piece applied to the structure. A piece of timber projecting in the same manner was called a "tassel" or a "bragger" in England.

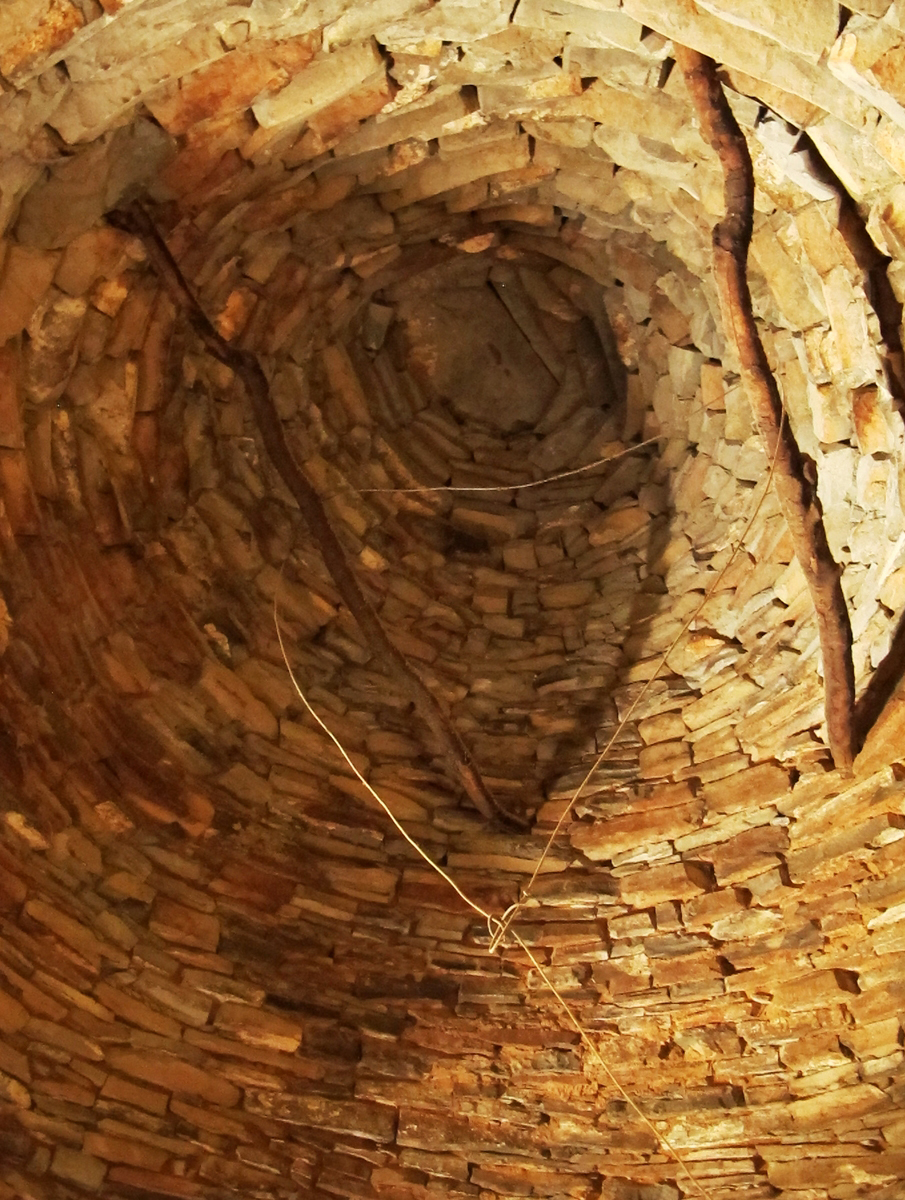
An interior look at the roof of a corbelled house in South Africa

The technique of corbelling, where rows of corbels deeply keyed inside a wall support a projecting wall or parapet, has been used since Neolithic (New Stone Age) times. It is common in medieval architecture and in the Scottish baronial style as well as in the vocabulary of classical architecture, such as the modillions of a Corinthian cornice. The corbel arch and corbel vault use the technique systematically to make openings in walls and to form ceilings. These are found in the early architecture of most cultures, from Eurasia to Pre-Columbian architecture. (Note: See for example: Maes Howe, a particularly fine Neolithic chambered cairn in Scotland)

A console is more specifically an S-shaped scroll bracket in the classical tradition, with the upper or inner part larger than the lower (as in the first illustration) or outer. Keystones are also often in the form of consoles. Whereas "corbel" is rarely used outside architecture, "console" is widely used for furniture, as in console table, and other decorative arts where the motif appears.

The word corbel comes from Old French and derives from the Latin corbellus, a diminutive of corvus ("raven"), which refers to the beak-like appearance. (Note: Oxford English Dictionary gives a similar etymology, but from Latin corvellum or corvellus.) Similarly, the French refer to a bracket-corbel, usually a load-bearing internal feature, as a corbeau ("crow").

== Decorated corbels ==
Norman (Romanesque) corbels often have a plain appearance, although they may be elaborately carved with stylised heads of humans, animals, or imaginary "beasts", and sometimes with other motifs (The Church of St Mary and St David in Kilpeck, Herefordshire is a notable example, with 85 of its original 91 richly carved corbels still surviving).

Similarly, in the Early English period corbels sometimes were elaborately carved, as at Lincoln Cathedral, and sometimes more simply so.

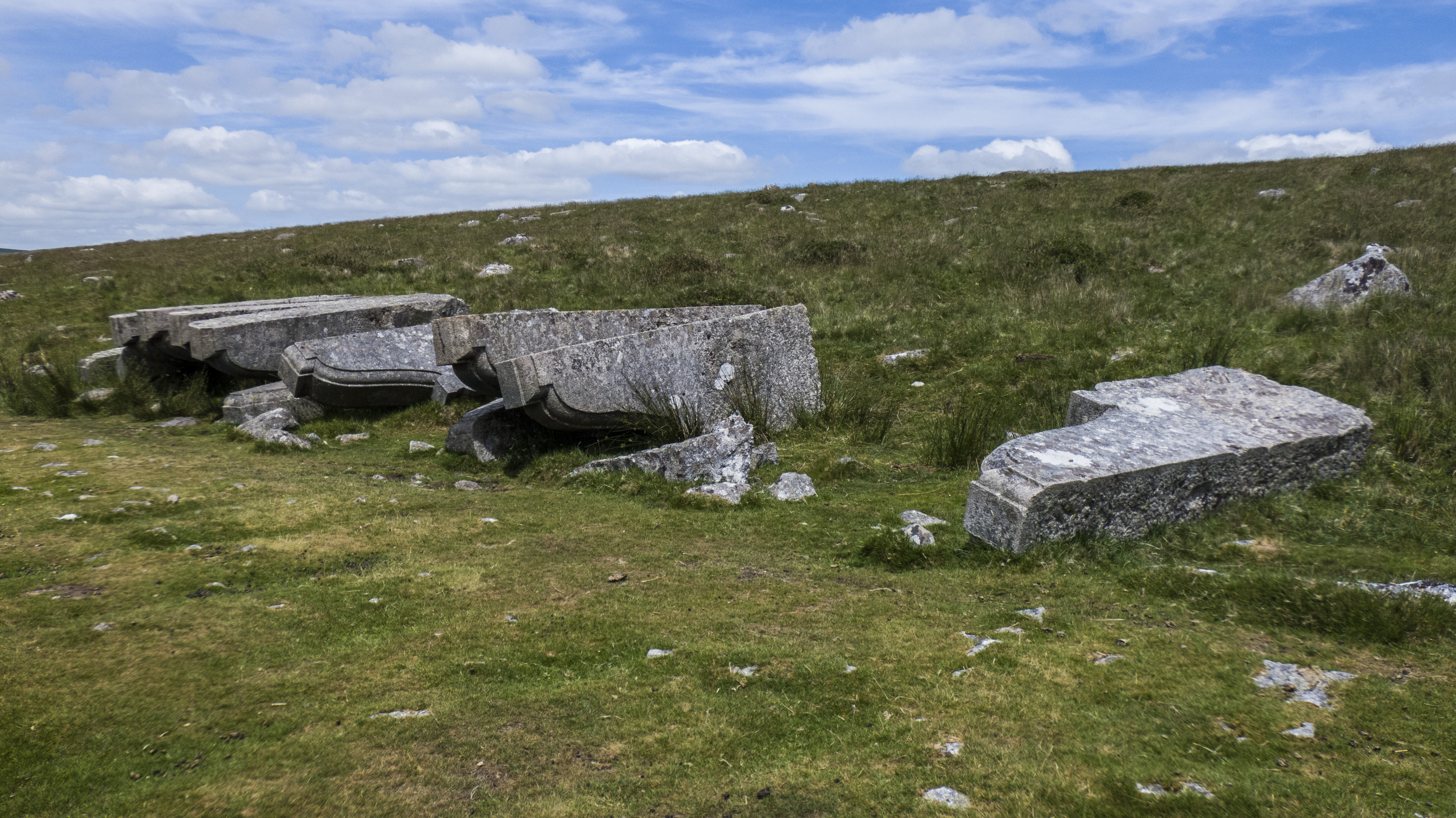
Corbels quarried for New London Bridge (1831-1967), but unused - Swell Tor quarry, Dartmoor, England

Corbels sometimes end with a point apparently growing into the wall, or forming a knot, and often are supported by angels and other figures. In the later periods the carved foliage and other ornaments used on corbels resemble those used in the capitals of columns.

Throughout England, in half-timber work, wooden corbels ("tassels" or "braggers") abound, carrying window-sills or oriel windows in wood, which also are often carved.

== Classical architecture ==
The corbels carrying balconies in Italy and France were sometimes of great size and richly carved, and some of the finest examples of the Italian Cinquecento (sixteenth century) style are found in them. Taking a cue from sixteenth-century practice, the Paris-trained designers of nineteenth-century Beaux-Arts architecture were encouraged to show imagination in varying corbels.

== Corbel tables ==
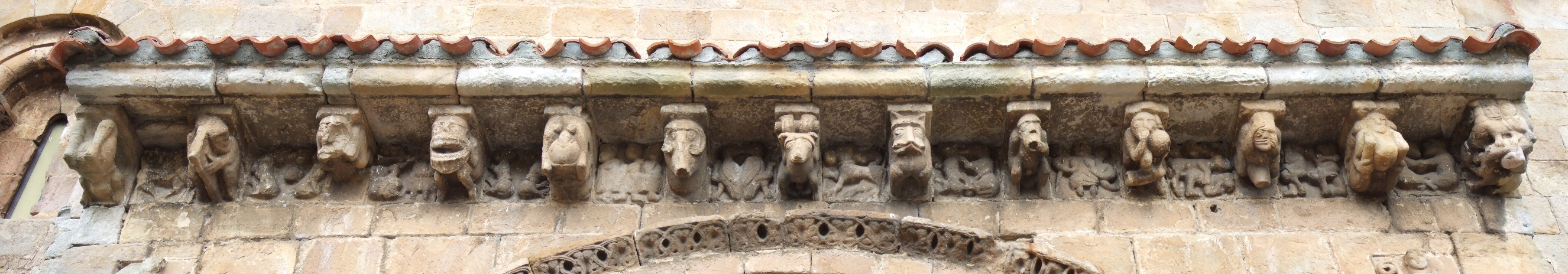
Romanesque corbel table featuring erotic scenes at Colegiata de Cervatos, near Santander, Spain

A corbel table is a projecting, moulded string course supported by a range of corbels. Sometimes these corbels carry a small arcade under the string course, the arches of which are pointed and trefoiled. As a rule, the corbel table carries the gutter, but in Lombard work the arcaded corbel table was used as a decoration to subdivide the storeys and to break up the wall surface. In Italy, sometimes a moulding will be formed over the corbels and sometimes corbels above a plain piece of projecting wall form a parapet.

The corbels carrying the arches of the corbel tables in Italy and France often were elaborately moulded, sometimes in two or three courses projecting over one another; those carrying the machicolations of English and French castles had four courses.

In modern chimney construction, a corbel table is constructed on the inside of a flue in the form of a concrete ring beam supported by a range of corbels. The corbels may be either in-situ or pre-cast concrete. The corbel tables described here are built at approximately ten-metre intervals to ensure stability of the barrel of refractory bricks constructed thereon.

== Corbelling ==
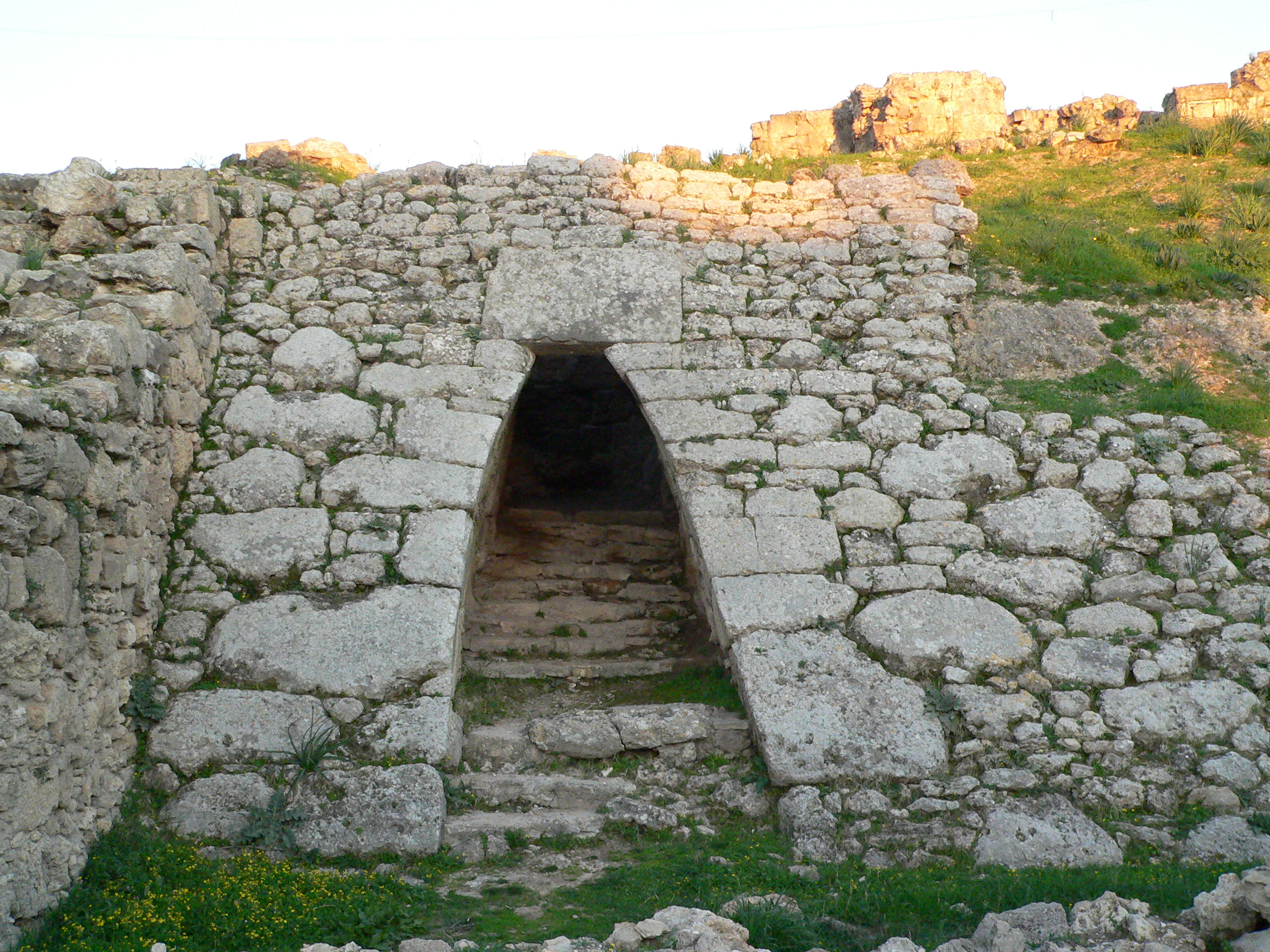
Corbelled arch at the Royal Palace of Ugarit, second millennium BC

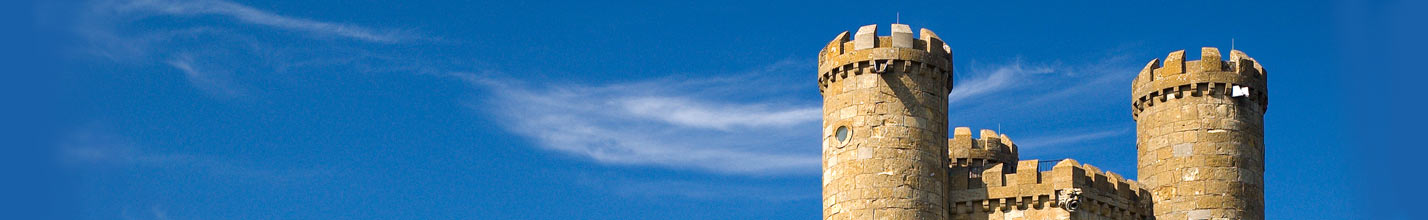
Corbelling to resemble machicolations on an eighteenth-century folly, Broadway Tower, England

Corbelling, where rows of corbels gradually build a wall out from the vertical, has long been used as a simple kind of vaulting, for example in many Neolithic chambered cairns, where walls are gradually corbelled in until the opening can be spanned by a slab.

Corbelled vaults are very common in early architecture around the world. Different types may be called the beehive house (ancient Britain and elsewhere), the Irish clochán, the pre-Roman nuraghe of Sardinia, and the tholos tombs (or "beehive tombs") of Late Bronze Age Greece and other parts of the Mediterranean.

In medieval architecture, the technique was used to support upper storeys or a parapet projecting forward from the wall plane, often to form machicolations (openings between corbels could be used to drop things onto attackers). This later use became a decorative feature, without the openings. Corbelling supporting upper stories and particularly supporting projecting corner turrets subsequently became a characteristic of the Scottish baronial style.

Medieval timber-framed buildings often employ jettying, where upper stories are cantilevered out on projecting wooden beams in a similar manner to corbelling.

== Gallery ==
Short chronological visual history of corbels

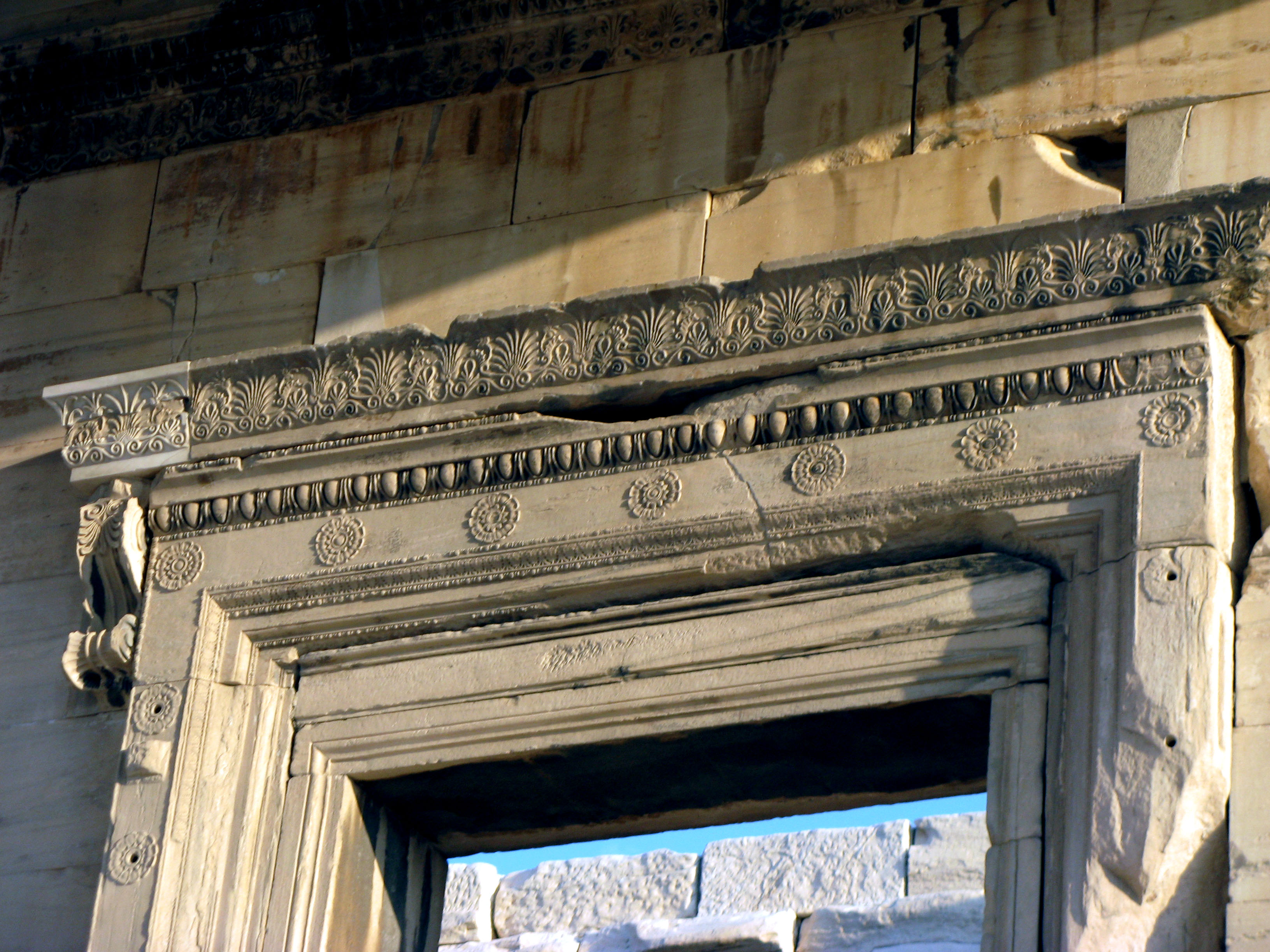
Ancient Greek corbel (initially a pair) of a door of the Erechtheum (Athens, Greece)

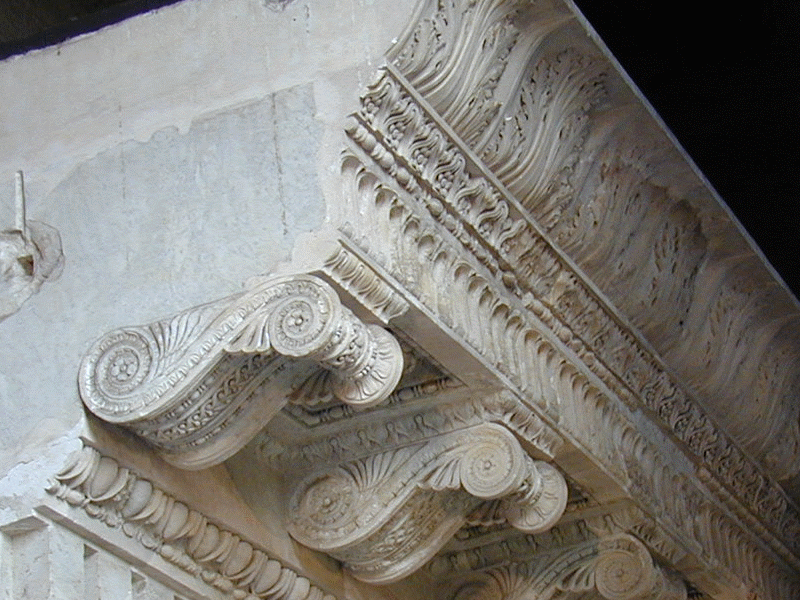
Roman corbels of a modillion cornice from the Temple of Concord (Rome), in the Tabularium (Rome)

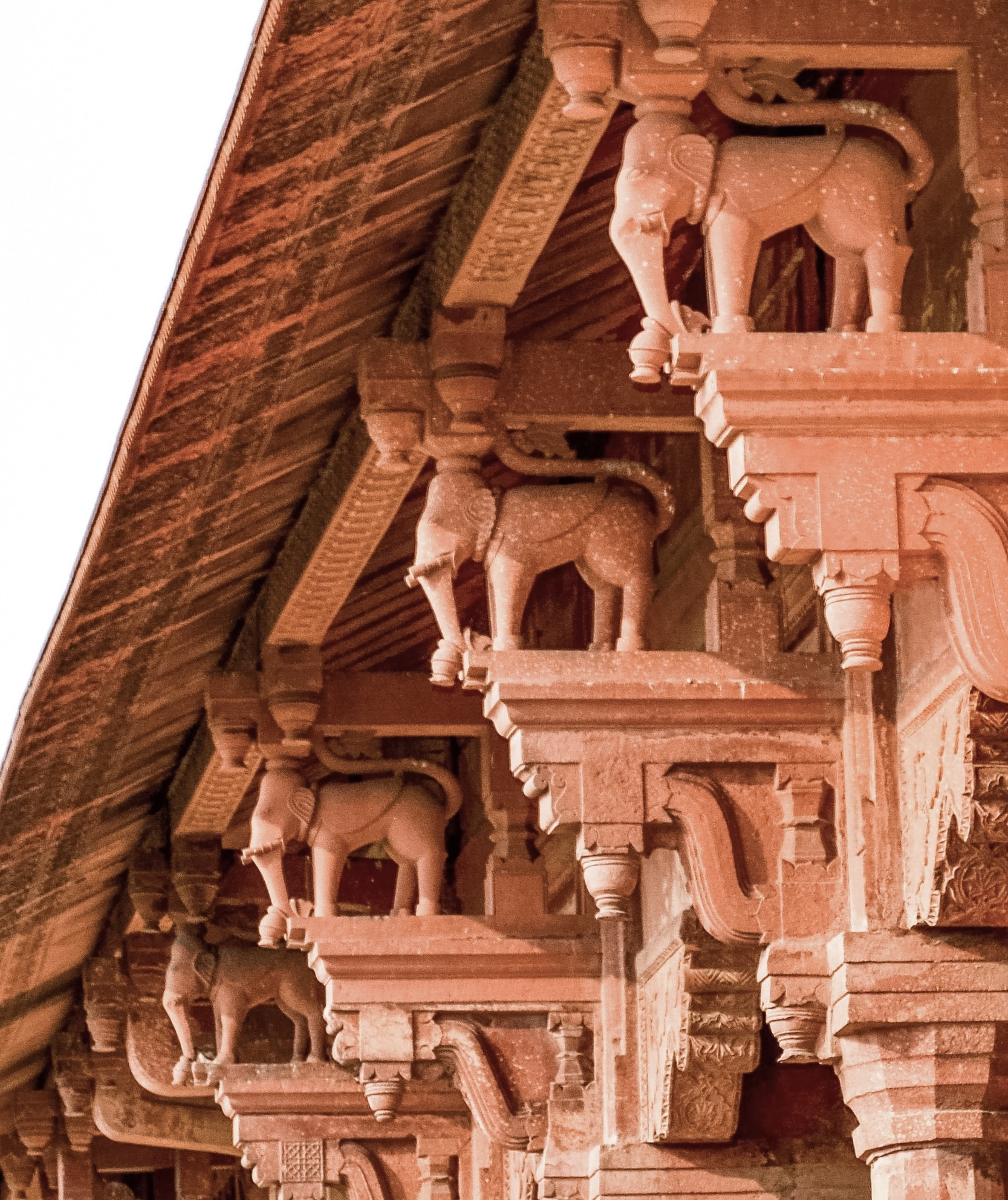
Indian corbels of the Lahore Fort (Lahore, Pakistan)

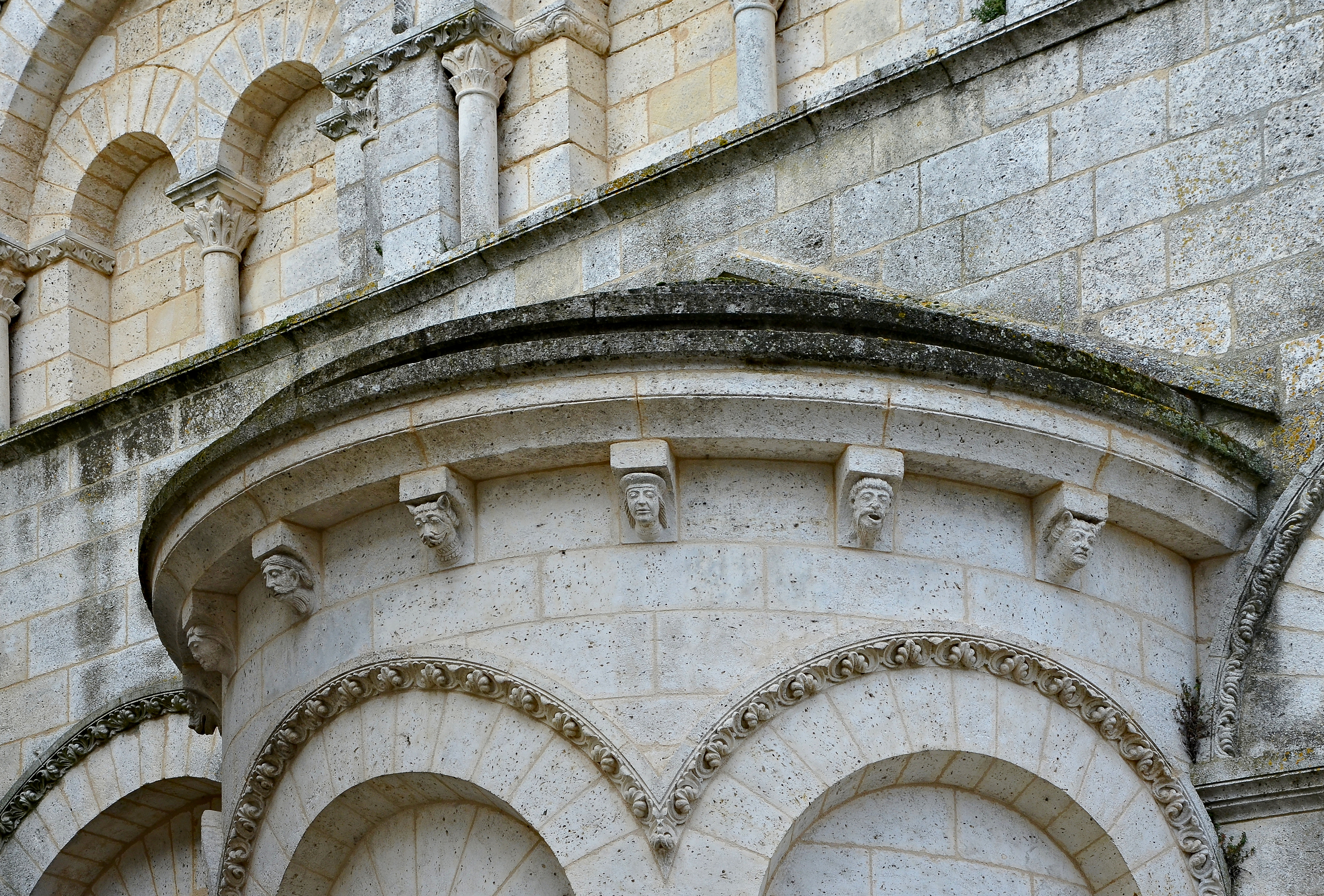
Romanesque corbels of the Angoulême Cathedral (Angoulême, France)

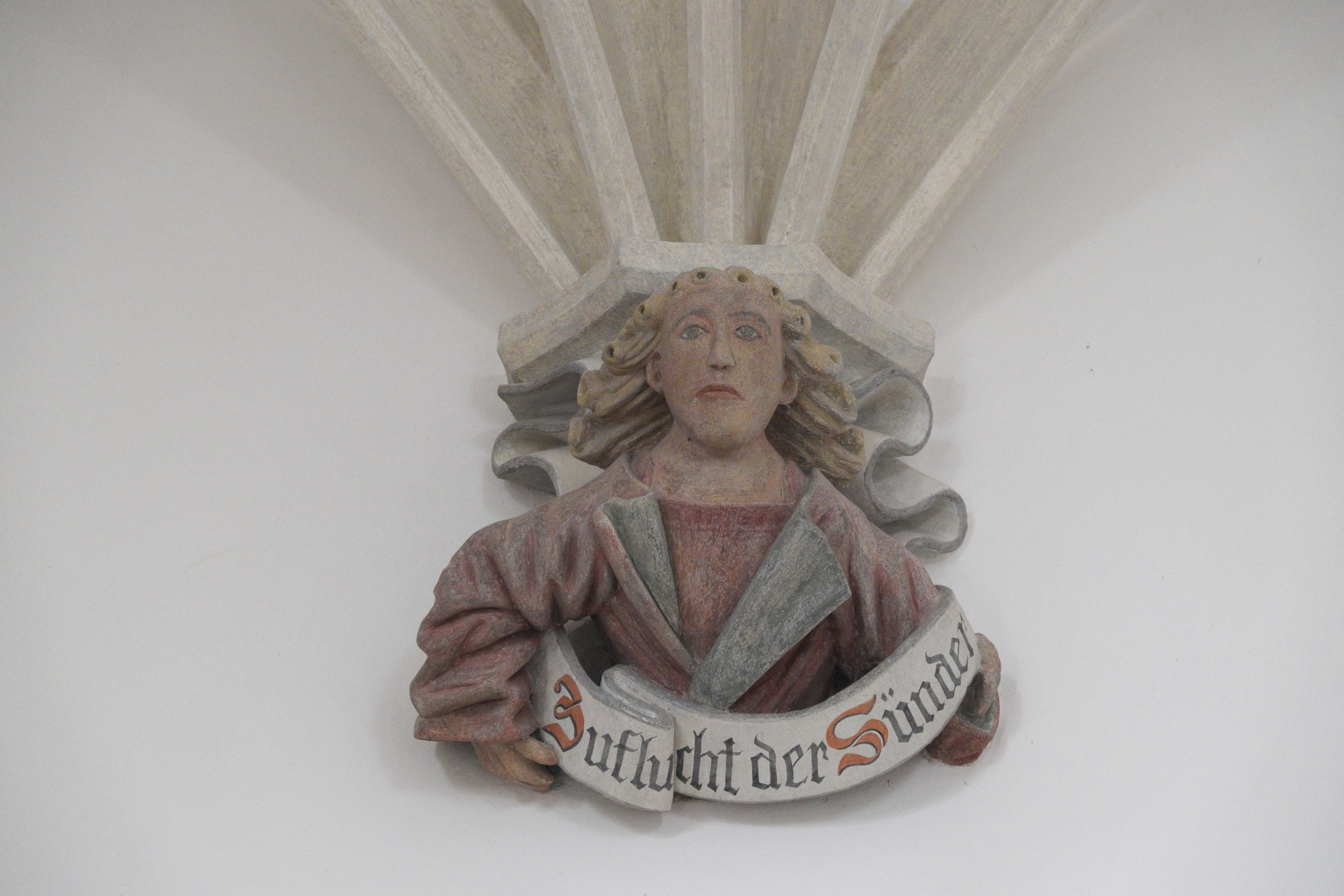
Gothic corbel in the Mariä Himmelfahrt (Bad Tölz, Germany)

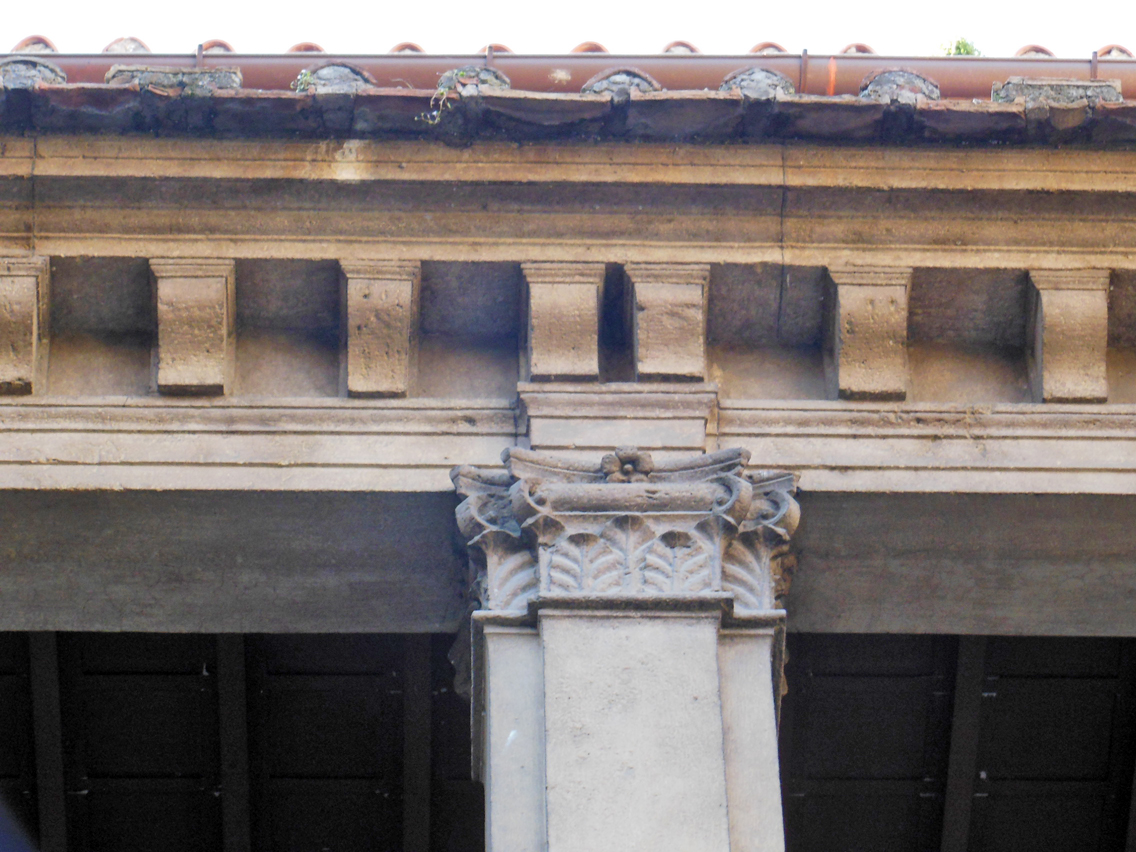
Renaissance corbels of the Santa Maria della Pace (Rome)

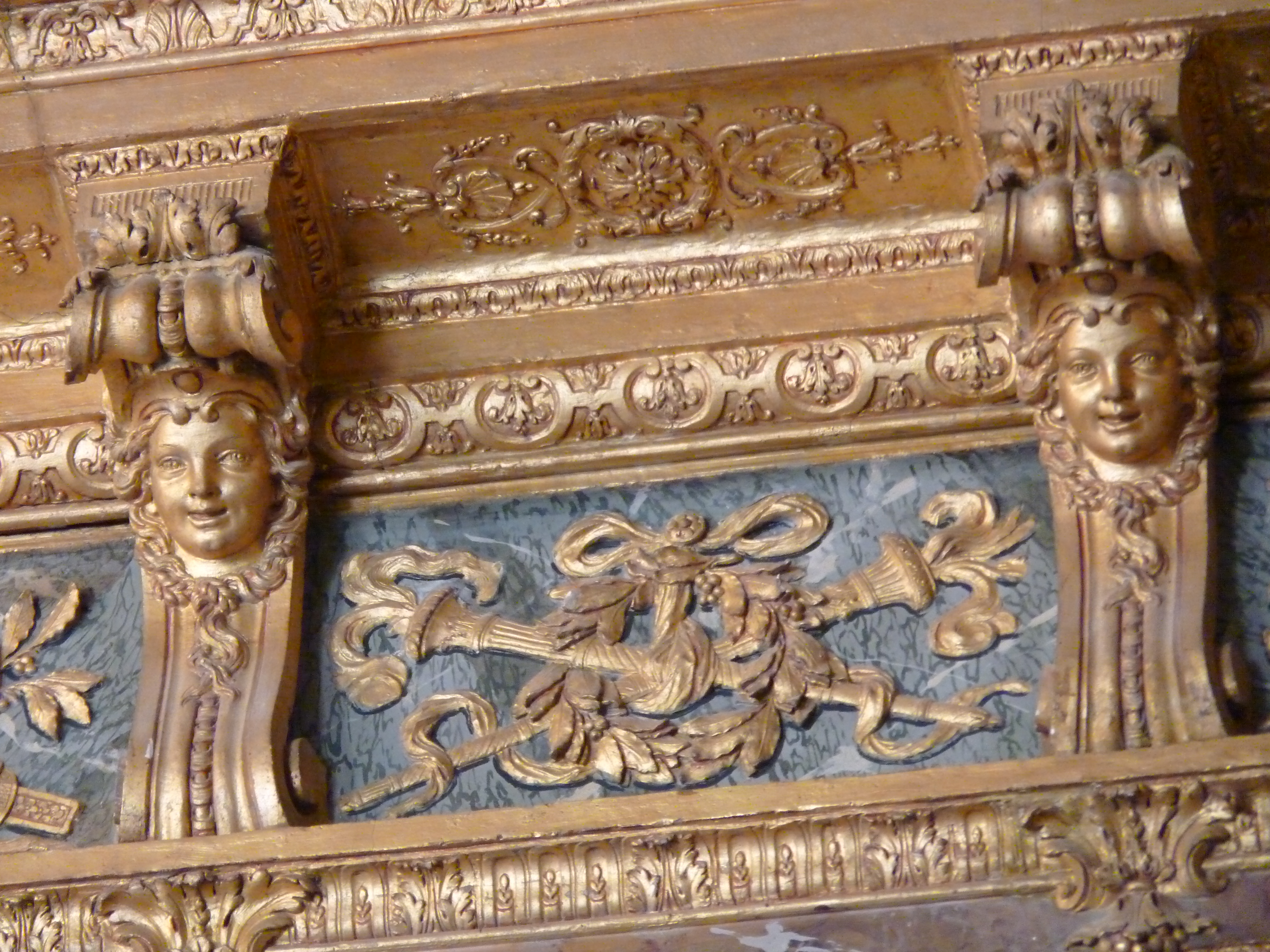
Baroque corbels with mascarons in the Salon d'Hercule (Palace of Versailles, France)

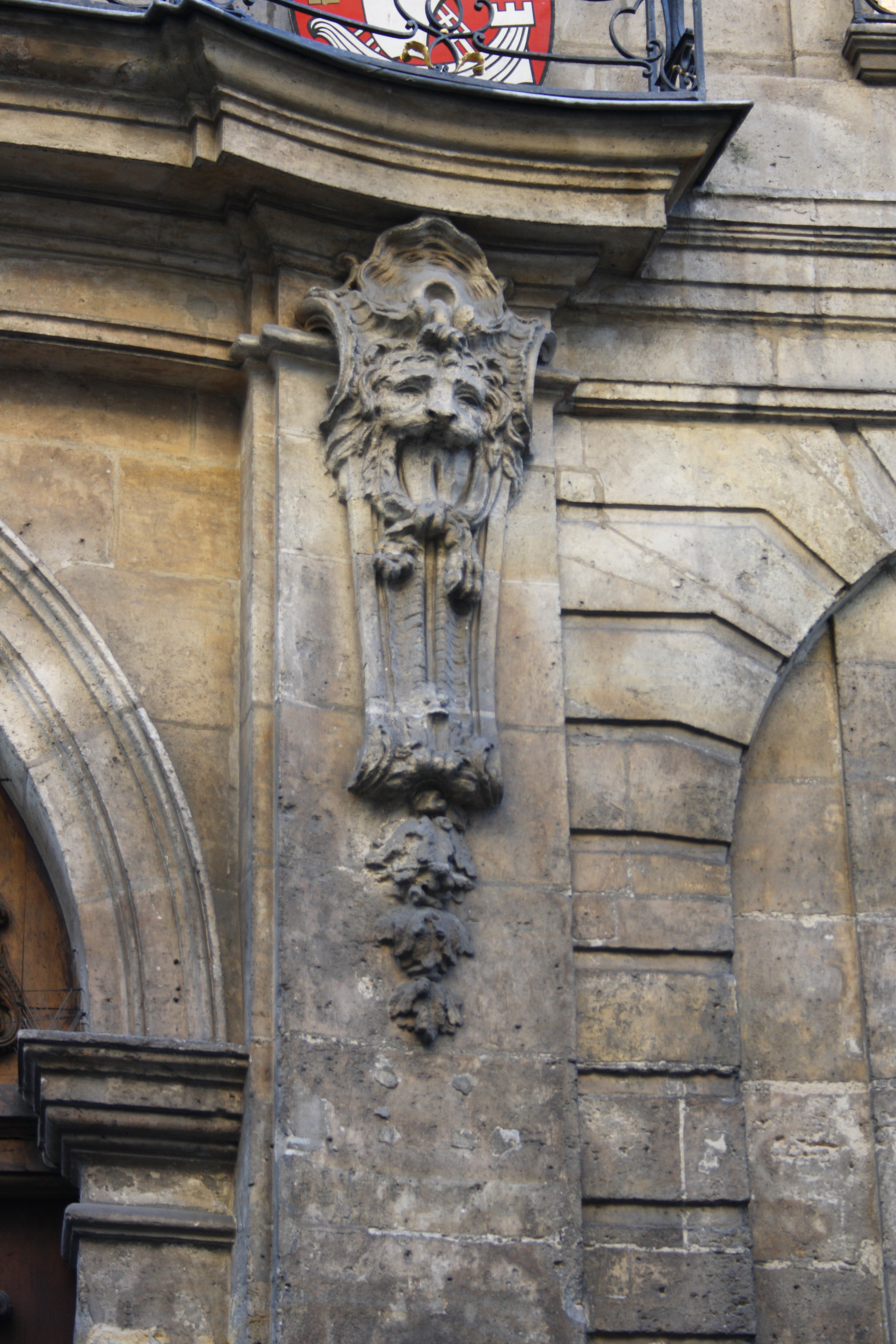
Rococo corbel with a mascaron, on the Hôtel Jeanne d'Albret (Paris)

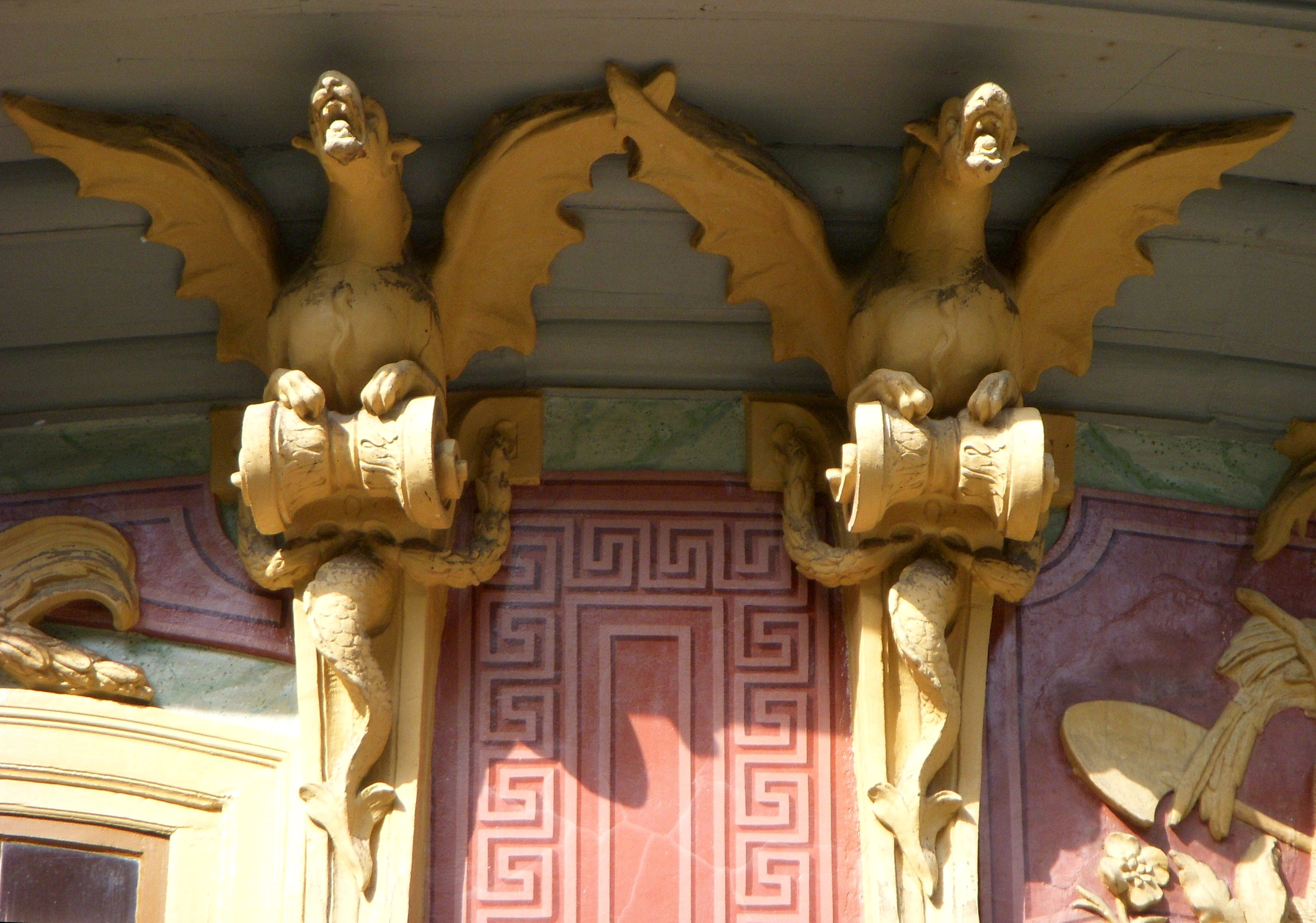
Chinoiserie of the Chinese Pavilion at Drottningholm (Ekerö Municipality, Sweden)

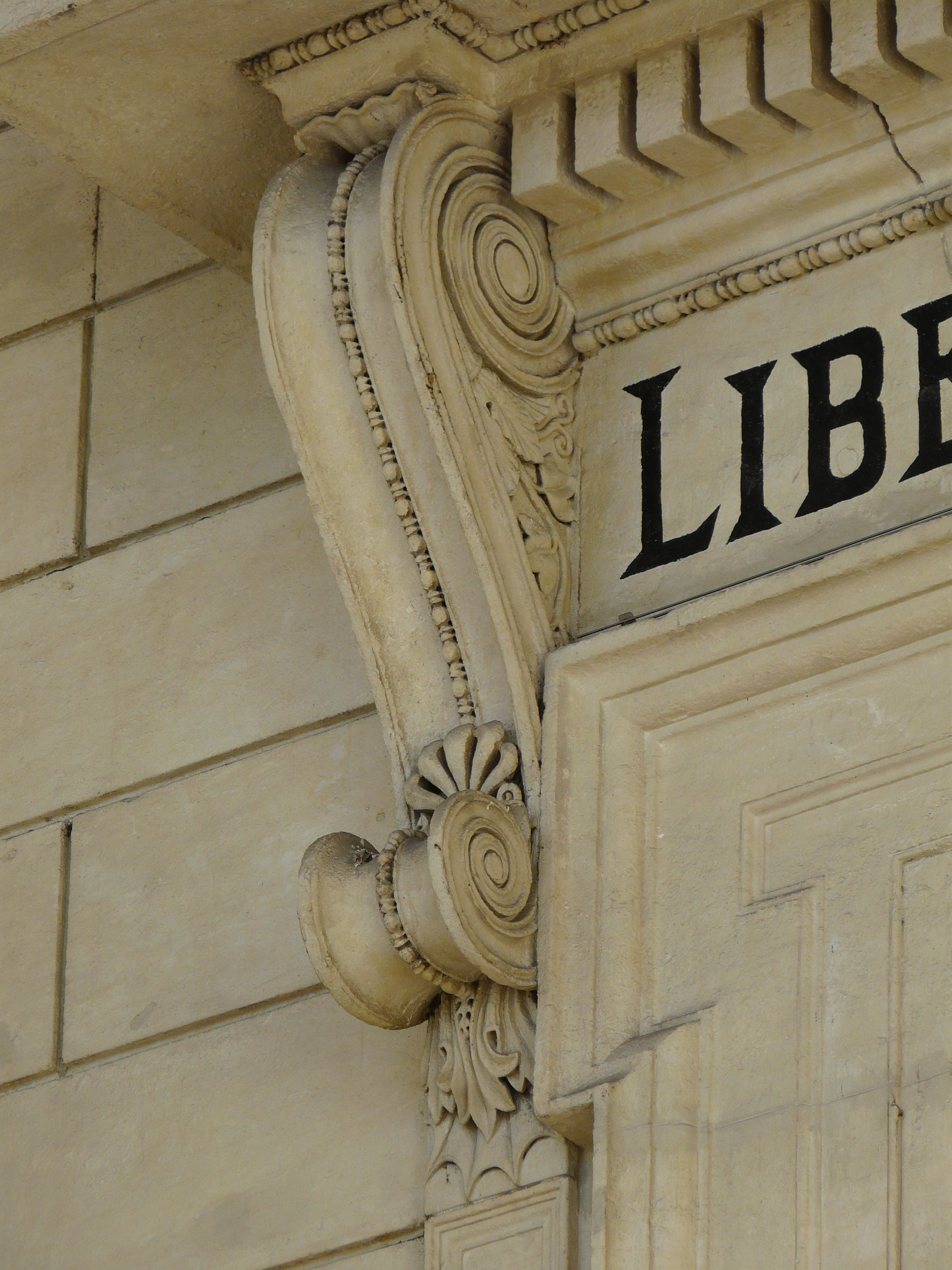
Neoclassical corbel of the Palais de Justice de Périgueux (Périgueux, France)

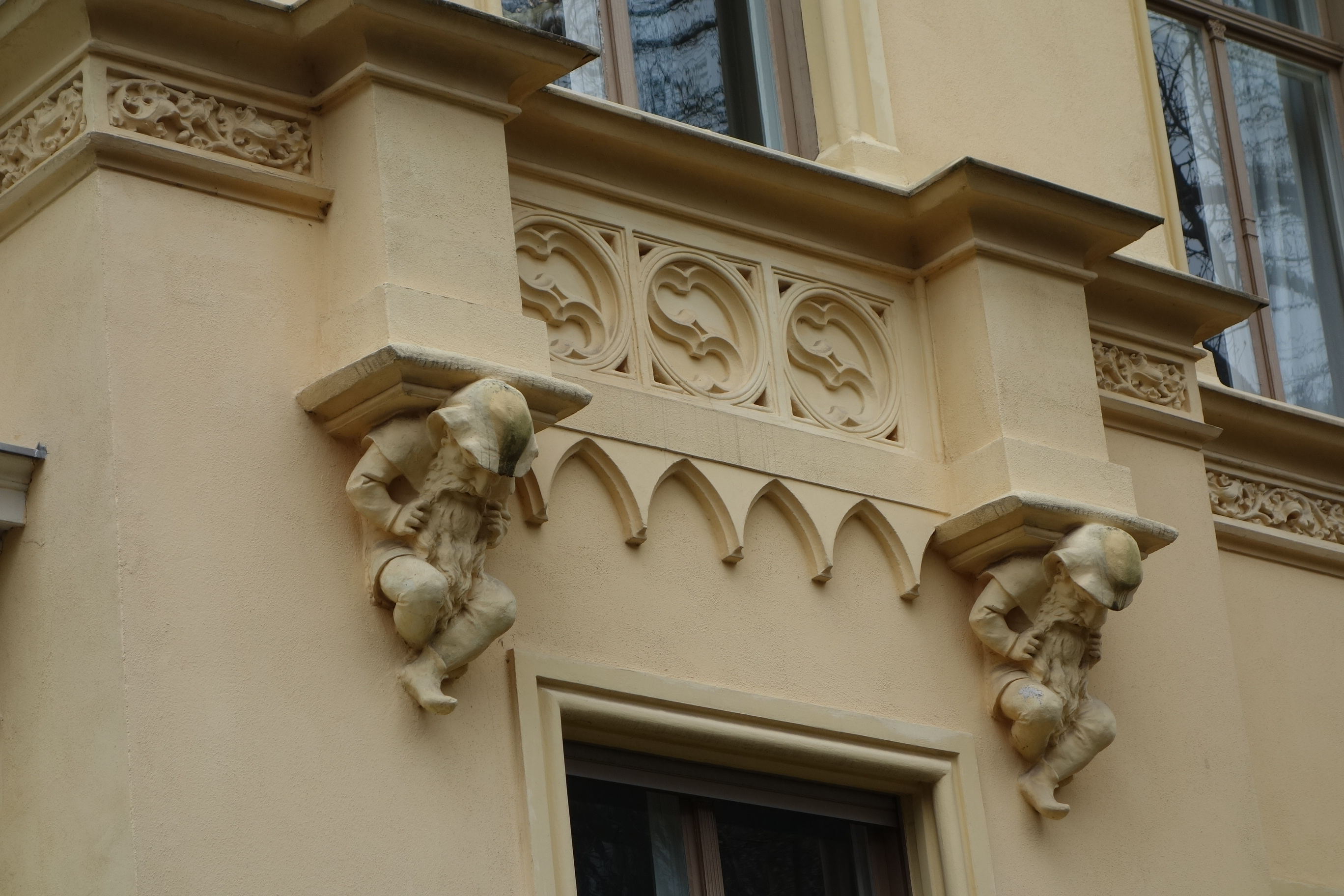
Gothic Revival corbel supported balcony in Potsdam (Germany)

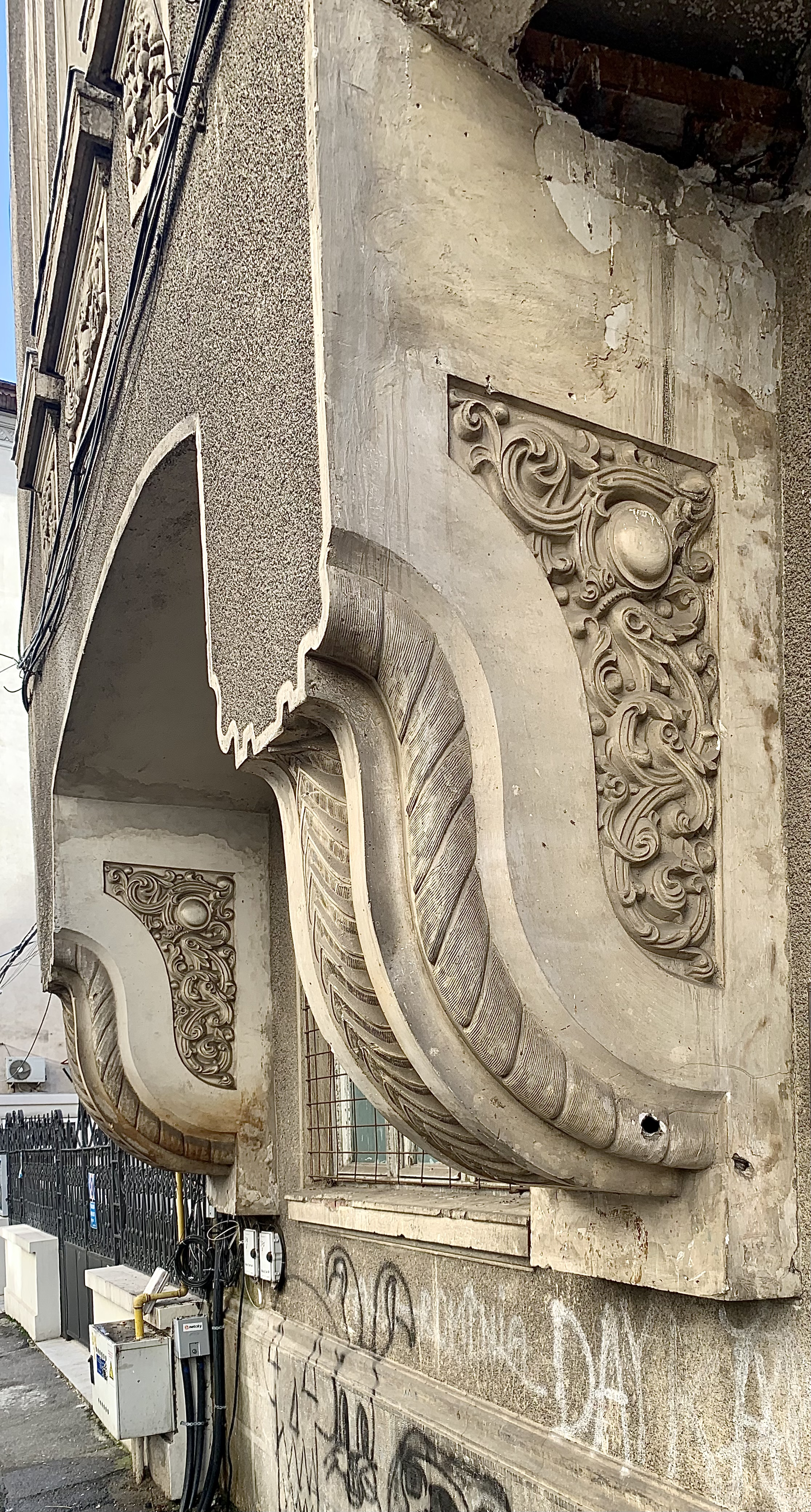
Romanian Revival corbels of house no. 5 on Strada Mămulari in Bucharest (Romania)

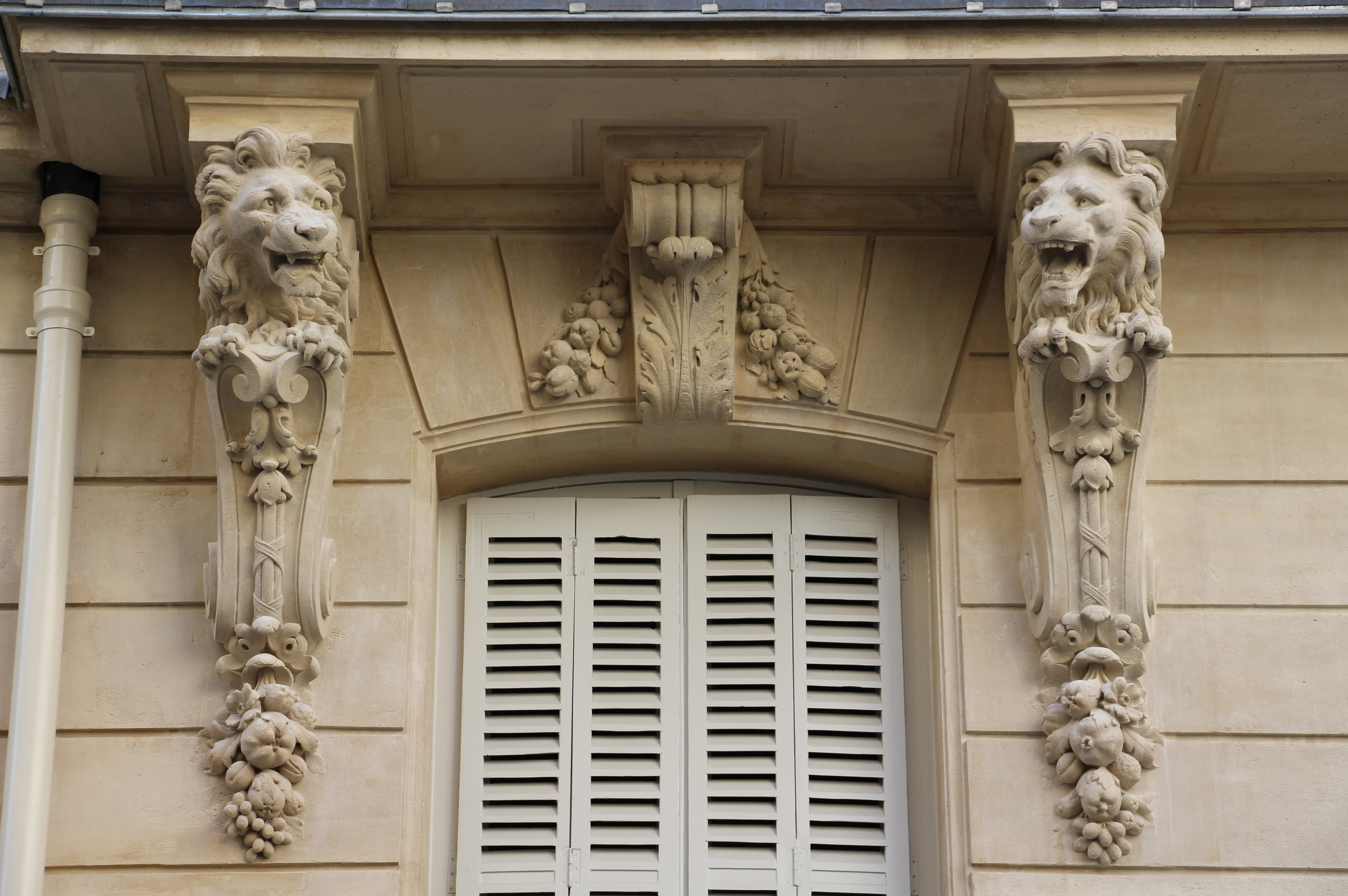
19th century Eclectic Classicist corbels on Rue des Saints-Pères (Paris)

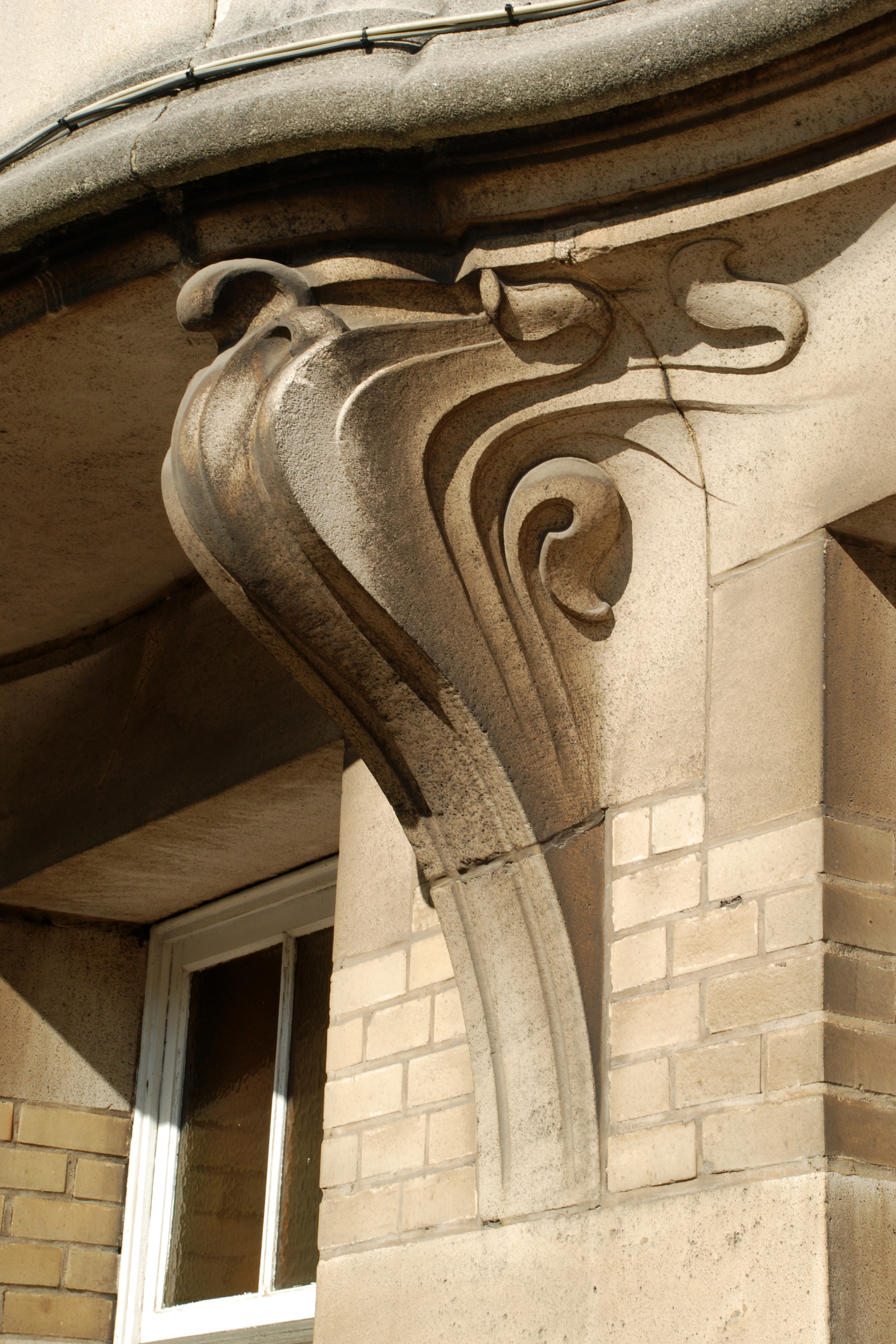
Art Nouveau corbel in Brussels (Belgium)

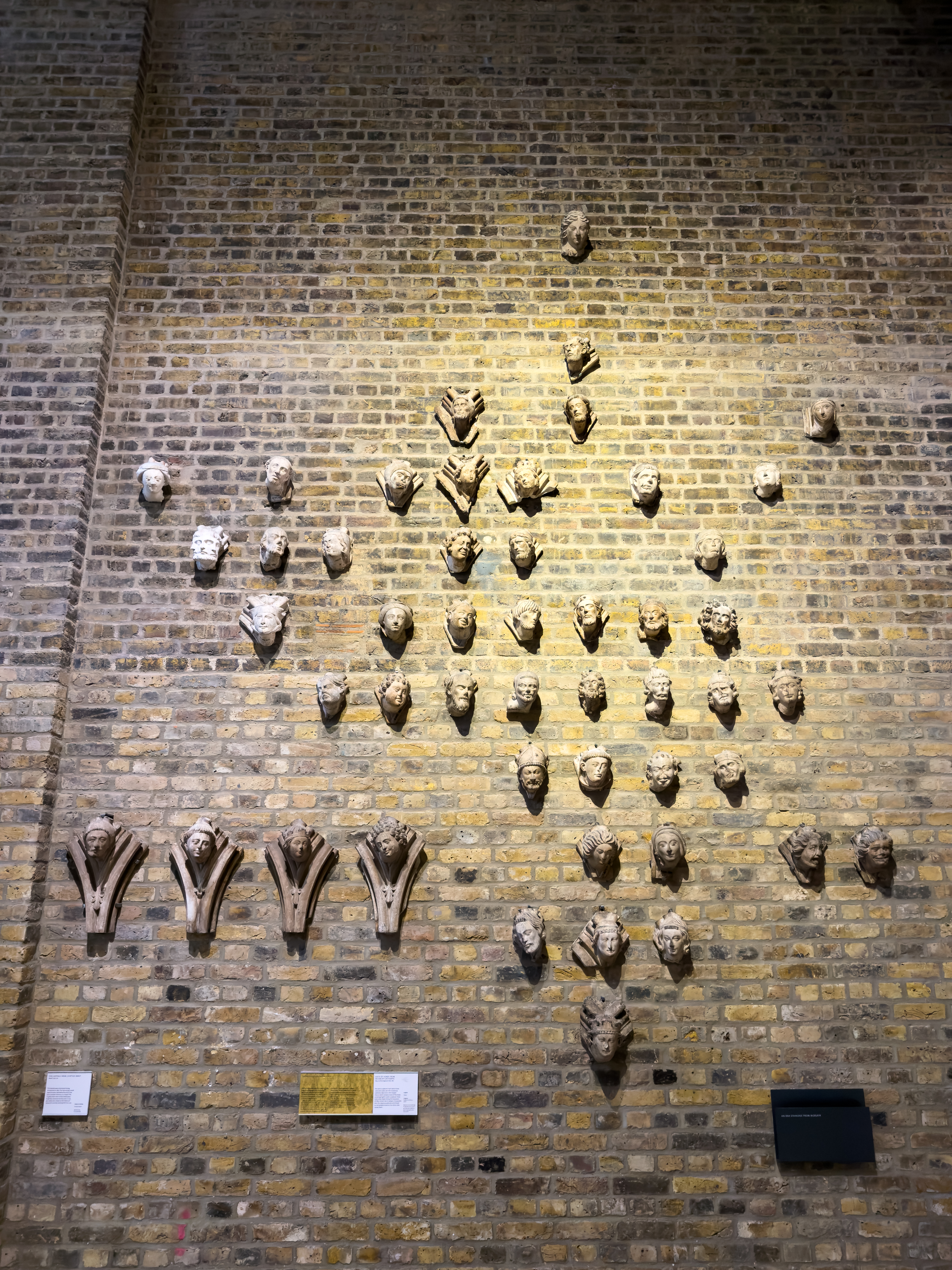
19th century plaster casts of ornamental heads from Salisbury Cathedral (originals c. 1260–1280), Daylit Gallery, V&A Museum, London

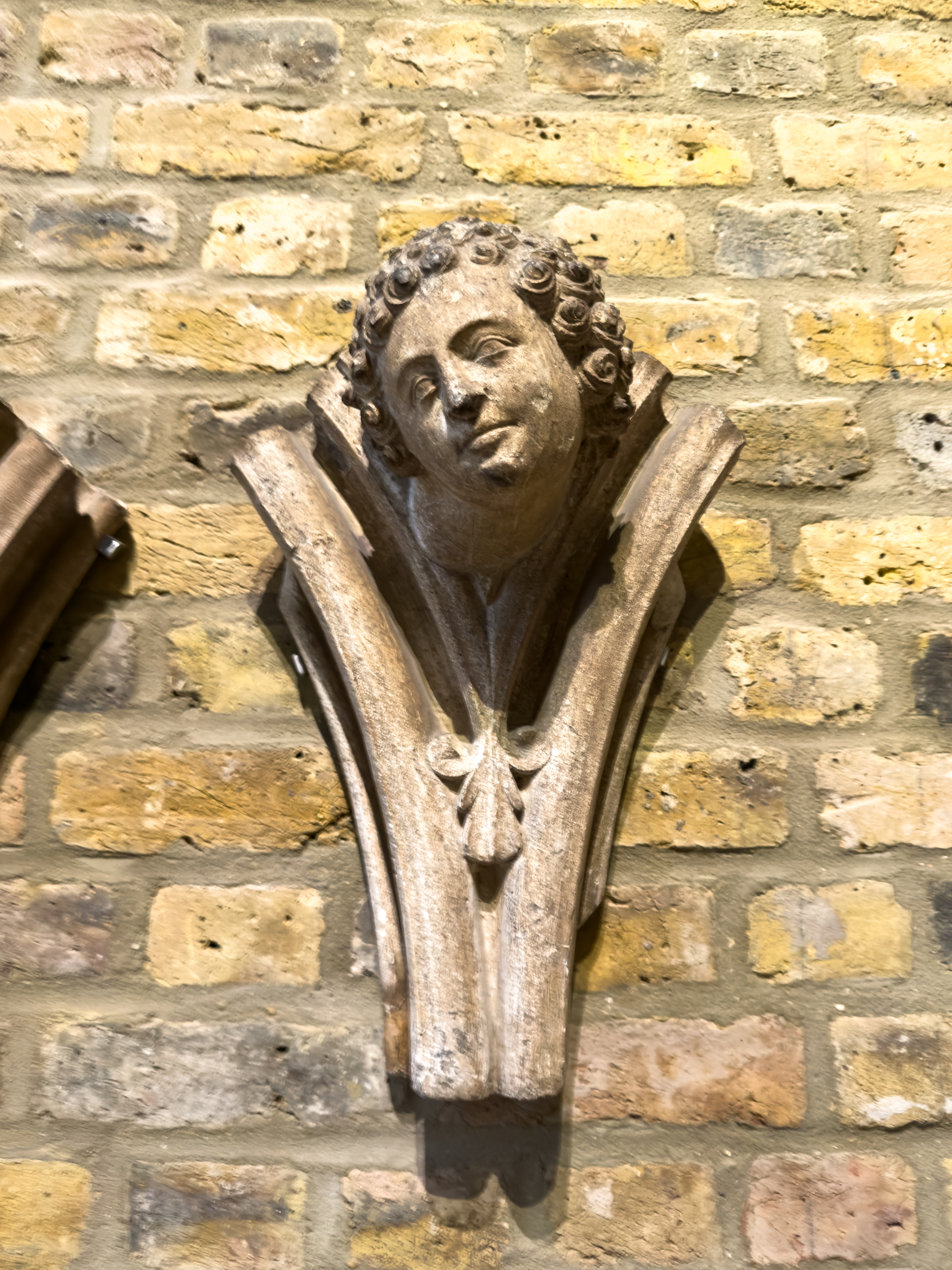
Cast from Salisbury Cathedral, V&A Museum, London (detail)

Annotated sketch of an Italian battlement

== See also ==
- Atlas (architecture)
- Dentil
- Eaves
- Fireplace mantel
- Modillion
- Muqarnas
