= Malcolm Thurlby =

British-Canadian art and architecture professor

Malcolm Thurlby, teaches art and architectural history at York University, Toronto. His research interests focus on Romanesque and Gothic architecture and sculpture in Europe and 19th and early 20th century architecture in Canada.

== Early life ==
Thurlby was born in London in 1948; the birth registered at the Paddington District Office.

Thurlby attended Watford Grammar School for Boys from 1960 to 1968. From there he went to the University of East Anglia, graduating in 1971 with a B.A. For postgraduate research at East Anglia, he was awarded a PhD in 1976. His thesis, Transitional Sculpture in England (1150—1240), was supervised by Eric Fernie.

== Academic life ==
In 1983 Thurlby moved to Canada to lecture at York University, Toronto where he continues to work specialising in Romanesque and Gothic architecture and sculpture. He is now Professor of Medieval Art and Architecture, Canadian Architecture in the Graduate Programme in Art History, in the Department of Visual Art and Art History.

Thurlby was made a Fellow of the Society of Antiquaries, London in 1987. He is a Fellow of the Royal Historical Society.

=== Selected publications ===
==== Books as author ====
- Romanesque Architecture and Sculpture in Wales, Almeley, Logaston Press, 2006. ISBN 978-1904396505
- The Herefordshire School of Romanesque Sculpture, Almeley, Logaston Press, 2013. ISBN 978-1906663728
- The Architecture and Sculpture of Deerhurst Priory: The Later 11th, 12th and Early 13th Centuries, Deerhurst Walton, Friends of Deerhurst, 2014. ISBN 978-0954948467

==== Journals ====
- Anglo-Saxon Reminiscences and other aspects of the Romanesque Fabric of Worcester Cathedral, Transactions of the Worcestershire Archaeological Society, 26 (2018), pp 113-148
- The Abbey Church of Lessay (Manche) and Romanesque Architecture in North East England, The Antiquaries Journal. Volume 94 (2014), pp 71-92, Cambridge University Press
- Christ Church, Maugerville, New Brunswick: Bishop John Medley, Frank Wills and the Transmission of Ecclesiological Principles in Anglican Churches in Canada’, Journal of the Society for the Study of Architecture in Canada, 38, no. 1 (2013), pp 21-28

==== Chapters in books ====
- Articulation as an Expression of Function in Romanesque Architecture, in Jill A. Franklin, T.A. Heslop and Christine Anderson (eds), (2012), Architecture and Interpretation: Essays for Eric Fernie, Woodbridge, Boydell and Brewer ISBN 9781782040491
- The Building of a Cathedral: The Romanesque and Early Gothic Fabric, in Douglas Pocock (ed) (2014) Durham Cathedral: A Celebration, Durham, City of Durham Trust ISBN 9780902776029

==== Online blogs ====
- First Rate Gothic: A Look at St. Paul's Presbyterian Church, Hamilton.

== Photography ==
Thurlby used his own photographic slides in lectures and to illustrate his writings. Photographs attributed to him are to be found in the Conway Library at the Courtauld Institute of Art, London. This collection comprises mostly architectural and sculptural images and contains glass and film negatives as well as prints. It is currently in the process of being digitised as part of the wider project 'Courtauld Connects'.
