= Delamere station =

Delamere station may refer to:

- Delamere railway station, a railway station in Cheshire, England
- Delamere Station (pastoral lease), a cattle farm in Northern Territory, Australia

== See also ==
- Delamere (disambiguation)
