= Delamarre =

Delamarre is a surname. Notable people with the surname include:

- Camille Delamarre (born 1979), French film editor and director
- Henriette Delamarre de Monchaux (1854–1911), French naturalist, geologist and paleontologist
- Hervé Delamarre (born 1967), French slalom canoeist
- Louis-Charles-Auguste Delamarre de Lamellerie (1771–1840), French Navy officer and captain
- Raymond Delamarre (1890–1986), French sculptor and medalist
- Xavier Delamarre (born 1954), French linguist, lexicographer and diplomat

== See also ==
- Delamare
