= Delamere =

Delamere may refer to:

== Places ==
=== Australia ===
- Delamere, Northern Territory, a locality
- Delamere, South Australia, a locality
- Delamere Air Weapons Range, Northern Territory
- Delamere Station (pastoral lease), a cattle station in the Northern Territory

=== Canada ===
- Delamere, Ontario

=== England ===
- Delamere, Cheshire
  - Delamere railway station
- Delamere Forest, also in Cheshire
- Leigh Delamere, Wiltshire
- Tedstone Delamere, Herefordshire

== People with the surname ==
- Baron Delamere, a title in the Peerage of the United Kingdom
- John Delamere (footballer) (born 1956), Irish footballer
- Louise Delamere (born 1969), English actress
- Monita Delamere (1921–1993), New Zealand Maori community leader
- Neil Delamere (born 1979), Irish comedian
- Tuariki Delamere (born 1951), New Zealand politician

== See also ==
- Delamere station (disambiguation)
- Baron Delamer (disambiguation)
- Delamerea
- Delamare, a surname
