= Treville, Herefordshire =

Coordinates: 51.9929°N 2.8291°W

Treville
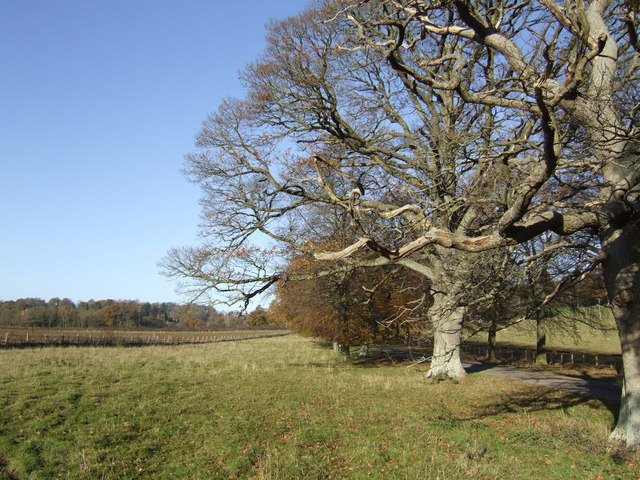

- Location within Herefordshire
- Population: 50 (2001 census)
- Unitary authority: Herefordshire
- Region: West Midlands
- Country: England
- Sovereign state: United Kingdom
- Post town: Hereford
- Postcode district: HR2
- Dialling code: 01981
- Police: West Mercia
- Fire: Hereford and Worcester
- Ambulance: West Midlands
- UK Parliament: Hereford and South Herefordshire

Treville is a rural area and former royal forest in the English county of Herefordshire. It is near Wormbridge and other small settlements.

It was a civil parish from 1858 to 2019 and is now within the parish of Kilpeck. At the 2001 census (one of the last before the abolition of the parish), Treville had a population of 50.

== Medieval history ==
Anciently part of the Welsh-speaking territory of Ergyng, which became Archenfield, Welsh was still being spoken in this part of Herefordshire until at least the 18th century.

Treville is recorded in the Domesday Book of 1086 as "Triveline", an estate containing two ploughlands. Before the Norman Conquest, the land had been held by King Edward and a lord named Alwin; in 1086, the tenant-in-chief was King William, and land was held under him by Cormeilles Abbey in Normandy, Ilbert son of Turold, and Roger of Lacy. There were fourteen households, three smallholders, nine villagers, and two others. The entry also mentions places called Kingstone, Cusop, and Wapleford.

In the year 1230, Henry III granted a royal forest of Treville to John of Monmouth.

In 1320, there was a chantry chapel in the forest of Treville and its control was disputed between Sir Baldwill of Trevville and the Prior of Kilpeck Priory.

== Modern history ==
According to Samuel Lewis's A Topographical Dictionary of England (1831), Treville was then "a liberty (extra-parochial), in the upper division of the hundred of Wormelow... 6 miles (N. W. by N.) from Ross, containing 74 inhabitants."

Treville was in the Poor law union of Dore and the Registration districts of Dore (1837–1838) and Hereford (1838–1974). In 1858 it became a civil parish.

In 1887, John Bartholomew's Gazetteer of the British Isles described Treville as a parish in Herefordshire, six miles north-west of Ross, containing 1540 acres, with a population of 156. A few years later, The Comprehensive Gazetteer of England & Wales (1894) said "Treville, formerly extra-parochial, now a parish, in Herefordshire, 1 mile NW of St Devereux station on the G.W.R., and 8 miles SW of Hereford. Acreage, 1625; population, 142. Whitfield is the chief residence."

Kelly's Directory of Herefordshire (1909) reports that Percy Archer Clive MP of Treville and William Bailey Partridge JP of Bacton were then the main landowners and notes "The soil is clayey and loamy; the subsoil is clay and sandstone. The chief crops are wheat, barley and oats."

== Present day ==
All significant local government services for the locality are now provided by Herefordshire Council. With effect from 1 April 2019, a Community Governance Order made by Herefordshire Council abolished the parish of Treville, merging it into Kilpeck.

== Notable people ==
- Sir Edward Clive (1704–1771) acquired the Wormbridge and Treville estate by a division of family property. It came to his grandfather, George Clive, after he had married the heiress of Martin Husbands, of Wormbridge.
- Edward Bolton Clive (died 1845), of Treville, was appointed as Sheriff of Herefordshire in 1802 and was later a member of parliament for Hereford.
- George Clive (1805–1880), a Liberal politician, grew up at Treville.
- Percy Clive (1873–1918), soldier and member of parliament, lived at Whitfield.
