= Wormbridge =

Village in Herefordshire, England

Coordinates: 51.9752°N 2.8312°W

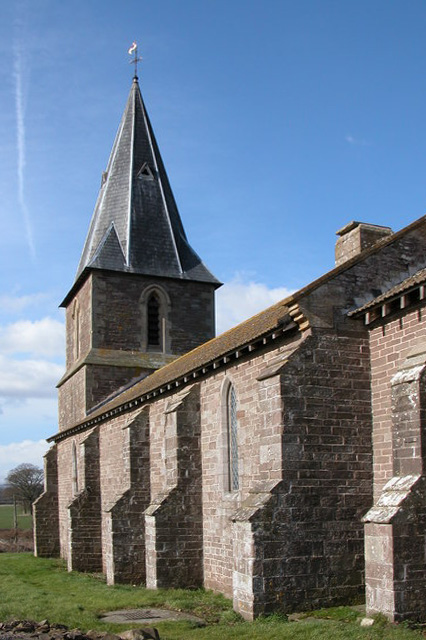
- St Peter's Church, Wormbridge

- Location within Herefordshire
- Population: 59 (2001 census)
- Civil parish: Kilpeck
- Unitary authority: Herefordshire
- Shire county: Herefordshire
- Region: West Midlands
- Country: England
- Sovereign state: United Kingdom
- Post town: HEREFORD
- Postcode district: HR2
- Dialling code: 01981
- Police: West Mercia
- Fire: Hereford and Worcester
- Ambulance: West Midlands
- UK Parliament: Hereford and South Herefordshire

Wormbridge is a village in the civil parish of Kilpeck, in Herefordshire, England, about eight miles (thirteen kilometres) southwest of Hereford, on the A465 road at (SO423316). The neighbouring villages are Kilpeck, Didley, Howton, Treville, Ewyas Harold, Pontrilas and Crizeley. In 2001 the parish had a population of 59.

Until 1 April 2019 the civil parish was part of The Kilpeck Group Parish Council, the civil parish was then merged with Kilpeck. It is home to several local and larger businesses: Theale Fireplaces, Galanthus Gallery and Cafe, Bridges Childcare, Forge Garage and Tack Shop and NFU Mutual. The village previously had a small school, the building being rented from the Whitfield Estate (see below), until closed by Herefordshire Council due to decreasing numbers. The school building is now used by Bridges Childcare, which has been run successfully since 2003.

Historic houses in the village include: Wormbridge Court, Wormbridge House, Fairacre (formerly Lyon Villa) and Trelough House.

Wormbridge and its church were once owned by the Knights Hospitallers of St John of Jerusalem. Some of the church architecture, including the entrance door, is Norman, dating from about 1200. The unbuttressed west tower dates from the 13th century, but the top stage and broach spire were added in 1851–59. The church also holds several memorial plaques belonging to local landowners and a private crypt.

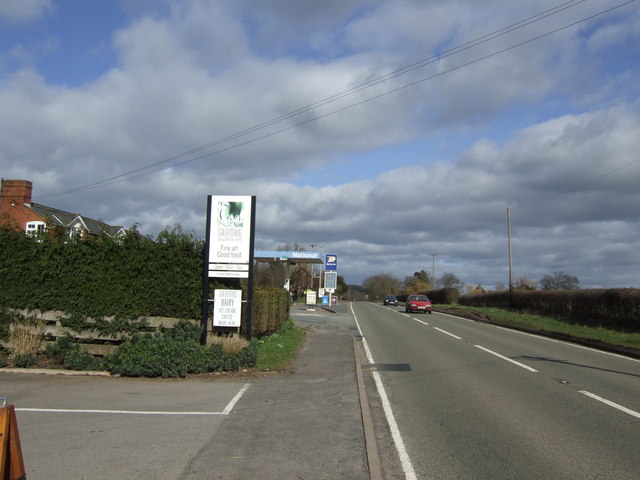
A465 at Wormbridge Looking north-east towards Hereford

Wormbridge Court Farm and the majority of the surrounding land and houses are now owned by Edward George Clive (formally Lennox-Boyd) of Whitfield, grandchild to Lady Mary Katherine Pakenham, sister to Francis Aungier Pakenham, 7th Earl of Longford, Lord Longford.

Wormbridge Court itself was a 17th-century house facing south on the site of the school playground. The basement window openings of that house are still visible in the retaining wall of the playground. The house was demolished circa 1800 when the Clive family moved to Whitfield, two miles (three kilometres) away. The stables were then converted to create Wormbridge Court Farm.

Wormbridge Mill was a watermill on the Worm Brook, which flows near the village. The mill buildings are near Old Mill Farm. Steam power was used to supplement water from about 1890. Milling continued until the early 1920s.
