= Kilpeck =

Village in Herefordshire, England

Coordinates: 51.9697°N 2.8100°W

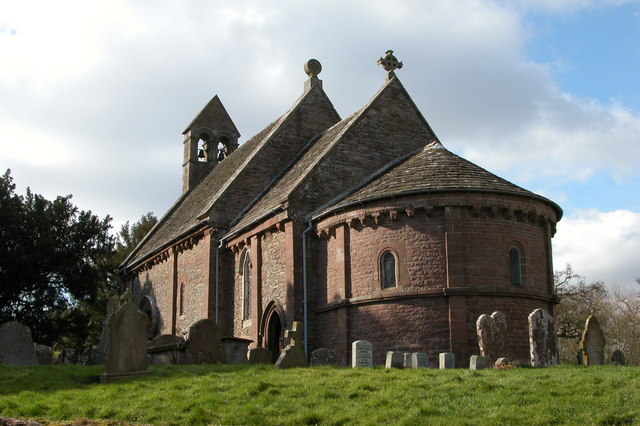
- The Church of St Mary and St David is an outstanding example of Norman architecture.

- Location within Herefordshire
- Population: 215 (2011)
- OS grid reference: SO444304
- Unitary authority: Herefordshire
- Ceremonial county: Herefordshire
- Region: West Midlands
- Country: England
- Sovereign state: United Kingdom
- Post town: HEREFORD
- Postcode district: HR2
- Dialling code: 01981
- Police: West Mercia
- Fire: Hereford and Worcester
- Ambulance: West Midlands
- UK Parliament: Hereford and South Herefordshire

Kilpeck is a village and civil parish in the county of Herefordshire, England. It is about nine miles (14 km) southwest of Hereford, just south of the A465 road and Welsh Marches Line to Abergavenny, and about five miles (8 km) from the border with Wales. On 1 April 2019, the parishes of Kenderchurch, St Devereux, Treville and Wormbridge were merged with Kilpeck.

The village is renowned for its small but outstanding Norman (Romanesque) church, SS Mary and David's, but also has the earthworks of a Norman motte-and-bailey castle that is no longer standing. The church is a Grade I listed building. There is a public house called the Kilpeck Inn, formerly the Red Lion, situated in the centre of the village opposite the village green. Other amenities include a village hall and post office.

== History ==
Until the 9th century, when it was taken over by Mercia, the area around Kilpeck was within the Welsh kingdom of Ergyng. After the Norman conquest, the area became known as Archenfield and was governed as part of the Welsh Marches. It became part of Herefordshire, and England, in the 16th century, although the use of Welsh in the area remained strong until the 19th century. The English name for the village derives from the Welsh name, Llanddewi Kil Peddeg, with Llanddewi meaning "church of St David" and Cil Peddeg probably meaning the "cell of Pedic", an otherwise unknown local early Christian hermit.

In the Domesday Book of 1086, Kilpeck (entered as Chipeete) was given by William the Conqueror to William Fitz Norman de la Mare, son of Norman de la Mare. The clan de la Mare is one of the oldest in Normandy and is descended from Ragnvald Eysteinsson, earl of Møre and Romsdal. According to the Domesday survey, Kilpeck had "3 ploughs, 2 serfs and 4 oxmen and there are 57 men with 19 ploughs." There are mentions of a church on the site possibly from as early as the 7th century. There are vestiges of an enclosure, 200 yds (183 metres) by 300 yds (274 m) in the field, defining an Anglo-Saxon village.

== Landmarks ==
The St Mary and St David's Church was built around 1140. It consists of a nave, chancel and semicircular apse. It is remarkable for its wealth of Norman stone carvings (and their fine state of preservation), both inside and out, all original both in form and position and incorporating many corbels with representations of human faces, hares, fish, fowl, stags etc. Eighty-five of 91 corbels survive, an extraordinarily high percentage.

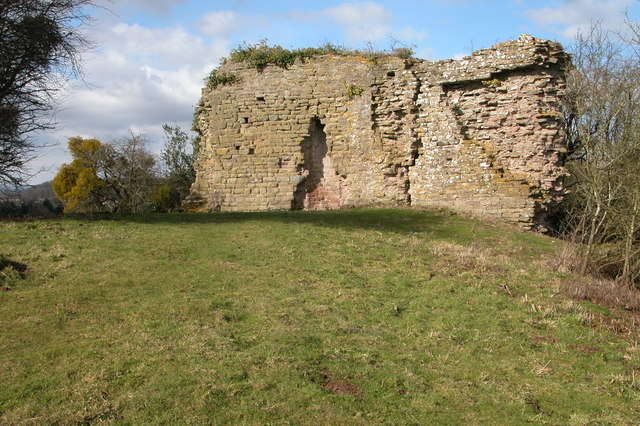
Remains of Kilpeck Castle

West of the church lies a ruined motte and bailey with earthworks. The castle is thought to have been first built around 1090 as the administrative centre of Archenfield. A few walls of the 12th- or 13th-century keep still stand on top of the motte; these are not well preserved. A fireplace and chimney flues are visible, as are two sections of standing castle walls.

A little over a mile to the north is the surviving motte of another castle, at Didley Court Farm.
