= Delamare =

Delamare or De la Mare is a surname of Norman origin. Delamare may refer to:

- Achille Joseph Delamare (1790-1873), French senator.
- Sir Arthur de la Mare (1914–1994), British diplomat
- Delphine Delamare (née Couturier, 1822–1848), French housewife said to have inspired Flaubert's Madame Bovary
- Frederick Archibald de la Mare (1877–1960), New Zealand lawyer and educationalist
- Sir John Delamare (c.1320–1383), courtier of Edward III of England and builder of Nunney Castle in Somerset
- Júlio Delamare (1928-1973), Brazilian sports journalist
- Lise Delamare (1913–2006), French stage and film actress
- Manuel De La Mare (born 1979), Italian music producer and recording artist
- Marisa Delamare, character in His Dark Materials
- Marcel Delamare, character in The Secret Commonwealth
- Sir Peter de la Mare (died c.1387), English politician during the Good Parliament of 1376
- Philip DeLaMare (1823–1915), American Mormon who started a sugar factory in Utah
- Rosine Delamare (1911–2013), French costume designer
- Walter de la Mare (1873–1956), English writer
- William de la Mare (died c.1285), English Franciscan theologian

== See also ==
- Delamere (disambiguation)
- Delamarre
- Baron Delamare
- fr:Delamare Bois, French timber company established in 1690
- Delamare-Deboutteville, French car designed in 1884
- Kornblum–DeLaMare rearrangement, rearrangement reaction in organic chemistry
