= Grade II* listed buildings in Herefordshire (A–L) =

Herefordshire shown in England

There are over 20,000 Grade II* listed buildings in England. This article comprises a list of these buildings in the county of Herefordshire.

== List ==
Name	Location	Type	Completed (Note: The date given is the date used by Historic England as significant for the initial building or that of an important part in the structure's description.)	Date designated	Grid ref. (Note: The grid reference is based on the British national grid reference system, sometimes known as OSGB36, used by the Ordnance Survey.) Geo-coordinates	Entry number (Note: The "List Entry Number" is a unique number assigned to each listed building and scheduled monument by Historic England.)	Image
Abbey House	Ledbury	House	1600	18 September 1953	SO7102937872; 52°02′19″N 2°25′26″W	1349379	Abbey House
Abbots Lodge	Ledbury	House	15th century	5 November 1976	SO7121137706; 52°02′13″N 2°25′16″W	1301823	Abbots Lodge More images
Almeley Manor	Almeley	House	16th century	20 February 1953	SO3314051604; 52°09′31″N 2°58′44″W	1349938	Almeley Manor More images
Amberley Chapel	Amberley, Marden	Chapel	12th century	20 October 1952	SO5465747883; 52°07′39″N 2°39′50″W	1099404	Amberley Chapel More images
Apostles Farmhouse	Kington Rural	Farmhouse	15th century	19 August 1953	SO2850752414; 52°09′55″N 3°02′48″W	1081746	Apostles Farmhouse
Arrow Mill	Arrow Green, Kingsland	Watermill	Late 16th century	11 June 1959	SO4364658721; 52°13′26″N 2°49′35″W	1081828	Arrow Mill More images
Aubrey's Almshouses	Hereford	Timber Framed House	c. 1630	10 June 1952	SO5078139916; 52°03′20″N 2°43′09″W	1205405	Aubrey's Almshouses More images
Aylton Parish Church	Aylton	Parish Church	12th century	6 March 1967	SO6584037666; 52°02′11″N 2°29′58″W	1099070	Aylton Parish Church More images
Barn about 25m east of Brook House	Colwall	Barn	Early 19th century	19 September 1984	SO7524642172; 52°04′38″N 2°21′45″W	1302263	Upload Photo
Barn about 5m north-west of Eardisley Wooton Farmhouse	Eardisley	Barn	13th century	19 August 1953	SO3085550586; 52°08′57″N 3°00′43″W	1157336	Upload Photo
Barn and attached Cow House built onto Glibes Farmhouse	Michaelchurch Escley	Barn	Later alterations	12 November 1984	SO3006137376; 52°01′49″N 3°01′15″W	1223446	Upload Photo
Barn and Cow House about 60m north-west of Court Farmhouse	Aylton	Cruck House	C14-C15	4 December 1985	SO6579337675; 52°02′11″N 2°30′00″W	1099072	Upload Photo
Barn approx. 20m west of Old Hall Farmhouse	Orcop	Barn	15th century	20 May 1987	SO4629025653; 51°55′36″N 2°46′57″W	1301403	Upload Photo
Barn approx. 20m east of Precentor's House	Cathedral Close, Hereford	Aisled Barn	Late 13th century	22 October 1973	SO5107039852; 52°03′18″N 2°42′54″W	1196812	Barn approx. 20m east of Precentor's House
Barn at Treago Farm	St Weonards	House	19th century	30 April 1986	SO4896824179; 51°54′50″N 2°44′36″W	1348800	Barn at Treago Farm More images
Barn to South of Wall Hills Farmhouse	Ledbury	Barn	Later alterations	10 January 1986	SO6948938325; 52°02′33″N 2°26′47″W	1224771	Upload Photo
Barrow Mill	Bearswood Common, Cradley	Timber Framed House	Early 17th century	9 April 1952	SO7320349882; 52°08′48″N 2°23′35″W	1082296	Barrow Mill
Belmont Abbey	Hereford	Abbey	1854-1886	22 October 1986	SO4821638149; 52°02′22″N 2°45′23″W	1099699	Belmont Abbey More images
Belmont House	Belmont Rural	Country House	1788-90	8 September 1981	SO4768138741; 52°02′40″N 2°45′51″W	1167079	Upload Photo
Bernithan Court	Bernithan, Llangarron	House	Earlier	18 May 1953	SO5407721494; 51°53′24″N 2°40′07″W	1099439	Bernithan Court More images
Berrington House	Hereford	House	c. 1635	10 June 1952	SO5079139814; 52°03′16″N 2°43′09″W	1279761	Upload Photo
Bewell House	Hereford	House	Mid 18th century	22 November 1972	SO5073940088; 52°03′25″N 2°43′12″W	1205430	Bewell House More images
Black Hall	King's Pyon	House	Early 17th century	20 February 1953	SO4373050505; 52°09′00″N 2°49′26″W	1301676	Upload Photo
Black Hall	Aston, Kingsland	Farmhouse	14th century	11 June 1959	SO4608062949; 52°15′43″N 2°47′29″W	1349878	Upload Photo
Black Lion Inn	Hereford	Box Frame House	Early 17th century	10 June 1952	SO5077039678; 52°03′12″N 2°43′10″W	1205517	Black Lion Inn More images
Bleathwood Manor	Little Hereford	Farmhouse	Early 17th century	11 June 1959	SO5607069676; 52°19′24″N 2°38′45″W	1301094	Upload Photo
Blue Leader	3 Widemarsh Street, Hereford	House	Late 18th century	10 June 1952	SO5095740061; 52°03′24″N 2°43′00″W	1207947	Blue Leader
Bodcott Farmhouse	Dorstone	Farmhouse	Mid 16th century	29 September 1952	SO3374743103; 52°04′56″N 2°58′06″W	1168073	Upload Photo
Bollingham Chapel	Eardisley	Chapel	13th century	16 October 1967	SO3017352695; 52°10′05″N 3°01′21″W	1157325	Bollingham Chapel More images
Bollitree Castle Farmhouse	Weston under Penyard	Farmhouse	c. 1700	18 May 1953	SO6364424023; 51°54′49″N 2°31′48″W	1099638	Upload Photo
Booth Hall Hotel	Hereford	Timber Framed House	15th century	10 June 1952	SO5106639998; 52°03′22″N 2°42′54″W	1196827	Booth Hall Hotel More images
Brand Lodge	Colwall	House	1910	18 November 1952	SO7658741232; 52°04′08″N 2°20′35″W	1349714	Upload Photo
Bridge Farmhouse	Wellington	House	16th century	20 October 1952	SO4985448230; 52°07′48″N 2°44′02″W	1179775	Upload Photo
Broadfield Court	Bodenham	House	14th century	11 June 1959	SO5450553077; 52°10′27″N 2°40′00″W	1082023	Broadfield Court More images
Brockhampton Chapel	Brockhampton-by-Bromyard, Brockhampton	Chapel	Built 1798	9 June 1967	SO6835554889; 52°11′29″N 2°27′52″W	1349630	Brockhampton Chapel More images
Brockhampton Park	Brockhampton Park, Brockhampton	Country House	Mid 18th century	9 June 1967	SO6863955037; 52°11′34″N 2°27′37″W	1176659	Brockhampton Park More images
Bronsil Castle Bridge and Moat	Eastnor	Castle	Mid 15th century	6 March 1967	SO7496937179; 52°01′57″N 2°21′59″W	1156646	Bronsil Castle Bridge and Moat More images
Brook House	Colwall	Farmhouse	17th century	18 November 1952	SO7520642172; 52°04′38″N 2°21′47″W	1082126	Upload Photo
Broomy Hill Pumping Station	Hereford	Pumping station	1856	15 March 2015	SO4966739316; 52°03′00″N 2°44′07″W	1422752	Broomy Hill Pumping Station More images
Building in Yard to rear of Nos 40 and 42, Broad St	Leominster	Guest House	late C15/early 16th century	31 August 1989	SO4962459261; 52°13′45″N 2°44′20″W	1255399	Upload Photo
Burton Court	Eardisland	Country House	c. 1808	20 February 1953	SO4228457190; 52°12′36″N 2°50′46″W	1081945	Burton Court More images
Bush Farmhouse and attached Barn to North East	Coddington	Farmhouse	C16-C17	18 November 1952	SO7341443105; 52°05′08″N 2°23′22″W	1157254	Upload Photo
Byford Court	Byford	House	16th century	20 February 1953	SO3963842939; 52°04′53″N 2°52′56″W	1157633	Byford Court More images
Caradoc Court	Sellack	Country House	16th century	18 May 1953	SO5586627485; 51°56′39″N 2°38′36″W	1214935	Upload Photo
Castle End	Lea	House	17th century	18 May 1953	SO6545321948; 51°53′42″N 2°30′12″W	1348810	Upload Photo
Chandos	Much Marcle	Farmhouse	Late 16th century	18 November 1952	SO6433834470; 52°00′27″N 2°31′15″W	1099043	Upload Photo
Chapel approximately 30m north of Chapel Farmhouse	Yatton	Parish Church	Mid 12th century	25 February 1966	SO6270130392; 51°58′15″N 2°32′40″W	1099211	Chapel approximately 30m north of Chapel Farmhouse More images
Chapel of St John	Much Fawley, Brockhampton	Chapel	12th century	25 February 1966	SO5905229555; 51°57′47″N 2°35′51″W	1099265	Chapel of St John More images
Chapel of St John of Jerusalem	Dinmore	Chapel	Late 12th century	15 July 1985	SO4860250276; 52°08′54″N 2°45′09″W	1348966	Chapel of St John of Jerusalem
Church of All Saints	Coddington	Church	C12-C13	6 March 1967	SO7183642680; 52°04′54″N 2°24′45″W	1082177	Church of All Saints More images
Church of All Saints	Eyton	Parish Church	12th century	11 June 1959	SO4750961557; 52°14′59″N 2°46′13″W	1081863	Church of All Saints More images
Church of All Saints	Hereford	Parish Church	13th century	10 June 1952	SO5089240043; 52°03′24″N 2°43′03″W	1025105	Church of All Saints More images
Church of All Saints	Kinsham	Parish Church	Late 13th century or early 14th century	17 December 1986	SO3643464910; 52°16′43″N 2°55′59″W	1081486	Church of All Saints More images
Church of All Saints	Monkland	Parish Church	12th century	11 June 1959	SO4603357671; 52°12′53″N 2°47′29″W	1349845	Church of All Saints More images
Church of St Andrew	Allensmore	Parish Church	12th century	26 January 1967	SO4662935875; 52°01′07″N 2°46′45″W	1099725	Church of St Andrew More images
Church of St Andrew	Leinthall Earls, Aymestrey	Chapel	12th century	11 June 1959	SO4430267885; 52°18′22″N 2°49′06″W	1082117	Church of St Andrew More images
Church of St Andrew	Bredwardine	Parish Church	Early 12th century	26 January 1967	SO3347644500; 52°05′41″N 2°58′21″W	1099515	Church of St Andrew More images
Church of St Andrew	Evesbatch	Parish Church	Medieval origins	9 June 1967	SO6863348138; 52°07′50″N 2°27′35″W	1349690	Church of St Andrew More images
Church of St Andrew	Pixley	Parish Church	13th century	6 March 1967	SO6608638800; 52°02′48″N 2°29′45″W	1098989	Church of St Andrew More images
Church of St Andrew	Wolferlow	Church	Early 12th century	9 June 1967	SO6686561723; 52°15′10″N 2°29′13″W	1217197	Church of St Andrew More images
Church of St Andrew and St Mary	How Caple	Parish Church	14th century	25 February 1966	SO6115930542; 51°58′19″N 2°34′01″W	1166452	Church of St Andrew and St Mary More images
Church of St Anna	Thornbury	Church	Early 12th century	9 June 1967	SO6221859674; 52°14′02″N 2°33′17″W	1234834	Church of St Anna More images
Church of St Bartholomew	Ashperton	Chapel of Ease	Mid 13th century	6 March 1967	SO6425841493; 52°04′14″N 2°31′22″W	1098909	Church of St Bartholomew More images
Church of St Bartholomew	Docklow, Docklow and Hampton Wafer	Parish Church	12th century	11 June 1959	SO5641657518; 52°12′51″N 2°38′22″W	1349778	Church of St Bartholomew More images
Church of St Bartholomew	Munsley	Parish Church	12th century	6 March 1967	SO6623940937; 52°03′57″N 2°29′38″W	1098876	Church of St Bartholomew More images
Church of St Bridget	Bridstow	Parish Church	12th century	26 March 1987	SO5846024836; 51°55′14″N 2°36′19″W	1214131	Church of St Bridget More images
Church of St David	Little Dewchurch	Parish Church	14th century	26 January 1967	SO5295031759; 51°58′56″N 2°41′11″W	1157474	Church of St David More images
Church of St Denys	Pencoyd	Church	14th century	30 April 1986	SO5160826555; 51°56′07″N 2°42′19″W	1348774	Church of St Denys More images
Church of St Dubricius	Ballingham	Parish Church	13th century to 15th century	26 March 1987	SO5760031650; 51°58′54″N 2°37′08″W	1214127	Church of St Dubricius More images
Church of St Dubricius	Hentland	Parish church	c. 1300	26 March 1987	SO5430626391; 51°56′03″N 2°39′58″W	1288593	Church of St Dubricius More images
Church of St Dubricius	St Devereux	Church	13th century	26 January 1967	SO4408931223; 51°58′36″N 2°48′55″W	1099585	Church of St Dubricius More images
Church of St Dubricius	Whitchurch	Parish Church	13th century	3 July 1985	SO5561917496; 51°51′15″N 2°38′45″W	1224924	Church of St Dubricius More images
Church of St Faith	Bacton	Parish Church	C13-C16	26 January 1967	SO3708332382; 51°59′11″N 2°55′03″W	1098657	Church of St Faith More images
Church of St Faith	Dorstone	Parish Church	Medieval	16 January 1967	SO3146041797; 52°04′13″N 3°00′05″W	1348887	Church of St Faith More images
Church of St Francis Xavier	Hereford	Roman Catholic Church	c. 1839	10 June 1952	SO5093939880; 52°03′18″N 2°43′01″W	1297462	Church of St Francis Xavier More images
Church of St George	Woolhope	Church	12th century	6 March 1967	SO6115535785; 52°01′09″N 2°34′03″W	1156792	Church of St George More images
Church of St Giles	Acton Beauchamp	Church	late Norman	9 June 1967	SO6794850310; 52°09′00″N 2°28′11″W	1082414	Church of St Giles More images
Church of St Giles	Goodrich	Parish Church	13th century	25 February 1966	SO5721819051; 51°52′06″N 2°37′22″W	1157263	Church of St Giles More images
Church of St James	Colwall	Church	12th century	6 March 1967	SO7390242309; 52°04′43″N 2°22′56″W	1178404	Church of St James More images
Church of St James	Cradley	Parish Church	12th-century origins	9 June 1967	SO7360547135; 52°07′19″N 2°23′13″W	1082298	Church of St James More images
Church of St James	Kimbolton	Parish Church	12th century	11 June 1959	SO5259561618; 52°15′02″N 2°41′45″W	1082568	Church of St James More images
Church of St James	Stanford Bishop	Parish Church	c. 1200	9 June 1967	SO6820751561; 52°09′41″N 2°27′58″W	1276170	Church of St James More images
Church of St James	Tedstone Delamere	Church	Preconquest	9 June 1967	SO6956058557; 52°13′28″N 2°26′49″W	1234705	Church of St James More images
Church of St James the Great	Ocle Pychard	Parish Church	14th century	9 June 1967	SO5955046221; 52°06′46″N 2°35′32″W	1276199	Church of St James the Great More images
Church of St John Baptist	Llanrothal	Parish Church	12th century	25 February 1966	SO4706618589; 51°51′48″N 2°46′12″W	1348962	Church of St John Baptist More images
Church of St John Baptist	Weston Beggard	Anglican Church	1881	11 October 1985	SO5839041236; 52°04′05″N 2°36′30″W	1348736	Church of St John Baptist More images
Church of St John the Baptist	Aston Ingham	Church	13th century	17 March 1987	SO6836223567; 51°54′35″N 2°27′41″W	1099646	Church of St John the Baptist More images
Church of St John the Baptist	Lea	Church	Late 13th century	17 March 1987	SO6576221743; 51°53′35″N 2°29′56″W	1099652	Church of St John the Baptist More images
Church of St John the Baptist	Llanwarne	Church	13th century	30 April 1986	SO5060828218; 51°57′01″N 2°43′12″W	1301841	Church of St John the Baptist More images
Church of St John the Baptist	Mathon	Church	Norman	6 March 1967	SO7336745846; 52°06′37″N 2°23′25″W	1302229	Church of St John the Baptist More images
Church of St John the Baptist	Orcop	Parish Church	Early 13th century	26 January 1967	SO4738926270; 51°55′57″N 2°46′00″W	1157843	Church of St John the Baptist More images
Church of St John the Baptist	Whitbourne	Church	Late 12th century	9 June 1967	SO7251956939; 52°12′36″N 2°24′13″W	1217070	Church of St John the Baptist More images
Church of St Junabius	Llandinabo	Church	Medieval	30 April 1986	SO5184028439; 51°57′08″N 2°42′08″W	1302116	Church of St Junabius More images
Church of St Laurence	Preston on Wye	Parish Church	12th century	2 September 1966	SO3837942446; 52°04′37″N 2°54′02″W	1081856	Church of St Laurence More images
Church of St Lawrence	Bishopstone	Parish church	1854	2 September 1966	SO4159043897; 52°05′25″N 2°51′14″W	1081874	Church of St Lawrence More images
Church of St Lawrence	Weston under Penyard	Church	Late 12th century	17 March 1987	SO6313323235; 51°54′23″N 2°32′14″W	1348828	Church of St Lawrence More images
Church of St Leonard	Yarpole, Croft and Yarpole	Parish Church	Early 14th century	11 June 1959	SO4698664868; 52°16′46″N 2°46′43″W	1296754	Church of St Leonard More images
Church of St Leonard	Hatfield, Hatfield and Newhampton	Parish Church	11th century	11 June 1959	SO5858659384; 52°13′52″N 2°36′28″W	1082567	Church of St Leonard More images
Church of St Luke	Stoke Prior	Parish Church	14th century	21 May 1987	SO5197656490; 52°12′16″N 2°42′15″W	1157842	Church of St Luke More images
Church of St Luke	Ullingswick	Parish Church	12th century	9 June 1967	SO5966349937; 52°08′46″N 2°35′27″W	1234909	Church of St Luke More images
Church of St Margaret	Welsh Bicknor	Parish Church	Earlier	3 July 1985	SO5922917674; 51°51′22″N 2°35′36″W	1348965	Church of St Margaret More images
Church of St Margaret Churchyard cross	Wellington	Cross	14th century or 15th century	15 July 1985	SO4973748196; 52°07′47″N 2°44′08″W	1348970	Church of St Margaret Churchyard cross More images
Church of St Mary	Bishop's Frome	Church	12th century	9 June 1967	SO6634048313; 52°07′56″N 2°29′35″W	1349597	Church of St Mary More images
Church of St Mary	Brinsop and Wormsley	Parish Church	12th century	2 September 1966	SO4274947794; 52°07′32″N 2°50′16″W	1301626	Church of St Mary More images
Church of St Mary	Burghill	Parish Church	12th century	27 January 1967	SO4793444501; 52°05′47″N 2°45′41″W	1099280	Church of St Mary More images
Church of St Mary	Clifford	Parish Church	12th century	26 January 1967	SO2514945025; 52°05′55″N 3°05′39″W	1348871	Church of St Mary More images
Church of St Mary	Craswall	Schoolroom	19th century	26 January 1967	SO2815036282; 52°01′13″N 3°02′55″W	1078203	Church of St Mary More images
Church of St Mary	Cusop	Parish Church	Early 12th century	26 January 1967	SO2400541540; 52°04′01″N 3°06′36″W	1168008	Church of St Mary More images
Church of St Mary	Eardisland	Parish Church	Early 13th century	2 September 1966	SO4204858520; 52°13′19″N 2°50′59″W	1349843	Church of St Mary More images
Church of St Mary	Hope under Dinmore	Parish Church	14th century or earlier	11 June 1959	SO5105852826; 52°10′17″N 2°43′01″W	1301623	Church of St Mary More images
Church of St Mary	Humber	Parish Church	13th century or earlier	11 June 1959	SO5356656338; 52°12′12″N 2°40′51″W	1157768	Church of St Mary More images
Church of St Mary	Little Birch	Parish Church	1869	21 May 1987	SO5114831187; 51°58′37″N 2°42′45″W	1348854	Church of St Mary More images
Church of St Mary	Turnastone	Parish Church	12th century	26 January 1967	SO3574536477; 52°01′23″N 2°56′16″W	1224950	Church of St Mary More images
Church of St Mary	Tyberton	Parish Church	1720	21 February 1986	SO3802339889; 52°03′14″N 2°54′19″W	1348758	Church of St Mary More images
Church of St Mary Magdalene	Elton, Leinthall Starkes	Parish Church	12th century	11 June 1959	SO4418770028; 52°19′32″N 2°49′13″W	1081770	Church of St Mary Magdalene More images
Church of St Mary Magdalene	Little Hereford	Parish Church	12th century	11 June 1959	SO5538968006; 52°18′30″N 2°39′21″W	1082535	Church of St Mary Magdalene More images
Church of St Mary Magdalene	Stretton Sugwas	Parish Church	1877-80	27 January 1967	SO4596442026; 52°04′26″N 2°47′23″W	1296537	Church of St Mary Magdalene More images
Church of St Michael	Brampton Abbotts	Parish Church	12th century	25 February 1966	SO6009626411; 51°56′05″N 2°34′55″W	1099258	Church of St Michael More images
Church of St Michael	Brimfield	Parish Church	13th century	11 June 1959	SO5268467493; 52°18′13″N 2°41′43″W	1349854	Church of St Michael More images
Church of St Michael	Dewsall	Parish Church	12th century	26 January 1967	SO4861733492; 51°59′51″N 2°44′59″W	1167194	Church of St Michael More images
Church of St Michael	Edwyn Ralph	Church	12th century	9 June 1967	SO6452057498; 52°12′52″N 2°31′15″W	1177450	Church of St Michael More images
Church of St Michael	Hope Mansell	Church	12th century	17 March 1987	SO6254219646; 51°52′27″N 2°32′44″W	1348808	Church of St Michael More images
Church of St Michael	Knill	Parish Church	Late 12th century and early 13th century	16 October 1967	SO2911360467; 52°14′16″N 3°02′22″W	1081487	Church of St Michael More images
Church of St Michael	Mansel Lacy	Parish Church	12th century	2 September 1966	SO4255745565; 52°06′20″N 2°50′24″W	1081951	Church of St Michael More images
Church of St Michael	Michaelchurch Escley	Parish Church	12th century	26 January 1967	SO3167234186; 52°00′07″N 2°59′48″W	1223432	Church of St Michael More images
Church of St Michael	Sollers Hope	Parish Church	14th century	25 February 1966	SO6124933118; 51°59′43″N 2°33′57″W	1349011	Church of St Michael More images
Church of St Michael	Sutton St Michael, Sutton	Church	12th century	26 January 1967	SO5264645824; 52°06′31″N 2°41′34″W	1348978	Church of St Michael More images
Church of St Michael	Upper Sapey	Church	mid to late 12th century	9 June 1967	SO6827663617; 52°16′11″N 2°27′59″W	1275895	Church of St Michael More images
Church of St Michael and All Angels	Bodenham	Parish Church	c. 1200	11 June 1959	SO5299050888; 52°09′15″N 2°41′19″W	1349790	Church of St Michael and All Angels More images
Church of St Michael and All Angels	Kingstone	Parish Church	12th century	21 February 1986	SO4244335700; 52°01′00″N 2°50′24″W	1178447	Church of St Michael and All Angels More images
Church of St Michael and All Angels	Lyonshall	Parish Church	Late 12th century	16 October 1967	SO3310256258; 52°12′02″N 2°58′49″W	1349918	Church of St Michael and All Angels More images
Church of St Nicholas	Norton Canon	Parish Church	13th century	2 September 1966	SO3820547756; 52°07′29″N 2°54′15″W	1157795	Church of St Nicholas More images
Church of St Nicholas	Sutton St Nicholas, Sutton	Parish Church	12th century	21 January 1967	SO5340545351; 52°06′16″N 2°40′54″W	1348981	Church of St Nicholas More images
Church of St Peter	Dormington	Parish church	1877	26 January 1967	SO5832040196; 52°03′31″N 2°36′34″W	1099882	Church of St Peter More images
Church of St Peter	Hereford	Parish Church	Late C13/Early 14th century	10 June 1952	SO5115640014; 52°03′23″N 2°42′50″W	1196883	Church of St Peter More images
Church of St Peter	Llancillo	Parish Church	11th century OR 12th century	26 January 1967	SO3662025567; 51°55′30″N 2°55′23″W	1078169	Church of St Peter More images
Church of St Peter	Lugwardine	Anglican Church	1871-2	26 January 1967	SO5509041034; 52°03′57″N 2°39′24″W	1099844	Church of St Peter More images
Church of St Peter	Peterstow	Parish Church	Anglo Saxon	26 March 1987	SO5639024902; 51°55′15″N 2°38′08″W	1214804	Church of St Peter More images
Church of St Peter	Pipe and Lyde	Parish Church	late 12th century or 13th century	27 January 1967	SO5028244091; 52°05′35″N 2°43′38″W	1172739	Church of St Peter More images
Church of St Peter	Pudleston	Parish Church	c. 1200	11 June 1959	SO5652959765; 52°14′04″N 2°38′17″W	1082544	Church of St Peter More images
Church of St Peter	Withington	Parish Church	12th century	26 January 1967	SO5657443486; 52°05′17″N 2°38′07″W	1349003	Church of St Peter More images
Church of St Peter and St Paul	Whitney-on-Wye	Parish Church	12th century	16 October 1967	SO2673347544; 52°07′17″N 3°04′18″W	1349557	Church of St Peter and St Paul More images
Church of St Philip and St James	Tarrington	Church	12th century	6 March 1967	SO6186140688; 52°03′48″N 2°33′28″W	1302745	Church of St Philip and St James More images
Church of St Mary	Brilley	Parish Church	12th century	16 October 1967	SO2604449215; 52°08′11″N 3°04′55″W	1082516	Church of St Mary More images
Church of St Michael	Winforton, Willersley and Winforton	Parish Church	13th century or earlier	16 October 1967	SO2987046973; 52°07′00″N 3°01′32″W	1301508	Church of St Michael More images
Church of St Thomas of Canterbury	Huntington	Parish Church	c. 1300	16 October 1967	SO2494653380; 52°10′25″N 3°05′56″W	1349556	Church of St Thomas of Canterbury More images
Church of the Holy Rood	Mordiford	Anglican Church	c. 1811	26 January 1967	SO5704737449; 52°02′02″N 2°37′39″W	1179735	Church of the Holy Rood More images
Church of the Holy Trinity	Preston Wynne	Parish Church	1727	26 January 1967	SO5587846580; 52°06′57″N 2°38′45″W	1302088	Church of the Holy Trinity More images
Churchyard Cross	Coddington	Cross	C14-C15	6 March 1967	SO7184542670; 52°04′54″N 2°24′44″W	1157237	Churchyard Cross More images
Churchyard Cross	Colwall	Cross	C14-C15	18 November 1952	SO7391942292; 52°04′42″N 2°22′55″W	1349729	Churchyard Cross More images
Churchyard Cross	Hampton Bishop	Cross	14th century	26 January 1967	SO5587838023; 52°02′20″N 2°38′41″W	1099870	Churchyard Cross More images
Churchyard Cross	Mordiford	Cross	14th century or 15th century	26 January 1967	SO5705837437; 52°02′01″N 2°37′39″W	1099815	Churchyard Cross More images
Churchyard Cross	Walterstone	Cross	15th century or early 16th century	26 January 1967	SO3405924961; 51°55′09″N 2°57′37″W	1342147	Upload Photo
Churchyard Cross about 20m south of the Tower of the Church of the Nativity of the Blessed Virgin Mary	Madley	Cross	14th century	26 January 1962	SO4197438700; 52°02′37″N 2°50′51″W	1178625	Churchyard Cross about 20m south of the Tower of the Church of the Nativity of the Blessed Virgin Mary More images
Churchyard Cross and Base about 20m south of Chancel of Putley Parish Church	Putley	Steps	14th century	6 March 1967	SO6461337593; 52°02′08″N 2°31′02″W	1098968	Churchyard Cross and Base about 20m south of Chancel of Putley Parish Church More images
Churchyard Cross about 5m south of South Porch of Church of St Dubricius	Whitchurch	Cross	1698	14 February 1966	SO5561717482; 51°51′15″N 2°38′45″W	1225239	Churchyard Cross about 5m south of South Porch of Church of St Dubricius More images
67, Owen Street and City Wall to rear	Hereford	House and city wall	Early 19th century	22 October 1973	SO5138039794; 52°03′16″N 2°42′38″W	1196877	Upload Photo
Clear Brook	Pembridge	Farmhouse	Late 16th century	19 August 1953	SO3897558989; 52°13′33″N 2°53′41″W	1081755	Clear Brook More images
Coningsby Hospital, including Chapel	Hereford	Courtyard	c. 1614	10 June 1952	SO5112640460; 52°03′37″N 2°42′51″W	1196898	Coningsby Hospital, including Chapel More images
Conservative Club	Hereford	House	18th century	10 June 1952	SO5103939946; 52°03′21″N 2°42′56″W	1297440	Upload Photo
Court Farmhouse	Preston Wynne	Farmhouse	14th century	20 October 1952	SO5574947005; 52°07′10″N 2°38′52″W	1099380	Upload Photo
Court House Farmhouse	Richards Castle (Hereford)	Farmhouse	Early 17th century	11 June 1959	SO4914769834; 52°19′27″N 2°44′51″W	1349875	Upload Photo
Court of Noke	Pembridge	Country House	Early 18th century	19 August 1953	SO3719059608; 52°13′52″N 2°55′16″W	1349923	Court of Noke More images
Cross in Churchyard of St Mary the Virgin	Ross-on-Wye	Cross	14th century	22 October 1952	SO5984124082; 51°54′50″N 2°35′07″W	1098721	Cross in Churchyard of St Mary the Virgin More images
Cwarelau and Barn adjoining to North	Newton	Farmhouse	16th century or earlier	29 September 1952	SO3417231618; 51°58′45″N 2°57′35″W	1224503	Upload Photo
Cwmmau Farmhouse and adjoining Cowhouse	Brilley	Farmhouse	Early 17th century	19 August 1953	SO2766651106; 52°09′13″N 3°03′31″W	1349554	Cwmmau Farmhouse and adjoining Cowhouse More images
Dingwood Park Farmhouse	Ledbury	Farmhouse	c1690's	18 November 1952	SO7208535212; 52°00′53″N 2°24′29″W	1082600	Upload Photo
Dovecot about 70m south East of Stockton Bury Farmhouse (not listed)	Stockton, Kimbolton	Dovecote	16th century OR 17th century	11 June 1959	SO5172960997; 52°14′42″N 2°42′30″W	1166938	Upload Photo
Dovecote about 20m north of Hellens	Much Marcle	Dovecote	1641	18 November 1952	SO6614433269; 51°59′49″N 2°29′40″W	1303025	Dovecote about 20m north of Hellens More images
Dovecote about 50m west of Barton Court	Colwall	Dovecote	late medieval-C16	18 November 1952	SO7413940893; 52°03′57″N 2°22′43″W	1178618	Upload Photo
Dovecote South East of Netherwood	Thornbury	Dovecote	Medieval	9 April 1952	SO6331160704; 52°14′36″N 2°32′20″W	1234908	Upload Photo
Dovecote South of Cowarne Court	Much Cowarne	Dovecote	probably medieval	9 April 1952	SO6143346372; 52°06′52″N 2°33′53″W	1349680	Dovecote South of Cowarne Court
Dutch Barn or Silage Clamp at NGR 4080 4122, Lulham Court Farm	Madley	Hay Barn	1885	20 May 1987	SO4082941230; 52°03′59″N 2°51′53″W	1099793	Upload Photo
Elgar Court	Hereford	Apartment	Late C20	21 November 1990	SO5258639231; 52°02′58″N 2°41′34″W	1187687	Upload Photo
Episcopal Palace, including Gatehouse and attached Ranges and Wall	Hereford	Bishops Palace	C12-C17	10 June 1952	SO5096339711; 52°03′13″N 2°43′00″W	1206091	Episcopal Palace, including Gatehouse and attached Ranges and Wall More images
Estate Building, Home Farmhouse	Moccas Park, Moccas	Farm building	1783-4	23 September 1987	SO3585243414; 52°05′07″N 2°56′15″W	1081853	Upload Photo
Eyton Court	Eyton	House	late 15th century to early 16th century	11 June 1959	SO4742661438; 52°14′55″N 2°46′17″W	1349857	Eyton Court More images
Fawley Court	Fawley, Brockhampton	Country House	Early 16th century	18 May 1953	SO5774730136; 51°58′05″N 2°36′59″W	1157774	Fawley Court More images
Forge Bridge (that part in Burrington Civil Parish)	Burrington	Accommodation Bridge	c. 1772	11 June 1959	SO4539774970; 52°22′12″N 2°48′12″W	1081798	Forge Bridge (that part in Burrington Civil Parish) More images
Forge Bridge and Weir (those parts in Leintwardine)	Leintwardine	Weir	c. 1772	11 June 1959	SO4539474993; 52°22′13″N 2°48′12″W	1301691	Forge Bridge and Weir (those parts in Leintwardine) More images
Former Church of St John the Baptist	Aconbury	Church	13th century	26 January 1967	SO5167833516; 51°59′53″N 2°42′19″W	1348863	Former Church of St John the Baptist More images
Forsythia and West Leigh	Pembridge	House	15th century	16 June 1987	SO3894258139; 52°13′05″N 2°53′43″W	1349914	Upload Photo
Friends' Meeting House	Almeley Wootton, Almeley	Friends Meeting House	1672	2 September 1966	SO3327752423; 52°09′58″N 2°58′37″W	1157537	Friends' Meeting House More images
Garden Temple about 500m east of Church of St John the Evangelist	Shobdon Park, Shobdon	Garden Temple	c. 1750	9 December 1986	SO4057062818; 52°15′37″N 2°52′20″W	1349767	Upload Photo
Garden Wall, Gate Piers and Gates to Bernithan Court	Bernithan, Llangarron	Gate	Early 18th century	18 May 1963	SO5405021479; 51°53′24″N 2°40′09″W	1099440	Upload Photo
Garnons	Mansell Gammage	House	19th century	28 February 1986	SO3941943895; 52°03′08″N 2°31′32″W	1000881	Garnons
Gate House	Hereford	House	19th century	10 June 1952	SO5103440209; 52°03′29″N 2°42′56″W	1293348	Gate House More images
Gate in South Wall of the Prospect	Ross-on-Wye	Gate	1700	22 October 1952	SO5969024018; 51°54′48″N 2°35′15″W	1349264	Upload Photo
Gate Piers in East Wall of the Prospect	Ross-on-Wye	Gate Pier	1700	22 October 1952	SO5974824038; 51°54′48″N 2°35′12″W	1098722	Upload Photo
Gate, Gate Piers and adjacent Walls about 20m east of the South Aisle of the Church of St Cuthbert	Holme Lacy	Gate	later 17th century	21 May 1987	SO5687234742; 52°00′34″N 2°37′47″W	1157358	Gate, Gate Piers and adjacent Walls about 20m east of the South Aisle of the Church of St Cuthbert
Gatehouse about 25m north-north-west of Butthouse	King's Pyon	Gatehouse	1632	20 February 1953	SO4417648829; 52°08′06″N 2°49′01″W	1301690	Gatehouse about 25m north-north-west of Butthouse
Gates, Gate Piers and Walls enclosing Garden East of Langstone Court	Llangarron	Gate	Early 18th century	18 May 1953	SO5345622016; 51°53′41″N 2°40′40″W	1302348	Upload Photo
Gatley Park	Leinthall Earls, Aymestrey	Country House	1630s	11 June 1959	SO4488068462; 52°18′41″N 2°48′36″W	1082116	Gatley Park More images
Gazebo in Garden of 29, Castle Street	Hereford	Gazebo	17th century	22 October 1973	SO5116239690; 52°03′12″N 2°42′49″W	1196806	Upload Photo
Gillow Manor	Hentland	Moat	Late 14th century	18 May 1953	SO5308825352; 51°55′29″N 2°41′01″W	1214488	Upload Photo
Glibes Farmhouse	Michaelchurch Escley	Farmhouse	17th century	12 November 1984	SO3007837381; 52°01′49″N 3°01′14″W	1223549	Upload Photo
Granary approx 10m south-west of Hergest Court	Hergest, Kington Rural	Granary	16th century	19 August 1953	SO2812155398; 52°11′32″N 3°03′11″W	1166605	Upload Photo
Grange Court	Leominster	House	1954	24 July 1954	SO4993059091; 52°13′40″N 2°44′04″W	1077616	Grange Court More images
Grange Farmhouse	Abbey Dore	Farmhouse	14th century or 15th century	29 September 1952	SO4034631166; 51°58′33″N 2°52′12″W	1099800	Upload Photo
Greyfriars Surgery	Hereford	House	13th century	22 October 1973	SO5072839732; 52°03′14″N 2°43′12″W	1297419	Upload Photo
Hall Court	Much Marcle	House	Early 17th century	18 November 1952	SO6439935365; 52°00′56″N 2°31′13″W	1349114	Upload Photo
Haywood Lodge	Haywood	Farmhouse	Early 18th century	16 December 1975	SO4842436476; 52°01′27″N 2°45′11″W	1296921	Upload Photo
Heath House	Leintwardine	Country House	c. 1660	11 June 1959	SO3830676524; 52°23′00″N 2°54′28″W	1180036	Upload Photo
Hellens	Much Marcle	House	16th century	18 November 1952	SO6614633244; 51°59′48″N 2°29′40″W	1099048	Hellens More images
Hereford Lodge, Gate Piers to West and Flanking Brick Wall to East	Stoke Edith	Gate Pier	c. 1792	26 January 1967	SO5986440711; 52°03′48″N 2°35′13″W	1179796	Upload Photo
Hergest Court	Hergest, Kington Rural	Farmhouse	Earlier	19 August 1953	SO2814155419; 52°11′32″N 3°03′10″W	1081747	Hergest Court More images
Hill End Farmhouse with adjoining Hop Kilns	Weston Beggard	Farmhouse	1601	20 October 1952	SO5787141469; 52°04′12″N 2°36′58″W	1301761	Hill End Farmhouse with adjoining Hop Kilns More images
Homme House	Much Marcle	House	16th century	18 November 1952	SO6538131827; 51°59′02″N 2°30′20″W	1099009	Homme House More images
Hope Farmhouse	Edvin Loach and Saltmarshe	Farmhouse	16th century	9 April 1952	SO6635259024; 52°13′42″N 2°29′39″W	1177437	Upload Photo
Huntley's Farmhouse	Much Marcle	Farmhouse	16th century	18 November 1952	SO6563334518; 52°00′29″N 2°30′08″W	1099012	Upload Photo
Huntsham Court and adjoining Gate Piers	Huntsham, Goodrich	Farmhouse	Early 17th century	18 May 1953	SO5624417205; 51°51′06″N 2°38′12″W	1099435	Huntsham Court and adjoining Gate Piers More images
Hyatt Sarnesfield	Norton Canon	Farmhouse	18th century	16 July 1987	SO3801749995; 52°08′41″N 2°54′26″W	1081695	Upload Photo
Junior House of Hereford Cathedral School	1 Castle Street, Hereford	House	18th century	10 June 1952	SO5114939799; 52°03′16″N 2°42′50″W	1196802	Junior House of Hereford Cathedral School More images
Kingsland House	Kingsland	House	Early 18th century	11 June 1959	SO4441061199; 52°14′46″N 2°48′56″W	1081822	Upload Photo
Kingstone Grange	Abbey Dore	Farmhouse	Late 16th century to Early 17th century	19 September 1952	SO4222134446; 52°00′20″N 2°50′35″W	1302393	Upload Photo
Kinnersley Castle	Kinnersley	House	Late 16th century to early 17th century	20 February 1953	SO3461049616; 52°08′27″N 2°57′25″W	1081683	Kinnersley Castle More images
Knapp House	Eardisland	House	17th century	20 February 1953	SO4185058553; 52°13′20″N 2°51′10″W	1081911	Upload Photo
Langstone Court	Llangarron	House	17th century	18 May 1953	SO5342222037; 51°53′42″N 2°40′42″W	1178604	Upload Photo
Leystone Bridge	Marden, County of Herefordshire	Road Bridge	17th century	20 October 1952	SO5180647676; 52°07′31″N 2°42′19″W	1348952	Leystone Bridge More images
Lion Ballroom and Youth Enquiry Service	Leominster	Assembly Rooms	c. 1830	24 July 1954	SO4957859168; 52°13′42″N 2°44′23″W	1119689	Upload Photo
Little Brampton Farmhouse	Little Brampton, Rodd, Nash and Little Brampton	Farmhouse	Mid 16th century	19 August 1953	SO3037561368; 52°14′46″N 3°01′16″W	1067771	Upload Photo
Little Marston	Marston Stannert, Humber	House	17th century	9 April 1952	SO5695655174; 52°11′35″N 2°37′52″W	1276188	Upload Photo
Lower Court	Clifford, Herefordshire	Farmhouse	14th century	16 November 1984	SO2453645584; 52°06′12″N 3°06′11″W	1348895	Upload Photo
Lower Hall	Ledbury	House	17th century	18 September 1953	SO7125637784; 52°02′16″N 2°25′14″W	1082872	Lower Hall
Lower House Farmhouse	Michaelchurch Escley	Farmhouse	16th century or 17th century	12 November 1984	SO3081936287; 52°01′14″N 3°00′35″W	1267209	Upload Photo
Lower Welton Farmhouse	Bishop's Frome	Farmhouse	C14/15	9 April 1952	SO6549747298; 52°07′22″N 2°30′19″W	1176637	Upload Photo
Lucton School	Lucton	School	1708	11 June 1959	SO4380764497; 52°16′33″N 2°49′30″W	1082082	Lucton School More images
Luntley Court	Luntley, Dilwyn	House	Late 17th century	20 February 1953	SO3931755701; 52°11′46″N 2°53′21″W	1301555	Luntley Court More images
Lych Gate	Monnington on Wye, Brobury with Monnington on Wye	Lych Gate	Late 17th century	2 September 1966	SO3734743356; 52°05′06″N 2°54′57″W	1081855	Lych Gate More images
Lych Gate of St James's Church	Cradley	Lych Gate	possibly earlier	9 June 1967	SO7358347101; 52°07′18″N 2°23′14″W	1177095	Upload Photo
Lychgate, Churchyard of Church of St Mary	Kington	Lych Gate	18th century	31 December 1993	SO2922456765; 52°12′16″N 3°02′14″W	1293359	Lychgate, Churchyard of Church of St Mary More images

== See also ==
- Grade I listed buildings in Herefordshire
