= Llancillo =

Village in Herefordshire, England

Coordinates: 51.9311°N 2.93864°W

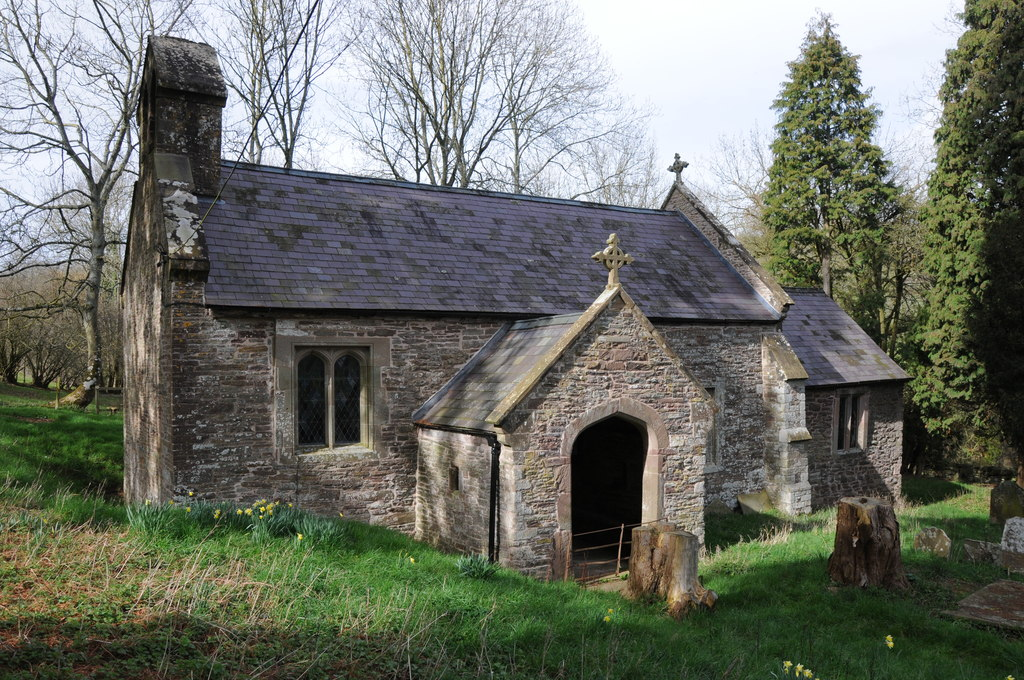
- St Peter's Church

- Location within Herefordshire
- OS grid reference: SO355262
  - London: 125 mi (201 km) ESE
- Unitary authority: Herefordshire
- Ceremonial county: Herefordshire
- Region: West Midlands
- Country: England
- Sovereign state: United Kingdom
- Post town: Hereford
- Postcode district: HR2
- Dialling code: 01981
- Police: West Mercia
- Fire: Hereford and Worcester
- Ambulance: West Midlands
- UK Parliament: Hereford and South Herefordshire

Llancillo is a civil parish in south-west Herefordshire, England, and is approximately 13 miles (20 km) south-west from the city and county town of Hereford. The parish borders Wales at the south in which is the nearest town, Abergavenny, 7 miles (11 km) to the south-southwest. In the parish is the isolated Grade II* listed 11th-century Church of St Peter.

== History ==
Llancillo is not mentioned in Domesday Book. Following the Norman Conquest, Roger de Lacy, son to Walter de Lacy, held the parishes of Rowlestone and Llancillo from Henry de Ferrers, the tenant-in-chief to king William I. Llancillo was part of Ewyas Lacy hundred, and was held under Roger de Lacy, and through him in turn by the Normans William and Osbern who constructed the castle at Llancillo.

'Llan' in this context means variously church, land, building or enclosure, or those attributes applied to a religious building or estate, and is an indication here of a pre-Norman church. 'Cillo' could be a corruption of an earlier saint's name, perhaps St Sulfyw (Sylvius). Llancillo in c.1150 was written as Lann Sulbiu, or Lannsuluui, or Ecclesia Sancti Sulbiu (Church of St Sulbiu); in 1182, Lantelio; in 1296, Lansilio, in 1323, Lanciliou; in 1399, Lancelio; in 1770, Lansyllo or Llancillo; in 1733 as Llansilo; in 1754, Lansillo; and in 1840 as Llannsillo or Llancillo.

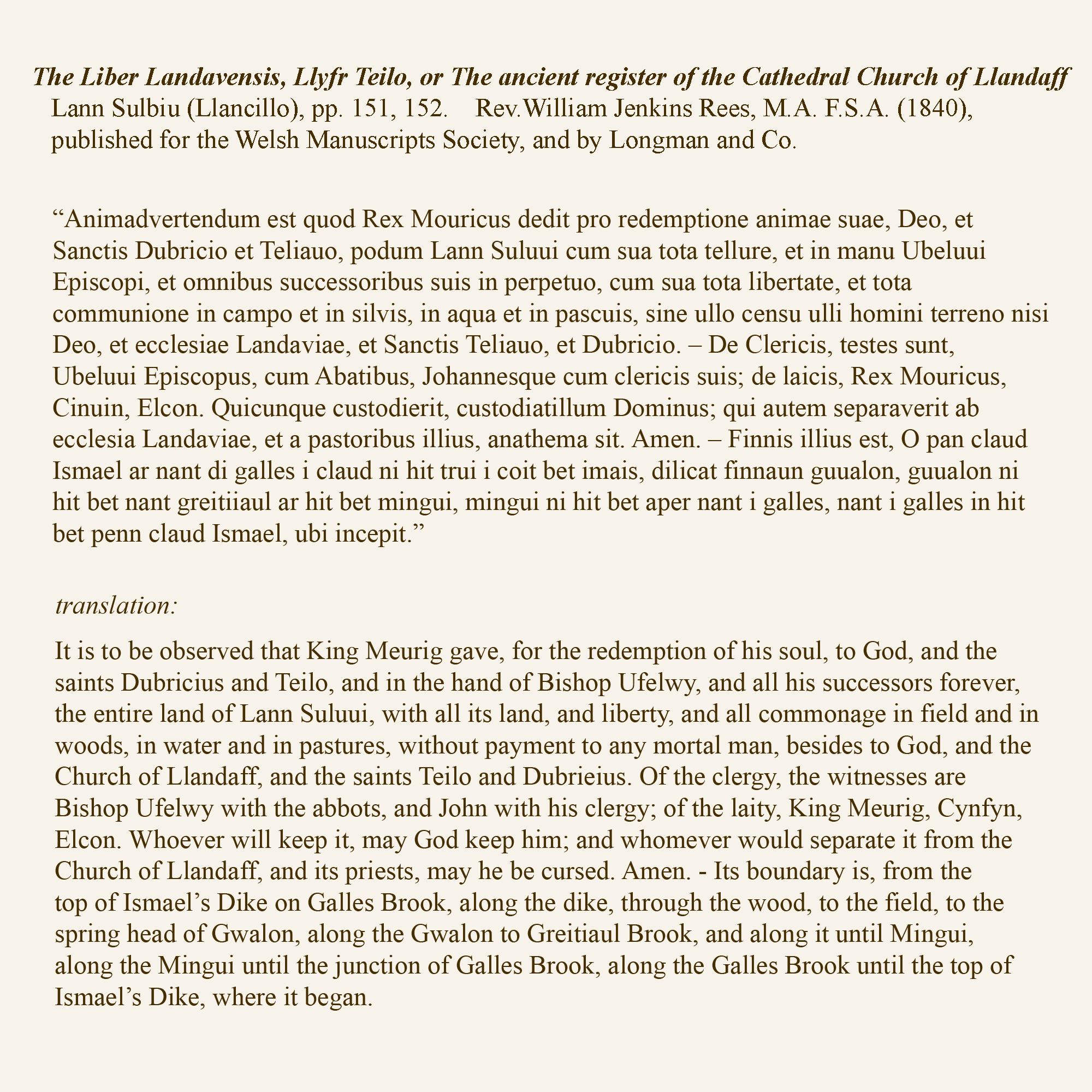
Llancillo in Liber Landavensis, or the Book of Llandaff

In the 1840 transcription and translation of the 12th-century Liber Landavensis... (Book of Llandaff), the sections on Llancillo state that the Early Middle Ages' king Meurig, who was patron for the Celtic Llandaff Cathedral, today in Cardiff, gave Llancillo to the cathedral and its bishop and saint Ufelwy, "for the redemption of his soul, to God, and the saints Dubricius and Teilo". St Dubricius is interred and St Telio's relics held at Llandaff. Llancillo was given in perpetuity to Llandaff, its land extent laid out in text which bounded this through a description of watercourses.

In the first half of the 17th century was recorded an ironworking forge at Llancillo (grid reference SO37682528), using power from a tributary of the River Monnow at the south of the parish, including a leat, "weirs, ponds, dams, watercourses, houses and buildings". An early lease-out dates to 1637, under the Scudamore family, who then owned the forge, outright or in partnership, until at least 1778. By 1677 the forge was producing 150 tons of wrought iron a year; it obtained pig iron from Llanelly and sold the resulting refined wrought iron in Monmouth. In 1810 it is noted as a charcoal forge, and is drawn on Ordnance Survey and tithe maps from 1814, to 1839 when it is shown as disused. Slag and clinker waste is still evident on the site.

In the 19th and 20th century, Llancillo is described in directories as a small parish and village on the river Monnow, bordering Monmouthshire, 4 miles (6 km) south-southwest from the village of Abbey Dore, 8 miles (13 km) north-east from Abergavenny, and 2 miles (3 km) south-west from Pontrilas railway station on the Newport, Abergavenny and Hereford Railway which later, after amalgamation, became a branch of the Great Western Railway. The parish was in the Webtree hundred before 1860, and after, that of Ewias Lacy (Ewyas Lacy), and in the rural deanery of Weobley and later, in the 20th century, the rural deanery of Abbey Dore, both in the diocese and archdeaconry of Hereford. Llancillo was in the Abbey Dore Union—poor relief and joint parish workhouse provision set up under the Poor Law Amendment Act 1834—and the petty sessional division and county court district of Hereford. The parish was part of the polling district of Longtown, but by 1890 was part of the Pontrilas and Orcop polling district.

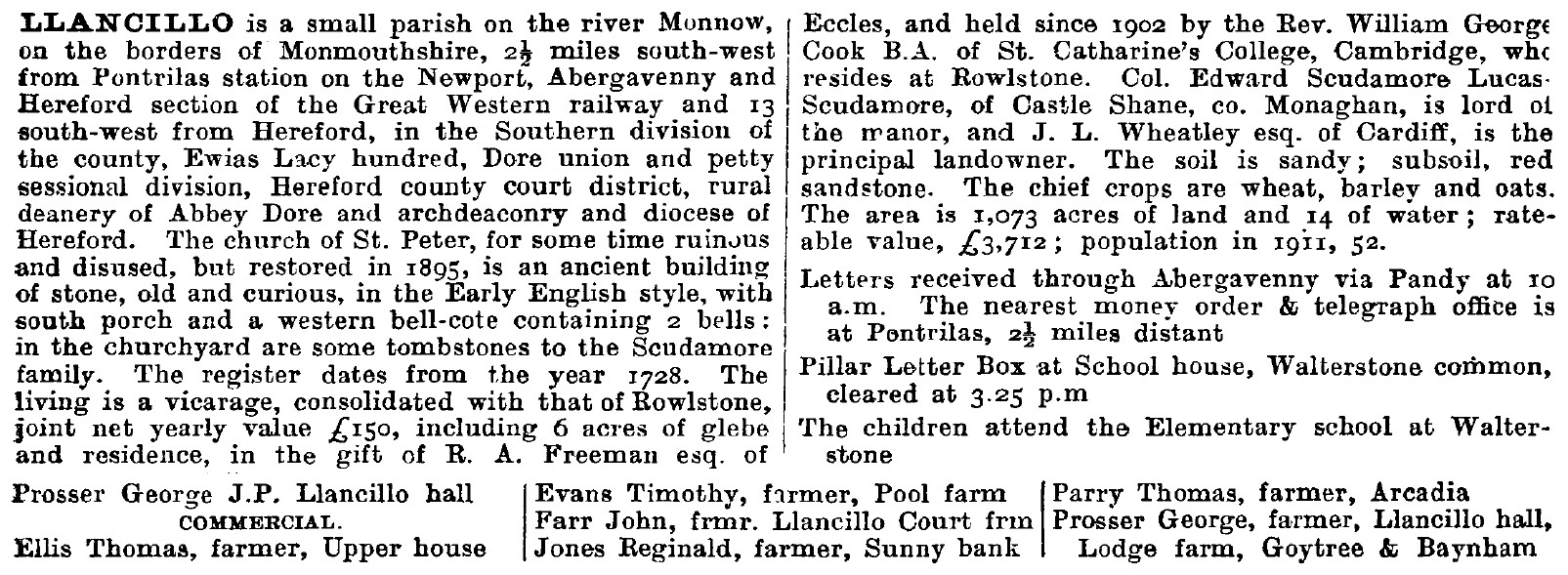
Llancillo in Kelly's Directory of Herefordshire, 1913

The parish church of St Peter is described before 1870 as "a very old stone building" and "old, plain, and good", which included a nave, chancel, south porch, and a small bellcote at the west with one bell. By 1876 it was in a bad state of repair and unfit for divine service, and nine years later still "dilapidated and disused". There was no road to the church, the congregation attending services at Rowlestone and in 1890, as the parish was almost without population, it was not intended to restore it. However, the church was restored in 1895 and was described as "old and curious, in the Early English style", and now having two bells. In the churchyard were reported tombstones to the Scudamore family. The parish register dates to 1728. The parish living was consolidated with that of the vicarage of Rowl[e]ston, although during parts of the 1860s and 1870s being a perpetual curacy (an office supported by stipend rather than tithes or glebe). While a vicarage, the incumbent was supported by 6 acres (2.4 hectares) of glebe—an area of land used to support the parish church and priest—and a residence, and variously at times advowson by patrons from Eccles, Carlisle and Southampton.

Lords of the manor in the 19th century were members of the Scudamore family whose seat was Kentchurch Court, 2 miles (3 km) to the east, who were parish chief landowners alongside variously the Price family of Llancillo Hall and the Scottish Union and National Insurance Company of London. Lord of the manor between the 1870s and the First World War was Edward Lucas-Scudamore ((1853–1917), later Colonel in the Hereford Regiment of Militia and JP, of the Castle Shane Estate, County Monaghan, and Cap House at Pontrilas. Parish land was of 1,086 acres (439 hectares) including 14 acres (5.7 hectares) of water, and is sandy over a subsoil of red sandstone on which was grown wheat, barley roots and oats. Population in 1851 was 70; in 1861, 74; in 1871, 88 (with 14 inhabited houses); 1881, 62 (with 11 families or separate occupiers); 1891, 60; 1901, 66; and 1911, 52. In the last half of the 19th century there were typically six or seven farmers listed in directories, and at least one farm bailiff. The parish clerk was occasionally mentioned as resident after 1856, while in 1890, there was listed an assistant overseer for the parish who lived at the Carpenter's Arms in Abergavenny. Letters were delivered and received through the post town Abergavenny via Pandy, and from the 1880s the nearest money order and telegraph office was at Pontrilas. Up to 1876 there was no school in the parish, but a school board had been formed in 1875 for the united district of Rowlstone, Walterstone, and Llancillo. By 1885 the school board was in place and children attended the new board school at Walterstone. By 1905 the school was now an elementary school.

== Geography ==
Llancillo parish boundary is of triangular footprint, at its greatest distance 1.5 miles (2 km) north to south, 1.7 miles (3 km) east to west, and covers an area of approximately 1,087 acres (440 hectares). Adjacent Herefordshire parishes are Walterstone at the west, Longtown at the north-west, and Rowlestone at the north, with the Monmouthshire community of Grosmont at the south. The parish is rural, of six farm complexes, fields, managed woodland and coppices, watercourses, ponds, and residential properties. Flowing west to east at the south of the parish is the River Monnow tributary to the River Wye, this 12 miles (19 km) to the south-east at Monmouth. The Morrow at its west forms the border with Monmouthshire. From the north-west of the parish flows tributaries to a stream with woodland margins, which passes Llancillo Church and Llancillo Court Farm, and flows to the south-east of the parish to join the River Morrow. There is a group of unnumbered minor roads at the north, and another at the south; no road connects the north of the parish to its south. A north-east to south-west through road at the north runs from the village of Rowlestone towards Pandy in Monmouthshire, these both outside the parish. From the A465 Abergavenny to Hereford road at the southern edge of the parish, a road runs north; it crosses the River Morrow by a one lane road bridge, and immediately splits to two circuitous routes: one to Llancillo Court Farm and Llancillo Church nearly 1 mile (2 km) north-east, the other to Llancillo Hall Farm 1,300 yards (1,200 m) north-west. These roads bridge the Welsh Marches railway line which runs almost entirely through the south of the parish. All other routes are bridleways, farm tracks, property entrances and footpaths.

Running east to west through the parish is part of the Golden Valley Pilgrim Way, which and passes St Peter's Church. The Golden Valley Pilgrim Way is a 59 miles (95 km) circuitous footpath and road route through western Herefordshire, beginning and ending at Hereford Cathedral. St Peter's Church is also on the route of the 218 miles (351 km) Chester to Cardiff Marches Way footpath.

== Governance ==
Llancillo is represented in the lowest tier of UK governance by the thirteen-member, four-parish Ewyas Harold Group Parish Council, which also represents the parishes of Dulas, Ewyas Harold, and Rowlestone. As Herefordshire is a unitary authority—no district council between parish and county councils—the parish sends councilors representing the Golden Valley South Ward of fifteen parishes with a population of 3,422, to Herefordshire County Council, and is part of the Southern Area Meeting Group of the Herefordshire four-parts Parish Council Area Meeting Groups. Llancillo is represented in the UK parliament as part of the Hereford and South Herefordshire constituency, held by the Conservative Party since 2010 by Jesse Norman.

Until Brexit, on 31 January 2019, the parish was represented in the European Parliament as part of the West Midlands constituency.

== Community ==
There are no bus routes that pass through the parish, however, at the southern border on the A465 road are stops on the Hereford to Abergavenny route operated by Stagecoach South Wales. The closest rail connections are on the Welsh Marches line, at Abergavenny railway station 8 miles (13 km) to the south, and Hereford railway station 14 miles (23 km) to the north-east.

The nearest National Health Service major hospital is Hereford County Hospital, 12 miles (19 km) miles north-west at Hereford, part of the Wye Valley NHS Trust. At Abergavenny in Monmouthshire, 7 miles (11 km) to the south-west, is the Nevill Hall Hospital, a district general hospital under the Aneurin Bevan University Health Board. The nearest National Health Service doctor surgery is Golden Valley Practice at Ewyas Harold, 2 miles (3 km) north-west.

The nearest Herefordshire catchment area primary schools are both 2 miles (3 km) distant: Ewyas Harold Primary School north-east at Ewyas Harold, and Longtown Community Primary School north at Longtown. The nearest secondary school is Kingstone High School 7 miles (11 km) north-east at Kingstone. In latest Ofsted inspections Ewyas Harold Primary was rated Grade 2 'Good' (2018); Longtown Community Primary Grade 2 'Good' (2018); and Kingstone High School Grade 2 'Good' (2019).

For religion Llancillo falls under the Rowlestone & Llancillo ecclesiastical parish in the Abbeydore Deanery of the Hereford Archdeaconry in the Diocese of Hereford.

== Landmarks ==
There are five Grade II and one Grade II* listed buildings in Llancillo, including a farmhouse, a house, two barns, a church and a churchyard cross.

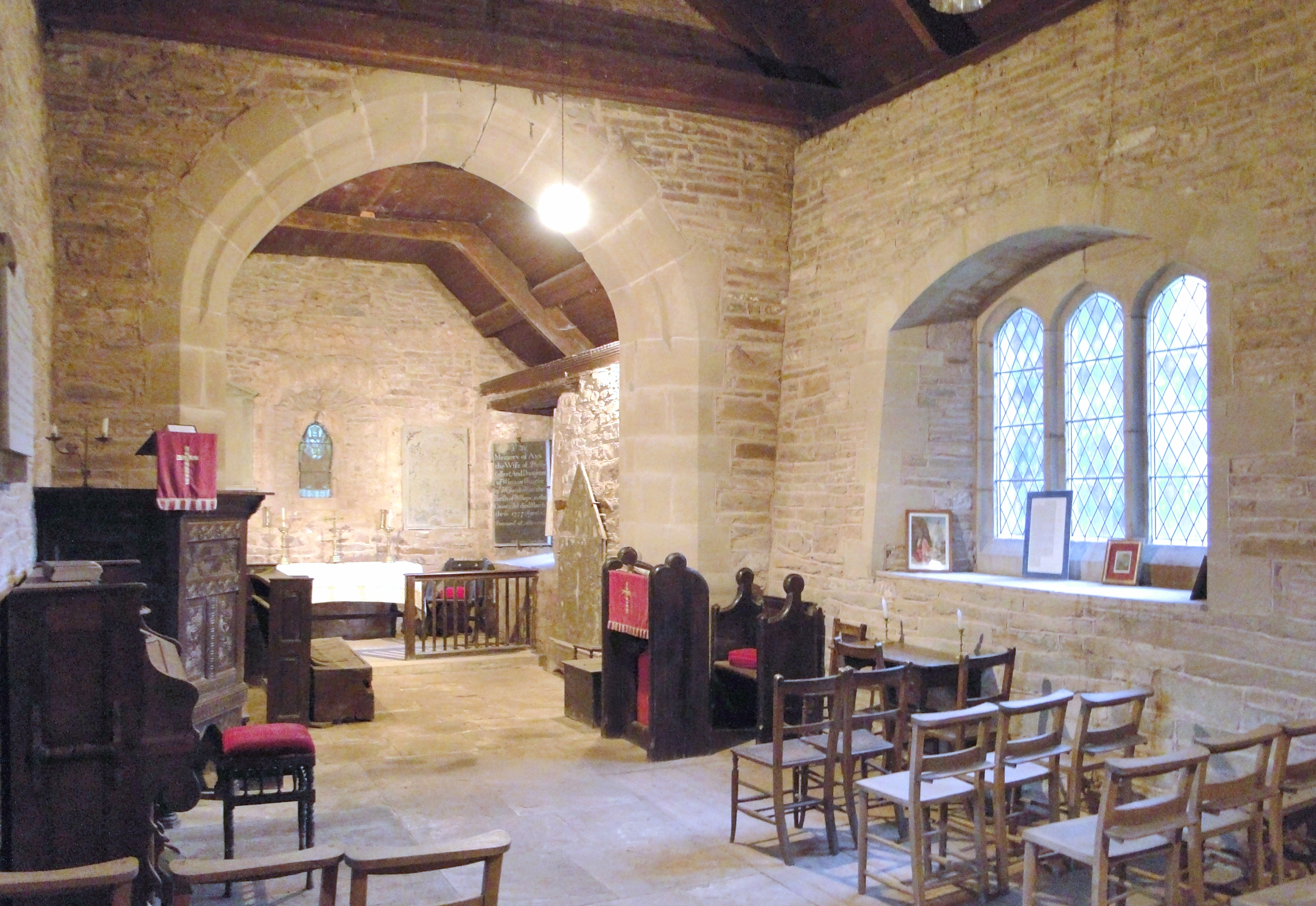
St Peter's nave and chancel

The Grade II* listed church of St Peter (at grid reference SO3661525569), of nave, chancel and south porch, dates to the late 11th or 12th century, with 13th century alterations. The church was "extensively" restored in 1895 after a period of 19th-century disuse and disrepair. In the 17th century various further additions and alterations were added to the nave including windows and a door with arched lintel, and a gabled 17th-century stone south porch. The nave measures 37 feet 0 inches by 15 feet 0 inches (1,128 cm × 457 cm), and the chancel 14 feet 6 inches by 11 feet 3 inches (442 cm × 343 cm). Construction is of sandstone rubble course-working with tufa limestone edge dressings, window mullions and wall capping. The nave roofline steps down to that of the chancel. The slate roof is 20th-century over a 17-century structure. The nave, buttressed at the east end, has at its west a gabled bell cote containing two bells, one probably dating to the 17th century, the other 19th. There are two 19th-century square-headed mullioned windows of the same style at the south of the nave: one of two lights to the west and one of three lights to the east. The chancel Norman east window is a round-headed single light lancet, similarly repeated in the north wall, its stained glass by William Pearce of Birmingham or Jones and Willis, dedicated to Joseph Larke Wheatley (1846–1932), who lived at Llancillo Hall and was a town clerk of Cardiff from 1879 to 1919. The chancel roof wooden board ceiling is supported by two collar beam trusses, either 17th century or later, whereas the nave roof, with eight collar beams of similar construction, but with ceiling boarding of "modern" origin. The interior contains a part-octagonal pulpit of partly arabesque ornamented panelled oak at the north-east of the nave, dated by inscription to 1632, and 17th-century quire stalls which are a mixture of early to mid-17th-century pannelling and 18th-century end returns. The octagonal font, with a curved sided bowl, is 13th century. In the chancel is a "primitive" 13th-century dug-out wooden chest with lid strap hinges and an iron lock-plate.

Within the churchyard, south-east of the porch, are two grave monuments to the Scudamore family. One is principally to James Scudamore (1690) and Thomas Scudamore (1720); the other, a stone slab, to Elizabeth, the wife to Thomas Scudamore (1653), and to John Scudamore (1695), and Blanch, the wife to James Price (1714). At the front of the south porch is a listed 19th-century churchyard preaching cross, set on a square three-step base dating to the 14th century. Also within the churchyard (at grid reference SO3661925548), is an ancient yew tree, on a mound beside a boundary wall, one of a grouping of yews. It has been described as "a very old yew on an embanked mound against the boundary wall. It has a considerable circumference, suggesting a very great age - a pre-Norman origin perhaps." The trees girth at the base in 2019 was 19 feet 2.0 inches (584.2 cm) diameter. The church is looked after by the Herefordshire Historic Churches Trust and the Friends of Friendless Churches.

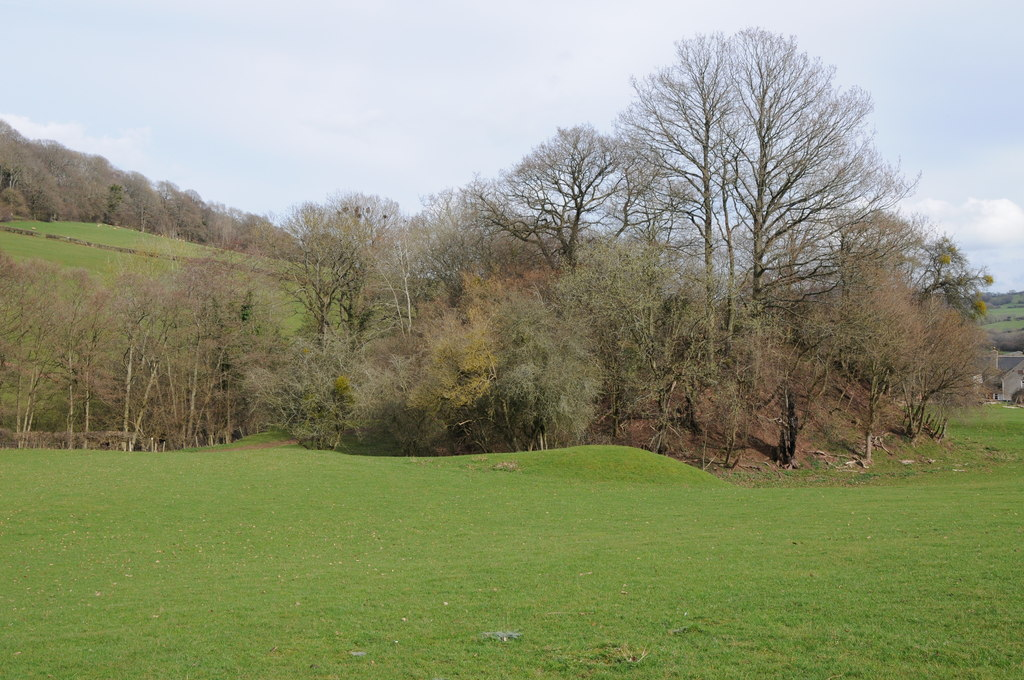
Llancillo Castle motte remains

Within sight of the churchyard, and 90 yards (80 m) to the east (at grid reference SO3671025540), is a scheduled mound earthwork of a former motte of a probable late 11th-century motte-and-bailey castle, circular of 43 yards (40 m) in diameter at the base, and 16.5 yards (15 m) at the top at a height of 26 feet (8 m). On the motte are remains of rubble walling which might be evidence of a fortified tower, while it is surrounded partially by a ditch and outer rampart.

At 650 yards (600 m) south-west of the church is Llancillo Hall (at grid reference SO3619625164), a farmhouse which possibly dates to the late 15th or early 16th century, with alterations in the 17th and 19th centuries. It is constructed in L-plan of sandstone rubble course-work, with the north-west wing probable dating to the 17th-century. Its Welsh slate roofs have gable-end chimney stacks. Of two storeys, its south-east face, sitting on a raised garden terrace, is of five bays, with two bays to the south-west of the entrance door of sash windows, and two bays of smaller csements to the north-east.

At the extreme south of the parish is the listed Little Goytre, alternatively Ivy House, (at grid reference SO3568424400), which overlooks the Welsh Marches railway line at the north and is on the banks of the River Monnow at the south. It is a two-storey house dating to the 17th century with alterations in the 18th and 20th century. It is of rectangular footprint with a Welsh slate gabled roof with end chimney stacks. The interior includes ground-floor rooms with exposed chamfered beams and joists, two original doorways and "two original doorways with four-centred heads and remains of old panelling." At 65 yards (60 m) north from Little Goytre is a listed timber framed and part weatherboarded barn (grid reference SO3567524465), dating probably to the 17th century and standing on a rubble stone course-work plinth, with a threshing floor in the centre of its three bays.

At about 1 mile (1.6 km) north-west from the church at the north of the parish and just south-east from Upper House farmhouse, north off the Rowlestone to Pandy minor road (at grid reference SO3542926456), is a listed 1629-dated timber framed barn, the date carved into a timber-brace of the truss roof beams. The north to south orientated tiled roof barn sits on a sandstone plinth and is part weatherboard cladded, and of four bays with a central threshing floor.
