= Ewyas Lacy =

Hundred in southwest Herefordshire

Coordinates: 52.005°N 3.001°W

Ewyas Lacy was an ancient hundred in south-west Herefordshire. It was part of the ancient Welsh region of Ewyas claimed by the de Lacy family following the Norman Conquest. It equated to the modern civil parishes of Craswall, Cusop, Llancillo, Llanveynoe, Longtown (with Clodock), Michaelchurch Escley, Newton, Rowlestone, St Margarets, and Walterstone.

Ewyas Lacy ceased to be used as an administrative entity with the passing of the Local Government Act 1888. The final residual copyholds were converted to freeholds in the Law of Property Act 1922.
