= Leinthall Starkes =

Village in Herefordshire, England

Coordinates: 52.323°N 2.829°W

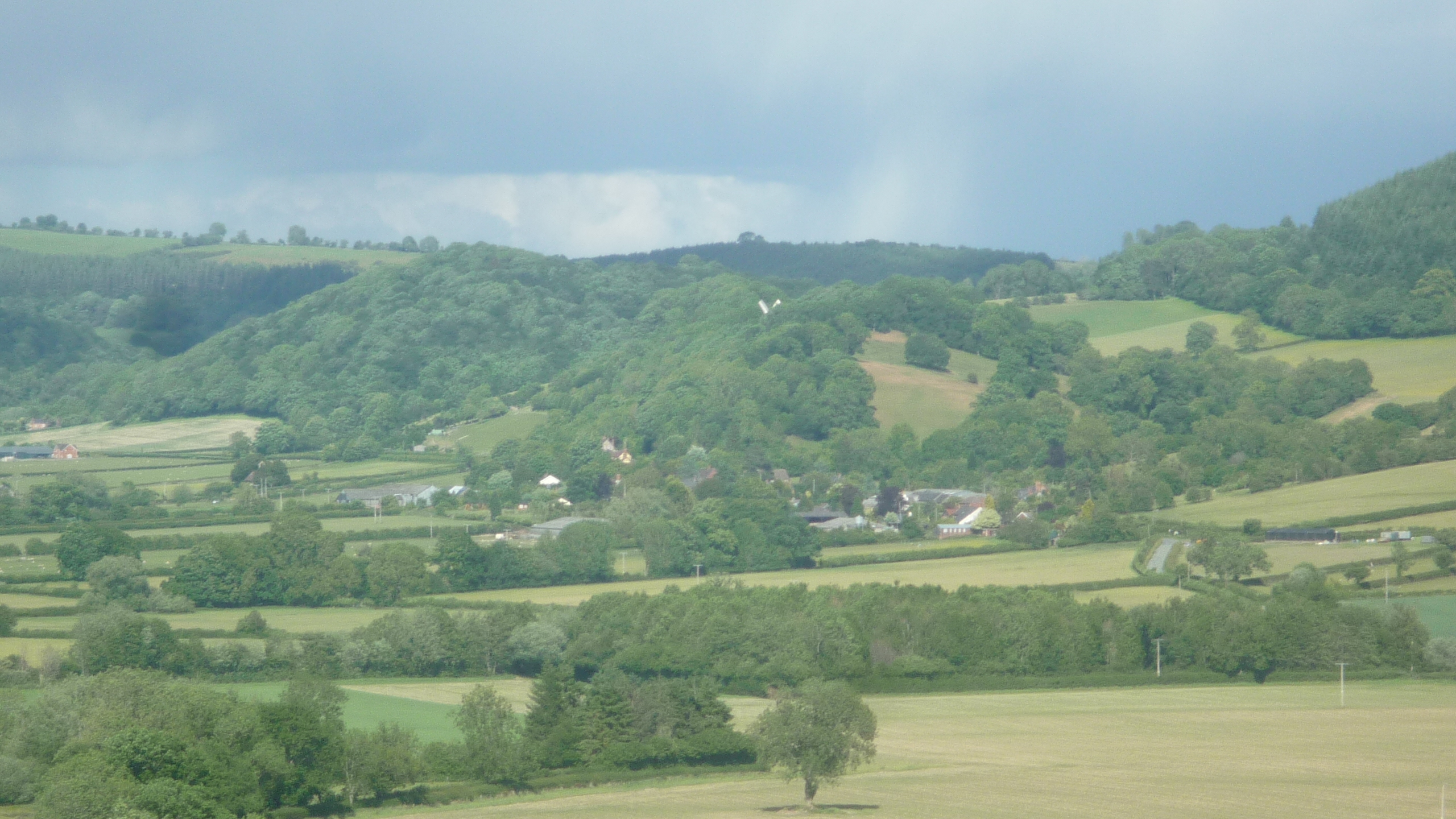
- View

- Location within Herefordshire
- Population: 168 (2011)
- OS grid reference: SO436697
- Civil parish: Leinthall Starkes
- Unitary authority: Herefordshire
- Ceremonial county: Herefordshire
- Region: West Midlands
- Country: England
- Sovereign state: United Kingdom
- Post town: LUDLOW
- Postcode district: SY8
- Police: West Mercia
- Fire: Hereford and Worcester
- Ambulance: West Midlands
- UK Parliament: North Herefordshire

Leinthall Starkes is a small village and civil parish in north-western Herefordshire, England. It is about 7 miles south-west of Ludlow, and near the larger village of Wigmore. The road between the two runs through the village.

Leinthall Earls is situated to the south of the village.

== History ==
The village takes its name from the medieval landowner, Roger Lenethale. The parish church of St Mary Magdalene was originally the chapel to the manor house, and is located in a field, half a mile to the east of the main village street. It dates back to the 13th century, and was restored in 1497 and 1876.

== Places of interest ==
In a field on the western side of the village, just off the road to Wigmore, there is an ROC post. It was opened in May 1961 and closed in October 1968.
