= Gatley Park =

Country house and park in Leinthall Earls, Herefordshire, England

Coordinates: 52.3115°N 2.8099°W

Gatley Park is an English 17th-century park and country house lying near Leinthall Earls, Herefordshire. Both the park and the house are separately listed, the park as Grade II and the house as a Grade II* listed building.

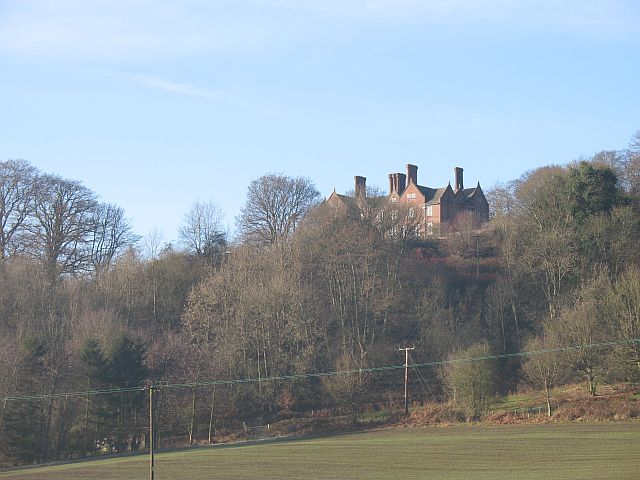
Gatley Park house

== Gatley Park house ==
The house was originally built for high court judge Sir Sampson Eure in the 1630s, but extended and restored between 1894 and 1907. It is built in brick with two storeys and an attic to a square plan later extended by attached wings. The roofs are of stone tiles with a central chimney stack of nine octagonal brick shafts,

== Gatley Park ==
The park consists of a strip of land on the south side of a long ridge which slopes downwards from north to south into a small valley. The house stands in the centre of the strip at the foot of the ridge and is surrounded by gardens. The rest of the estate comprises ancient woodland and grassland with specimen trees.

In the 1960s a domed three-storey tower designed by Raymond Erith was built just outside the park as a folly and dower house. The interior was designed by John Beresford Fowler.

== History ==
Gatley Park and the nearby manor of Leinthall Starkes once belonged to the Earl of March, reverting to the Crown on the accession of Edward IV. They were granted in the reign of Elizabeth I to merchant William Horne from whom they passed to the Croft family.

The Gatley estate was bought in 1632 from Sir William Croft by Sir Sampson Eure, who built the present house. On his death in 1659 with no surviving children the property was left to his widow, who died in 1673. It was acquired in 1679 by Philip Dunne and has descended in the Dunne family ever since.

The current owner is Philip Dunne, a former MP for Ludlow.
