= John Abel (carpenter) =

English carpenter and mason

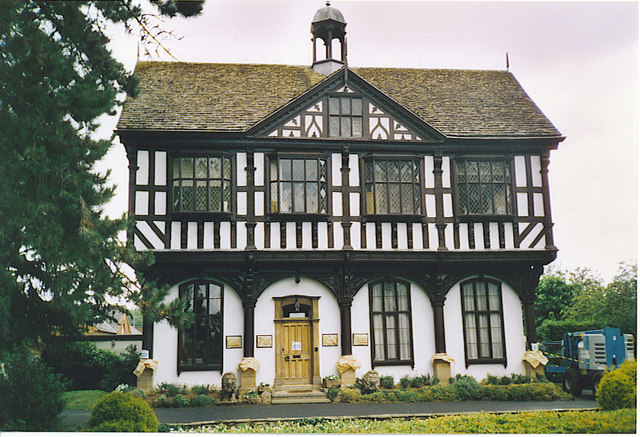
- The Grange at Leominster, designed and built by John Abel
- Born: 1578/79; Sarnesfield, Herefordshire, England
- Died: 1675
- Occupation: Carpenter

John Abel (1578/79 – January 1675) was an English carpenter and mason, granted the title of 'King's Carpenter', who was responsible for several notable structures in the ornamented Half-timbered construction typical of the West Midlands.

John Abel was born in Sarnesfield, Herefordshire. He was a Catholic recusant, along with his wife Johanna. In 1618 he was brought before a church court to answer for his recusancy and also for his secret marriage to Johanna. The case against him was eventually dismissed, but his name can be found on a list of Catholic recusants from 1640.

Abel married twice, but there is no record of his second wife except on his table tomb in Sarnesfield. He had one son, named John, who later became churchwarden of Sarnesfield.

== Work ==
Very little is known about Abel's work, and some local traditions attribute buildings to him that are impossible in terms of their date. Abel's first known commission was in 1625 when he was contracted to build Lady Hawkins' grammar school in Kington. The contract was to fit into the terms of the will of Lady Margaret Hawkins. It is known that Abel supplied all the materials and that he was paid £240. The house design differs significantly from his later work in that it was built partially of stone. The stone window and ceiling beams of the house still survive, though the rest of the building was demolished.

In March 1633, it is known that Abel was contracted again, this time by John, 1st Viscount Scudamore, to renovate Abbey Dore Church, a former Cistercian monastery in Herefordshire. The work was completed in March 1634, in time for the reconsecration of the building. Though there have been some minor alterations made to his work, the church remains the most intact example of Abel's work available today as well as one of the best preserved examples of Laudian architecture.

There is no record of Abel's work for another eighteen years, until in 1652, he was contracted to create a new building for which he was paid £30. 'The modell of ye New Building' still exists and is currently kept at Tyberton Court, where the work was originally done.

Abel is also known to have built market houses in Brecnoc (1624), Kington and Lemster (1634). The Lemster (now Leominster) market house originally stood in Broad Street, but was rebuilt by John Arkwright who bought the building for £95. He offered the building to the council if they would re-erect it but they refused. He moved the building himself and rebuilt it in 1856. It remained as a private house until the 1930s, was subsequently used as council offices, and following extension work it reopened as a visitor attraction, cafe, community space, wedding venue and offices. It is widely regarded as one of Abel's finest works and is built in the Renaissance tradition. It is now known as Grange Court. In 2001, a campaign was started to raise money to restore the building to its original state. The building is Grade II listed.

The Kington market hall was demolished in 1820 and no record of its appearance remains.

All of Abel's market houses are known to have been built in timber and were known to contain lengthy religious inscriptions in their walls, some borrowing from both St Jerome and Cato the Elder. Some of these inscriptions can also be found on his work at Dore Abbey. In spite of the intricacies of his work, Abel's style has still been described as 'restrained'.

Based on the consistency of Abel's style, scholars tentatively attribute the restoration of Vowchurch in 1613 and Monnington Court on the Wye to him.

=== Military work ===
In 1645, during the middle of the civil war, Abel was in Hereford when the Scots besieged it. With Charles I and his soldiers inside the city walls, mills were important to ensure the food supply lasted, and powder mills to make gunpowder. The Roundheads had burnt down the mills the town had previously owned. However, Abel was able to design and build another one. Records differ but because of this the King granted Abel the title of either Master Carpenter or the King's Carpenter.

Sir Barnabus Scudamore went further in his estimation of Abel, saying that he was the only man in England who was able to create powder mills.

Abel is also known to have created a wooden tank called the Sow which Scudmore deployed against the parliamentary garrison at Canon Frome in October 1645. Unfortunately the device was never used in combat as it was surprised by Parliamentarian raiders.

== Myths ==
Abel is frequently connected to the Hereford Market Hall (which was partially demolished in 1862), though historical evidence suggests that the building was not created by him. In 2008, English Heritage's Inspector of Historic Buildings, Nick Molyneux, was noted as saying that the style of the architecture was different from Abel's.

Though historical records clearly show otherwise, legend states that Abel found, felled and used all the timber used in Dore Abbey Church in less than five months.

In spite of a lack of evidence that he had a hand in the architecture, John Abel was associated with buildings in: Weobley, Abbey Dore, Tyberton, Stretford, Orleton, Pembridge, Ross-on-Wye, Ledbury and Hereford.

== Death ==
Abel died in January 1675 and was buried at Sarnesfield on 31 January. He was 97 years old. He wrote his own epitaph and built his own tomb. His tombstone read:

"This craggy Stone covering is for an Architector's Bed

That lofty Buildings raised high, yet now lyes low His Head

His line and Rule, So Death concludes, are locked up in Store

Build they that [who] list, or they that wist, for He can Build no More

His House of Clay could Hold no Longer

May Heavens joy frame (build) Him a Stronger

Vive ut vivas in vitam aeternam."

— John Abel

In the Victorian era, the tomb was restored by the National Society for Preserving the Memorials of the Dead and the epitaph was slightly altered. In 2001 a campaign was started to restore Abel's tomb.
