= Yatton, east Herefordshire =

Village in Herefordshire, England

Coordinates: 51.972°N 2.540°W

Yatton
- All Saints' Church, Yatton

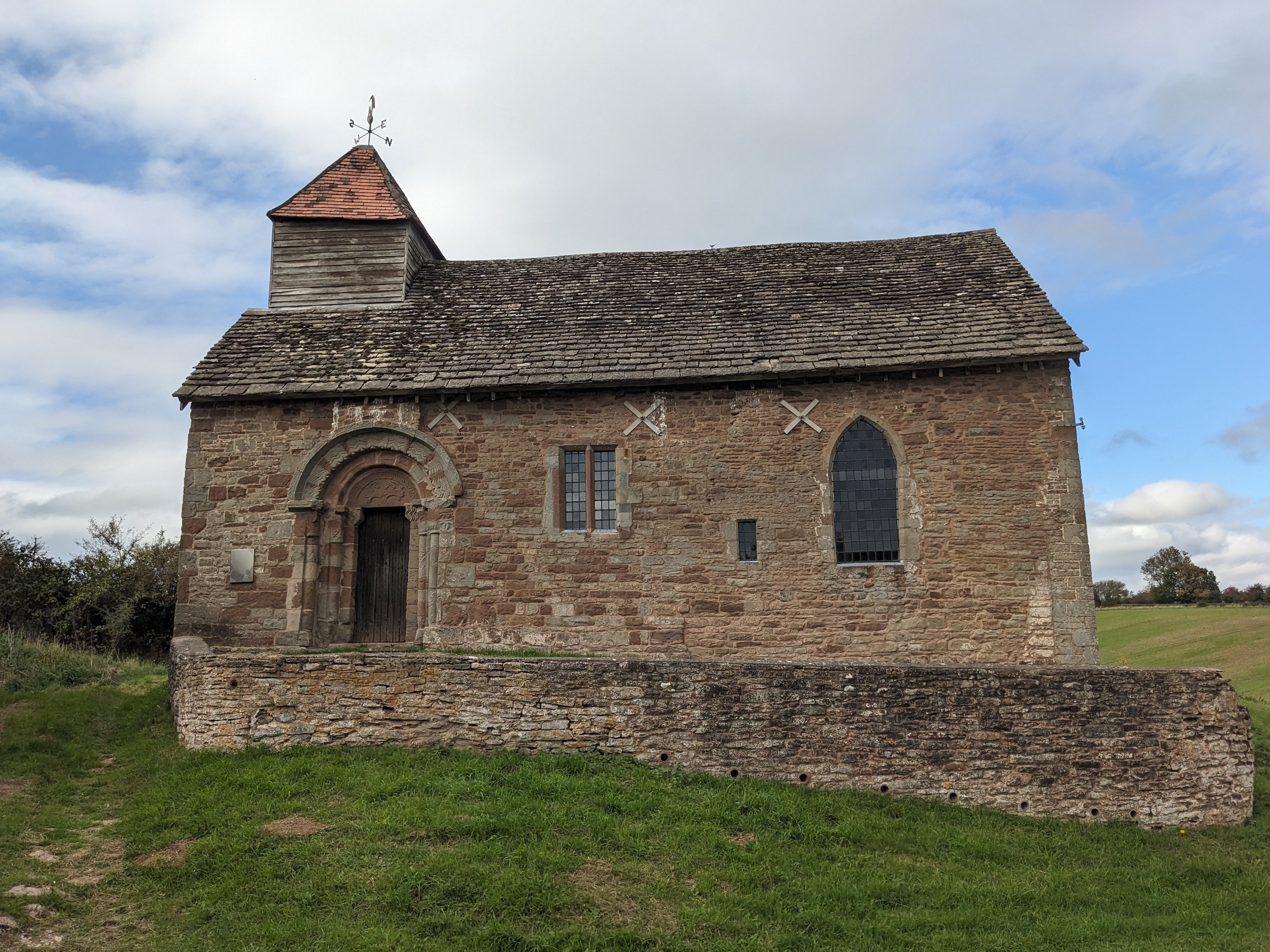
- Yatton Chapel

- Location within Herefordshire
- Population: 208 (2011 Census)
- Unitary authority: Herefordshire
- Shire county: Herefordshire
- Region: West Midlands
- Country: England
- Sovereign state: United Kingdom
- Post town: Ross-on-Wye
- Postcode district: HR9
- Police: West Mercia
- Fire: Hereford and Worcester
- Ambulance: West Midlands
- UK Parliament: Hereford and South Herefordshire

Yatton is a small hamlet and parish in south-east Herefordshire, England. Yatton is situated on Perrystone Hill, between Ross-on-Wye and Much Marcle. The population of the civil parish at the 2011 census was 208. In civil matters it forms part of How Caple, Sollers Hope and Yatton group parish council.

All Saints' Church is a Victorian church building of 1841 and an active Church of England parish church. It is Grade II listed. Ecclesiastically Yatton is a part of Much Marcle with Yatton in the Diocese of Hereford and was formerly a chapelry/township of Much Marcle.

Yatton Chapel is a redundant Anglican church in the care of the Churches Conservation Trust. It is recorded in the National Heritage List for England as a designated Grade II* listed building. The chapel stands at the end of a winding track adjacent to Chapel Farmhouse.

Other buildings of historic interest in Yatton include:
Chapel Farmhouse, a Grade II-listed farmhouse, dating from the late 16th or early 17th century.
Deans Place, a Grade II-listed farmhouse, substantially a late-16th- or early-17th-century timber-framed farmhouse.
Fiddlers Bank, a Grade II-listed house, late-Tudor/early-Stuart timber-framed farmhouse that's been added to over the centuries but still retains a lot of its original close-studded frame.
Welsh Court, a Grade II-listed early-to-mid-19th-century brick farmhouse.
Westnorsend Farmhouse, a Grade II-listed 16th-century timber-framed farmhouse.
