= Yatton Chapel =

Coordinates: 51.9708°N 2.5444°W

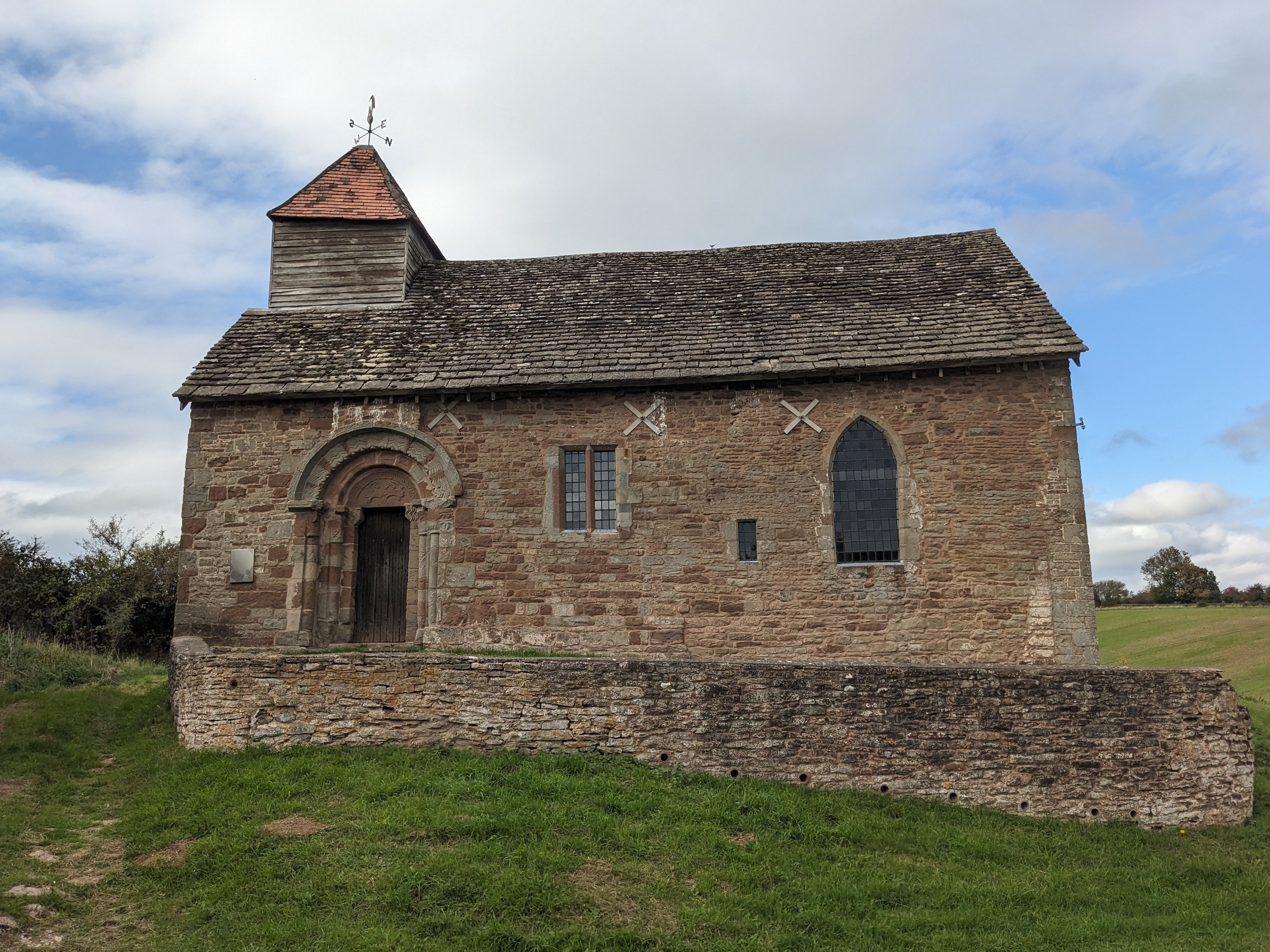
- Yatton Chapel in 2025

- Location in Herefordshire
- Location: Yatton, Herefordshire
- Country: England
- Denomination: Anglican
- Website: Churches Conservation Trust

Architecture
- Functional status: Redundant
- Heritage designation: Grade II*
- Designated: 25 February 1966
- Architectural type: Church
- Style: Norman
- Groundbreaking: 12th century

Specifications
- Materials: Sandstone, stone slate roof

Yatton Chapel is a redundant Anglican church in Yatton, south-east Herefordshire, England. It is recorded in the National Heritage List for England as a designated Grade II* listed building, and is under the care of the Churches Conservation Trust. It stands at the end of a winding track adjacent to Chapel Farmhouse.

== History ==
The chapel was built in the 12th century, and was originally a parish church. Alterations were made to it during the 13th century. The north wall was rebuilt in the 16th or 17th century. In about 1600 the bellcote was added. The east end of the chancel was rebuilt in 1704, reusing a 13th-century window. It closed as a parish church in 1841 when a new church was built on a different site. Furnishings (altar, altar rail, chancel screen) were transferred to the new All Saints' Church. The chapel was restored during the 1970s by the Redundant Churches Commission (now the Churches Conservation Trust). It was declared redundant on 15 March 1971, and was vested in the Churches Conservation Trust on 20 September 1974.

== Architecture ==
Yatton Chapel is constructed in sandstone rubble with ashlar dressings, and has a stone slate roof. Its plan is simple, consisting of a nave and chancel, and a bellcote at the west end. The bellcote is weatherboarded and has a pyramidal roof. The south doorway is Norman in style. It has a semicircular arched head decorated with chevrons, and a tympanum carved with a foliar design. To the right of the doorway are a double square-headed window, a small single-light square-headed window, and a larger single-light window with a pointed arch. In the east wall are two single-light round-headed windows, one above the other. At the west end is a two-light window with trefoil heads. Inside the church are two fonts. The original font, probably from the 12th century, is a damaged plain cylindrical bowl. The other font, dating from the 12th century, also has a plain cylindrical bowl and was moved here when the parish church of St Mary Magdalene in Brobury ceased to be used for worship.

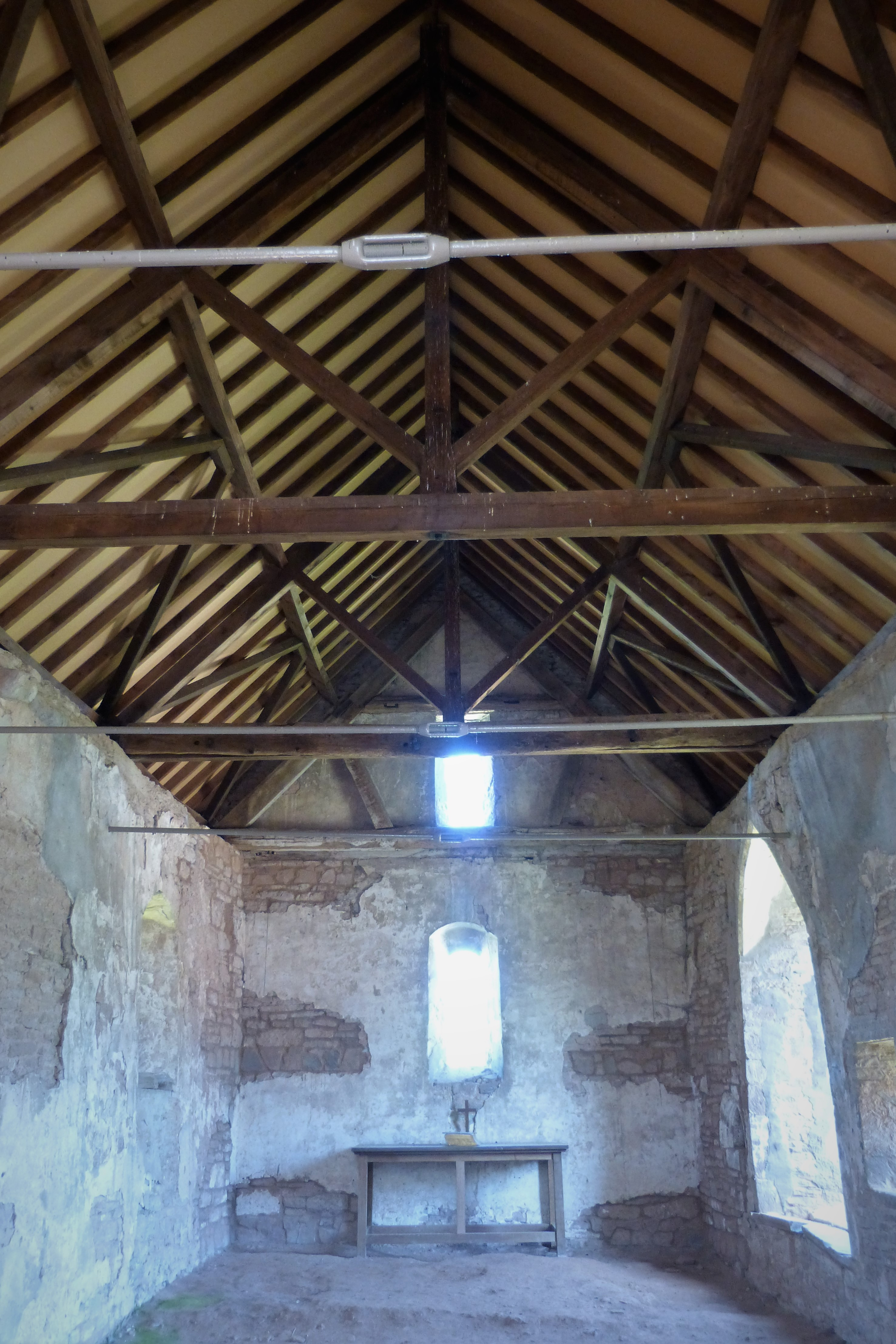
Interior including reinforcement

The two fonts

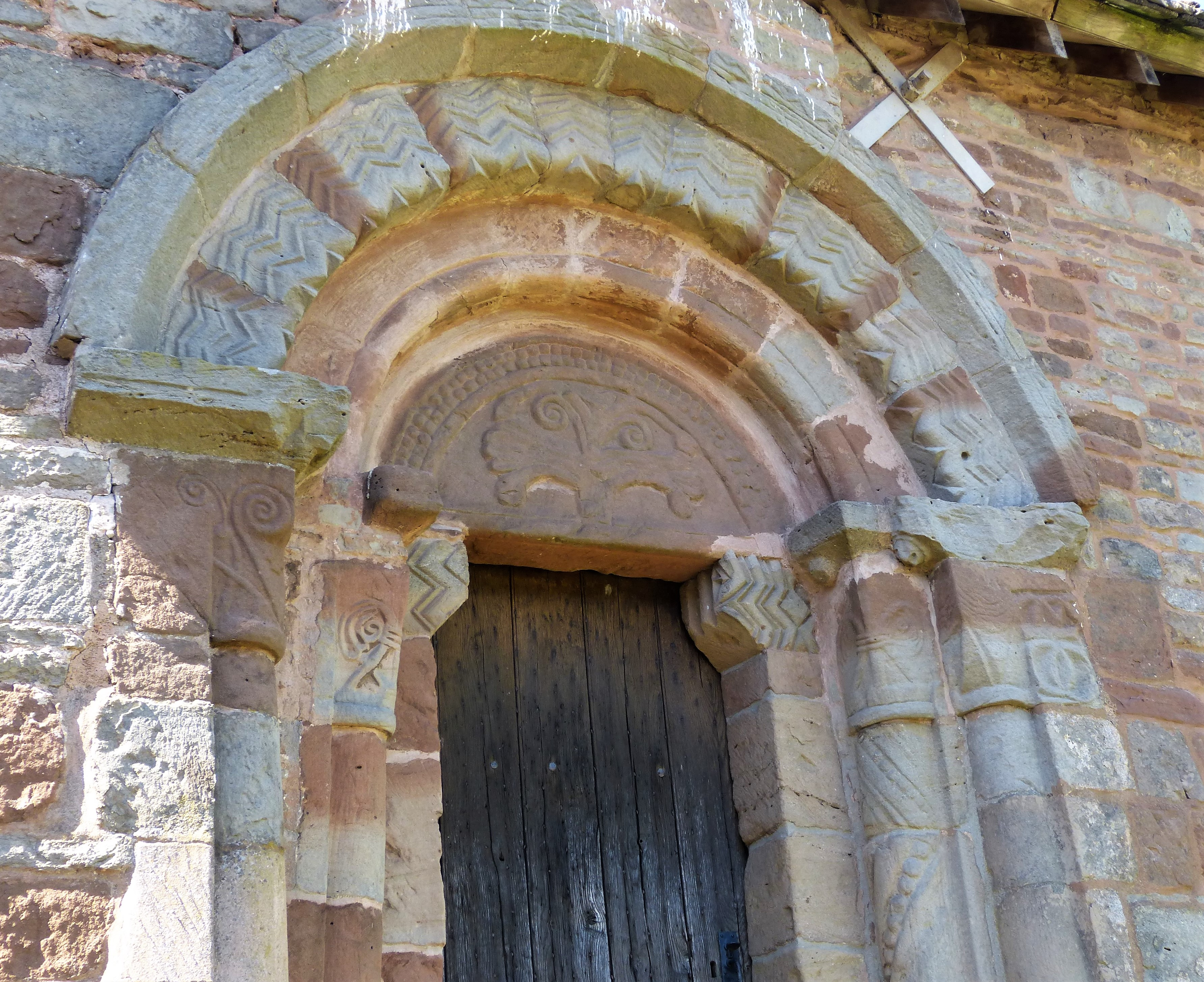
Doorway with carving including tympanum

== See also ==
- List of churches preserved by the Churches Conservation Trust in the English Midlands
