= Eyton, Herefordshire =

Village in Herefordshire, England

Coordinates: 52.25°N 2.77°W

Eyton
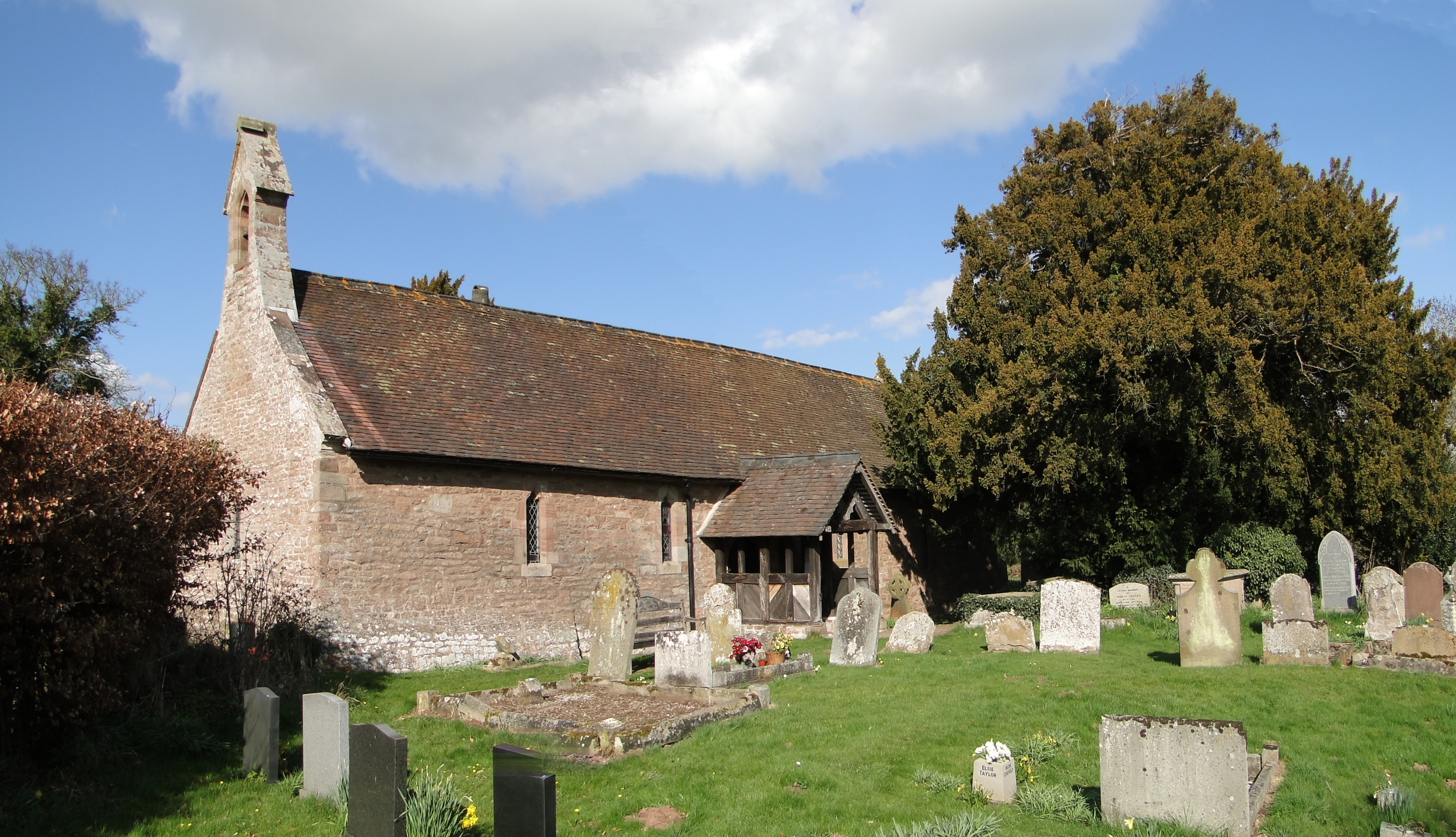
- All Saints' Church, Eyton

- Location within Herefordshire
- Population: 124
- OS grid reference: SO475616
- Civil parish: Eyton
- Unitary authority: Herefordshire
- Ceremonial county: Herefordshire
- Region: West Midlands
- Country: England
- Sovereign state: United Kingdom
- Post town: Leominster
- Postcode district: HR6
- Dialling code: 01568
- Police: West Mercia
- Fire: Hereford and Worcester
- Ambulance: West Midlands
- UK Parliament: North Herefordshire

Eyton ( /ˈeɪtən/ AY-tən) is a village and parish in Herefordshire, England. It is 2 miles (3 km) north west of Leominster and 15 miles (24 km) north of Hereford. The village church is Norman and dedicated to All Saints. The parish had a population of 124 at the time of the 2011 census.

Eyton is mentioned in the Domesday Book as "Ettone" and was part of the manor of Leominster.

In 1552 the Elizabethan writer and geographer Richard Hakluyt, known for his compilations of documents on contemporary voyages of exploration and for promoting the settlement of North America by the English, was born here.
