= Grange Court =

- Grange Court in November 2013
- Interactive map of the Grange Court area
- Former names: The Butter Crosse

General information
- Type: Market hall
- Location: Pinsley Road, Leominster, England
- Coordinates: 52.22772°N 2.73481°W
- Completed: 1633
- Renovated: 1859; 2013
- Owner: LARC Development Trust

Technical details
- Structural system: Timber frame

Design and construction
- Architect: John Abel
- Designations: Grade II* listed

Website
- www.grangecourt.org

Grange Court is a former market hall in Leominster, Herefordshire, England. It was built in 1633 by John Abel, and moved to its present location in 1859. It was then used as a private house until the 1930s, and is now once again a civic building.

== Architecture ==
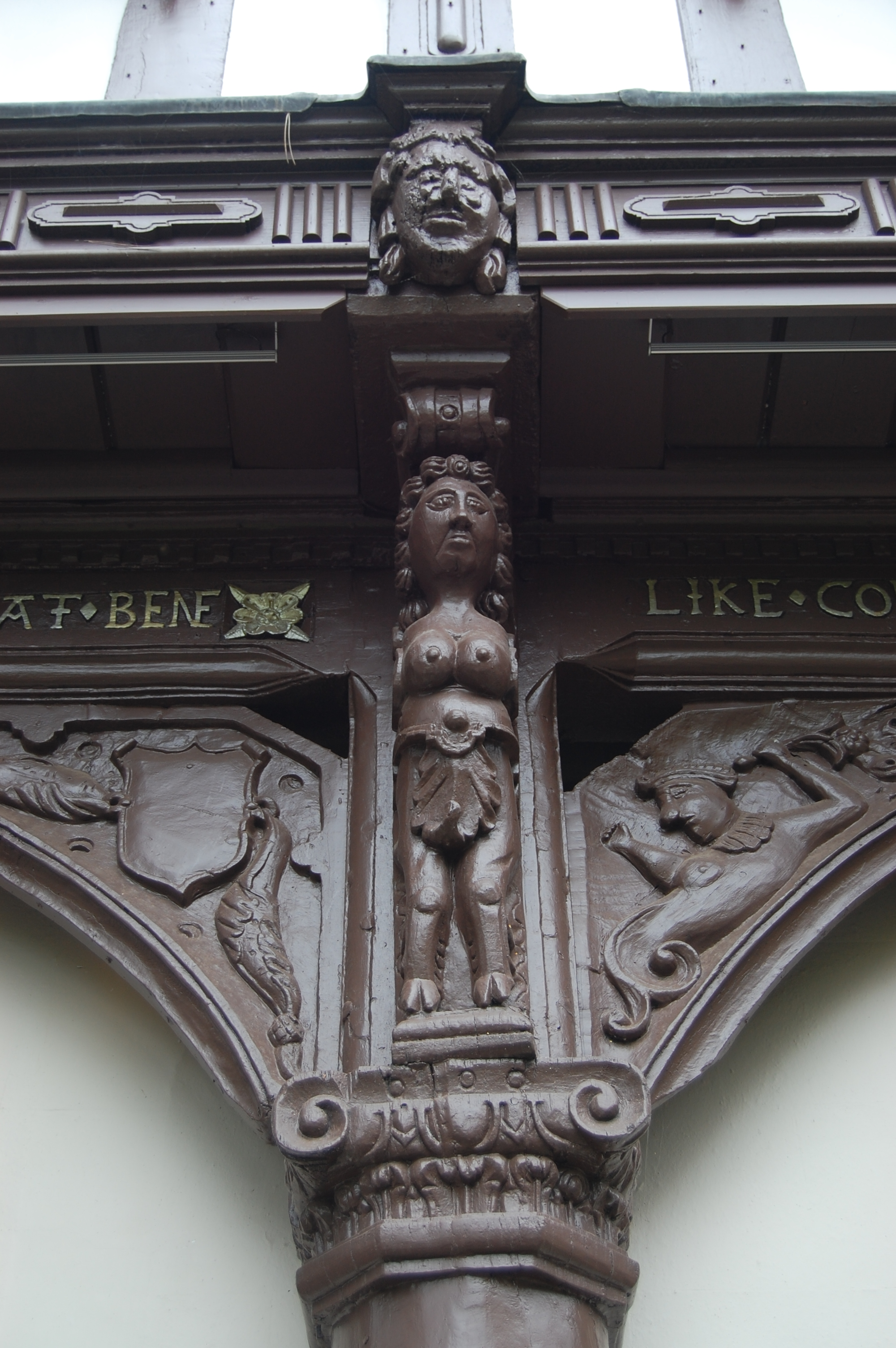
Some of the building's carvings

The timber-framed building is extravagantly decorated with carvings, including mermaids, angels, animals, flowers and grotesque people. The entablature above the columns includes a number of carved texts. These read:

- Vive deo gratus toti mundo tumulatus crimine mundatus semper transure paratus ("To God through life all men should raise their monument of thanks and praise And clean from sin should pass their days prepared to cross beyond always")
- Where justice rule there vertu flow
- Vive ut post vivas sat cito si sat bene ("Live in such a way that you may live hereafter")
- Like collumnes do upprop the fabrik of a building so noble gentri doo support the honor of a kingdom
- In memoria aeterna
- Erit iustus 1633

When built by John Abel in 1633, the market hall was open at ground level, being supported on twelve oak columns. It was known as "the Butter Crosse". It has a stone tile roof, a bellcote, and a weathervane dated 1687.

== Original site ==
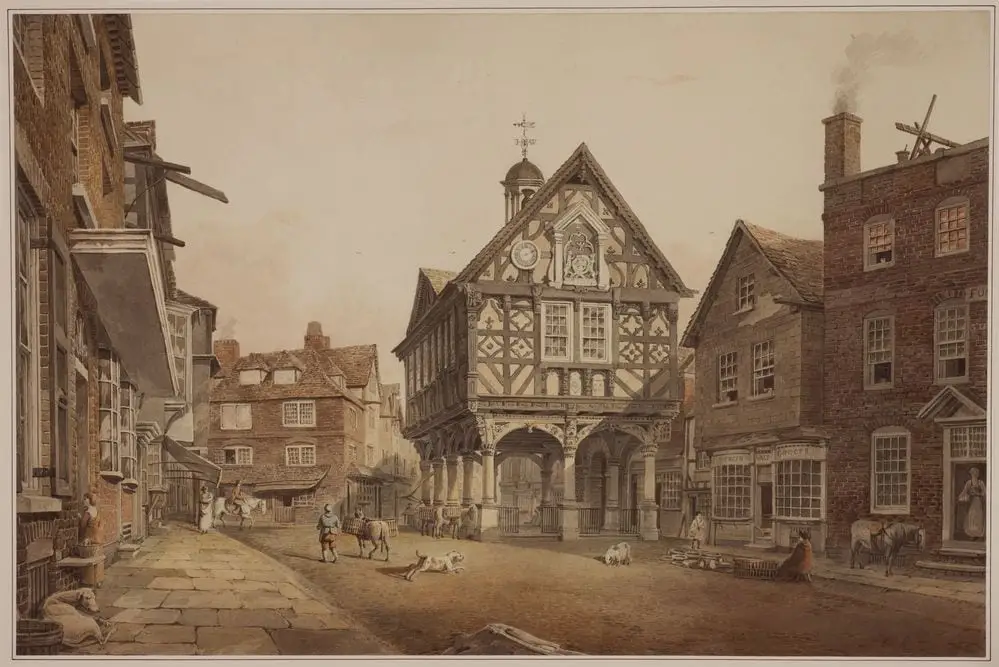
Undated watercolour painting by John Varley (1778–1842), showing the building in its original state and location

The market house originally stood on the site of an earlier market building, at the junction of Broad Street, High Street, Church Street, Drapers' Lane, High Street and Burgess Street. In addition to public meetings, it was used for meetings of the town's nine guilds (bakers, butchers, dyers, glovers, mercers, shoemakers, tailors, walkers (fullers) and weavers) and Quarter Session courts, and the town council met there from 1750.

== Rebuilding and later use ==
Eventually, congestion caused by the building's location at an important junction led to calls for its removal. The building was dismantled and stored in the mid-1850s.

It was purchased at auction for £95 by John Hungerford Arkwright, who offered the building to the council if they would re-erect it, but they refused. He moved the building himself and rebuilt it near the priory church in 1859. In the process, the ground floor was enclosed, a three-storey brick extension added at the rear, and the roof replaced.

At some point two terracotta panels by the Leominster sculptor William Storr-Barber (died 1934) were added to the interior.

In 1939, Leominster District Council acquired the building for £3,000 through a compulsory purchase order, thereby thwarting an apparent plan by William Randolph Hearst to remove it for reuse as a gatehouse at St Donat's Castle.

Until 2008, it was used as council offices by the District Council, and later Herefordshire County Council. In 2001, a campaign was started to raise money to restore the building. The work was completed in 2013 and the building, with a modern annexe, is now a community centre (a Community, Enterprise and Heritage Hub), owned by LARC Development Trust, a registered charity which purchased it from Herefordshire County Council for £1 in June 2013, as an instance of community asset transfer. The building is Grade II* listed and is licensed for the conduct of civil marriage ceremonies.

== Model ==
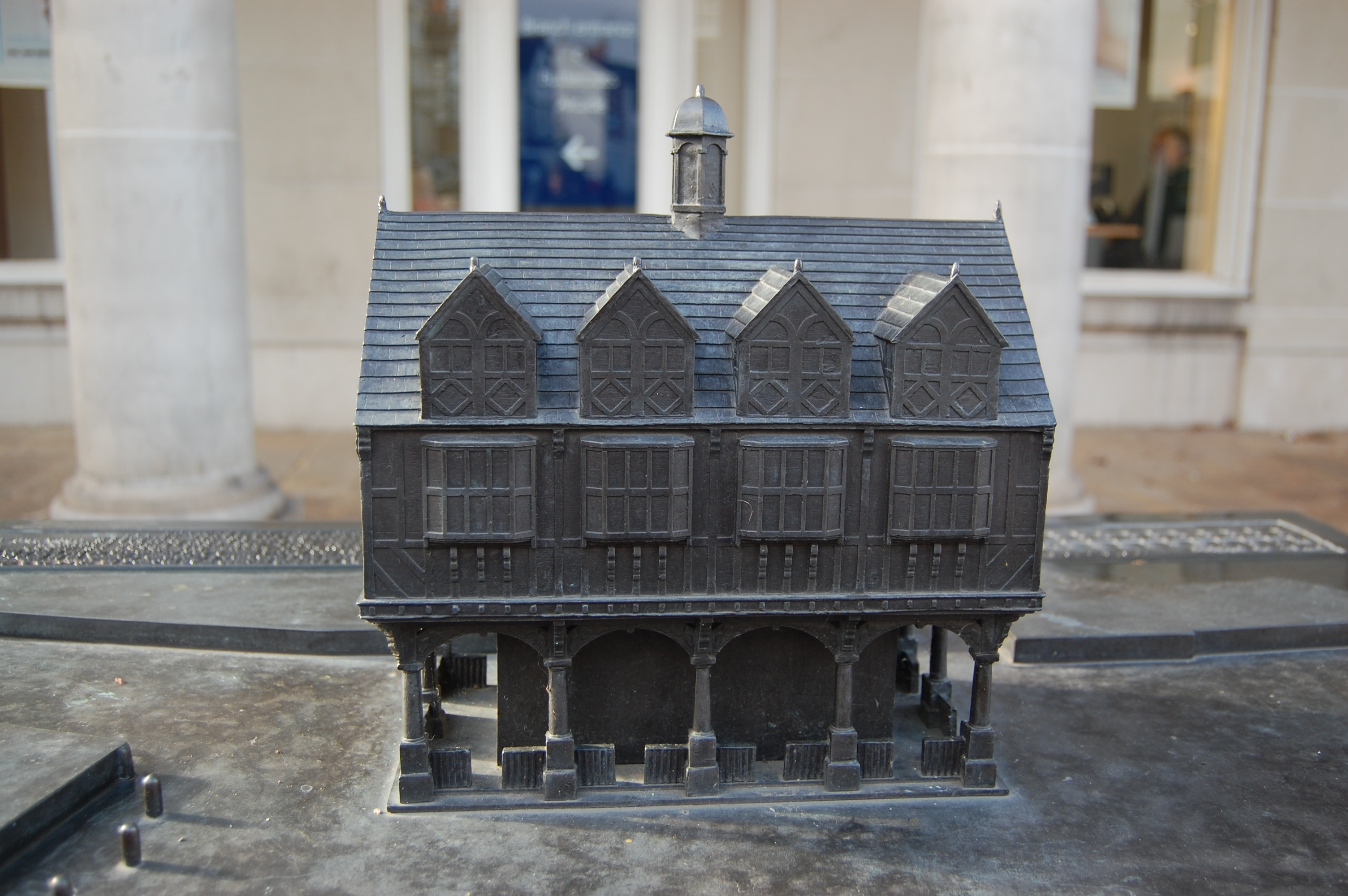
The bronze model, showing the open lower level

A bronze model of the house in its earlier configuration now stands on a plinth at its original location.
