= Luntley =

Luntley is a surname. Notable people with the surname include:

- Edwin Luntley (1857–1921), English footballer
- John Luntley, Welsh Anglican priest
- Michael Luntley (born 1953), British philosopher and professor

== See also ==
- Huntley (name)
- Lutley
