= Llancillo Church =

Church in Herefordshire, England

Coordinates: 51.92502°N 2.92308°W

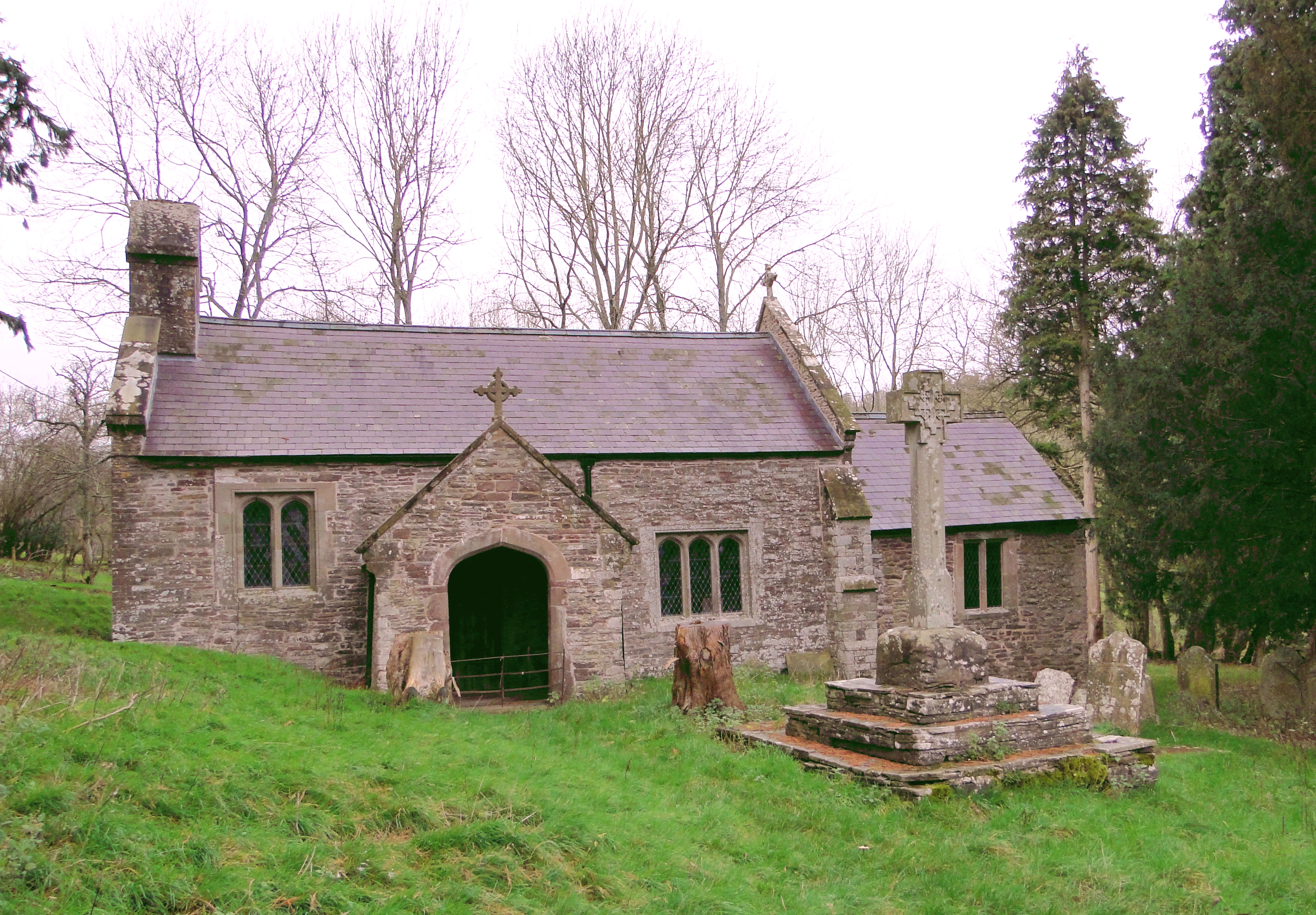
Llancillo Church

Llancillo Church (also spelled Llancilo) is a Grade II*-listed redundant church in Herefordshire, England, near the Welsh border at grid reference SO36622557.

Situated amongst trees and fields, it was dedicated to St Peter and alternatively to St Tysilio. The church was built in the 11th century and has been revised and restored since, including a Victorian restoration in the 1890s.

It contains a font from the 13th century and 17th-century pulpit. One of the bells is believed to have been cast in the 13th century or earlier.

== History ==
It is thought that the remote site was first used by a hermit in the 6th century but that the current chancel dates from the 11th century and the rest of the church was substantially rebuilt in the 17th century. It underwent Victorian restoration in the 1890s.

Despite being situated in Herefordshire, on the English side of the England–Wales border, the church lay within the Welsh Diocese of St Davids until 1852 when it was transferred to the Diocese of Hereford.

On 22 December 2006, the building was closed for regular public worship and, in 2007, passed to the Friends of Friendless Churches to maintain and restore. Whilst Llancillo remains a civil parish, it now falls within the Church of England parish of Rowlestone and Llancillo.

== Architecture ==
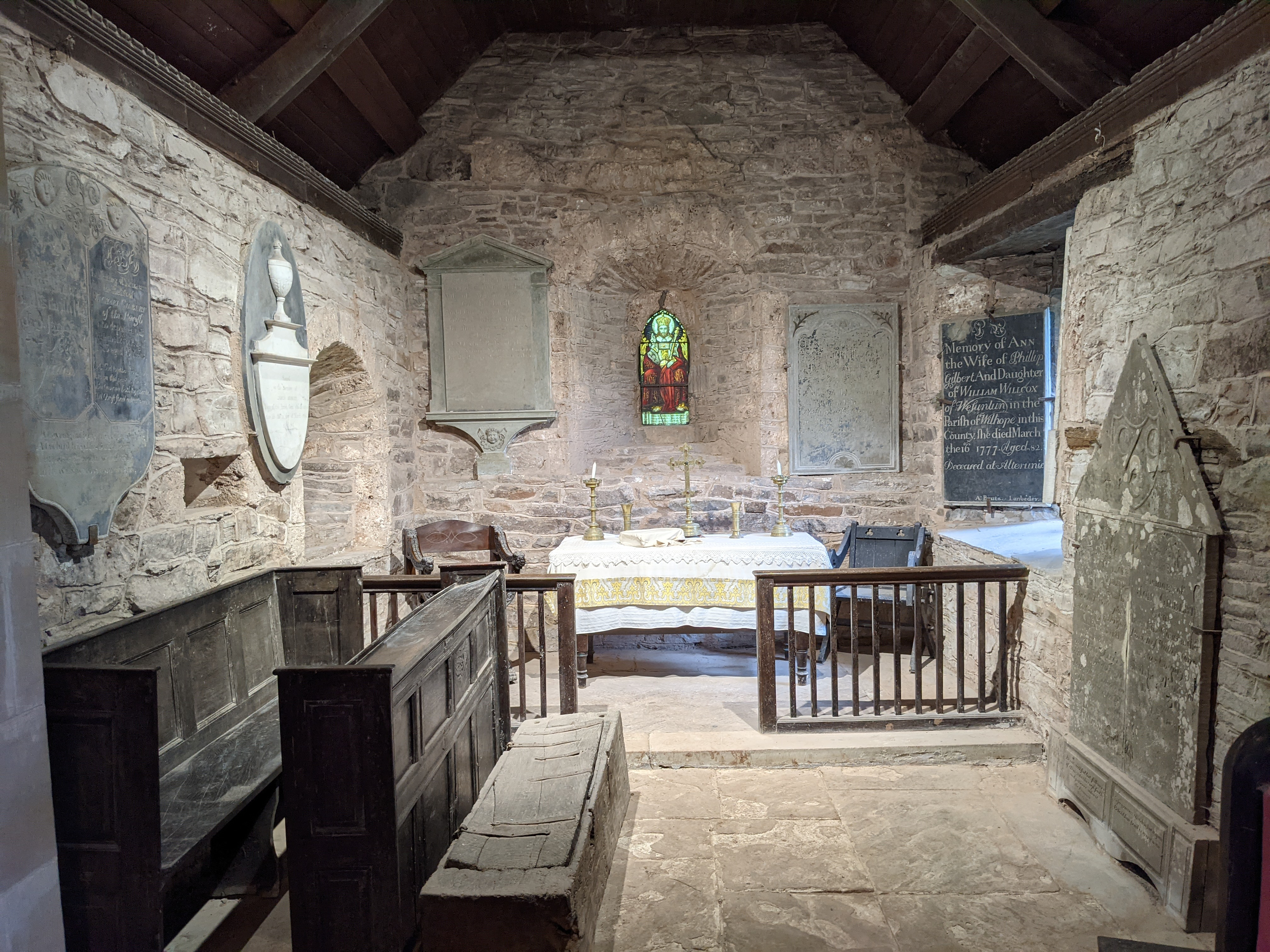
Interior of the chancel

The sandstone building has a slate roof, and tufa dressings. It consists of a 14 feet 6 inches by 11 feet 3 inches (442 cm × 343 cm) chancel and nave which is 37 feet 0 inches by 15 feet 0 inches (1,128 cm × 457 cm) and has a porch on the south side. One of the bells in the bellcote was cast possibly in the 13th century or earlier.

There is a Tudor doorway and, inside, a 13th-century baptismal font. The oak pulpit is from 1632.

In the churchyard are the remains of a 14th-century preaching cross with an octagonal base. Nearby is a mound which is the site of a motte castle.

The church lies on the alleged Walterstone ley line described by Alfred Watkins in his book, The Old Straight Track.
