= Rowlestone =

Village in Herefordshire, England

Coordinates: 51°56′N 2°54′W

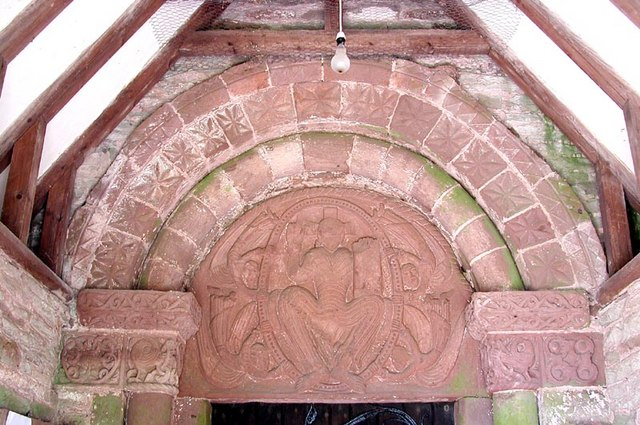
- The tympanum at Rowlestone.

- Location within Herefordshire
- Population: 180 (2011 Census)
- Unitary authority: Herefordshire
- Shire county: Herefordshire
- Region: West Midlands
- Country: England
- Sovereign state: United Kingdom
- Post town: Hereford
- Postcode district: HR2
- Police: West Mercia
- Fire: Hereford and Worcester
- Ambulance: West Midlands
- UK Parliament: Hereford and South Herefordshire

Rowlestone (also spelled Rowlstone) is a village and civil parish in the county of Herefordshire in England. It is a rural area with agriculture the main source of employment, and had only 87 residents in 2004, increasing to 180 at the 2011 Census.

The area was historically Welsh-speaking. Two Welsh Bibles from Rowlestone, formerly stored in the Rowlestone vicarage and damaged by fire, are kept in the Herefordshire County archives.

It is notable mainly for the Norman parish church of St. Peter, which contains some distinguished carvings, including a tympanum showing Christ in Majesty with four attendant angels. These carvings are of the same distinctive Herefordshire School as those at the nearby Church of St Mary and St David, Kilpeck.
