= Walterstone =

Village in Herefordshire, England

Coordinates: 51°55′08″N 2°57′40″W

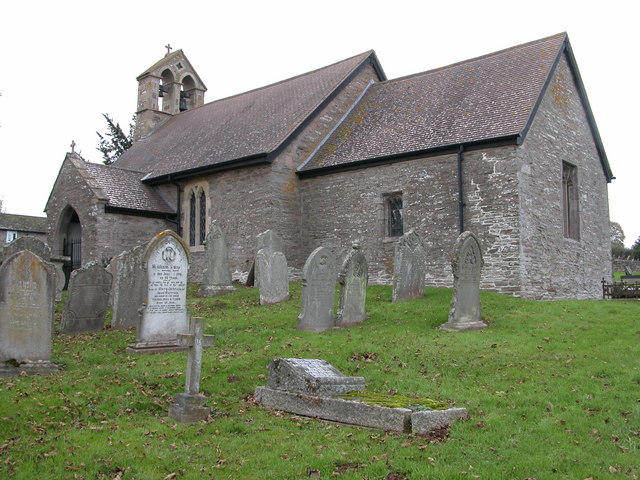
- St Mary's Church

- Location within Herefordshire
- Area: 1.94 sq mi (5.0 km^{2})
- Population: 97 (Parish)
  - Density: 50/sq mi (19/km^{2})
- OS grid reference: SO340250
  - London: 124 miles (200 km) ESE
- Civil parish: Walterstone
- Unitary authority: Herefordshire
- Ceremonial county: Herefordshire
- Region: West Midlands
- Country: England
- Sovereign state: United Kingdom
- Post town: HEREFORD
- Postcode district: HR2
- Dialling code: 01873
- Police: West Mercia
- Fire: Hereford and Worcester
- Ambulance: West Midlands
- UK Parliament: Hereford and South Herefordshire

Walterstone is a village and civil parish in Herefordshire, England, near the Welsh border and the Brecon Beacons National Park, 14 miles (23 km) south-west of Hereford. The parish had a population of 97 in the 2001 UK Census and is grouped with Craswall, Llanveynoe and Longtown to form Longtown Group Parish Council for administrative purposes.

== Map ==
There is a motte-and-bailey castle in the village to the west of St Mary's church and an Iron Age hill fort on high ground two-thirds of a mile (1.1 km) to the east. The River Monnow and the Welsh Marches railway line share a valley south-east of the village.

Allt Yr Ynys, a Grade II listed 16th-century manor house 1 1/4 miles (2.0 km) south of the village, has been a country house hotel. The Grade II listed parish church of St Mary is part of the Ewyas Harold group of parishes. In the chancel, there is early 17th-century stained-glass depicting the quartered arms of the Cecils, brought from the nearby Allt Yr Ynys. The churchyard cross is listed Grade II*.

The 300-year-old village pub, the Carpenter's Arms, is situated next to the church and has been in the same family for the last 100 years.

== History ==
In the 18th century, a Roman mosaic was reported to have been found in the parish. The exact site is not known but is thought to be in the Coed-y-Grafel area north of the village.

== Demographics ==
In the 1870s the Imperial Gazetteer recorded the area of the village as 1,241 acres (502 ha) with a population of 173.
