= Leinthall Earls =

Village in Herefordshire, England

Coordinates: 52°18′N 2°49′W

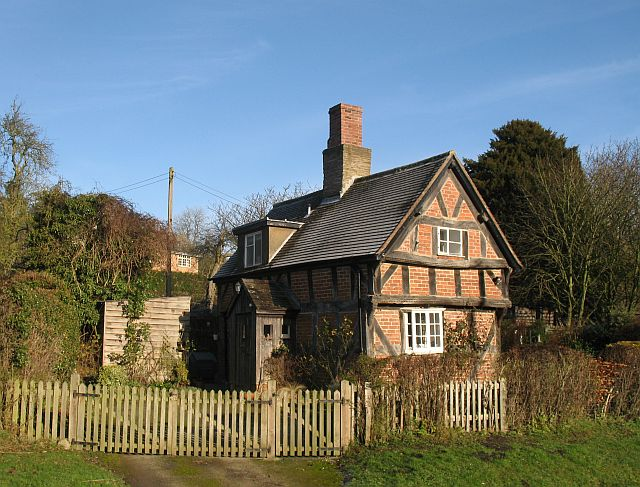
- Timber-framed cottage in Leinthall Earls with jettying and brick nogging

- Location within Herefordshire
- Civil parish: Aymestrey
- Unitary authority: Herefordshire
- Shire county: Herefordshire
- Region: West Midlands
- Country: England
- Sovereign state: United Kingdom
- Post town: Leominster
- Postcode district: HR6
- Police: West Mercia
- Fire: Hereford and Worcester
- Ambulance: West Midlands
- UK Parliament: North Herefordshire

Leinthall Earls or Leinthall Earles is a village in Aymestrey civil parish, Herefordshire, England.

== Parish church ==
The earliest parts of the Church of England parish church or St Andrew are 12th-century Norman. It is part of a single benefice with the parishes of Aymestrey and Kingsland.

== Quarry ==
Leinthall Earls Quarry is north of the village. Up to 2,000 tonnes of aggregate are quarried there daily. A geological fault runs roughly southwest – northeast just south of the quarry, and is downthrown to the south.
