= Grade II* listed buildings in Herefordshire (M–Z) =

Herefordshire shown in England

There are over 20,000 Grade II* listed buildings in England. This article comprises a list of these buildings in the county of Herefordshire.

== List ==
Name	Location	Type	Completed (Note: The date given is the date used by Historic England as significant for the initial building or that of an important part in the structure's description.)	Date designated	Grid ref. (Note: The grid reference is based on the British national grid reference system, sometimes known as OSGB36, used by the Ordnance Survey.) Geo-coordinates	Entry number (Note: The "List Entry Number" is a unique number assigned to each listed building and scheduled monument by Historic England.)	Image
41a Bridge Street	Hereford, County of Herefordshire	Box Frame House	Late 14th century	23 December 1987	SO5079339758; 52°03′14″N 2°43′09″W	1205588	Upload Photo
60 St Owen Street	Hereford	House	13th century	22 October 1973	SO5137139758; 52°03′15″N 2°42′38″W	1196876	Upload Photo
29, 30 and 30a Castle Street	Hereford	House	Early 18th century	10 June 1952	SO5116639740; 52°03′14″N 2°42′49″W	1205955	29, 30 and 30a Castle Street More images
31 Castle Street	Hereford	House	Mid 18th century	10 June 1952	SO5115039747; 52°03′14″N 2°42′50″W	1205978	31 Castle Street
20 Church Street	Hereford	House	18th century	10 June 1952	SO5101139882; 52°03′19″N 2°42′57″W	1206265	Upload Photo
10 and 11 Castle Street	Hereford	House	Early 19th century	10 June 1952	SO5124039744; 52°03′14″N 2°42′45″W	1205907	Upload Photo
1a St Owen Street	Hereford	House	Early 19th century	22 October 1973	SO5121139966; 52°03′21″N 2°42′47″W	1207400	Upload Photo
48 and 49 Broad Street	Hereford	House	Early 19th century	10 June 1952	SO5088039962; 52°03′21″N 2°43′04″W	1280611	Upload Photo
9 Castle Street	Hereford	House	Early 19th century	10 June 1952	SO5122939747; 52°03′14″N 2°42′46″W	1297429	Upload Photo
5 and 7 Widemarsh Street	Hereford	House	19th century	10 June 1952	SO5095840067; 52°03′24″N 2°43′00″W	1196893	Upload Photo
1 and 1a Widemarsh Street	Hereford	House	1973	22 October 1973	SO5095940050; 52°03′24″N 2°43′00″W	1297391	1 and 1a Widemarsh Street
3 Castle Hill	Hereford	House	17th century	22 October 1973	SO5113639699; 52°03′13″N 2°42′50″W	1196801	Upload Photo
1 Bell Square	Weobley	House	1987	20 February 1953	SO4013651694; 52°09′37″N 2°52′36″W	1081927	1 Bell Square
1 The Southend	Ledbury	Timber Framed House	c. 1600	18 September 1953	SO7111537565; 52°02′09″N 2°25′21″W	1301682	1 The Southend More images
2 The Southend	Ledbury	Timber Framed House	c. 1600	18 September 1953	SO7111737560; 52°02′08″N 2°25′21″W	1082844	2 The Southend
2 New Street	Ledbury	Timber Framed House	c. 1600	18 September 1953	SO7111037561; 52°02′08″N 2°25′21″W	1082831	2 New Street
4 New Street	Ledbury	Timber Framed House	c. 1600	18 September 1953	SO7110537560; 52°02′08″N 2°25′21″W	1349411	4 New Street More images
30 The Homend	Ledbury	House	18th century	18 September 1953	SO7101737823; 52°02′17″N 2°25′26″W	1349388	30 The Homend More images
Magistrates' House and Nos 1, 2 and 3 Magistrates' Court	Ledbury	Timber Framed House	Early 18th century	18 September 1953	SO7118537736; 52°02′14″N 2°25′17″W	1082904	Magistrates' House and Nos 1, 2 and 3 Magistrates' Court More images
Mahollam Cottages	Mahollam, Kington Rural	House	15th century	19 August 1953	SO2702654355; 52°10′57″N 3°04′07″W	1301272	Upload Photo
47 New Street	Ross-on-Wye	Prison	1820-30	22 October 1952	SO5987324247; 51°54′55″N 2°35′05″W	1349286	47 New Street More images
Man of Ross House	Ross-on-Wye	House	1689	22 October 1952	SO5991924109; 51°54′51″N 2°35′03″W	1098674	Man of Ross House More images
Market House	Ross-on-Wye	House	1660-1674	22 October 1952	SO5991924130; 51°54′51″N 2°35′03″W	1098680	Market House More images
Marlbrook House and attached Outbuilding	Weobley	House	16th century	20 February 1953	SO4020551500; 52°09′31″N 2°52′32″W	1301256	Marlbrook House and attached Outbuilding More images
Michaelchurch Court, Steps and Terrace Walls to Entrance Front	Michaelchurch Escley	House	Early 17th century	29 September 1952	SO3084634397; 52°00′13″N 3°00′32″W	1224391	Upload Photo
Minaret, Boundary Walls and Gate Piers to North of Hope End Hotel	Hope End, near Colwall	Gate Pier	1810-20	15 May 1975	SO7227841227; 52°04′07″N 2°24′21″W	1082143	Upload Photo
Monnington Court	Monnington on Wye, Brobury with Monnington on Wye	House	14th century	20 February 1953	SO3730543356; 52°05′06″N 2°54′59″W	1157849	Monnington Court More images
Mordiford Bridge (that part on Mordiford)	Mordiford	Road Bridge	14th century	26 January 1967	SO5699337454; 52°02′02″N 2°37′42″W	1099818	Mordiford Bridge (that part on Mordiford) More images
Moreton Bridge (that part in Moreton CP)	Moreton on Lugg	Road Bridge	16th century or 17th century	20 October 1952	SO5128545889; 52°06′33″N 2°42′46″W	1099255	Moreton Bridge (that part in Moreton CP) More images
Moreton Bridge (that part in Marden CP)	Marden	Road Bridge	16th century or 17th century	26 January 1967	SO5129245893; 52°06′33″N 2°42′45″W	1178835	Moreton Bridge (that part in Marden CP) More images
Nelson Column	Hereford	Column	c. 1809	10 June 1952	SO5125139576; 52°03′09″N 2°42′44″W	1297466	Nelson Column More images
New Court	Lugwardine	Country House	18th century	11 October 1985	SO5422141180; 52°04′02″N 2°40′09″W	1099834	Upload Photo
New House	Goodrich	Farmhouse	1953	18 May 1953	SO5633519528; 51°52′21″N 2°38′08″W	1099457	New House More images
Northern half of Weobley Stores (4 Portland St)	Weobley	House	17th century	20 February 1953	SO4025751579; 52°09′33″N 2°52′29″W	1301241	Northern half of Weobley Stores (4 Portland St)
Nun Upton	Nun Upton, Brimfield	House	Late 17th century	11 June 1959	SO5419466580; 52°17′44″N 2°40′23″W	1081859	Upload Photo
Eastnor Castle Obelisk	Eastnor Park, Eastnor	Obelisk	1812	10 January 1986	SO7523237827; 52°02′18″N 2°21′45″W	1266786	Eastnor Castle Obelisk More images
Old Court	Bredwardine	Farmhouse	2nd half 14th century	29 September 1952	SO3352144772; 52°05′50″N 2°58′19″W	1099520	Old Court
Old Court	Longtown	Farmhouse	14th century	14 March 1986	SO3375630272; 51°58′01″N 2°57′56″W	1342121	Upload Photo
Old Court Hotel	Whitchurch	Manor House	16th century	18 May 1963	SO5525417423; 51°51′13″N 2°39′04″W	1225292	Old Court Hotel More images
Old Sufton	Mordiford	Country House	16th century	20 October 1952	SO5754138388; 52°02′32″N 2°37′14″W	1301840	Upload Photo
Old Talbot Inn	Ledbury	Hotel	c. 1596	18 September 1953	SO7106437549; 52°02′08″N 2°25′24″W	1082833	Old Talbot Inn More images
Orleton Manor	Orleton	Cross Passage House	late 16th century to early 17th century	11 June 1959	SO4908366964; 52°17′54″N 2°44′53″W	1081810	Upload Photo
Marstow Court Outbuilding	Marstow	House	15th century	26 March 1987	SO5532319201; 51°52′11″N 2°39′01″W	1214715	Upload Photo
Palace Chambers	Hereford	House	1952	10 June 1952	SO5089339790; 52°03′16″N 2°43′03″W	1052295	Palace Chambers
Moreton Jeffries Church	Moreton Jeffries	Parish Church	12th century	9 June 1967	SO6031148487; 52°08′00″N 2°34′53″W	1082237	Moreton Jeffries Church More images
Parish Hall (old Boys School)	Cradley	Parish Hall	1952	9 April 1952	SO7365447105; 52°07′18″N 2°23′10″W	1082300	Parish Hall (old Boys School) More images
Park Farmhouse	Colwall	Farmhouse	C16-C17	18 November 1952	SO7384142372; 52°04′45″N 2°22′59″W	1178575	Park Farmhouse More images
Peg's Farmhouse	Wellington Heath	Farmhouse	14th century	18 November 1952	SO7029341140; 52°04′04″N 2°26′05″W	1224884	Upload Photo
Pembridge Post Office and Stores	Pembridge	House	14th century	16 June 1987	SO3901358084; 52°13′03″N 2°53′39″W	1081730	Upload Photo
Penrhos Court	Penrhos, Lyonshall	Farmhouse	Late 13th century or early 14th century	18 December 1974	SO3169956083; 52°11′55″N 3°00′03″W	1081753	Penrhos Court More images
Perrycroft	Colwall	House	1893-5	18 February 1970	SO7653641803; 52°04′27″N 2°20′38″W	1178660	Perrycroft More images
Phillips House	Much Marcle	House	1703	18 November 1952	SO6584632750; 51°59′32″N 2°29′56″W	1099029	Phillips House More images
Pontrilas Court	Pontrilas, Kentchurch	House	Mid- and Late 17th century	20 May 1987	SO3957327496; 51°56′34″N 2°52′50″W	1099622	Pontrilas Court More images
Poston House	Vowchurch	House	1984	12 November 1984	SO3598537924; 52°02′10″N 2°56′05″W	1225155	Poston House More images
Preaching Cross in Grounds of Coningsby Hospital	Hereford	Preaching Cross	14th century	10 June 1952	SO5115240419; 52°03′36″N 2°42′50″W	1279469	Preaching Cross in Grounds of Coningsby Hospital More images
Priory House	Clifford	Farmhouse	17th century	29 September 1952	SO2543244670; 52°05′43″N 3°05′24″W	1167739	Upload Photo
Putley Church	Putley	Church	12th century	4 December 1985	SO6460737606; 52°02′09″N 2°31′03″W	1099008	Putley Church More images
Red Lion Hotel (Lal Bagh Restaurant)	Weobley	House	17th century	20 February 1953	SO4020951731; 52°09′38″N 2°52′32″W	1349832	Red Lion Hotel (Lal Bagh Restaurant) More images
Blackfriars Priory Ruins	Hereford	Dominican Friary	c. 1276	10 June 1952	SO5119040419; 52°03′36″N 2°42′48″W	1293327	Blackfriars Priory Ruins More images
Lower Brockhampton Farmhouse Chapel Ruins	Brockhampton	Chapel	12th century	9 June 1967	SO6872056031; 52°12′06″N 2°27′33″W	1082377	Lower Brockhampton Farmhouse Chapel Ruins More images
Longworth Roman Catholic Chapel	Bartestree	Chapel	c. 1400	11 October 1985	SO5684540595; 52°03′43″N 2°37′51″W	1099878	Longworth Roman Catholic Chapel More images
Rotherwas Chapel	Rotherwas, Dinedor	Roman Catholic Chapel	Earlier	26 January 1967	SO5361638333; 52°02′29″N 2°40′40″W	1180032	Rotherwas Chapel More images
Rudhall Almshouses	Ross-on-Wye	Almshouse	14th century	22 October 1952	SO5987124099; 51°54′50″N 2°35′05″W	1098698	Rudhall Almshouses More images
Church of St Mary Ruins	Avenbury	Church	Norman	12 April 1973	SO6615553153; 52°10′32″N 2°29′47″W	1349633	Church of St Mary Ruins More images
Ruxton Court	Llangarron	Farmhouse	1963	18 May 1963	SO5409019471; 51°52′19″N 2°40′06″W	1099426	Ruxton Court More images
Serendipity	Ross-on-Wye	House	17th century	22 October 1952	SO5989224143; 51°54′52″N 2°35′04″W	1179457	Serendipity
Shell House	Ledbury	House	Early 18th century	18 September 1953	SO7100837848; 52°02′18″N 2°25′27″W	1179949	Upload Photo
Shelwick Court	Shelwick, Holmer & Shelwick	Farmhouse	15th century	13 October 1980	SO5272743023; 52°05′01″N 2°41′29″W	1099293	Shelwick Court More images
Shire Hall	Hereford	Shire Hall	c1815-17	10 June 1952	SO5124139996; 52°03′22″N 2°42′45″W	1297425	Shire Hall More images
Snodhill Castle	Snodhill, Peterchurch	Bailey	12th century	17 January 1949	SO3224040354; 52°03′27″N 2°59′23″W	1172756	Snodhill Castle More images
Snodhill Court Farmhouse	Snodhill, Peterchurch	Farmhouse	Early 17th century	17 January 1949	SO3192440342; 52°03′26″N 2°59′39″W	1099450	Upload Photo
St Katherine's Chapel, Hall and Stable	Ledbury	Hall House	1330-40	18 September 1953	SO7107737646; 52°02′11″N 2°25′23″W	1179854	St Katherine's Chapel, Hall and Stable More images
St Owen's Chambers and attached Railings	Hereford	House	Early 18th century	10 June 1952	SO5124939862; 52°03′18″N 2°42′45″W	1196871	St Owen's Chambers and attached Railings More images
Langstone Court Stables	Llangarron	Stable	c. 1700	18 May 1953	SO5345222043; 51°53′42″N 2°40′40″W	1099444	Upload Photo
Staick House	Eardisland	House	Late 16th century	20 February 1953	SO4204358743; 52°13′26″N 2°51′00″W	1081908	Staick House More images
Street House	Weston under Penyard	House	Early 18th century	18 May 1953	SO6321323596; 51°54′35″N 2°32′10″W	1099642	Upload Photo
Sufton Court	Mordiford	Country House	c. 1790	11 October 1985	SO5730537941; 52°02′18″N 2°37′26″W	1179699	Sufton Court More images
Perrycroft Summerhouse, Gate and Boundary Walls	Colwall	Gate	c1893-1914	19 September 1984	SO7648141809; 52°04′27″N 2°20′40″W	1349715	Upload Photo
Swan House and School View	Pembridge	House	Late 16th century or early 17th century	25 March 1987	SO3893358139; 52°13′05″N 2°53′43″W	1301065	Upload Photo
Swanstone Court and attached Outbuildings and Hop Kiln	Knapton Green, Dilwyn	House	17th century	20 February 1953	SO4415453001; 52°10′21″N 2°49′05″W	1349817	Upload Photo
Bay Horse Inn	Bromyard, Bromyard and Winslow	Timber Framed House	Early 17th century	25 October 1951	SO6541754651; 52°11′20″N 2°30′26″W	1349643	Bay Horse Inn More images
Church Cottage	Colwall	House	late C16-early 17th century	19 September 1984	SO7393442303; 52°04′42″N 2°22′54″W	1302409	Upload Photo
Church House	Ledbury	Timber Framed House	c. 1600	18 September 1953	SO7119637721; 52°02′14″N 2°25′17″W	1301821	Church House More images
Dairy Farmhouse and attached Barn	Weobley	Farmhouse	15th century	20 February 1953	SO4001651810; 52°09′41″N 2°52′42″W	1166641	Dairy Farmhouse and attached Barn
Feathers Hotel	Ledbury	House	Early 17th century	18 September 1953	SO7109837622; 52°02′10″N 2°25′22″W	1301759	Feathers Hotel More images
Forbury	Leominster	House	Mid 18th century	24 July 1954	SO4973059176; 52°13′43″N 2°44′15″W	1255417	Forbury More images
The Gables	Weobley	House	17th century	20 February 1953	SO4026451670; 52°09′36″N 2°52′29″W	1081893	The Gables More images
The Green	Winslow, Bromyard and Winslow	House	18th century	12 April 1973	SO6243754314; 52°11′09″N 2°33′03″W	1275549	Upload Photo
The Hall	Brampton Bryan	House	17th century with earlier origins	11 June 1959	SO3699772589; 52°20′52″N 2°55′35″W	1349754	The Hall More images
Market Hall	Pembridge	Market Hall	Later	16 October 1967	SO3902558101; 52°13′04″N 2°53′38″W	1081729	Market Hall More images
The Marsh	Eyton	House	14th century	11 June 1959	SO4748961382; 52°14′53″N 2°46′14″W	1166720	Upload Photo
Master's House of St Katherines Hospital (Malvern Hills District Council Office)	Ledbury	House	Added/Altered each Century	5 November 1976	SO7104437658; 52°02′12″N 2°25′25″W	1301731	Master's House of St Katherines Hospital (Malvern Hills District Council Office) More images
Old Corner House	Weobley	House	1987	20 February 1953	SO4021851712; 52°09′38″N 2°52′31″W	1166418	Old Corner House
Old Grammar School	Ledbury	Teachers House/Museum	Late 15th century	18 September 1953	SO7117137729; 52°02′14″N 2°25′18″W	1301848	Old Grammar School More images
Old Grammar School	Weobley	House	Mid 19th century	20 February 1953	SO4037151530; 52°09′32″N 2°52′23″W	1081901	Upload Photo
Old Manor	Weobley	Base Cruck House	14th century	20 February 1953	SO4014851699; 52°09′37″N 2°52′35″W	1349868	Old Manor More images
Pound Farmhouse	Kington Rural	Farmhouse	Late 19th century	19 August 1953	SO2894254175; 52°10′52″N 3°02′26″W	1166590	Upload Photo
The Rodd	Rodd, Nash and Little Brampton	Country House	1629	19 August 1953	SO3222762607; 52°15′27″N 2°59′40″W	1081457	The Rodd More images
The Steppes	Ledbury	Timber Framed House	c. 1600	18 September 1953	SO7103937564; 52°02′09″N 2°25′25″W	1082838	The Steppes More images
The Throne	Weobley	Farmhouse	16th century	20 February 1953	SO4038051566; 52°09′33″N 2°52′23″W	1081899	The Throne More images
Town Council Offices	Ledbury	House	c. 1600	18 September 1953	SO7112637731; 52°02′14″N 2°25′20″W	1082903	Town Council Offices More images
Vauld Farmhouse	The Vauld, Marden	Farmhouse	16th century	20 October 1952	SO5319249486; 52°08′30″N 2°41′07″W	1179095	Vauld Farmhouse More images
Thinghill Grange	Withington	Farmhouse	14th century	26 January 1967	SO5513145267; 52°06′14″N 2°39′23″W	1348998	Upload Photo
Tower Hill House	Bromyard, Bromyard and Winslow	Timber Framed House	1630	25 October 1951	SO6547954455; 52°11′14″N 2°30′23″W	1349646	Tower Hill House More images
Town Hall	Hereford	Town Hall	c. 1904	22 October 1973	SO5119639918; 52°03′20″N 2°42′47″W	1279640	Town Hall More images
Tudor House Antiques	Ledbury	Timber Framed House	17th century	18 September 1953	SO7099237882; 52°02′19″N 2°25′28″W	1082864	Tudor House Antiques More images
Ty Mawr	Longtown	Farmhouse	14th century	29 September 1952	SO3217226626; 51°56′02″N 2°59′17″W	1342122	Upload Photo
Unicorn House	Weobley	House	Mid 19th century	20 February 1953	SO4031851572; 52°09′33″N 2°52′26″W	1349837	Unicorn House More images
Upper Court	Clifford	Farmhouse	Mid 16th century	29 September 1952	SO2441745400; 52°06′06″N 3°06′18″W	1099497	Upload Photo
Upper House Farmhouse	Eardisley	Farmhouse	15th century	19 August 1953	SO3104849714; 52°08′29″N 3°00′32″W	1157429	Upload Photo
Upper Limebrook Farmhouse	Limebrook, Wigmore	Farmhouse	15th century	11 June 1959	SO3749566567; 52°17′37″N 2°55′04″W	1081743	Upload Photo
Upper Wyhall	Walford	House	16th century	18 May 1953	SO5968920745; 51°53′02″N 2°35′13″W	1167566	Upload Photo
Upton Court	Little Hereford	Farmhouse	late 16th century or early 17th century	11 June 1959	SO5513766027; 52°17′26″N 2°39′33″W	1167003	Upload Photo
Upton Court	Upton Bishop	Farmhouse	14th century	18 May 1953	SO6578428155; 51°57′03″N 2°29′57″W	1166877	Upload Photo
Urishay Castle Chapel	Peterchurch	Private Chapel	Early 12th century	17 January 1949	SO3229637611; 52°01′58″N 2°59′18″W	1099487	Urishay Castle Chapel More images
Walsopthorne Farmhouse	Ashperton	Farmhouse	c. 1600	26 March 1986	SO6502942320; 52°04′41″N 2°30′42″W	1302708	Walsopthorne Farmhouse
Walter Scott Charity School	Ross-on-Wye	Gate Pier	1717	22 October 1952	SO6005424030; 51°54′48″N 2°34′56″W	1098685	Walter Scott Charity School
Weston Hall	Weston under Penyard	House	c. 1600	18 May 1953	SO6264323679; 51°54′37″N 2°32′40″W	1099643	Weston Hall More images
Wharton Court	Wharton, Leominster	House	1603	24 July 1954	SO5111855862; 52°11′56″N 2°43′00″W	1255348	Wharton Court
Whitbourne Hall	Meadow Green, Whitbourne	Country House	1860-2	9 April 1952	SO7042456768; 52°12′30″N 2°26′03″W	1275628	Whitbourne Hall More images
White Cross	Hereford	Cross	c. 1370	10 June 1952	SO4931140664; 52°03′43″N 2°44′27″W	1196892	White Cross More images
White House and Attached Service Wing to Rear	St Margarets	House	Early 19th century	29 September 1952	SO3494335639; 52°00′55″N 2°56′58″W	1266559	Upload Photo
White House Farmhouse	St Devereux	Farmhouse	15th century	26 January 1967	SO4532232165; 51°59′07″N 2°47′51″W	1099587	Upload Photo
Willersley Court	Willersley, Willersley and Winforton	Farmhouse	Early 16th century	19 August 1953	SO3117847429; 52°07′15″N 3°00′24″W	1157569	Willersley Court More images
Woodhouse Farmhouse	Staplow, Ledbury	Farmhouse	14th century	18 November 1952	SO6899541212; 52°04′06″N 2°27′13″W	1224740	Upload Photo
Wooding Farmhouse	Thornbury	House	C16/17	9 April 1952	SO6174059618; 52°14′00″N 2°33′42″W	1275938	Upload Photo
Worcester Lodge to Brockhampton Park	Brockhampton Park, Brockhampton	Estate Cottage	18th century	9 June 1967	SO6883354560; 52°11′18″N 2°27′26″W	1176667	Upload Photo

== See also ==
- Grade I listed buildings in Herefordshire
