= Dormington =

Village in Herefordshire, England

Coordinates: 52.0584°N 2.60916°W

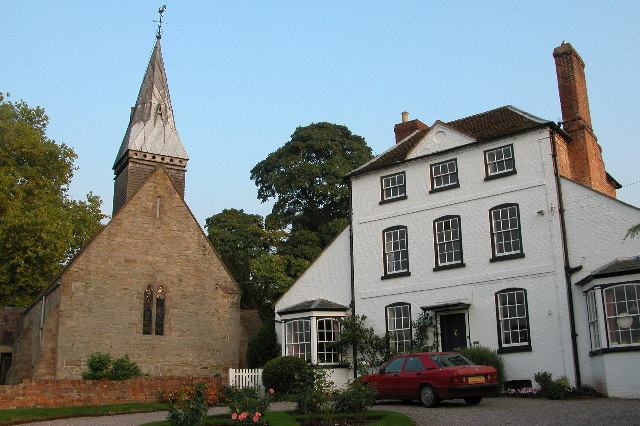
- St Peter's Church and Dormington House

- Location within Herefordshire
- OS grid reference: SO583401
  - London: 115 mi (185 km) WNW
- Unitary authority: Herefordshire
- Ceremonial county: Herefordshire
- Region: West Midlands
- Country: England
- Sovereign state: United Kingdom
- Post town: Hereford
- Postcode district: HR1
- Dialling code: 01432
- Police: West Mercia
- Fire: Hereford and Worcester
- Ambulance: West Midlands
- UK Parliament: Hereford and South Herefordshire

Dormington is a village and civil parish in Herefordshire, in the West Midlands of England. Dormington village is at the north of its parish, 5 miles (8 km) east from the centre of the city and county town of Hereford, and 8 miles (13 km) west-northwest from the town of Ledbury. The parish is a significant traditional centre for hop growing.

== History ==
In the Domesday Book, Dormington is listed as "Dermentune", in the Greytree Hundred of Herefordshire. The settlement contained two households, with one smallholder and a slave. The Lord of the manor in 1066 was Estan the canon, who was only associated with this one manor at the time. The lordship in 1086 was transferred to Walter, with the canons of St Guthlac's Priory in Hereford becoming Tenant-in-chief to king William I.

Dormington was recorded as 'Dorminton' in 1206, being an estate associated with a person name deriving from the Old English Dēormōd or Dēormund with 'ing' or 'tūn'.

In 1911, a Roman pavement and Roman Key were found at Dormington House, the parsonage next to St Peter's Church; a further investigation in 1951 revealed no evidence of such. In 1942, at the southeast of Perton Quarry within Dormington were found Romano-British fragments of pottery. Two sets of medieval strip lynchets, agricultural earth terraces, exist 1,000 yards (900 m) to the east of the village.

In the 19th century, Dormington ecclesiastical parish included the chapelry and township of Bartestree. It was on the Hereford, Ledbury and Worcester section of the Great Western Railway, and was in the Hereford petty sessional division, Union—poor relief provision set up under the Poor Law Amendment Act 1834—and county court district, and the Archdeaconry and Diocese of Hereford. The church register dates to 1690. The church incumbency was under a vicarage, which provided a residence and 6 acres (20,000 m^{2}) of glebe—an area of productive land directly supporting the incumbent and church—within Dormington and 74 acres (0.3 km^{2}) at other parishes. The perpetual curracy of Bartestree was subordinate to Dormington. The Bartestree part of the ecclesiastical parish included the Church of St James, rebuilt in 1877. The Catholic Convent of Our Lady of Charity and Refuge was established in Bartestree in 1863, to the designs of E. W. Pugin with later additions, to conduct the "reformation of fallen women", its funding derived from the revenues of the convent's foundation and from inmates' laundry work and underclothing manufacture. The convent was part of the Order of Our Lady of Charity, founded in 1641 by Saint John Eudes at Caen. Attached to the convent was a pre-Reformation chapel (Longworth Roman Catholic Chapel), physically transferred from Longworth and re-erected in 1870.

In 1851, there were 128 inhabitants of Dormington, plus 61 in Bartestree township. Dormington trades listed included four farmers, including one at 'Clastons' in the northwest of the parish, and William Vevers at Dormington Court; at Barstree there were three farmers. In 1861 Dormington population was 77, in 941 acres (3.8 km^{2}) of land, with Lady Emily Foley as lady of the manor and chief landowner. Dormington Court was described as attached to "an extensive farm", and the residence of Thomas Vevers. Further trades included four farmers, including those at Prospect cottage, Prior's Court, and Glaston. The population of Bartestree was 61 within 410 acres (1.7 km^{2}), with Bartestree Court "an extensive farm" occupied and owned by William Vevers. There were two other farmers listed. Land use at the time was chiefly for pasture and the growing of hops, wheat and beans.

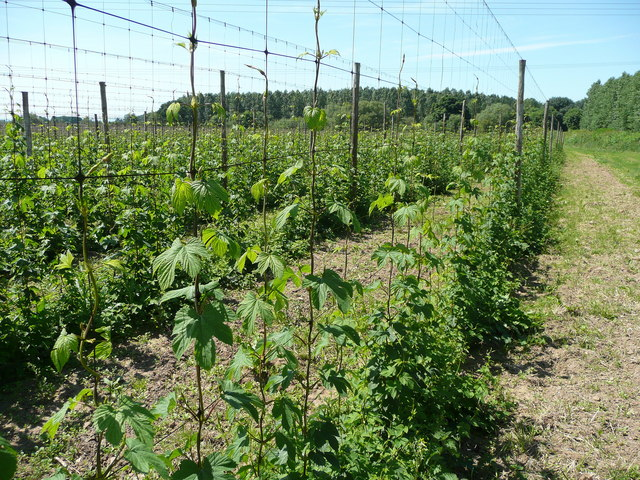
Hop-growing in Dormington

In 1909, the Lord of the manor and chief landowner was Paul Henry Foley of Stoke Edith Park in Stoke Edith parish. Population of Dormington in 1901 was 95, without Barstree. Land and water area combined was 977 acres (4 km^{2}). The soil was red loam on which were "several extensive hop grounds". The area of Bartestree was 421 acres (1.7 km^{2}), in which was arable land, pasture meadow and hop growing, with a 1901 population of 265. Commercial listings included a farmer and hop grower at Dormington Court, and a farmer at 'Clastons' who was a hop grower and also a breeder of pure bred Hereford cattle and pedigree Ryland sheep, and a farmer and hop grower at Prior's Court. At Bartestree was a farmer at Bartestree Court who was also a hop grower and cider maker, a further farmer, and a farm bailiff. In 1931 Dormington had a population of 108, with its vicarage now under the rectory of Stoke Edith. There was still a farmer at Prospect Farm, and three others who were also hop growers, at Dormington court, Wooton, and Claston. Kelley's mentioned "several extensive hop grounds in this locality".

Hop growing with machine harvesting, usually in September, is still carried out, particularly on 230 acres (0.93 km^{2}) of land at Claston Farm at the north-east of the village on the A438 road. Between the 1950s and 1960s commercial hop-picking by hand ended. Before then family teams of pickers included those from The Midlands and South Wales, augmenting those from traveller families. The introduction of new varieties of dwarf hops at Dormington, which grow in the form of hedges, were seen as more conducive to machine harvesting.

== Governance ==
Dormington has a joint parish council with the neighbouring parish of Mordiford.

The parish is in the Hereford and South Herefordshire Parliamentary constituency; the sitting member is Jesse Norman of the Conservative Party. Prior to Brexit in 2020 it was part of the West Midlands European Parliament constituency of the European Parliament.

== Geography ==
Dormington village is at the south side of the A438 road with its junction with Clay Hill Pit (road). Within the village is St Peter's Church, within the Deanery of Hereford. The part of the village at its south is known as Upper Dormington. Dormington village is connected by bus to Hereford and Ledbury.

The parish, narrow in proportion to its length, is orientated north-west to south-east stretching a distance of 3 miles (5 km). Bordering parishes are Bartestree at the north-west, Weston Beggard at the north, Stoke Edith at the east, and Mordiford at the south-west. The parish comprises farms, fields, woodland and dispersed residential properties, and, at the east on Perton Lane, part of Perton Quarry which produces crushed limestone and lies mainly in the parish of Stoke Edith. The disused Dormington Quarry is to the south-east of Perton Quarry. The A438 road, running locally from Hereford to Ledbury, runs east to west through north of the parish. The River Frome flows through the extreme north-west of the parish.

In 2011, the Dormington with Stoke Edith parish area was 804.89 hectares (1,990 acres) in which lived 261 people.

== Landmarks ==
The Church of St Peter, within the village, is a Grade II* listed late 13th-century parish church in Decorated style, comprising a nave and chancel, with roofs dating to at least the 17th century. A vestry, south porch, and bell turret with broach spire were added under an 1877 restoration. The chancel contains windows dating to the 14th century, and the nave windows dating to the 13th; all other listed buildings in the parish are Grade II. Dormington House, immediately adjacent to the church at its west, is a three-storey late 18th or early 19th-century house, formerly the parsonage, built in 1764, today with a whitewashed front facade.

To the east of the church is Dormington Court, a 17th-century part timber framed, part brick two-storey country house with 18th-century additions. Its original associated farm buildings included a racing stable block, were all removed to allow the development of the present residential estate to its north-east. William Vevers (1782-1858) of Dormington Court, was a horse breeder and trainer, and rode steeplechasers in the first half of the 19th-century, competing in Hunters’ Stakes, particularly at the Hereford Races, Warwick Races and Cardiff Races, and over hurdles at Cardiff and Monmouth. He trained the 1841 Grand National winner, Charity, for William Craven, 2nd Earl of Craven. Vevers rode his last steeplechase at the age of 67, which he won.

Today's farmhouse at Backberry Hill Farm, 400 yards (370 m) south-east from the church, is listed as Prospect Farmhouse, a timber-framed house, of part one storey and part two, with attics, and an external stair to the loft, dating to the early 16th century with later additions up to the 18th. North-east and adjacent to the farmhouse is a late 18th or early 19th-century "barn with attached stables and cart-shed".

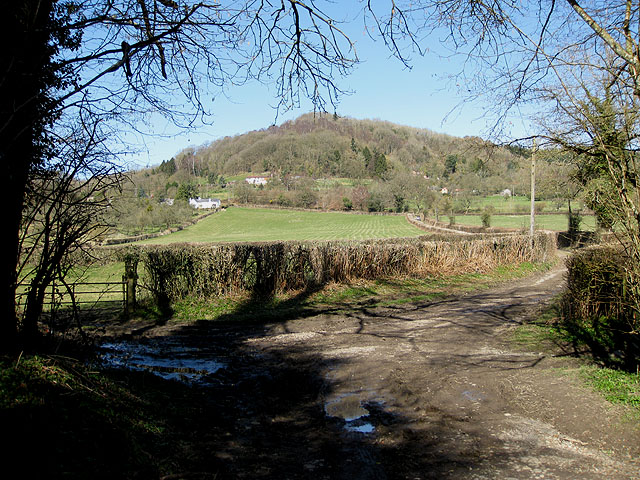
Backbury Camp (Hill) from Mordiford

Listed buildings and structures away from the village include an 18th-century barn of sandstone rubble and with an internal threshing floor north-west of Prior's Court Farmhouse at the west of the parish and 600 yards (550 m) south-west from the village. At the north-west on the A438 road is an early 19th-century cast iron milepost with the inscriptions "Dormington parish", "Hereford 5 miles" "Ledbury 9 miles".

At Claston Farm, close to the north-east of the village, is a two-storey tiled-roof house dating to the 17th century, with a modern extension. To the south of the house is a timber-framed barn also dating to the 17th century. A further granary is probably 18th-century.

Wooton Farmhouse is a 17th- or early 18th-century two storey timber-framed house with brick infill, south from Perton Quarry and 1,600 yards (1,500 m) south-east from the village on Perton Lane. Also at Wooton Farm is a 19th-century cider house, an early 18th-century granary, and a late 18th- to early 19th-century hop kiln.

At the south of the parish near the border with Mordiford and on a hill between Prior's Court Wood and Cockshoot Wood, are the earthwork remains of Backbury Camp (called Ethelbert's Camp before 1926), an Iron Age promontory hillfort with a triple rampart and defensive ditches, covering an area of 8 acres (30,000 m^{2}).
