= The Godwins Hotel, Bartestree =

Coordinates: 52°04′03″N 2°38′34″W

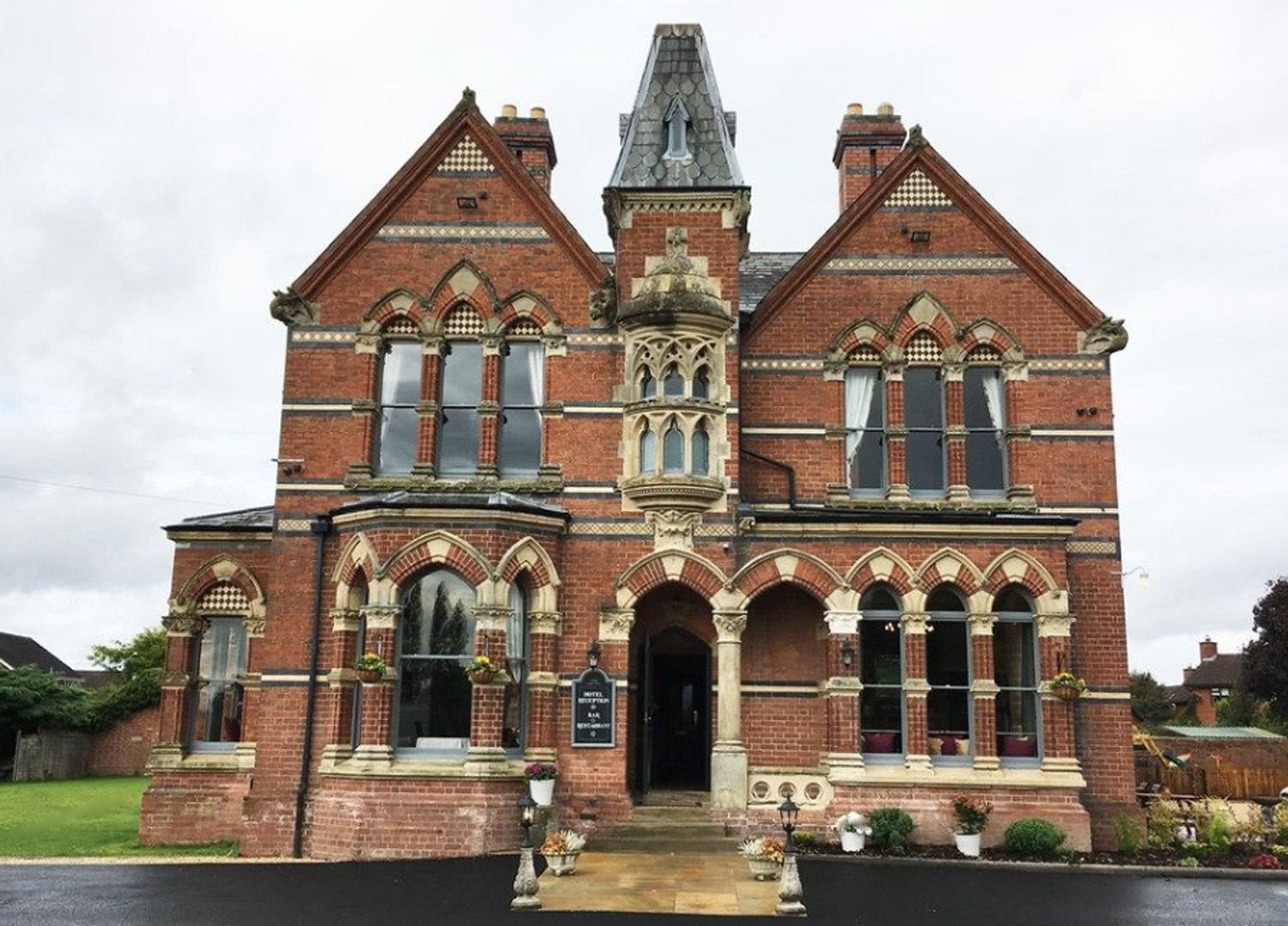
The Godwins Hotel

The Godwins Hotel in Bartestree, Herefordshire, England, is a building of historical significance and is Grade II listed on the English Heritage Register. It was built in 1879 by William Henry Godwin the owner of the famous tile manufacturing firm of Messrs William Godwin and Sons. These beautiful, multi-coloured tiles are still covering floors, fireplaces and wall boarders at the hotel.

== The Godwin family ==
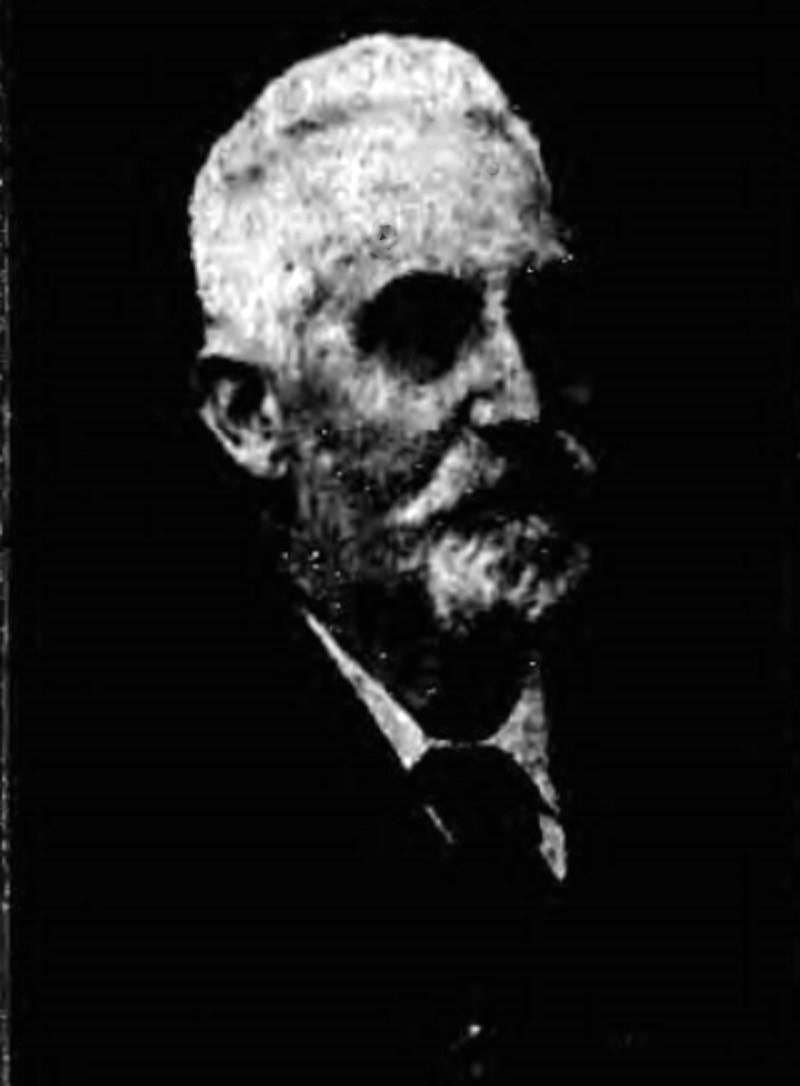
William Henry Godwin

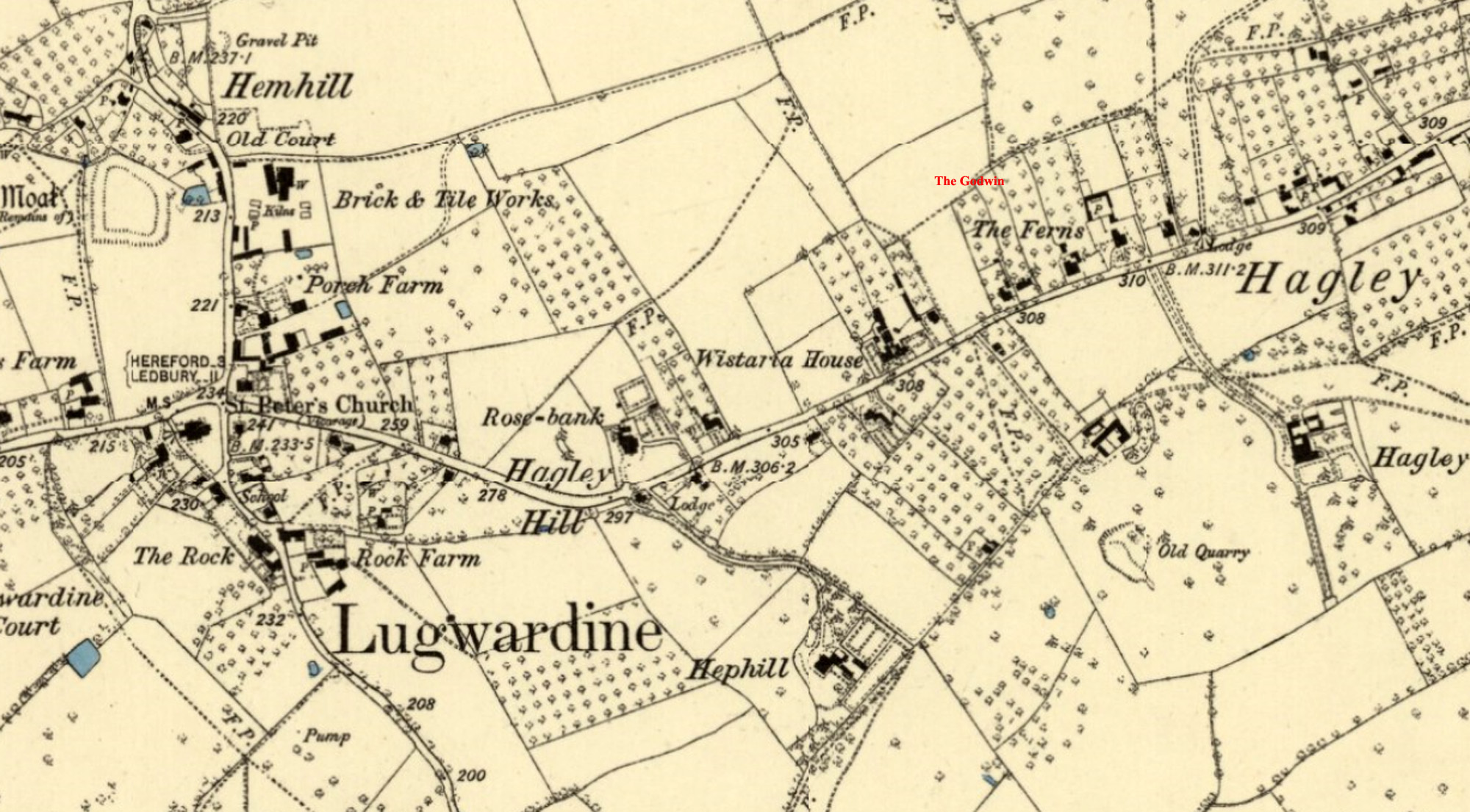
Map of Lugwardine in 1886

William Henry Godwin (1841–1925) built The Godwins (then called “The Ferns”) in 1875. He was born in 1841 in Ledbury and was the son of William Godwin who founded the tile manufacturing tile firm of Messrs William Godwin and Sons in Lugwardine in 1848. The factory's location can be seen on the map. William joined the family company and became quite wealthy.

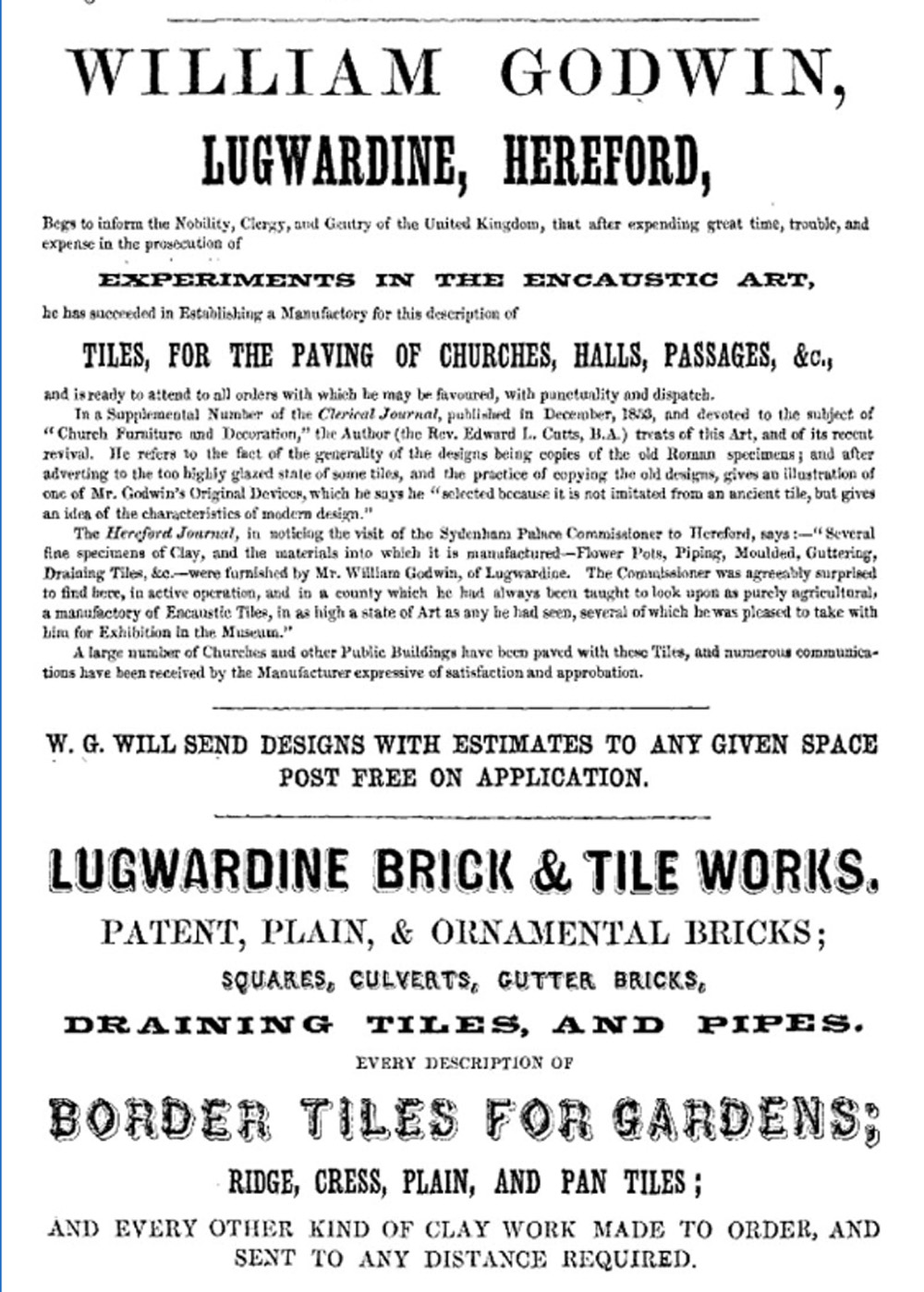
Ad for Godwin tiles

Godwin tiles were highly regarded and used extensively in many buildings. In 1890 the journal Building News made the following observation.

"Godwin paid particular attention to the reproduction of medieval patterns in their entirety – both to facsimile of form and ornament and antique appearance. Of surface. He therefore attracted the attention of the late Sir Gilbert Scott who was so well satisfied with his productions that he invariably specified that Mr Godwin’s tiles be used in the many works with which he was connected… Mr Godwin’s tiles have been used to pave no less than ten English, one Scotch, three Welsh, and two Colonial Cathedrals besides many thousands of churches and secular buildings."

In 1865 William married Elizabeth Tyler who was the daughter of Richard Tyler of Weston Beggard. The couple had five children, three sons and two daughters. William took an interest in community affairs and for some time represented the Lugwardine Division on the Herefordshire County Council.

He also became a renowned breeder of pedigree cattle and sheep. The Australian newspapers often mentioned the quality of his sheep. In 1889 The Australian Town and Country Journal said that the Chief Justice "had imported one ram and ten ewes from the well-known flock of W. H. Godwin of the Ferns." They added "Mr Godwin is a famous breeder of sheep and the introduction of some of his stock to the colony is an important event in the history of pastoral pursuits."

In 1914 the house was advertised for sale and sometime later was bought by John Herbert Berrow who lived with his two unmarried sisters Emily and Laura at nearby Pomona Farm. William and his family moved to Porch House in Lugwardine. Elizabeth died in 1922 and William died in 1925.

== The house today ==
The Ferns was converted to a hotel is now called The Godwins. It is a traditional country pub offering restaurant and accommodation facilities.
