= Shirehall, Hereford =

County building in Hereford, Herefordshire, England

Hereford Shirehall
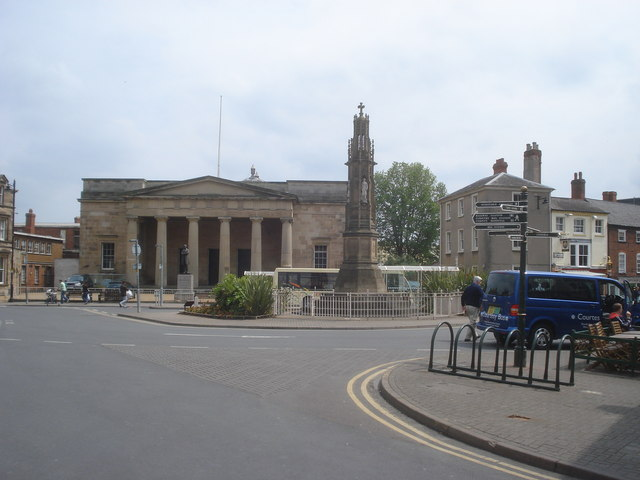
- The Shire Hall and war memorial Looking north-east across St Peters Square

- Location within Herefordshire
- 52.05609°N 2.7129°W
- Location: Hereford

History
- Built: 1817

Site notes
- Architect(s): Charles Heather and Sir Robert Smirke
- Architectural style: Classical style

Listed Building – Grade II*
- Designated: 10 June 1952
- Reference no.: 1297425

The Shirehall is a building on St Peter's Square, Hereford, England. It has been designated by English Heritage as a grade II* listed building.

== History ==
Hereford County Offices Act 1815
- Act of Parliament
- Parliament of the United Kingdom
- Long title: An Act for erecting a Shire Hall, Courts of Justice and other Buildings, for Public Purposes; and for providing suitable Accommodations for His Majesty's Justices of Assize, in and for the County of Hereford.
- Citation: 55 Geo. 3. c. ix
- Territorial extent: United Kingdom

Dates
- Royal assent: 23 March 1815
- Commencement: 23 March 1815 (Note: The Acts of Parliament (Commencement) Act 1793.)
- Repealed: 31 January 2013

Other legislation
- Amended by: Statute Law (Repeals) Act 1998
- Repealed by: Statute Law (Repeals) Act 2013

Status: Repealed

Text of statute as originally enacted

The Hereford County Offices Act 1815 (55 Geo. 3. c. ix) allowed for "erecting a Shire Hall, Courts of Justice and other Buildings, for Public Purposes; and for providing suitable Accommodations for His Majesty's Justices of Assize, in and for the County of Hereford". The Shirehall, which was designed by Charles Heather under the instruction of Sir Robert Smirke in the Classical style, was completed in 1817. The design involved a symmetrical main frontage facing onto St Peter's Square; the central section featured a hexastyle portico with Doric order columns supporting a frieze with triglyphs and a pediment. The principal rooms included a Great Hall, a Grand Jury Room, a library and some courtrooms. A statue of the former Chancellor of the Exchequer, Sir George Cornewall Lewis, by Carlo Marochetti was unveiled outside the Shirehall in 1864.

Although originally used as a facility for dispensing justice, following the implementation of the Local Government Act 1888, which established county councils in every county, it also became the meeting place of Herefordshire County Council. The county council met at the Shirehall, but also acquired nearby properties to serve as its offices, notably including a former children's home at 39 Bath Street which was bought by the council and converted into offices in 1936.

In a celebrated case at the time, a solicitor, Herbert Armstrong, was tried at the Shirehall and convicted in April 1922 of murdering his wife, Katharine.

After the Herefordshire County Council was abolished in 1974, the new authority, Hereford and Worcester County Council was initially based at the Shire Hall in Worcester but moved its base to County Hall in Worcester in 1978. However with the creation of the unitary authority known as Herefordshire Council in 1998, meetings of the new body with county-wide responsibilities were once again being held at the Shirehall in Hereford.

Some council staff relocated from the council's former base at Brockington to the Shirehall in August 2014, so allowing the Shirehall to form part of the "civic hub", along with Hereford Town Hall. A plaque was unveiled by the Lord Lieutenant of Herefordshire, Susan Bligh, Countess of Darnley, to commemorate the 200th anniversary of the opening of the Shirehall, in October 2017.

The building, which continued to host Crown Court hearings, suffered a ceiling collapse in one of the courtrooms in June 2020; the incident happened on a Sunday when the building was unoccupied and so no staff or members of the public were injured.

== See also ==
- Grade II* listed buildings in Herefordshire
