= St Mary's Roman Catholic High School, Lugwardine =

St Mary's Roman Catholic High School

Location
- Lugwardine; Hereford, Herefordshire; England
- Coordinates: 52°03′51″N 2°39′31″W

Information
- Type: Voluntary aided school
- Religious affiliation: Roman Catholic
- Established: 1861; 165 years ago
- Founder: The sisters of Charity
- Local authority: Herefordshire
- Department for Education URN: 116992 Tables
- Ofsted: Reports
- Headteacher: Stuart Wetson
- Gender: Coeducational
- Age: 11 to 16
- Enrolment: 745
- Houses: DePaul, Laboure, Marillac, Thouret, Virgo
- Website: http://www.st-maryshigh.hereford.sch.uk/

St. Mary's Roman Catholic School is a coeducational secondary school in the village of Lugwardine in Herefordshire, England which takes children of ages 11 to 16, ranked by Ofsted as Herefordshire's best state school based on GCSE results from the last 10 years. It is also a centre of excellence for English and the arts, having won the national student debating championship many times in recent years. The current headteacher is Mr. Wetson.

In 2011 the school celebrated its 150th anniversary. Celebrations started on the week commencing 27 June, culminating in a major outdoor Mass attended by its three Roman Catholic feeder schools in Herefordshire (St Joseph's RC Primary School in Ross-on-Wye, Our Lady's Catholic Primary School and St Francis Xavier's RC Primary School in Hereford) on 2 July with additional public events.

In 2021 the school was at the centre of controversy surrounding the teaching of sex and relationship education. On 20 April 2021, the school was inspected by Ofsted because Her Majesty's Chief Inspector "was concerned about pupils' personal development, and the effectiveness of leadership and management (including governance) at the school". The inspection was conducted due to "concerns that the school's current RSE programme encourages misogynistic and discriminatory attitudes". The formal inspection report letter of 14 May 2021 highlighted further priorities for improvement.
