= Urishay Castle =

Castle in Peterchurch, Herefordshire, United Kingdom

Coordinates: 52.0323°N 2.9882°W

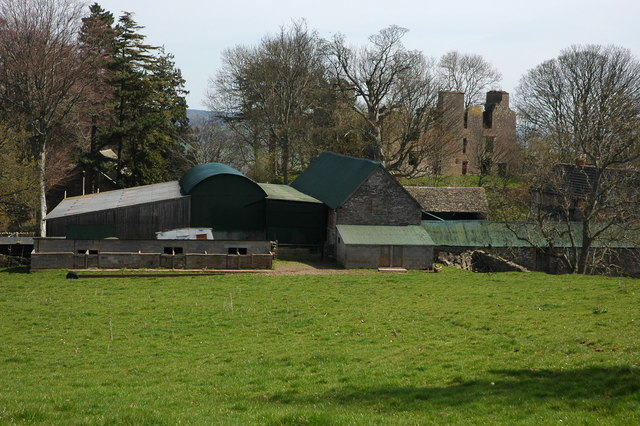
Urishay Castle Farm and Urishay Castle

Urishay constitutes the remains of a castle, 16th century chapel and 17th century house located about 2.5 km west of Peterchurch in Herefordshire, England.

== History of the site ==
The first part of the name Urishay is derived from "Ulric" or "Urri" who was a twelfth-century tenant of the estate. The second part of the name comes from the word "Hay", meaning an enclosure in open woodland where wild game could be trapped.

Urishay Castle, was converted into a large house, which is now derelict and dismantled in 1921.

== Urishay Castle today ==
There are remains of a motte on which lies a ruined house dating back to the 17th or 18th century. The ruins of Urishay Castle Chapel, which dates to the 12th century, are owned and maintained by the Friends of Friendless Churches. The chancel contains a stone altar with five crosses on its surface.

Urishay Castle is a Scheduled Ancient Monument and a grade II* Listed Building.

== Baker University ==
The Collins Library at Baker University in Baldwin City, Kansas houses a 15th-century room that came from Urishay Castle. The room, which was installed around 1908, is known today as the Urishay Room.

== Further reading & external links ==
- Friends of Friendless Churches: Urishay Chapel
- Historic Herefordshire: Castles of Herefordshire contains a detailed description of Urishay Castle today including an illustration of the remains.
- The Urishay Castle Room at Baker University
- Photos of Urishay Castle on geograph
- Castle Facts - Urishay Castle
