= Moreton Jeffries Church =

Coordinates: 52.1333°N 2.5813°W

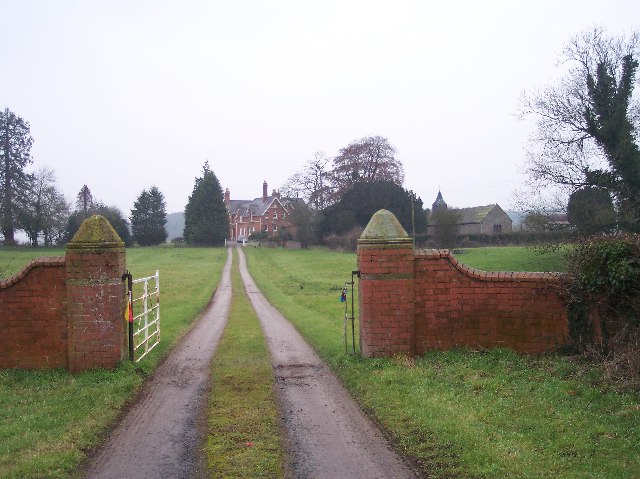
- Moreton Jeffries Church and Moreton House

- Location in Herefordshire
- OS grid reference: SO 603 484
- Location: Moreton Jeffries, Herefordshire
- Country: England
- Denomination: Anglican
- Website: Churches Conservation Trust

Architecture
- Functional status: Redundant
- Heritage designation: Grade II*
- Designated: 9 June 1967
- Architectural type: Church

Specifications
- Materials: Sandstone, tiled roofs

Moreton Jeffries Church is a redundant Anglican church in the hamlet of Moreton Jeffries, some 9 miles (14 km) northeast of Hereford, Herefordshire, England. It is recorded in the National Heritage List for England as a designated Grade II* listed building, and is under the care of the Churches Conservation Trust.

== History ==
The church was built in the 13th or early 14th century, and was extended to the west at a later date. It was restored in the 18th century. A further restoration was carried out in 1860 by John Morley. It was declared redundant in 1980 and vested in the Churches Conservation Trust in 1984.

== Architecture ==
Constructed in sandstone, the church has a tiled roof. Its plan is simple, having a nave and chancel under one roof, a south porch, and an embraced bellcote at the west end. The bellcote is timber framed and hung with slates. The external appearance of the church is Gothic Revival in style, although it contains older fabric. The oldest part of the medieval church is the south doorway, and the roof is also probably from the medieval period. In the south wall are two two-light windows. The north wall contains one similar window, and other blocked windows and a doorway. The east window has three lights.

The interior of the church is plastered, and the floor is tiled, some of the tiles being encaustic. Many of the furnishings date from the 17th and 18th centuries. These include the chancel screen and the pulpit. The latter is Jacobean in style, and has a sounding board and a reading desk. The seating includes benches from the same period, and one box pew. The font consists of a round freestone bowl with a marble basin, standing on a black marble stem. On the east wall are Commandment boards, and there are boards with the Lord's Prayer and the Apostles' Creed on the west wall. The memorials include a brass plate to John Morley, the restorer of the church, who died in 1899. The church has two bells, one dating from the 16th century, the other cast in 1709.

== See also ==
- List of churches preserved by the Churches Conservation Trust in the English Midlands
