= Hereford Town Hall =

Municipal building in Hereford, Herefordshire, England

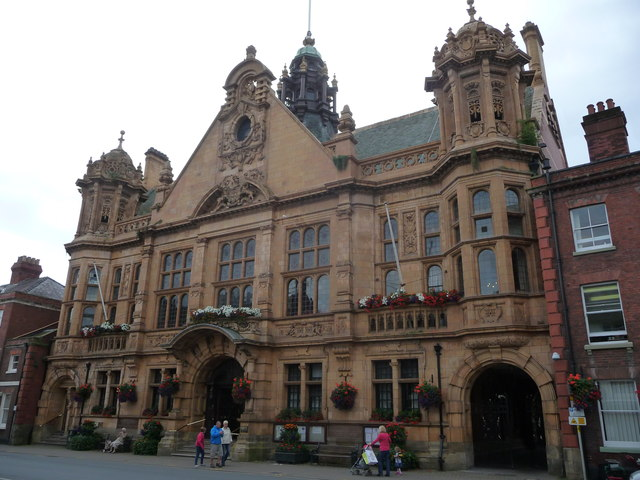
- Hereford Town Hall

- Shown in Herefordshire
- 52.0554°N 2.7131°W
- Location: St Owen's Street, Hereford

History
- Built: 1904

Site notes
- Architect: Henry Cheers
- Architectural style: Edwardian Baroque style

Listed Building – Grade II*
- Official name: Town Hall
- Designated: 22 October 1973
- Reference no.: 1279640

Hereford Town Hall is a municipal building in St Owen's Street, Hereford, Herefordshire, England. The building, which is the home of Hereford City Council, is a Grade II* listed building.

== History ==
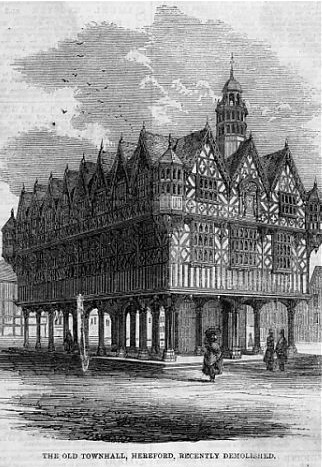
Old print showing the old town hall, prior to its 1792 remodel

The original town hall, also known as the Market Hall, was an ornate timber building in the Tudor style which had been completed in 1620. It was described by Nikolaus Pevsner as "a sight to thrill any visitor from England or abroad. It was the most fantastic black and white building imaginable, three-storeyed, with gables and the richest, most curious decoration." In 1792, the top floor and tower were removed due to concerns about the strength of the timber supporting columns, and the remaining structure was re-roofed and covered with plaster.

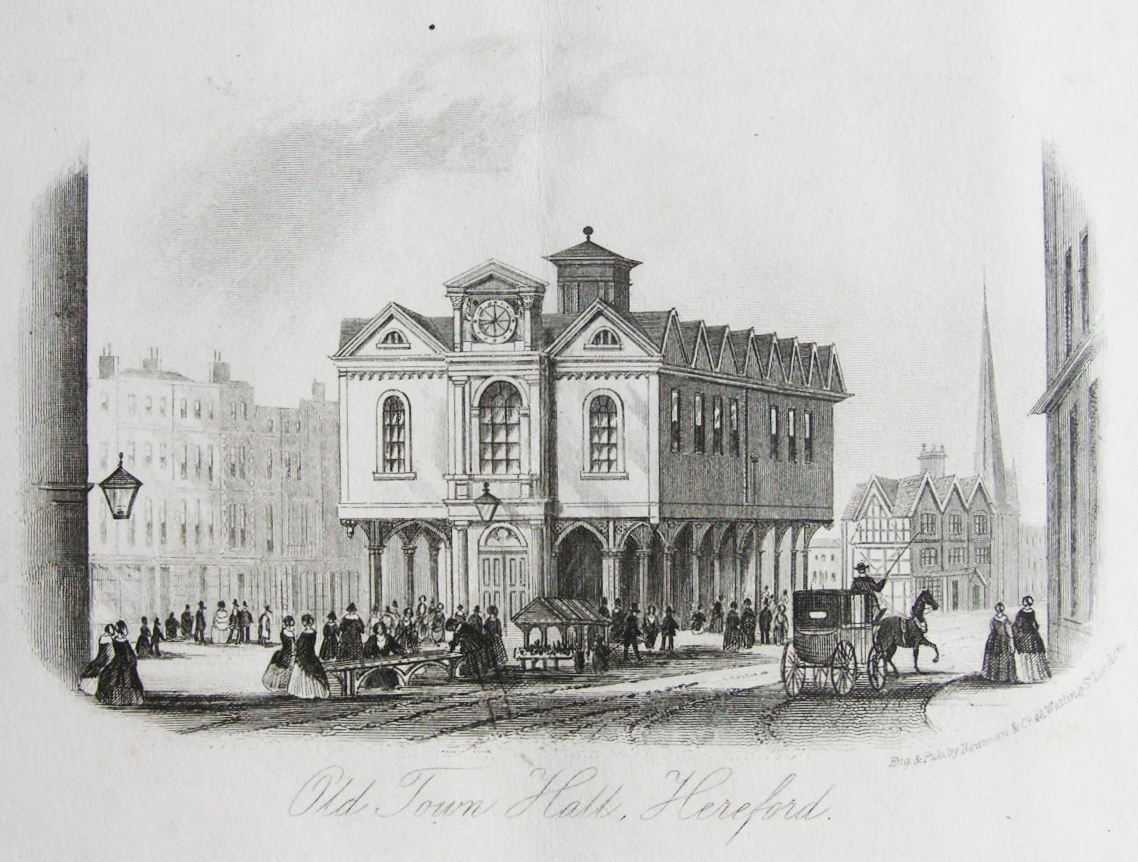
Old print showing the old town hall, as it stood from 1792 until its demolition in 1862

The town hall and its adjacent structures were known as Butcher's Row, named after the public market which operated in the open space between the buildings' pillars. In 1862, Butcher's Row was demolished to improve traffic flow. Surviving structures include the similarly-designed Grange Court and Old House.

In the late 19th century, civic leaders decided to procure a new town hall: the site they had selected had been occupied by a row of residential properties. The foundation stone for the new building was laid by Princess Beatrice of the United Kingdom on 13 May 1902. It was designed by Henry Cheers in the Edwardian Baroque style, built with terracotta facings by W. J. Bowers and was completed in 1904. The design involved a symmetrical main frontage with seven bays facing onto St Owen's Street with the end bays containing oriel windows below towers with domes; the central section of three bays featured an arched doorway with rusticated columns on the ground floor, mullioned tri-partite windows spanning the first and second floors and an open pediment containing a coat of arms with an oculus above. Internally, the principal rooms were the council chamber and the main assembly hall.

The town hall was the headquarters of Hereford City Council for much of the 20th century and continued to be the local seat of government when Hereford District Council was formed in 1974. Queen Elizabeth II, accompanied by the Duke of Edinburgh, visited the town hall and unveiled a plaque on 24 April 1957.

In autumn 1974 the City of Hereford adopted the frigate, HMS Antelope; following the loss of the ship in May 1982 after it came under attack by four Argentine A-4B Skyhawks during the Falklands War, the mast head and other artifacts were recovered from the South Atlantic and displayed in the town hall.

The town hall ceased its local government role when the enlarged Herefordshire Council was formed at Brockington House in Hereford in 1998. However, in April 2000 the town hall became the home of the newly formed Hereford Town Council, which was itself designated Hereford City Council in October 2000. A programme of restoration works to the façade was completed in July 2019.

== See also ==
- Grade II* listed buildings in Herefordshire
