= Weston Beggard =

Coordinates: 52.068°N 2.608°W

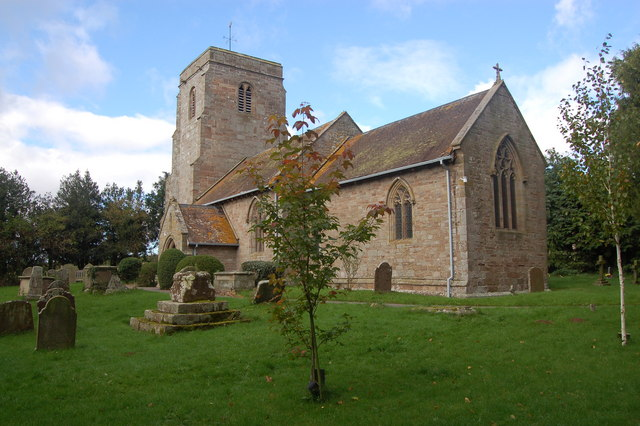
- Church of St John the Baptist

- Location within Herefordshire
- Population: 214 (2011 Census)
- Unitary authority: Herefordshire
- Shire county: Herefordshire
- Region: West Midlands
- Country: England
- Sovereign state: United Kingdom
- Post town: Hereford
- Postcode district: HR1
- Police: West Mercia
- Fire: Hereford and Worcester
- Ambulance: West Midlands
- UK Parliament: North Herefordshire

Weston Beggard is a small civil parish and hamlet in Herefordshire, England. It is located between the villages of Shucknall and Bartestree and lies approximately 6 km east of Hereford. It is on the north bank of the River Frome. The population of this parish at the 2011 Census was 214.

Weston Beggard comprises a series of farms, houses, and a medieval church dating to c. 1200. Most of the current property dates from the Victorian era; however, the manor house at Hillend is c. 1600, and various barn buildings are of a similar age. It is mentioned in the Domesday Book, and though almost a thousand years have passed it has only slightly grown in size and importance.

Weston Beggard, like other agricultural villages in the region, reached its peak during the Victorian era where hops were farmed and milled to be made into beer. This industry is almost dead. Most hop fields have been converted to alternative agricultural uses and the hop barns dotted around the hamlet are either derelict or have been converted into houses.
