= Urishay Castle Chapel =

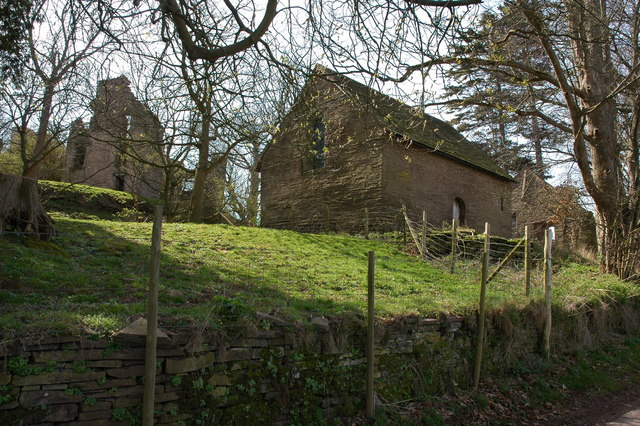
- Urishay Castle Chapel with the castle remains to the left

- Location in Herefordshire
- 52.0328°N 2.9883°W
- Location: Near Peterchurch, Herefordshire, England

History
- Built: 12th century

Site notes
- Restored: 1911, 1982–84
- Governing body: Friends of Friendless Churches

Listed Building – Grade II*
- Designated: 17 January 1949

Urishay Castle Chapel is a redundant chapel to the north of Urishay Castle, some 2.5 kilometres (2 mi) west of the village of Peterchurch in Herefordshire, England (grid reference SO326376). It is recorded in the National Heritage List for England as a designated Grade II* listed building, and is under the care of the Friends of Friendless Churches. The chapel is a Scheduled Monument, and is on the Heritage at Risk Register.

== History ==
The chapel is built in the bailey of Urishay Castle. It is the earliest purpose-built chapel to a castle in Herefordshire. The nave dates from the early 12th century, and an extension forming the chancel was added in the late 12th century. Alterations were made to the chapel in the 16th and 17th centuries. In later years it had a number of uses, including being a blacksmith's forge, a carpenter's shop and a dog kennel.

By the early part of the 20th century it was a ruin. Following a report by the Society for the Protection of Ancient Buildings some work was carried out and it was re-dedicated for public worship on 29 June 1914. However it was closed again in 1923. By 1949 it was again a ruin, with holes in the roof and leaning walls. In 1978 it was vested in the charity the Friends of Friendless Churches, its freehold being dated 26 July 1978. The charity carried out a programme of repairs which were completed in 2009, including rebuilding much of the walling, but the building is still only partly roofed. In 1914 traces of wall paintings were reported, but these have completely disappeared. In the 1980s evidence was found of a number of infant burials, although there have never been any adult burials in the chapel.

== Architecture ==
The chapel is constructed in stone rubble with a stone slate roof. It is in two cells, one forming the nave and the other the chancel, each of which is of similar width; the chapel is otherwise featureless. A rendered concrete block wall dating from the 1980s stands about 1 metre (3 ft) to the west of the chancel arch. In the north wall of the chancel are two doors, one added in the 20th century, and the other being an original priest's door with a semicircular head. In the north wall are two windows, one being small with a semicircular head, and the other larger with a square head, probably dating from the 17th century. The east wall contains a window with a four-centred head, probably from the early 16th century. In the north wall of the nave is a narrow square-headed window, and in the south wall is a window with a pointed head and a doorway with a semicircular head. The west wall contains two single-light windows at different heights. The fittings still present in the interior are an altar slab with five consecration crosses, and the base of a 19th-century font.
