= Pontrilas Court =

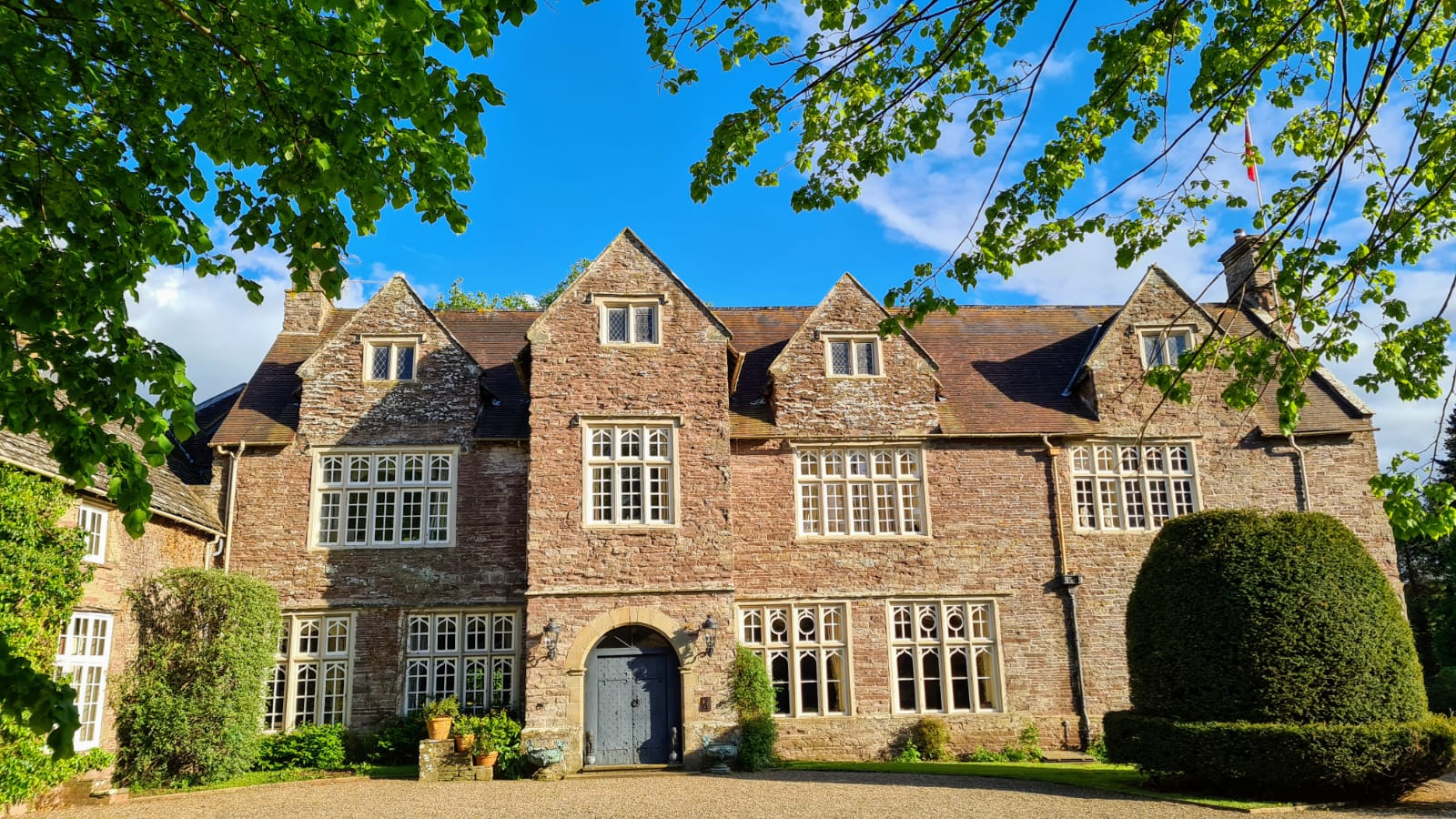
- Location: Pontrilas, Herefordshire
- Coordinates: 51.9427°N 2.8805°W
- Built: 1630-40
- Website: https://pontrilascourt.com

Pontrilas Court situated at the west end of the village Pontrilas in Herefordshire is a large stone Grade II* listed mansion and is marked on the 1904 Ordnance Survey map illustration.

== History ==
The Baskerville family of Eardisley came to Pontrilas and built Pontrilas Court in between 1630-40. Baskerville and Jackson and Shiffner families were associated with Pontrilas for 150 years they were related to each other by marriage. Pontrilas Court was once part of a larger estate amounting to more than 1,330 acres in five Herefordshire parishes which included Pontrilas Farm, Mill and Forge together with other houses, farms and land.

The property has been known from 1881 as Pontrilas Court but previously known as ‘the mansion house’ and ‘Pontrilas House’. Until 1840, when it was split into smaller holdings it was part of a larger estate with land in five Herefordshire parishes. It was put up for sale again in 1919.

== Architecture ==
RCHME – the forerunner to English Heritage described the house as sandstone rubble with ashlar dressings having an L-shaped plan with C20 tiled roof and having south-west and north-west wing. The SW wing was built c1630-40, which included great hall, the main entrance, and rooms either side.

== See also ==
- Pontrilas
- Kentchurch Court
