= Staplow =

English village

- Village
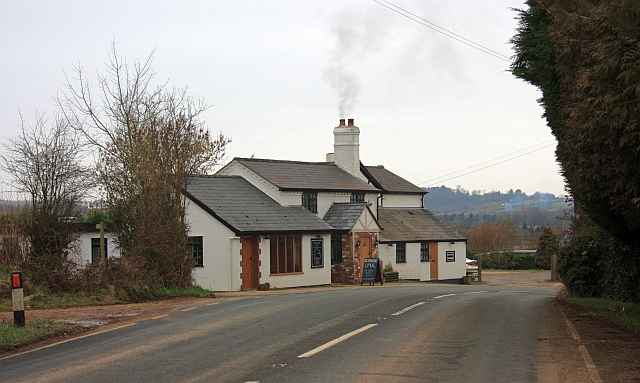
- The Oak Inn in Staplow.

- Location within the United Kingdom
- OS grid reference: SO 69102 41487
- Shire county: Herefordshire
- Country: England
- Sovereign state: United Kingdom
- Post town: LEDBURY
- Postcode district: HR8

Staplow (/ˈstæploʊ/) is a village in Herefordshire, approximately 2 miles (3.2 km) north of Ledbury. It is primarily known for its only pub, The Oak Inn, which was built in the 17th century. The main road that runs through the village is the B4214 (Bromyard Road), connecting it to Ledbury as well as Bromyard, in the north of Herefordshire. The village contains multiple Grade II listed buildings, including Woodhouse Farmhouse and Prior's Court. The River Leadon runs to the east of the village. Additionally, the Hereford and Gloucester Canal ran through the village until its eventual disuse in the 1900s.
