= Moreton Jeffries =

Village in Herefordshire, England

Coordinates: 52.13°N 02.58°W

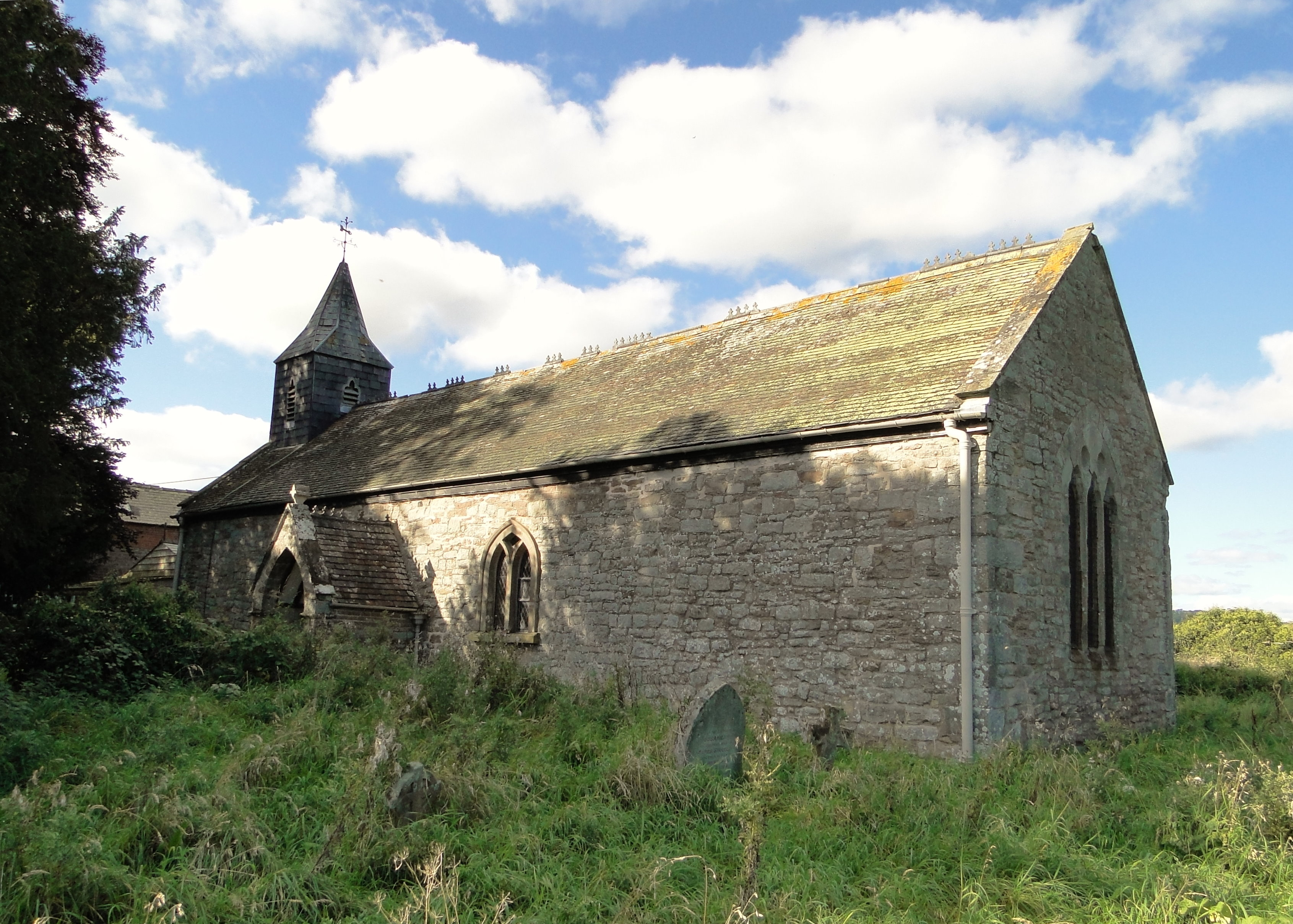
- Moreton Jeffries Church

- Location within Herefordshire
- Population: 14 (2001 census)
- OS grid reference: SO 603 485
- Civil parish: Moreton Jeffries
- Unitary authority: County of Herefordshire
- Ceremonial county: Herefordshire
- Region: West Midlands
- Country: England
- Sovereign state: United Kingdom
- Post town: BROMYARD
- Postcode district: HR1
- Dialling code: 01432
- Police: West Mercia
- Fire: Hereford and Worcester
- Ambulance: West Midlands
- UK Parliament: North Herefordshire

Moreton Jeffries (or Moreton Jefferies) is a village and civil parish in the county of Herefordshire, England. It is situated off the A465 between Stoke Lacy and Burley Gate, approximately 8.5 miles (13.7 km) north-east of Hereford. In 2001 the parish had a population of 14. It has a medieval church, which has been designated by English Heritage as a Grade II* listed building, and is under the care of the Churches Conservation Trust. In the Domesday Book, it was listed as being in the Radlow Hundred. Henry 'Harry' Morgan, founder of the Morgan Motor Company, was born in Moreton Jeffries Rectory in 1881. There are timber merchants in the hamlet. Some time between 1961 and 1965 the parish was renamed from "Moreton Jeffreys" to "Moreton Jeffries".
