= Longworth Roman Catholic Chapel =

Coordinates: 52.0620°N 2.6308°W

- Roman Catholic Church of St James, Bartestree
- Location in Herefordshire
- OS grid reference: SO 568 406
- Location: Bartestree, Herefordshire
- Country: England
- Denomination: Roman Catholic
- Website: Longworth Chapel

Architecture
- Functional status: Redundant
- Heritage designation: Grade II*
- Designated: 11 October 1985
- Architect: E. W. Pugin (?)
- Architectural type: Chapel
- Style: Gothic, Gothic Revival

Specifications
- Materials: Sandstone, tiled roof

Longworth Roman Catholic Chapel is a redundant chapel in the village of Bartestree, Herefordshire, England, standing adjacent to the former Convent of Our Lady of Charity and Refuge. It is recorded in the National Heritage List for England as a designated Grade II* listed building, and is owned by the Historic Chapels Trust.

== Early history ==
The chapel has been on its present site since 1869–70. It was originally the private chapel of the manor house at nearby Old Longworth that was probably built in about 1390. After the Reformation it became redundant, and during the 17th century it was being used for agricultural purposes, including cider making. In the middle of the 19th century the manor house and chapel were owned by Robert Biddulph Phillips. He became a convert to Catholicism and decided to restore the chapel, which was carried out in 1851. In 1863 he founded the Convent of Our Lady of Charity and Refuge in Bartestree for his daughter. When he died in 1864 he was buried in the chapel, but in his will he stipulated that the chapel should be moved to stand adjacent to the convent. This was carried out in 1869–70, and the architect responsible for supervising the move and restoring the chapel to its present form was almost certainly E. W. Pugin, who had designed the convent.

== Architecture ==
=== Exterior ===
The chapel is constructed in buff and pink sandstone with a tiled roof. It consists of a single cell and is oriented north-south. The entrance is through a porch in the north end, its door facing east, and the west wall is attached to the convent. At the corner of the building are diagonal buttresses. Much of the material incorporated in the fabric of the reconstructed chapel has been re-used from the medieval chapel. Most of the windows and the doorway are from the original chapel and are in late Decorated or early Perpendicular style. However evidence, including before-and-after photographs, show that the form of the present chapel differs from the original; it was not merely dismantled and reconstructed on the new site. The present chapel has been described as "a Victorian interpretation of a medieval building using high quality medieval material".

=== Interior ===
The single-cell interior contains a small chancel and a recess in the west wall leading into the convent. The roofs of the chancel and the rest of the chapel have different forms of construction. The stone altar and reredos are thought to have been designed by Pugin. The altar has statues in niches of Saint Francis de Sales, Saint Jean Frances de Chantal, Saint Teresa, Saint Anne, and another, unidentified saint. The reredos contains six niches containing statues of angels. In the east wall are two piscinas. The chapel contains a number of memorials to the Phillips family. In the south window is stained glass by Hardman & Co., currently removed for safe-keeping pending restoration.

== Associated buildings ==
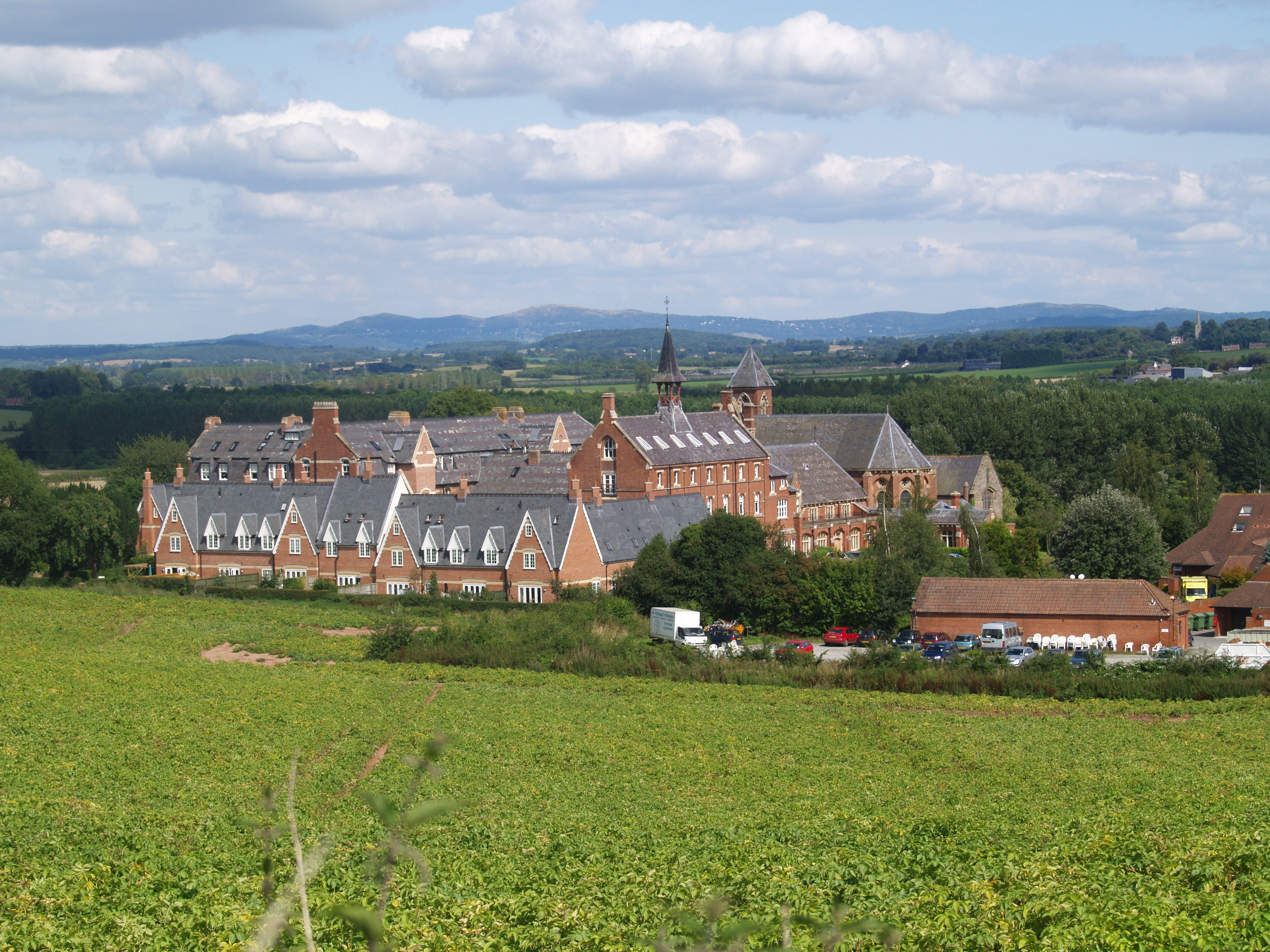
Bartestree Convent

The adjacent convent together with its presbytery are listed at Grade II.

== Recent history ==
After years of abandonment, the convent was finally converted into residential units and the nuns chapel broken up into flats. The adjoining chapel was acquired in a derelict state by the Historic Chapels Trust who have negotiated grant of £143,000 from English Heritage and raised additional donations for the first phase of repairs, completed in 2011. These have rendered the chapel secure and weathertight. The chapel is available for hire for concerts, meetings and small scale events during the warmer months and occasional services are held. Donations and grants are being sought for the £250,000 needed to complete the restoration. A local committee has been created to help manage the chapel day to day and to explore new uses for the space.

== See also ==
- List of chapels preserved by the Historic Chapels Trust
