= Lugwardine =

Village in Herefordshire, England

Coordinates: 52.066°N 2.66°W

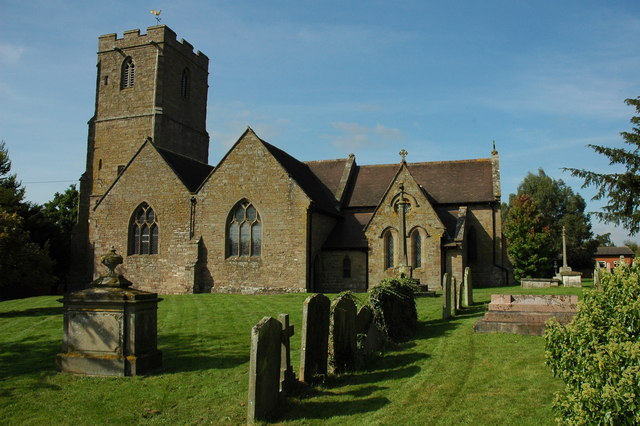
- St Peter's Church

- Location within Herefordshire
- Population: 1,721 (2011 Census)
- Unitary authority: Herefordshire
- Shire county: Herefordshire
- Region: West Midlands
- Country: England
- Sovereign state: United Kingdom
- Post town: Hereford
- Postcode district: HR1
- Police: West Mercia
- Fire: Hereford and Worcester
- Ambulance: West Midlands
- UK Parliament: North Herefordshire

Lugwardine is a village and civil parish in Herefordshire, England, to the east of Hereford. It lies on the north-east bank of the River Lugg, which gives the village its name. The population of the civil parish taken at the 2011 Census was 1,721.

The place-name 'Lugwardine' is first attested in the Domesday Book of 1086, where it appears as Lucvordine. It appears as Lugwurthin in the Pipe Rolls of 1168. The name means 'enclosure or homestead on the (river) Lugg'.

The village lies on the A438 road; Lugwardine Bridge takes this road across the Lugg. There is a public house in the village called The Crown and Anchor.

St Mary's Roman Catholic High School is in the village. There is also a primary school, shared with neighbouring Bartestree.

== Parish ==
The parish contains the village of Lugwardine, and the hamlets of:

- Hagley – on the A438 to the east of Lugwardine, now part of the village of Bartestree.
- Tidnor – a very small place, to the south-east of Lugwardine; there are several orchards at Tidnor Wood.
- Longworth – to the south-east of Lugwardine, slightly further than Tidnor; Longworth Hall is a notable listed building.

Lugwardine, Hagley and Bartestree form a continuous linear settlement along the A438 road.

=== Parish council ===
The parish council covers both Lugwardine and the neighbouring parish of Bartestree.

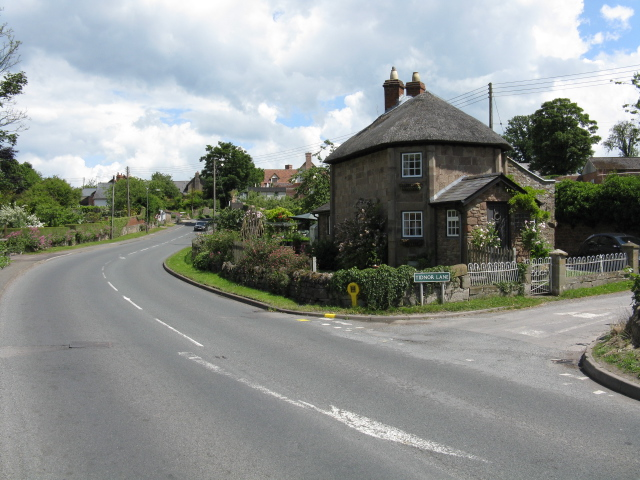
The A438 road entering the western end of the village, with Tidnor Lane to the right.
