= Bartestree =

Village in Herefordshire, England

Coordinates: 52.06834°N 2.63747°W

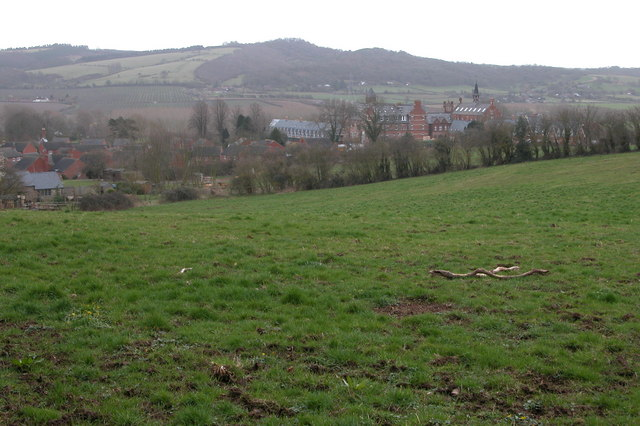
Bartestree Convent

Bartestree is a village and civil parish in Herefordshire, England, 7 km (4.3 mi) east of Hereford on the A438 road. The population of the civil parish at the 2011 census was 330.

== History ==
The name is thought to be derived from the Old English Beorhtwald's tree.

The Convent of Our Lady of Charity & Refuge was founded in 1863 and paid for by Robert Biddulph Phillips of Longworth. Its red-brick building was designed by Edward Pugin south east of the main village. The convent of Sisters of Our Lady of Charity of the Refuge received girls placed into their care by social services and predecessor organisations and closed in 1992 following withdrawal of referrals by Herefordshire County Council and the consequent loss of income from the on-site laundry, where the girls worked. The property stood empty and became badly vandalised until conversion to residential apartments, now renamed Frome Court. The relocated medieval Longworth Roman Catholic Chapel alongside is in the care of the Historic Chapels Trust.

In 1984, St Michael's Hospice, the only purpose-built hospice in Herefordshire, was built on land formerly owned by Bartestree Convent and in 2014 is completing a major redevelopment.

== Community ==
Bartestree, Hagley and Lugwardine effectively form a continuous linear settlement along the A438 road. A sizeable part of the modern-day village lies in Lugwardine civil parish. Large commercial orchards exist just to the northeast of the village, at Pomona Farm.

There is a public house now called The Godwins, converted to a pub in 1954 (as the New Inn) from the residence of William Godwin, local brick and tile manufacturer who displayed many of his wares in his house.

Bartestree has a cricket club and a football club.

The parish council covers both Bartestree and the neighbouring parish of Lugwardine.
