= List of works by Glyn Philpot =

Glyn Warren Philpot RA (5 October 1884 – 16 December 1937) was an English painter and sculptor, best known for his portraits of contemporary figures such as Siegfried Sassoon and Vladimir Rosing.

== Gallery ==
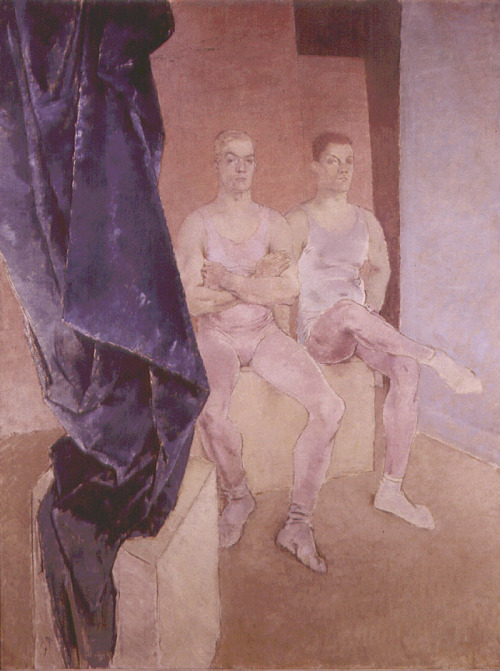
Acrobats Waiting to Rehearse, 1935

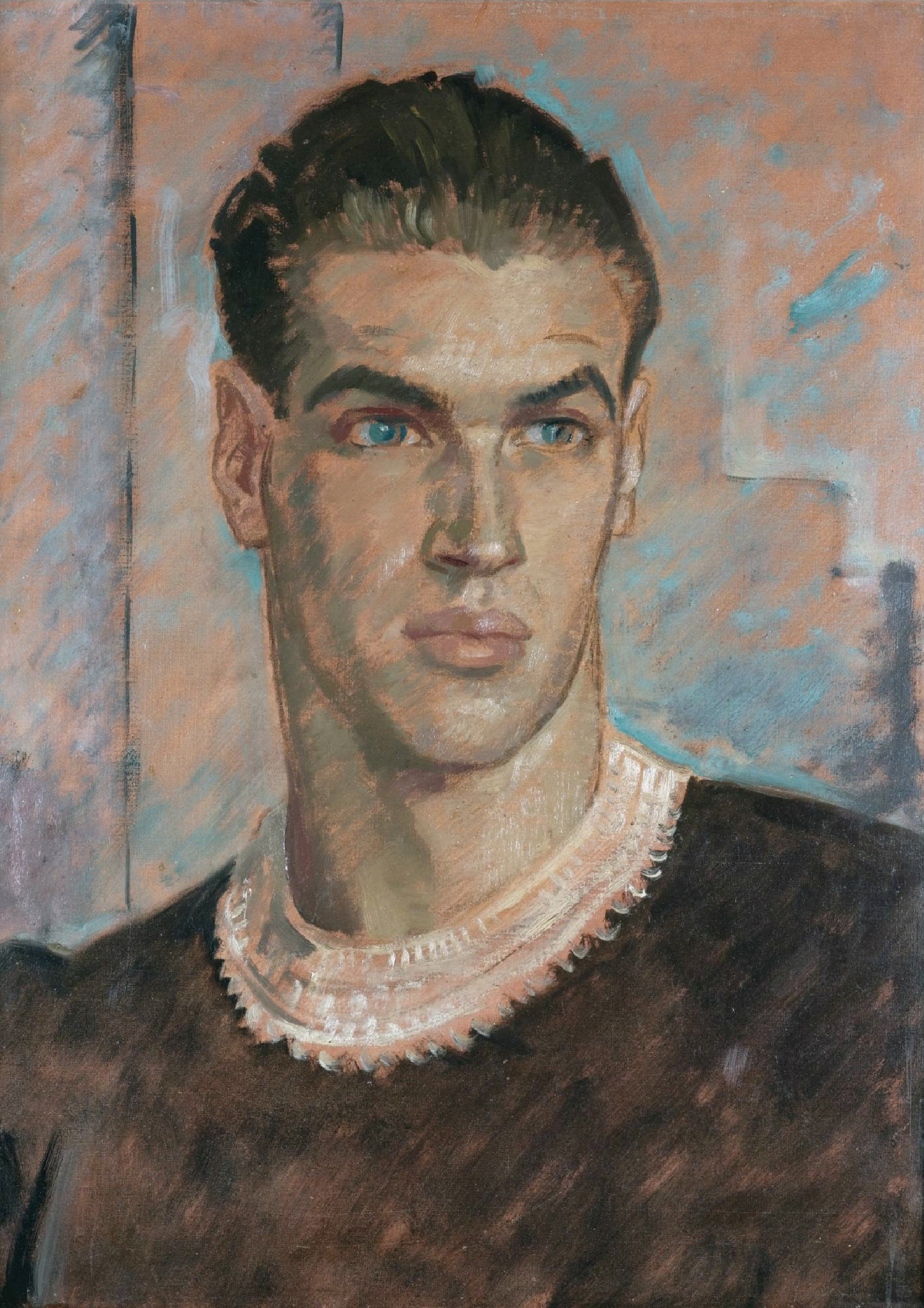
André Eglevsky, 1937

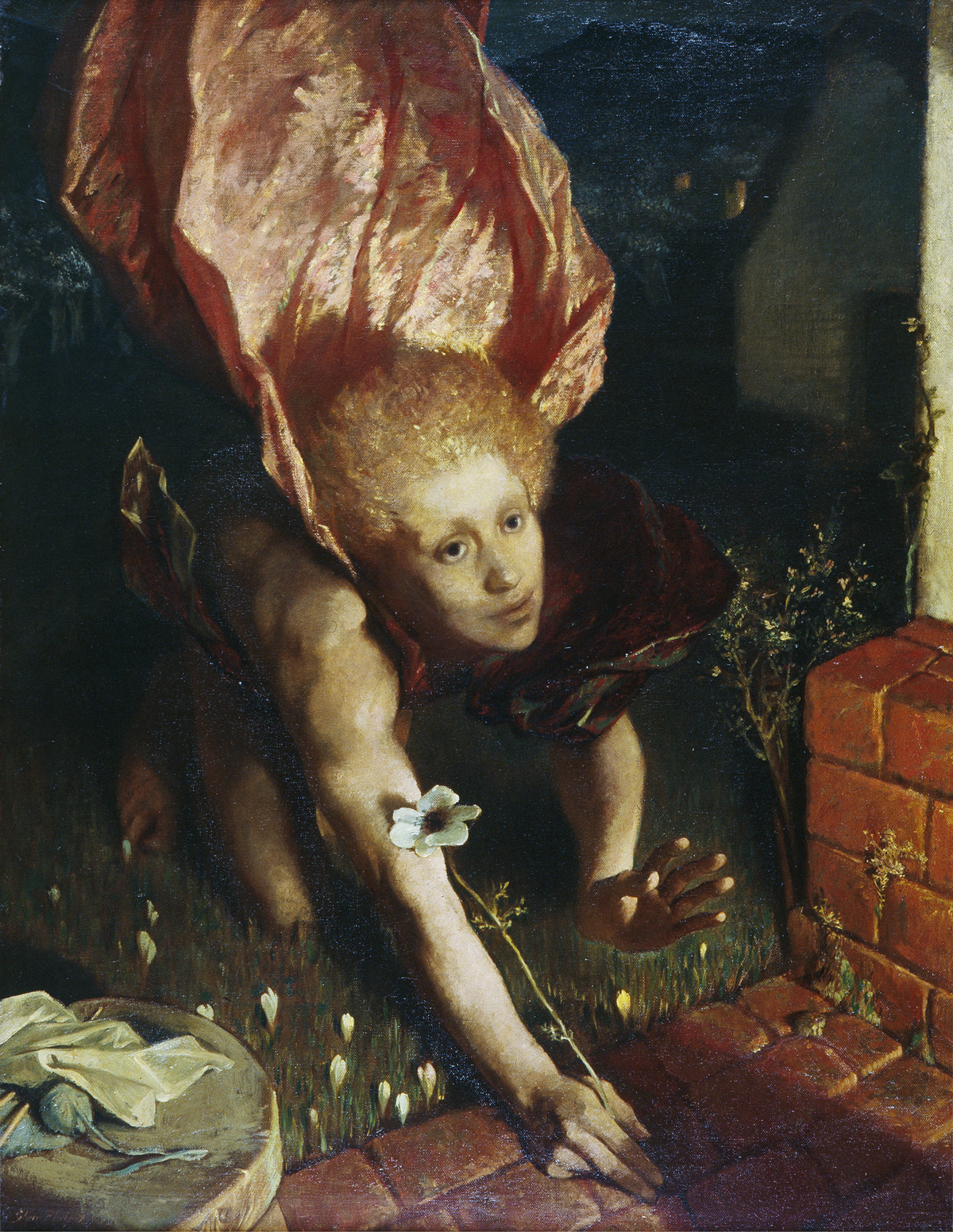
The Angel of the Annunciation, 1925

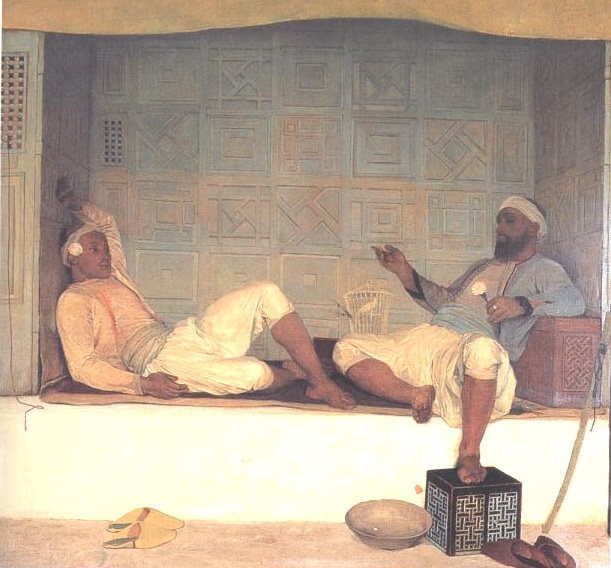
Apres-Midi Tunisien, ca 1922

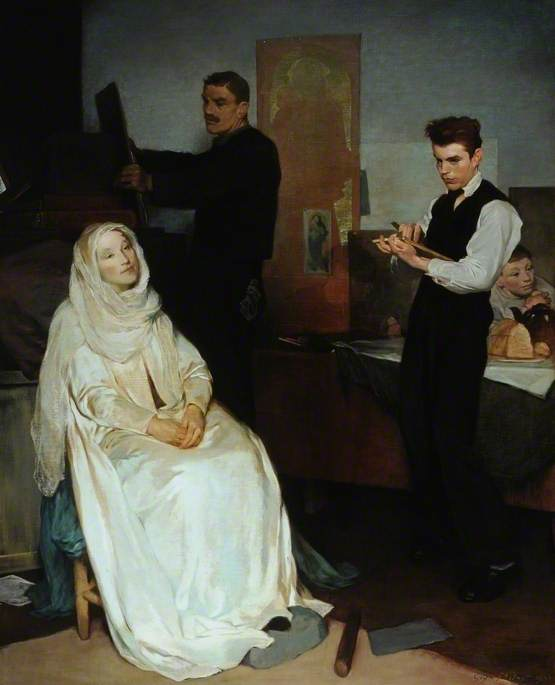
An Artist and His Family (The Rice Family), 1920

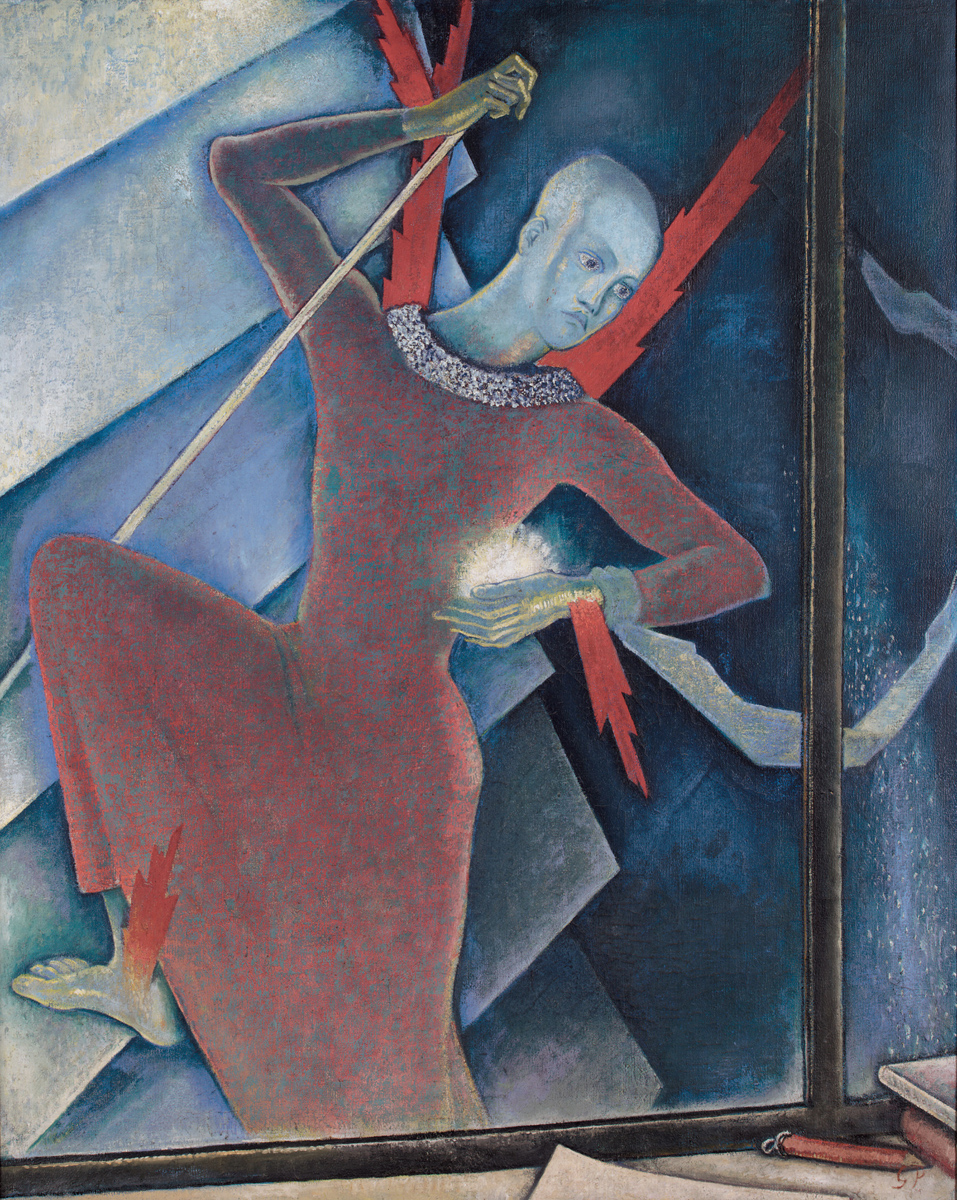
Ascending Angel, 1929

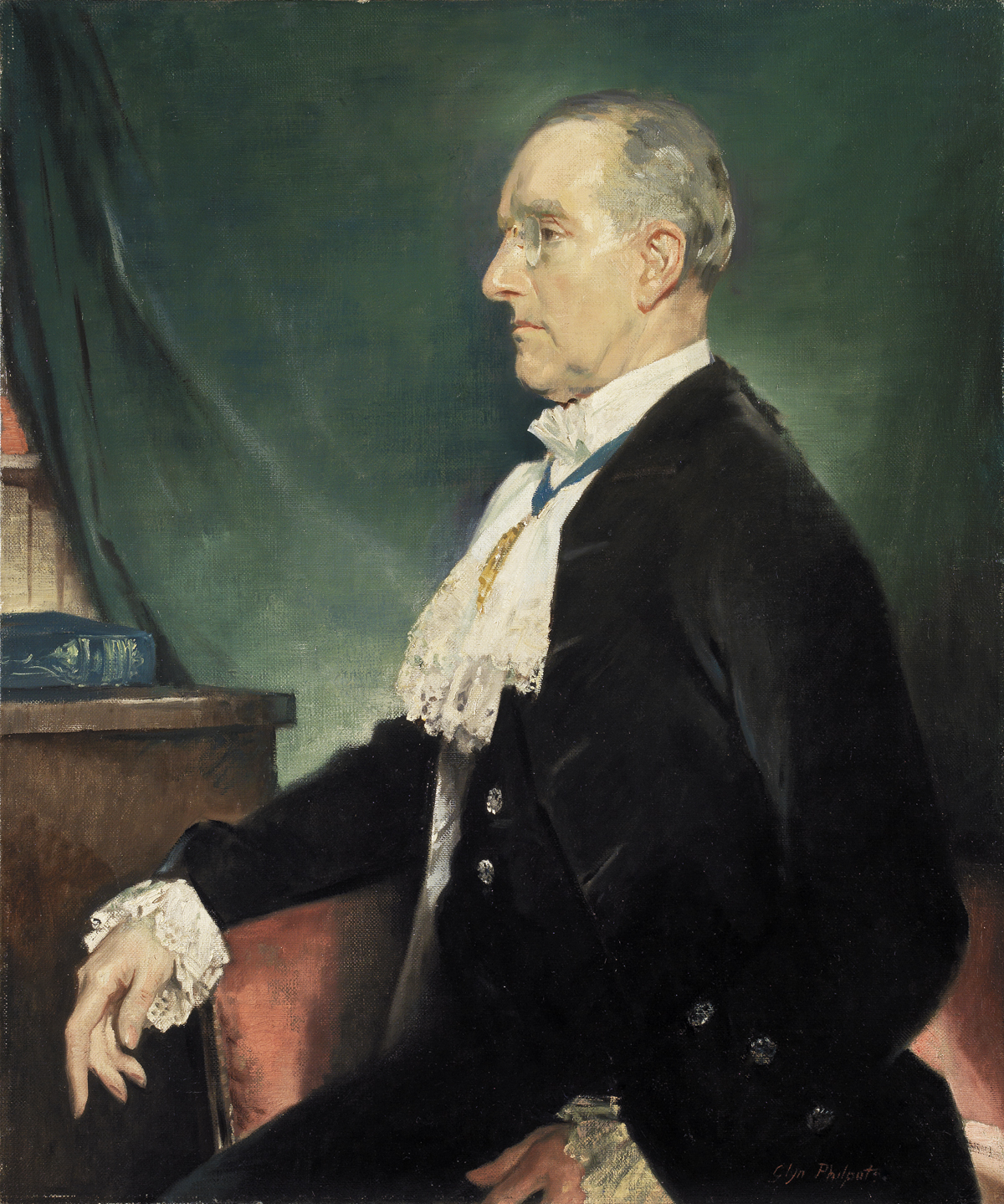
Sir Banister Fletcher, 1931

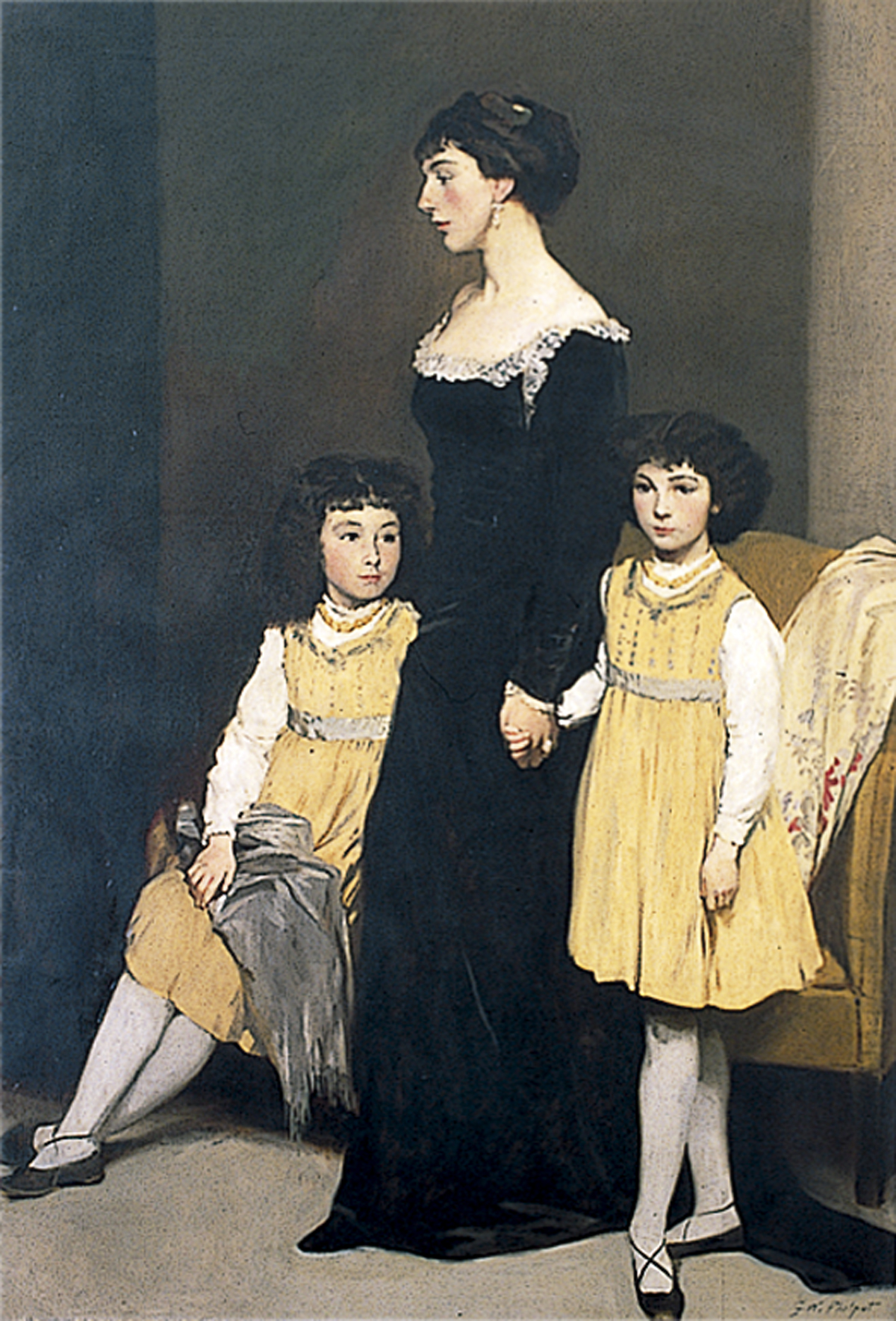
Mrs Basil Fothergill and Her Two Daughters, ca 1911

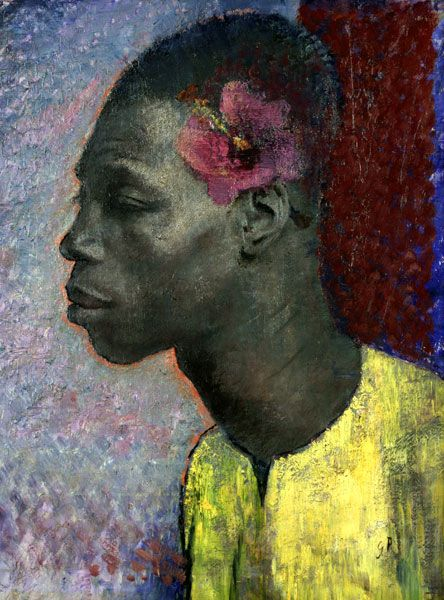
Black Man and Hibiscus, 1932

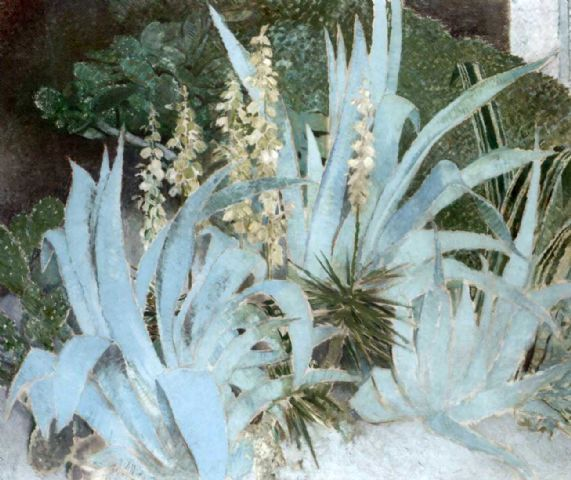
Cactus

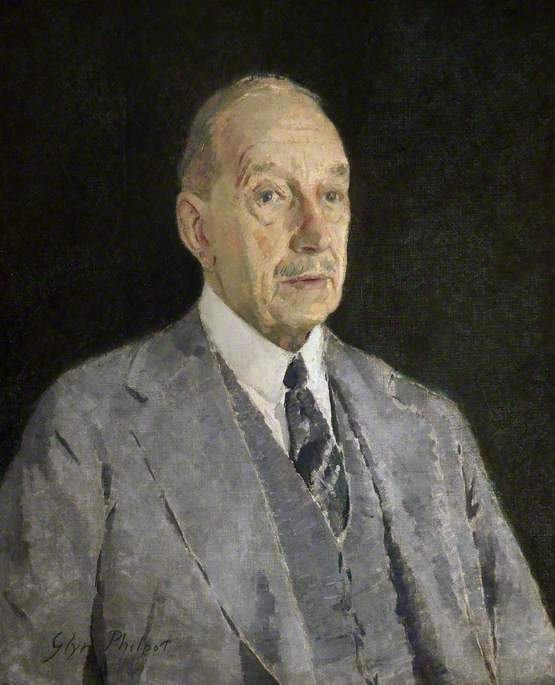
Cecil Higgins (1856-1941), 1935

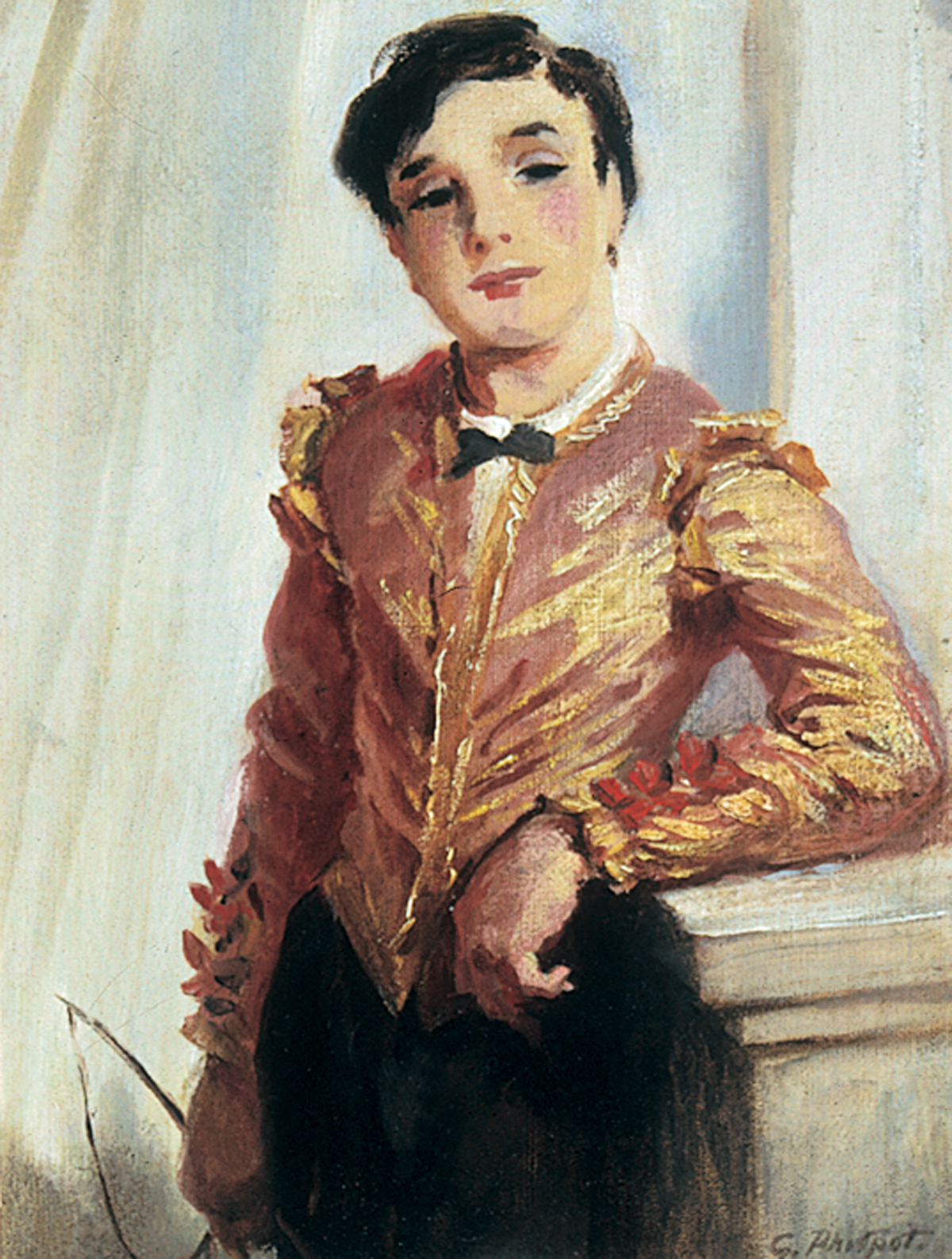
Circus Boy, ca 1911

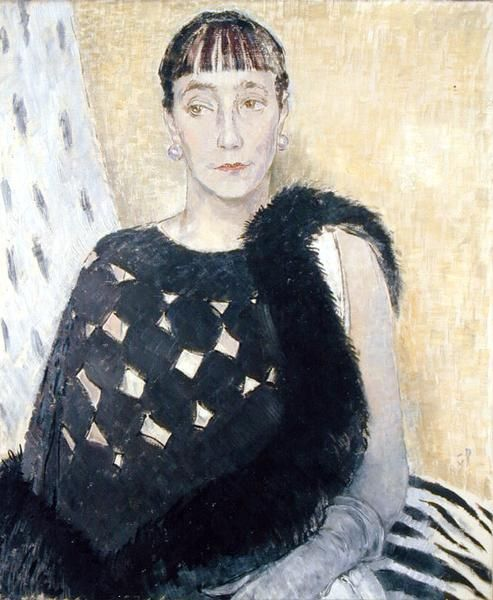
Mrs Clement Cross (Gertrude), the Artists Elder Sister, 1934

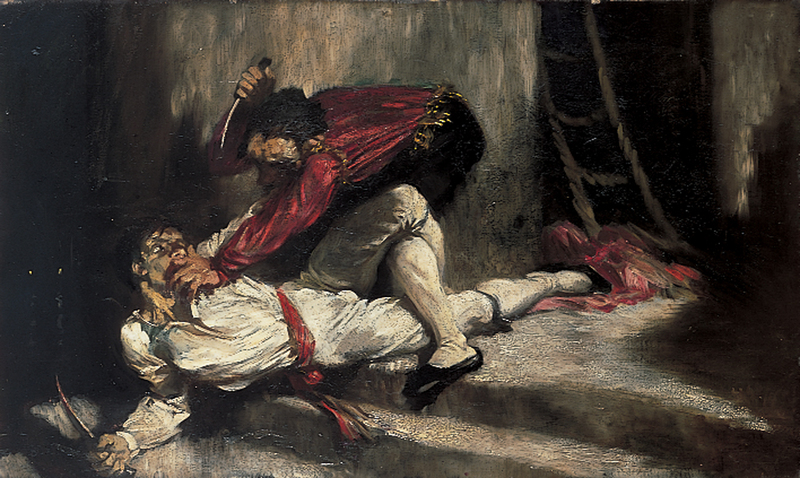
The Death Blow

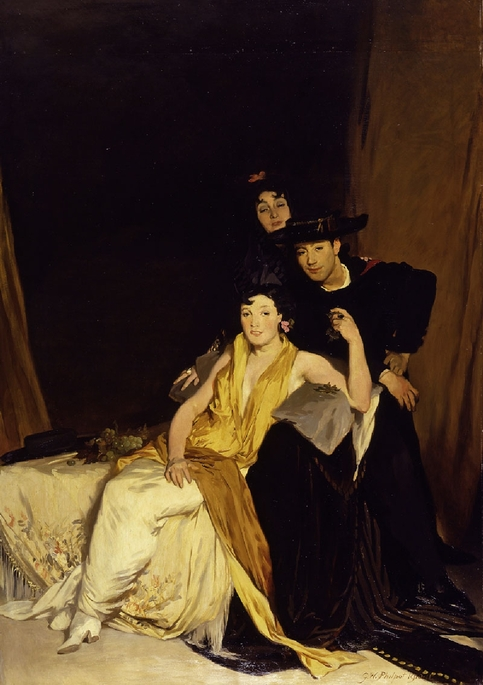
The Dog-Rose (La zarzarosa), 1910–11

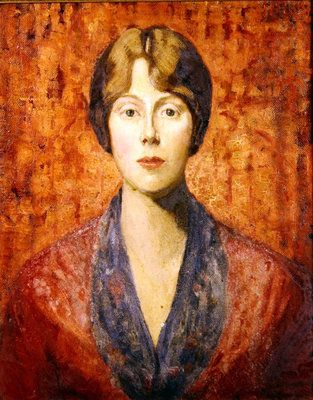
Dorothy Warren

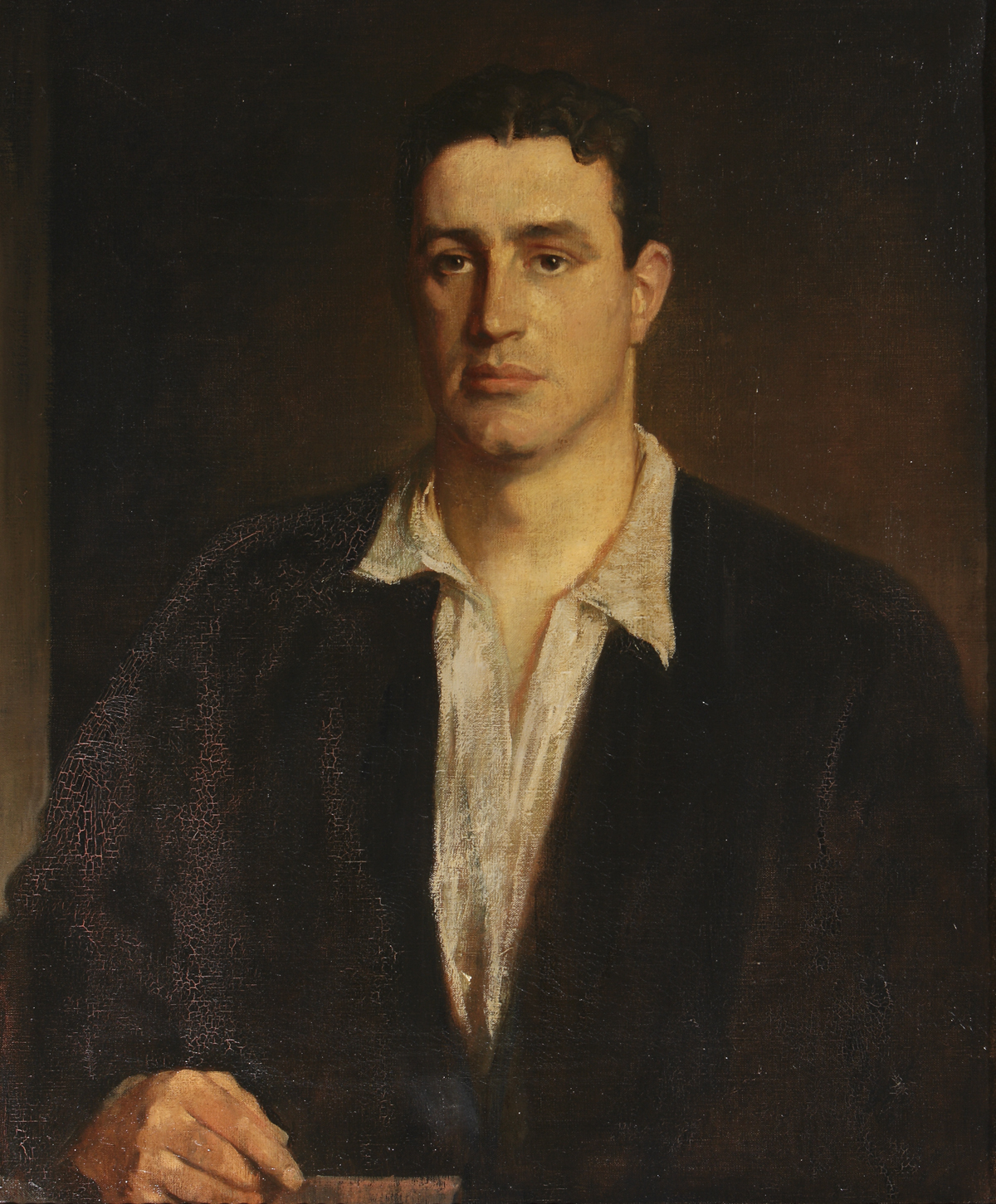
Sir Edward Charles Benthall (1893-1961), KCSI, as a Young Man, 1925

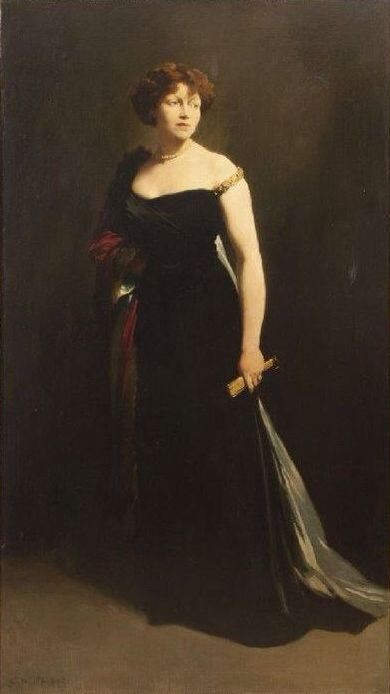
Mrs. Emile Mond (Angela Primrose Schweich-Mond, nee Goetze), 1910

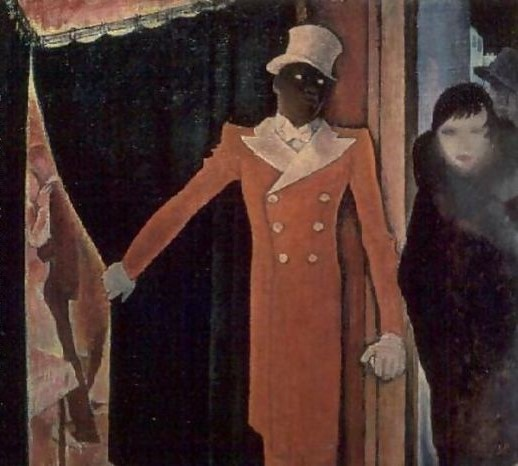
Entrance to the Tagada, 1931

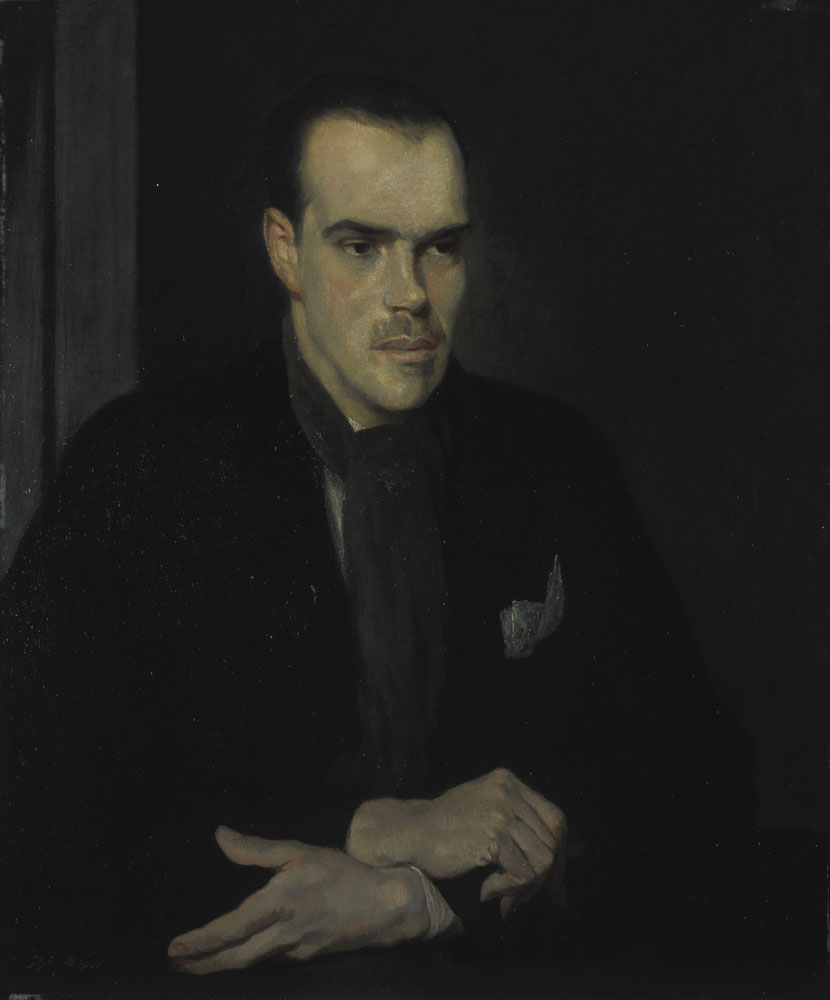
Euan Hillhouse Methven Cox

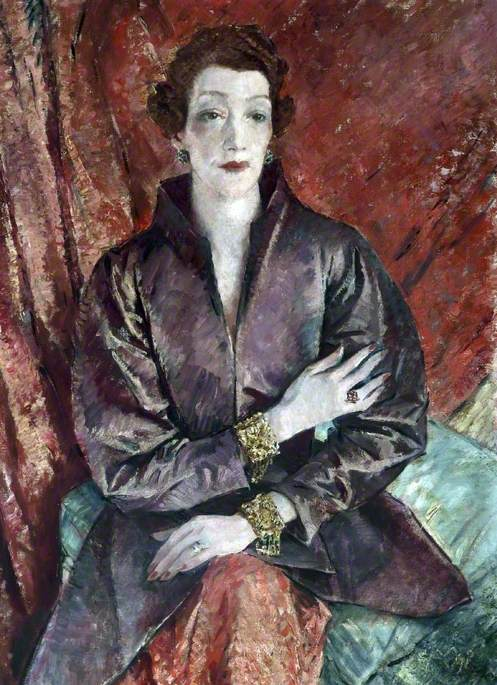
Mrs Eva Lubzhinsky Lutyens (Edwin Lutyens's daughter in law), 1935–37

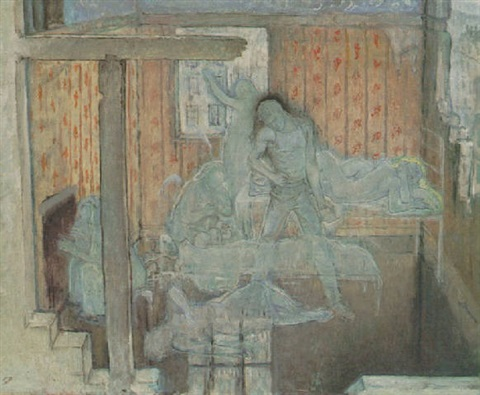
Former Tenants

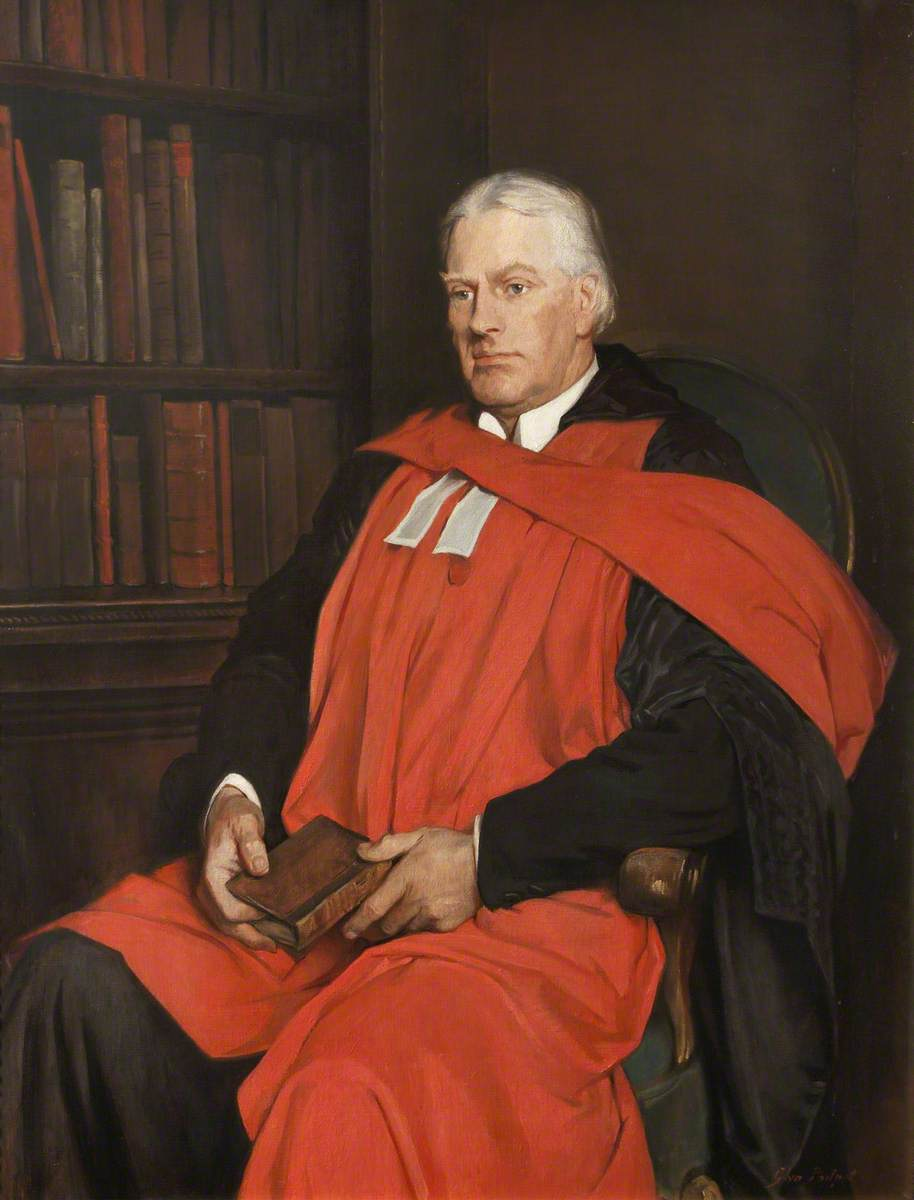
Francis William Pember

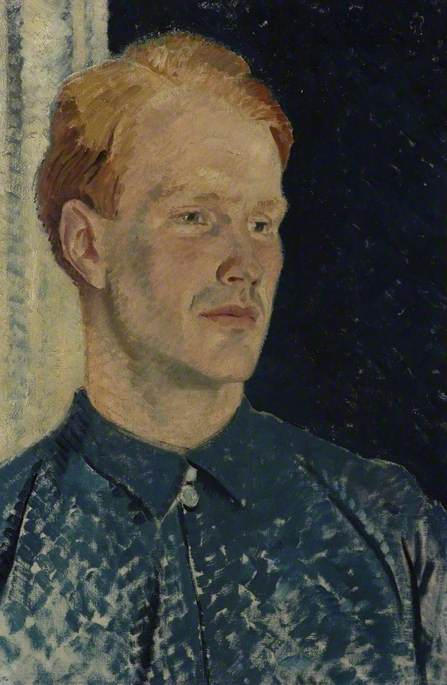
Frank Coombs, ca 1930

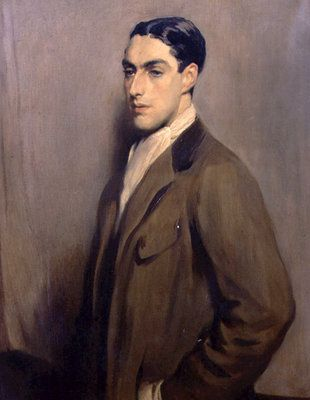
Sir Frank Meyer, 2nd Baronet, ca 1910

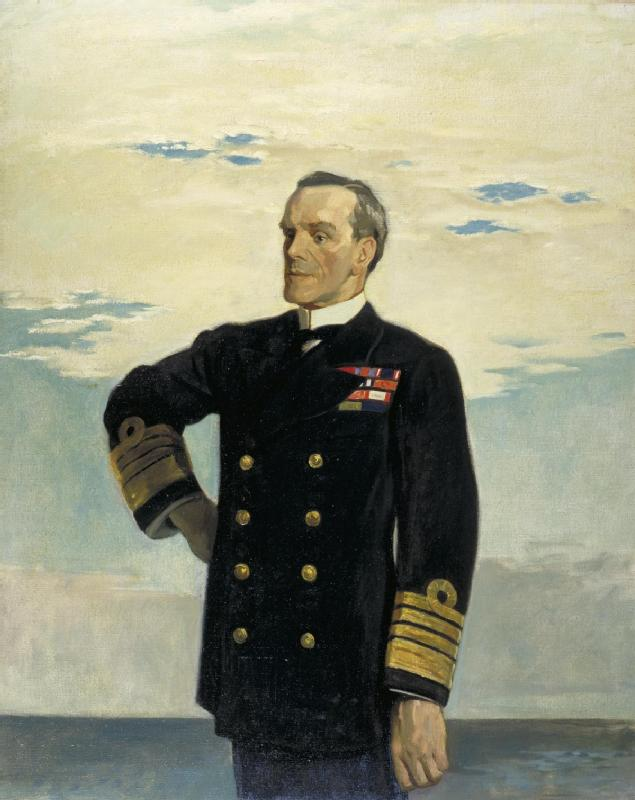
Frederick Charles Doveton Sturdee, 1918

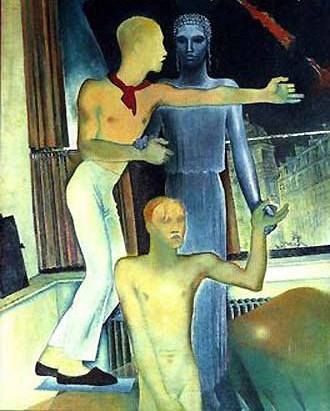
Fugue, 1931–32

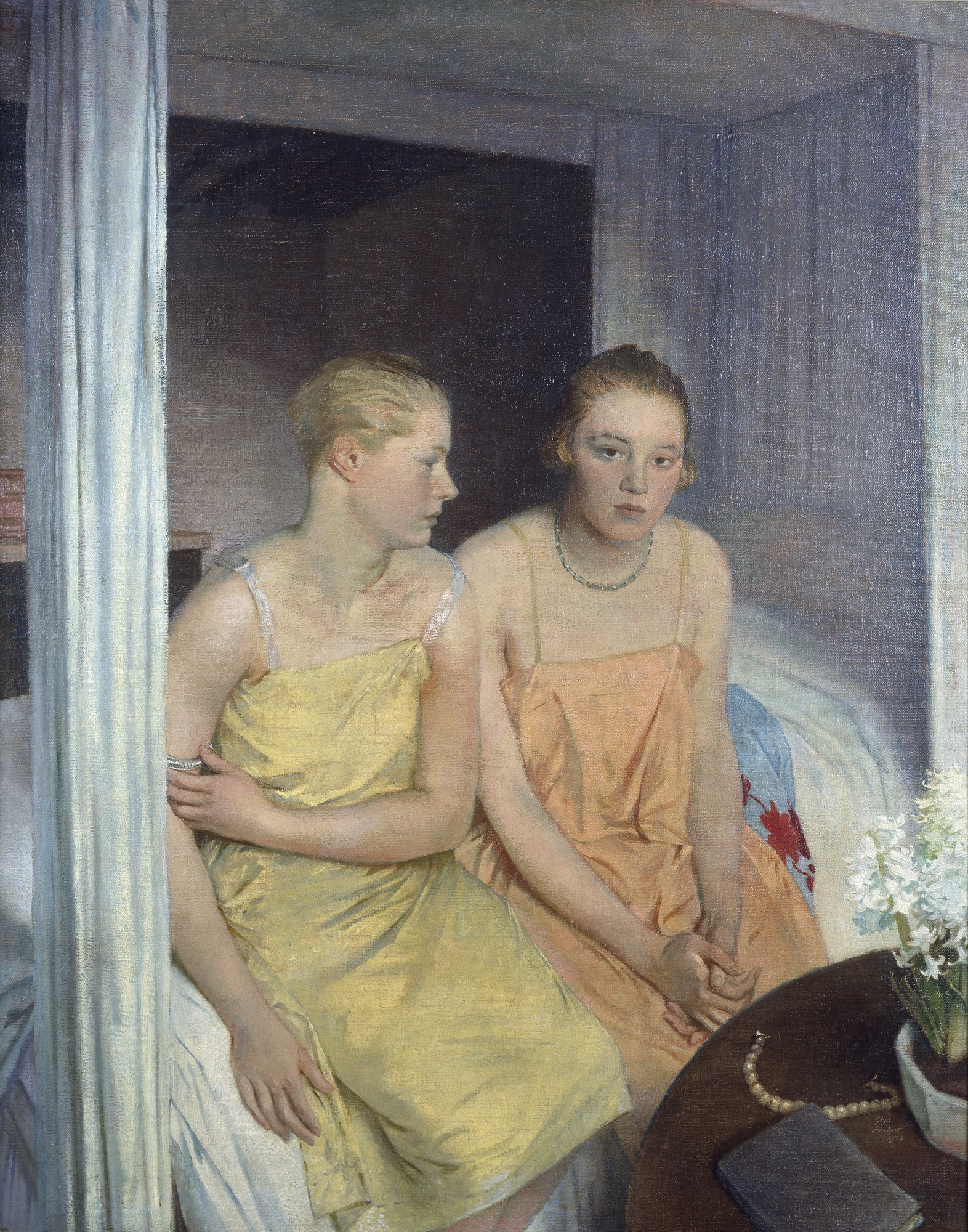
Gabrielle Cross and Rosemary

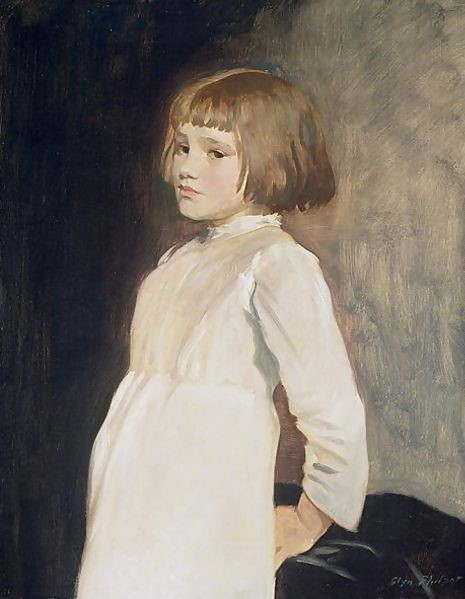
Gabrielle Cross, the Artists Niece, 1919

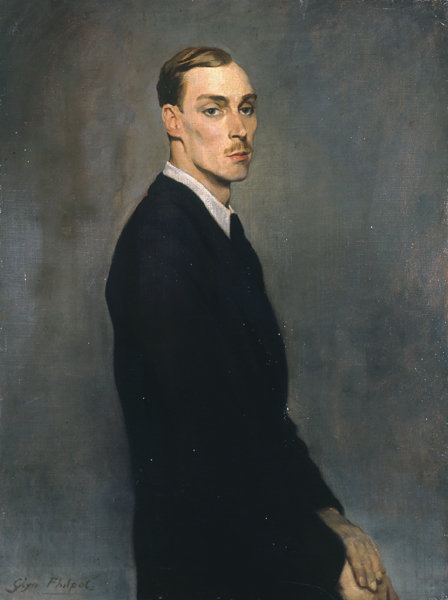
2nd Lieutenant Gerald Caldwell Siordet M.C. (1885-1917), Rifle Brigade 13th Battalion

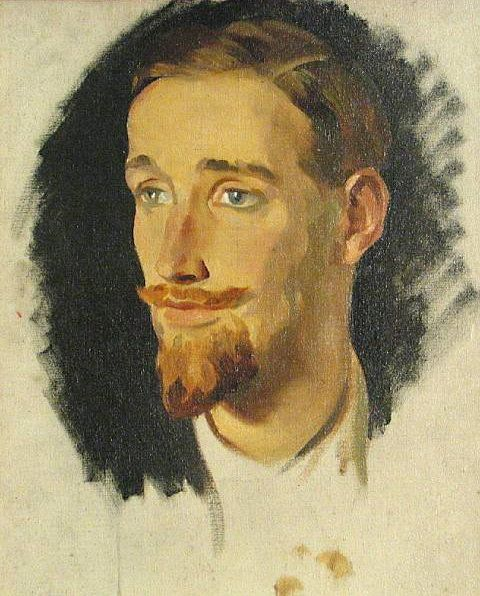
Gerald Heard

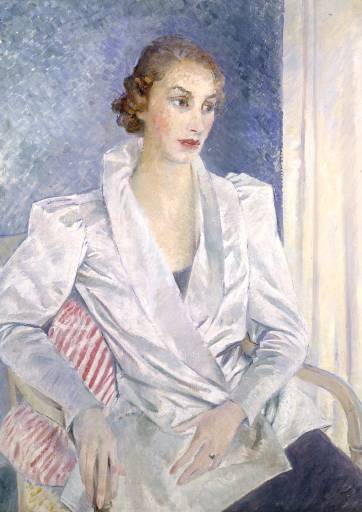
Mrs Gerard Simpson, 1937

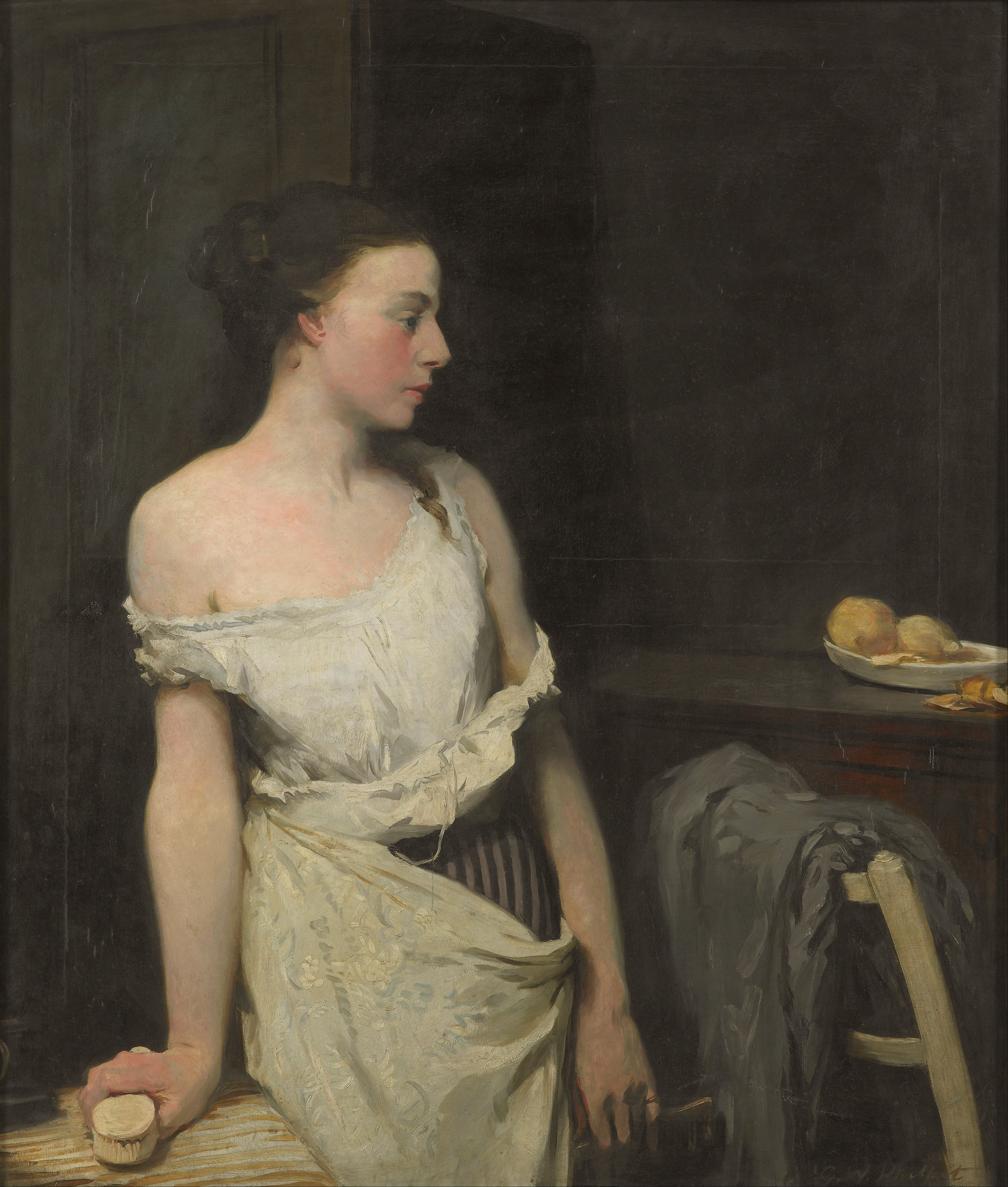
Girl at her toilet

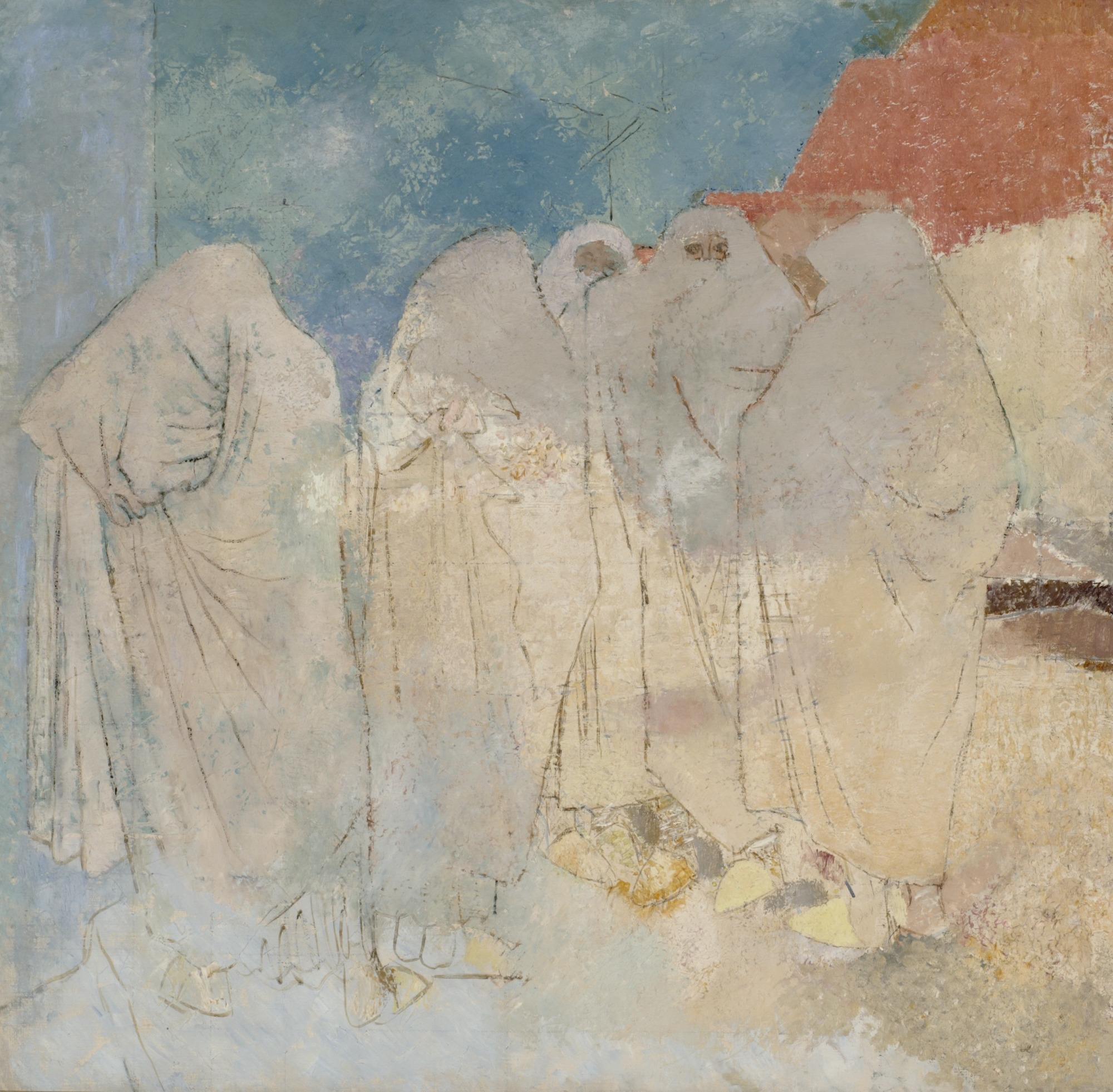
Group of Women, Marrakech, 1936

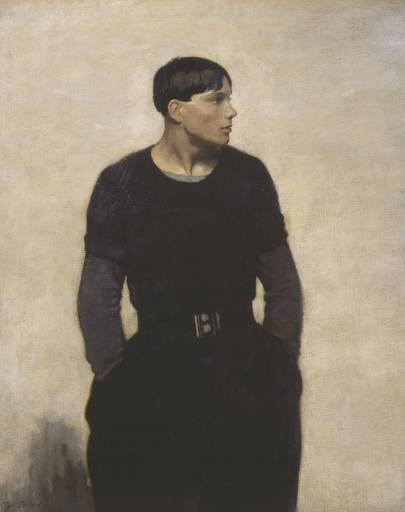
A Young Breton (Guillaume Rolland), 1917

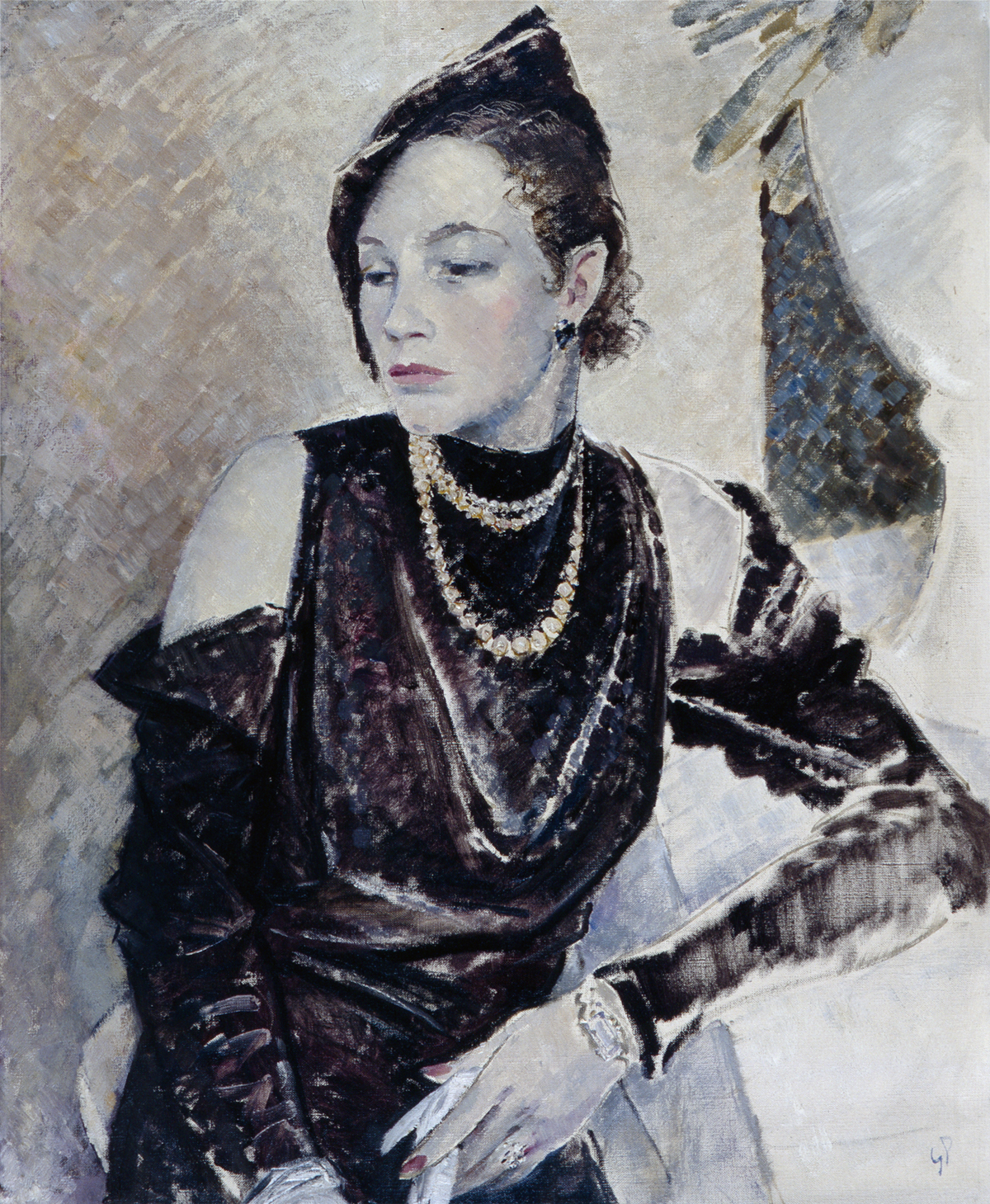
Miss Gwendoline Cleaver, 1933

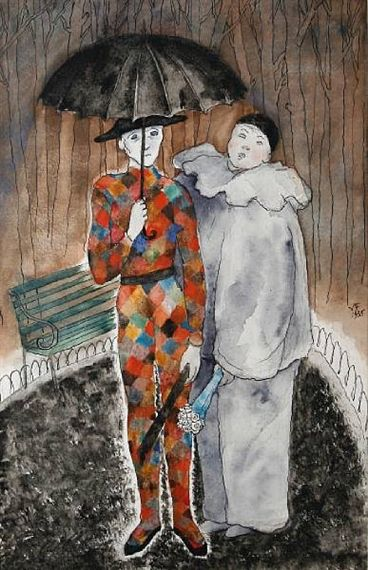
Harlequin and Pierrot in the Rain

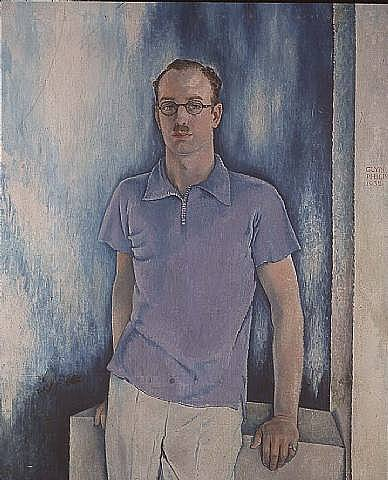
Henry Mond, 2nd Baron Melchett

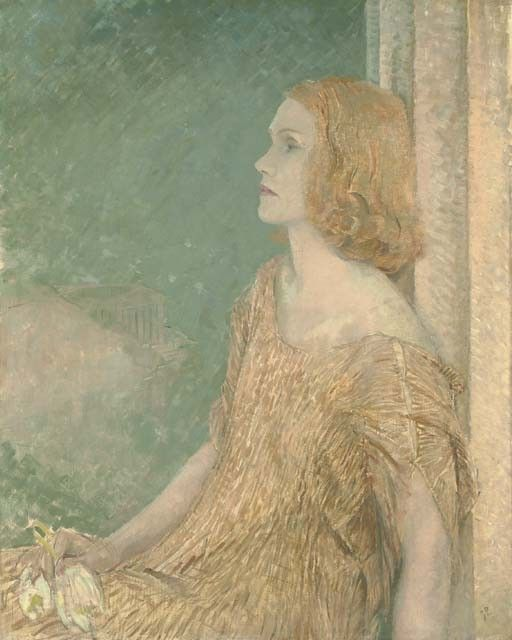
Lady Henry Mond, 2nd Baron Melchett (Amy Gwen Wilson Mond), 1935

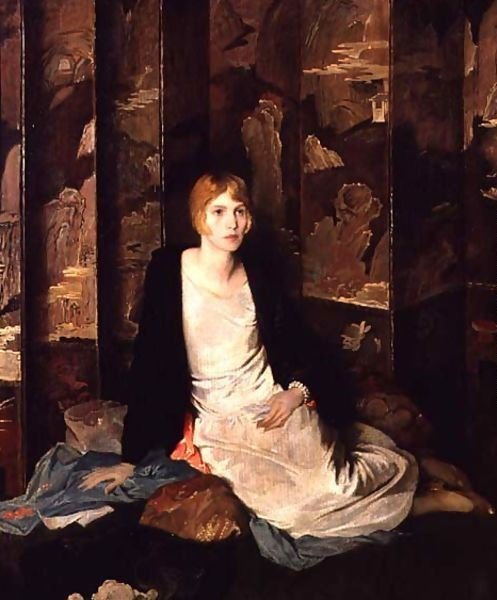
Mrs. Henry Mond, 2nd Baron Melchett (Amy Gwen Wilson Mond)

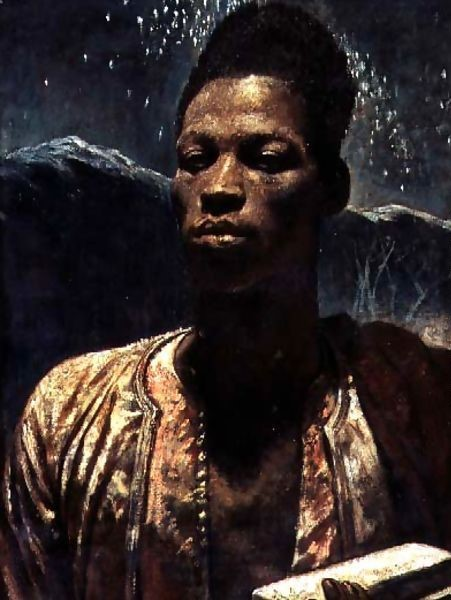
Balthazar (Henry Thomas), 1929

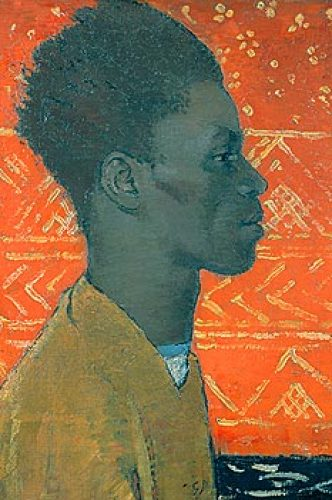
Henry Thomas, 1934–35

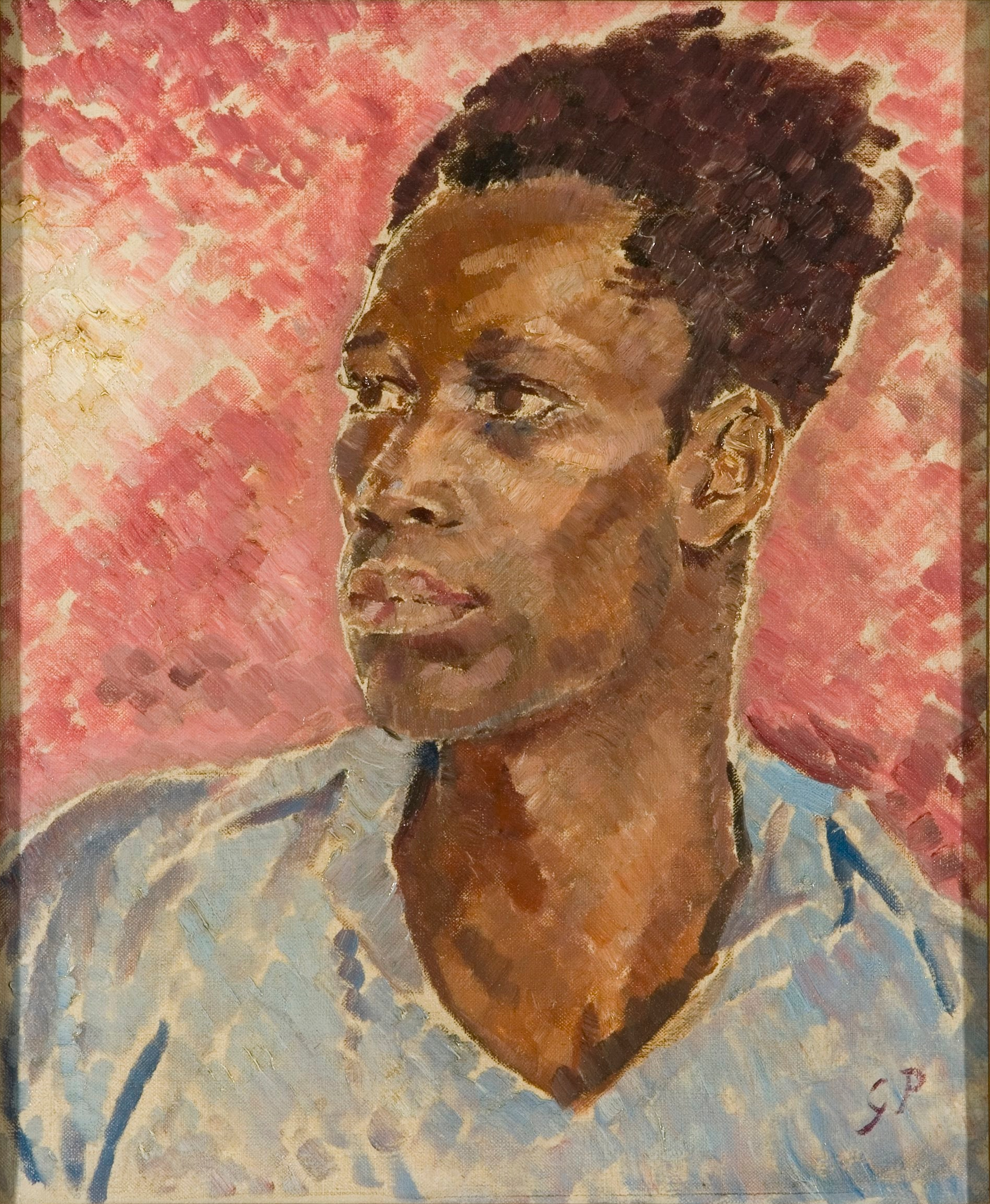
Head of a Negro (Henry Thomas), ca 1935

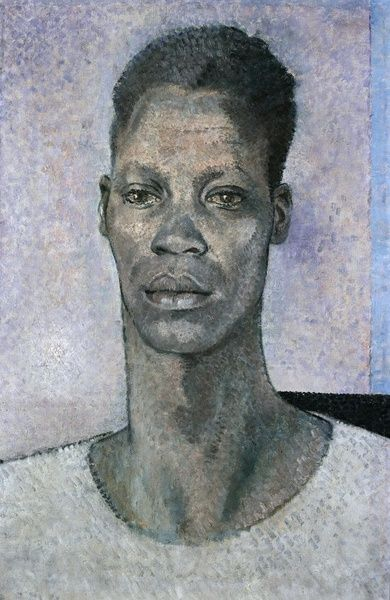
Head of Negro, Heroic scale (Henry Thomas), 1937

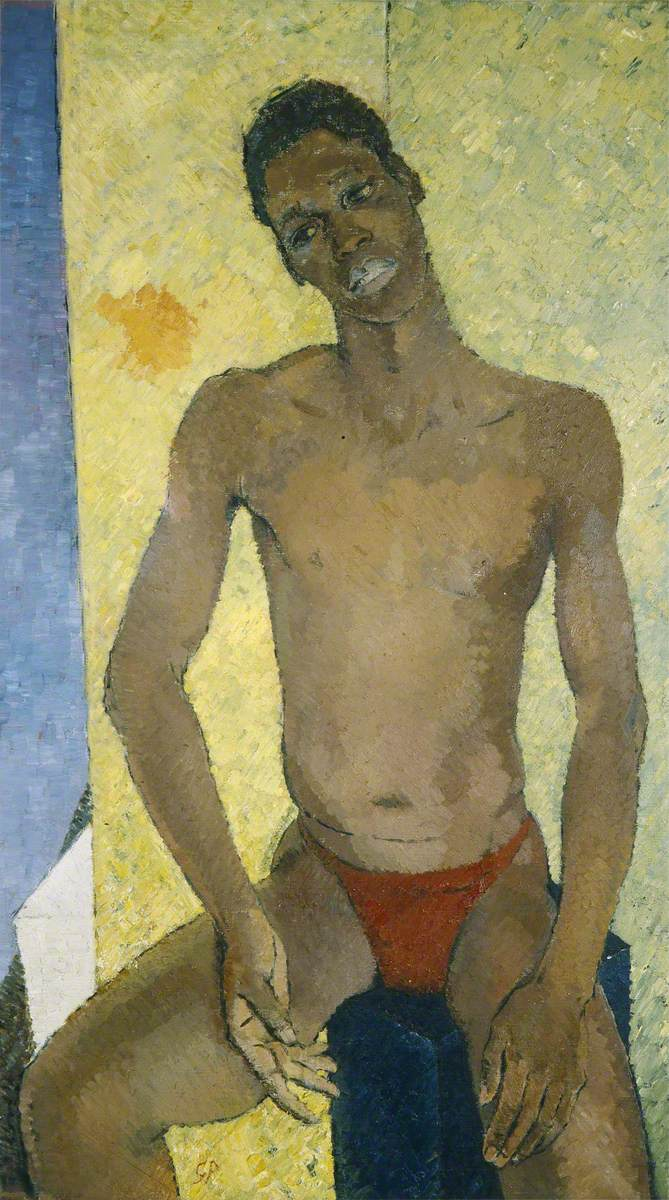
Melancholy Negro (Henry Thomas), 1936

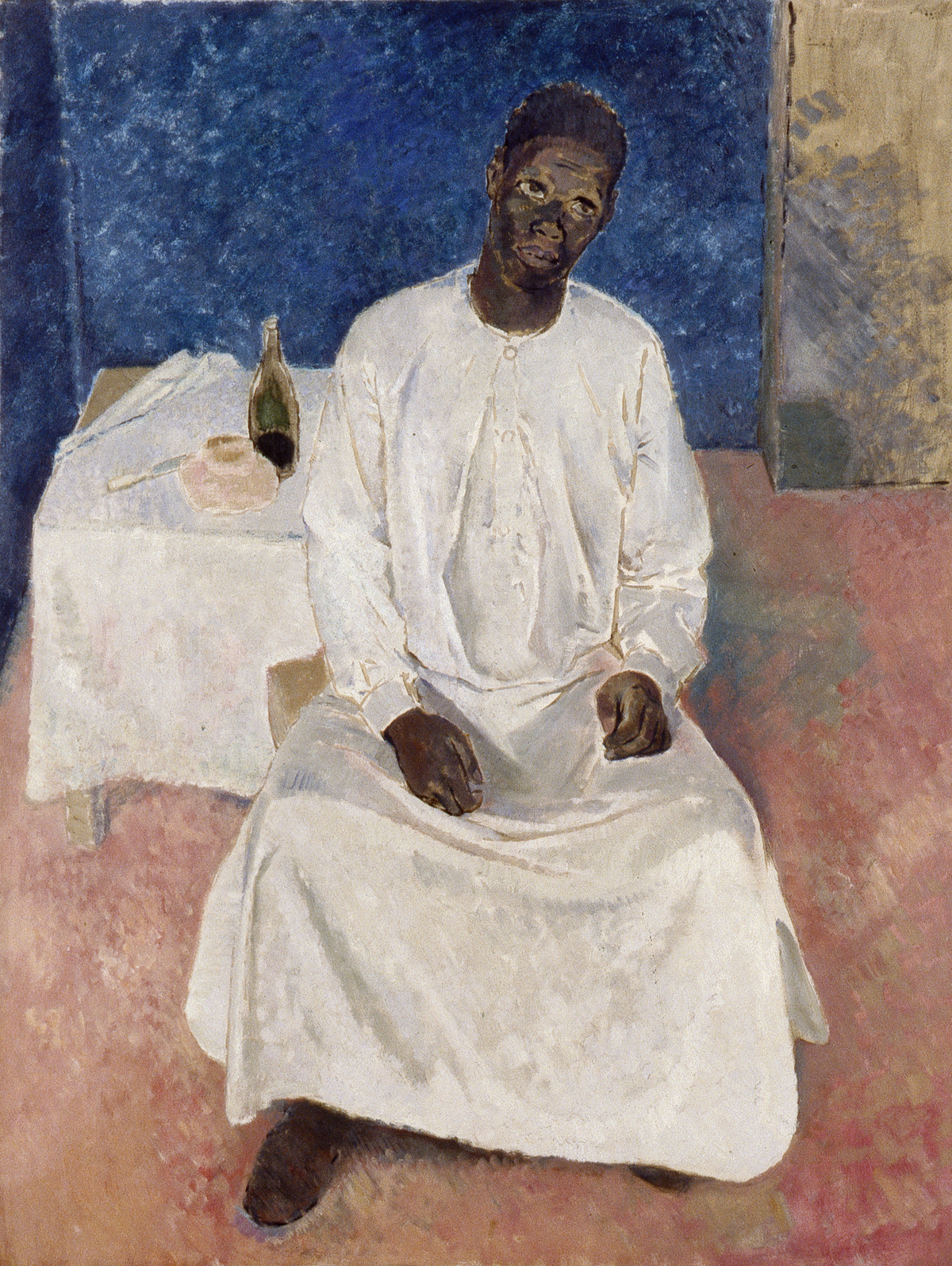
Negro Thinking of Heaven (Henry Thomas), 1937

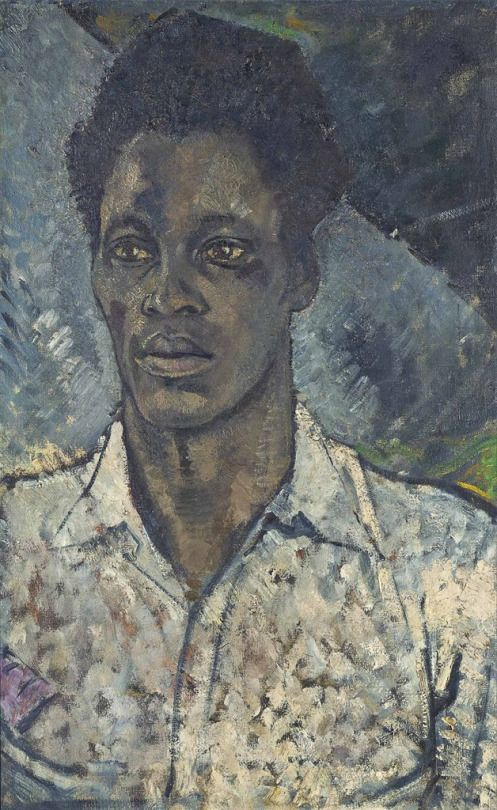
Portrait of Henry Thomas

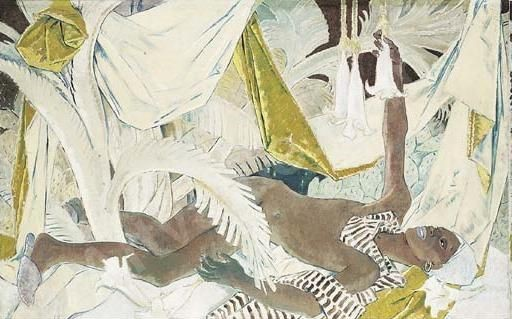
Reclining nude (Henry Thomas), ca 1935

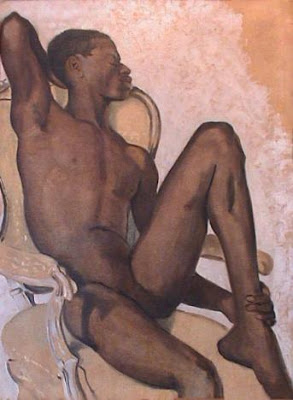
The Sleeping Negro (Henry Thomas), 1931

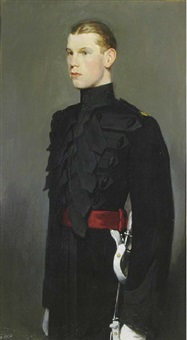
Lieutenant Henri-Marie-Joseph Aymes (1882-1964)

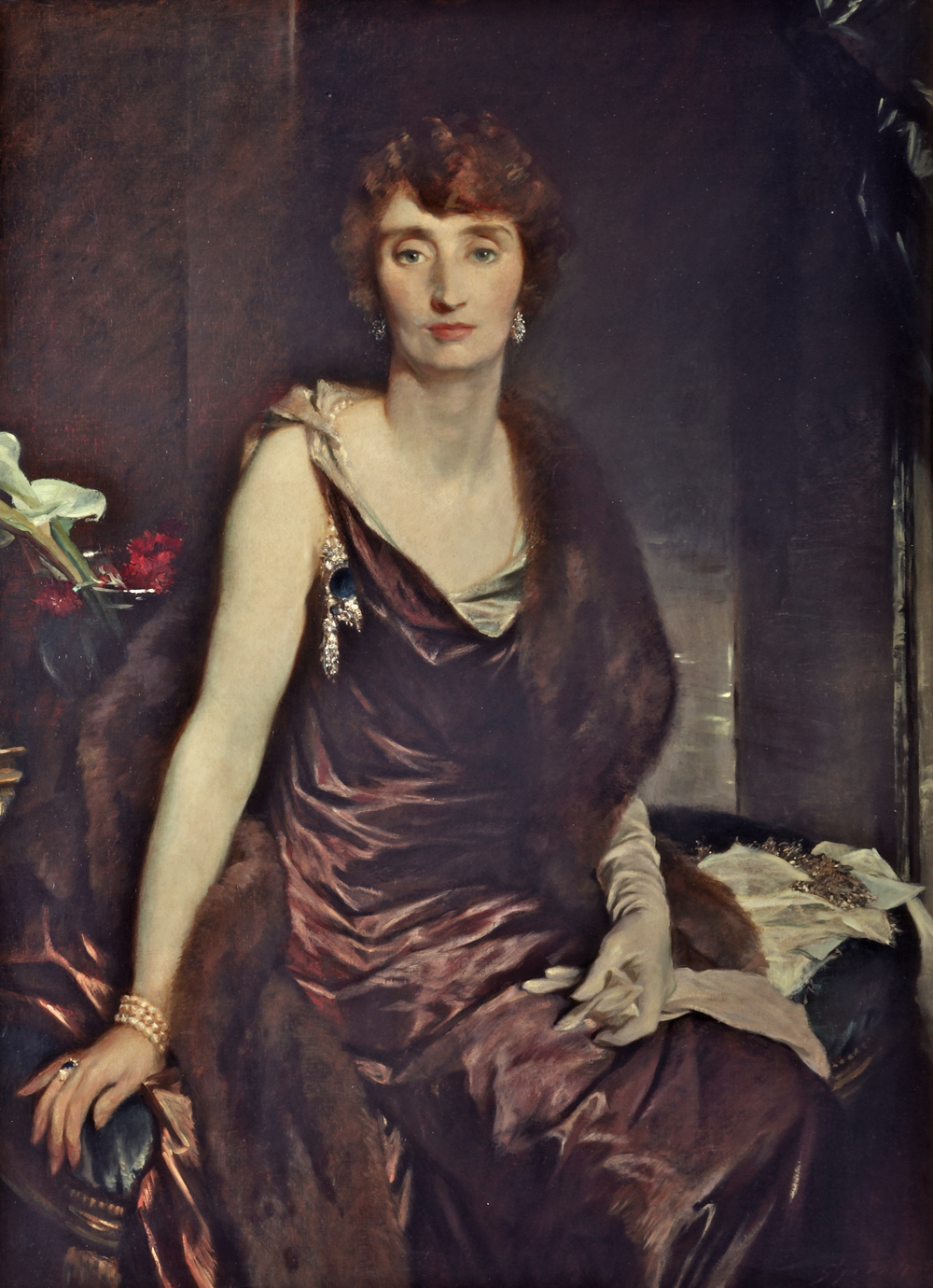
Irene Mountbatten, Marchioness of Carisbrooke, 1925

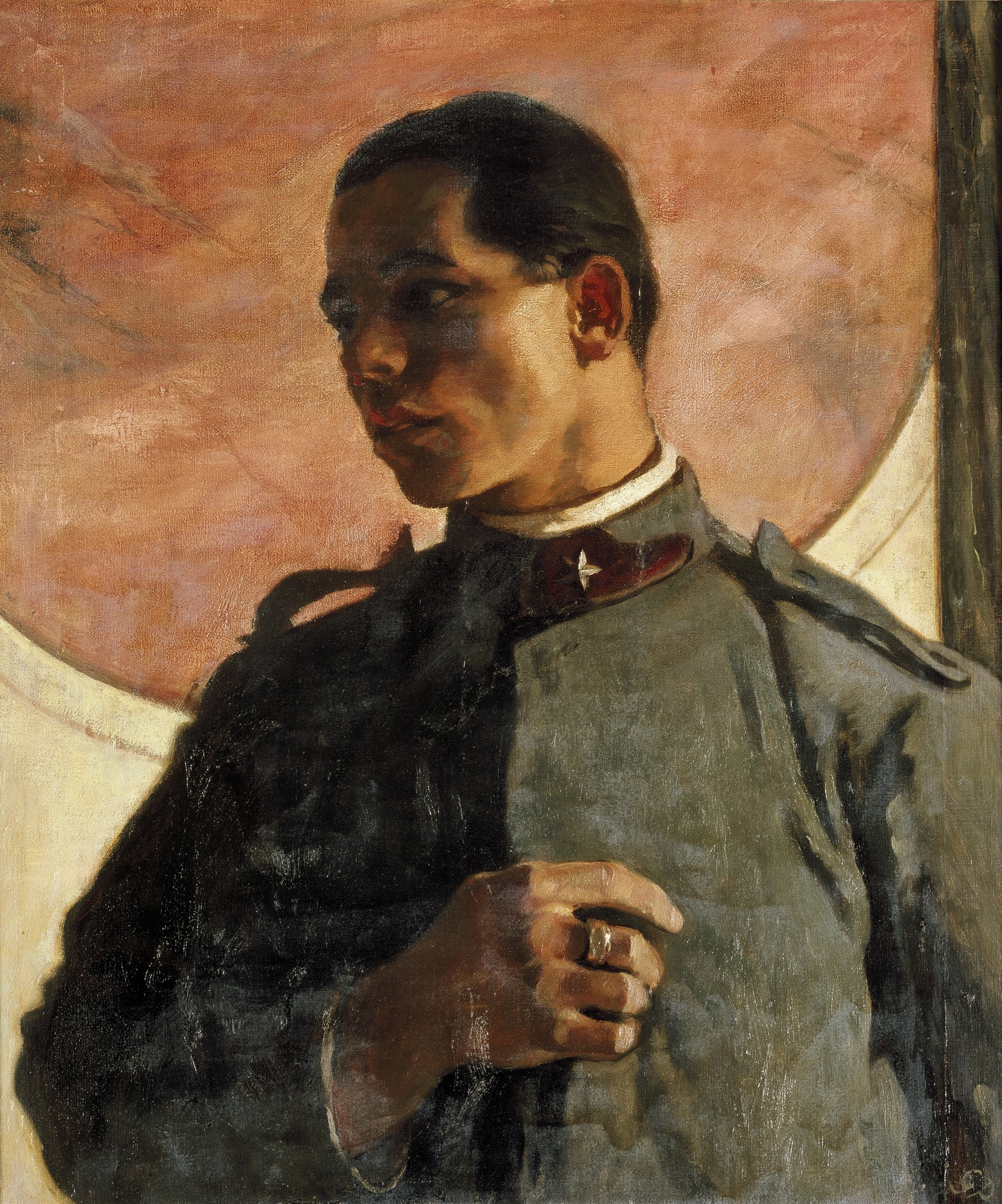
Italian Soldier, 1922

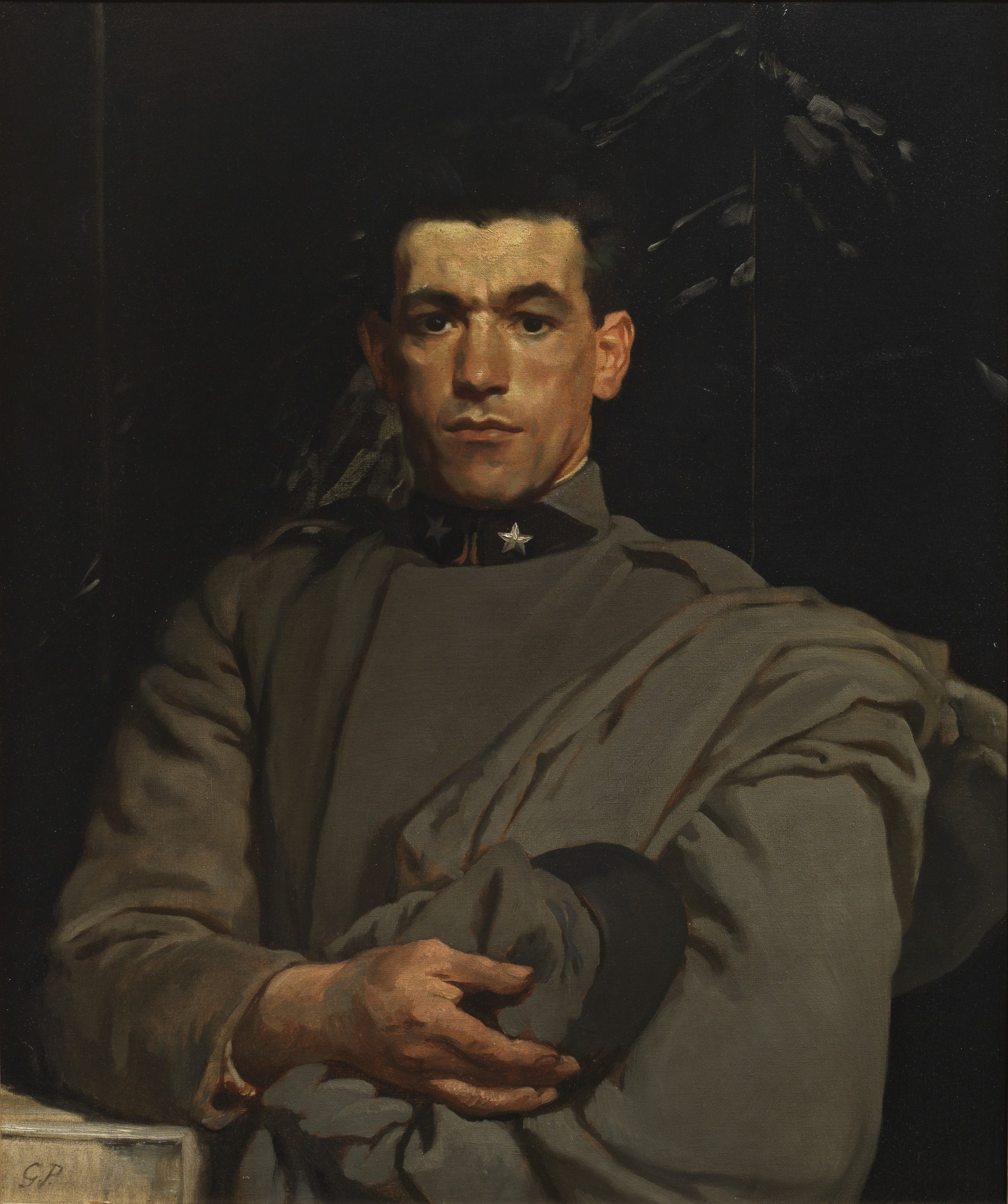
Italian Soldier No.2, ca 1918

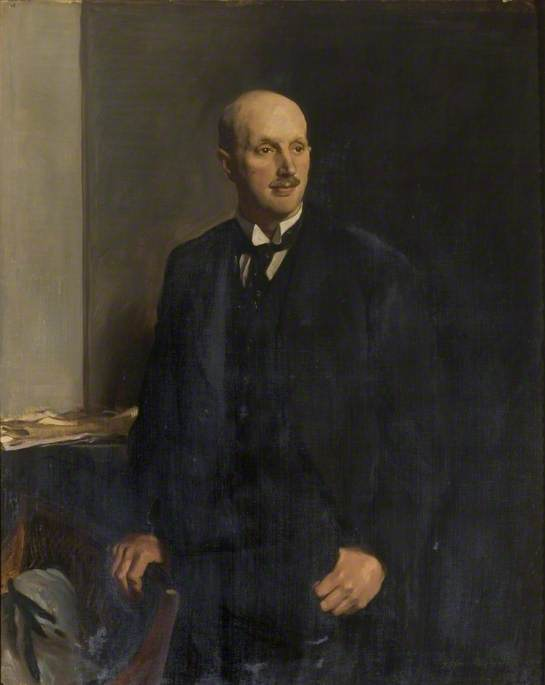
J.H. Marlow, Esq., Northampton Boots Manufacturer

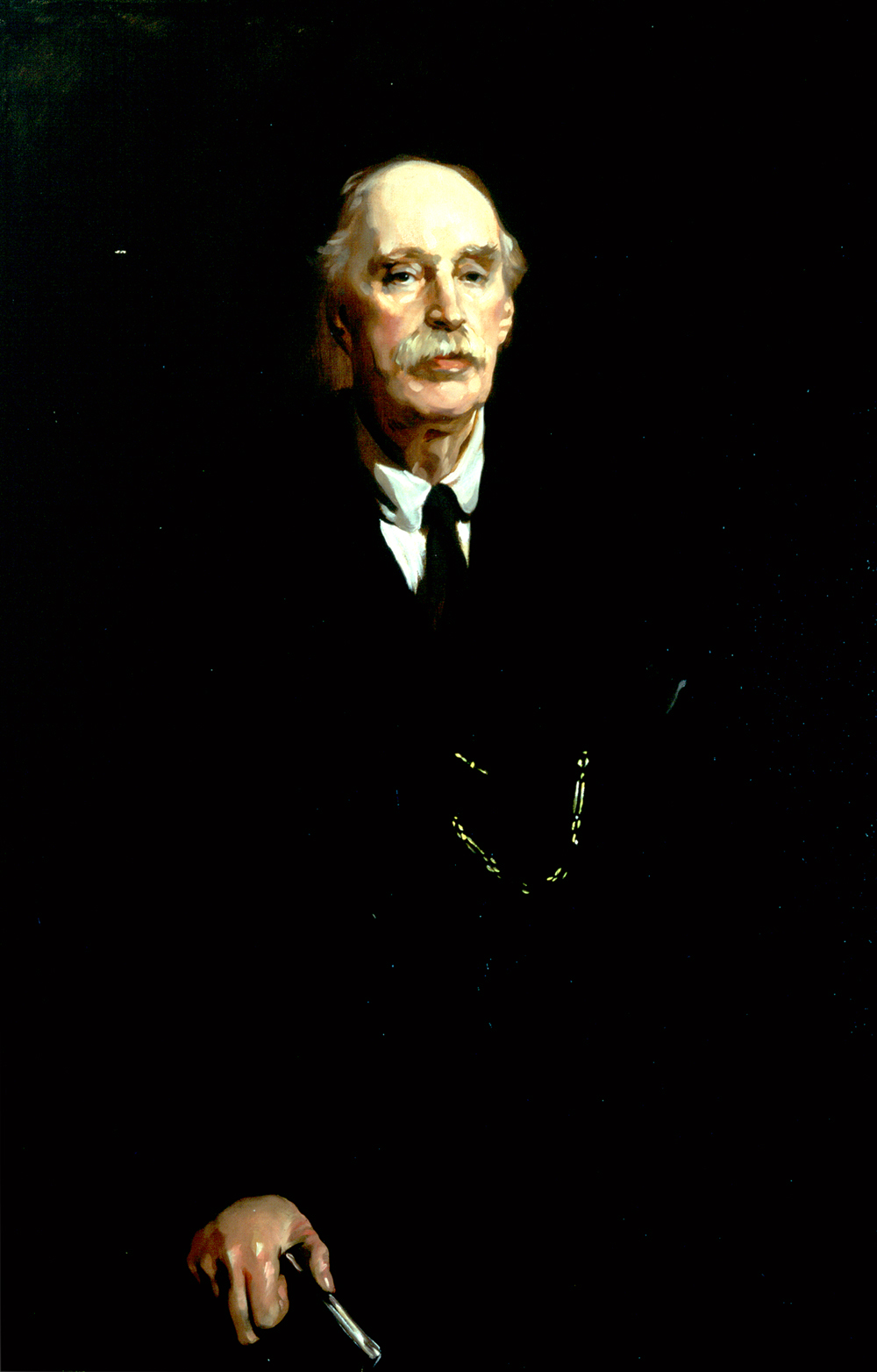
James Murray (East Aberdeenshire MP), 1918

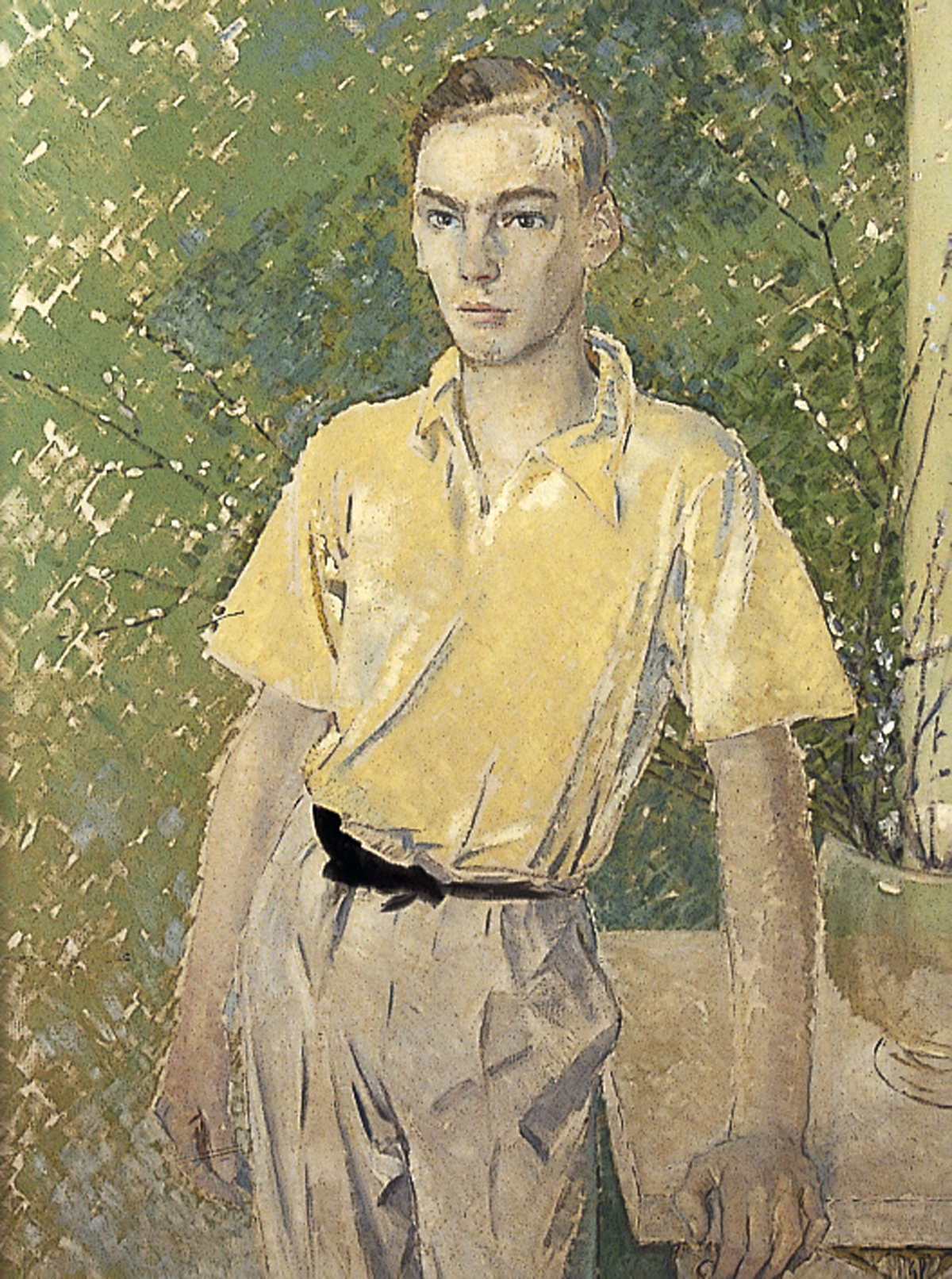
Master Jasper Fitzhardinge Kingscote (1917-1940), 1933

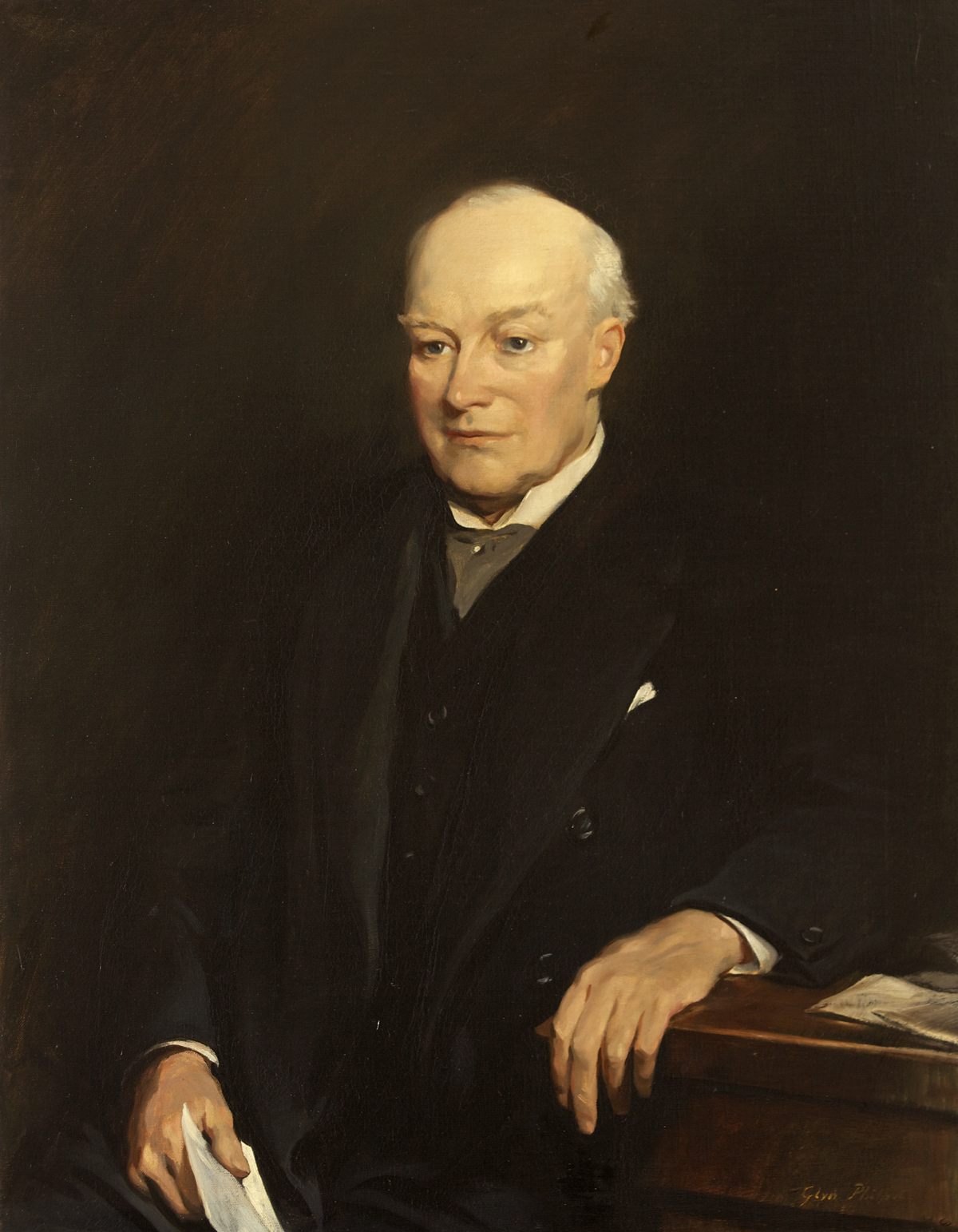
Jere Osborne, Clerk to the Society (1873-1919), ca 1920

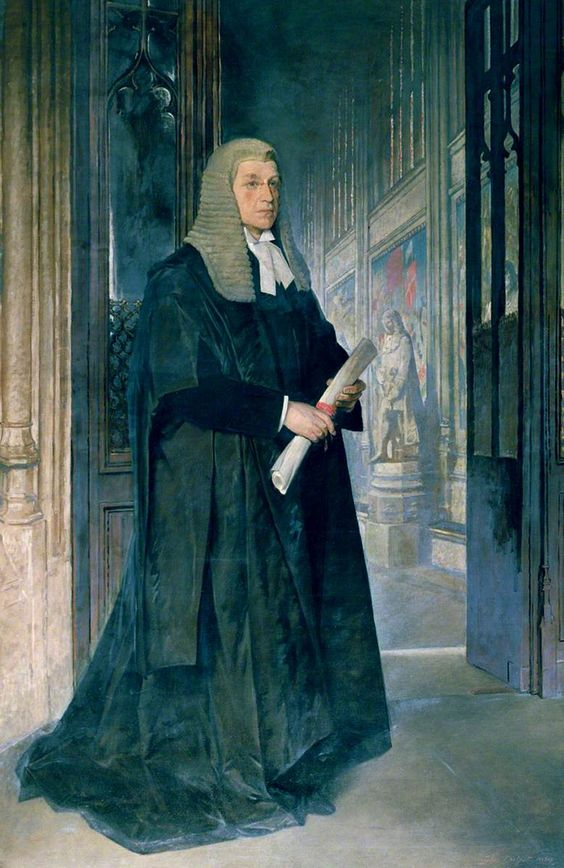
John Henry Whitley, 1929

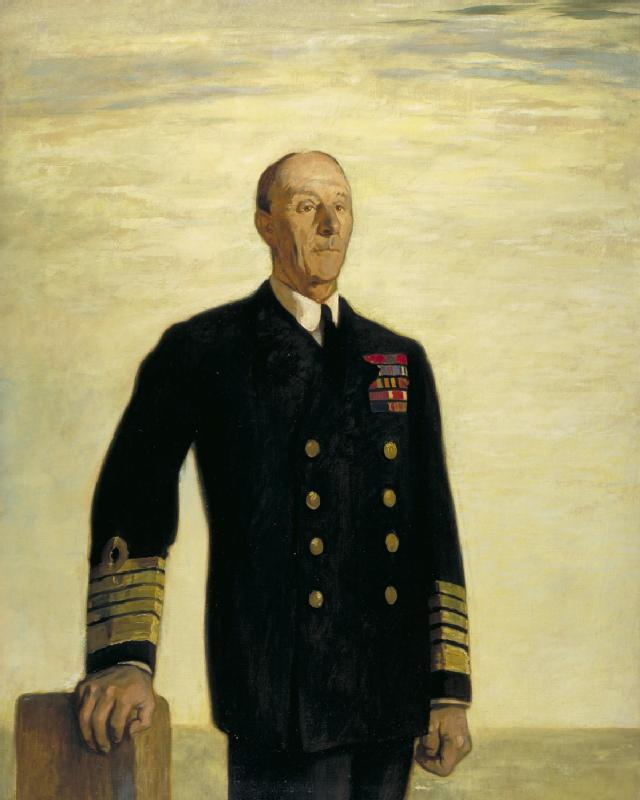
John Jellicoe, 1st Earl Jellicoe, 1918

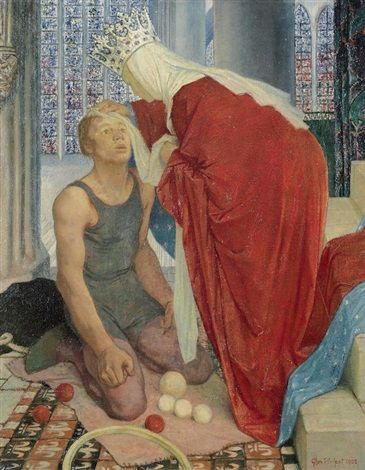
Le Jongleur Du Notre Dame, 1928

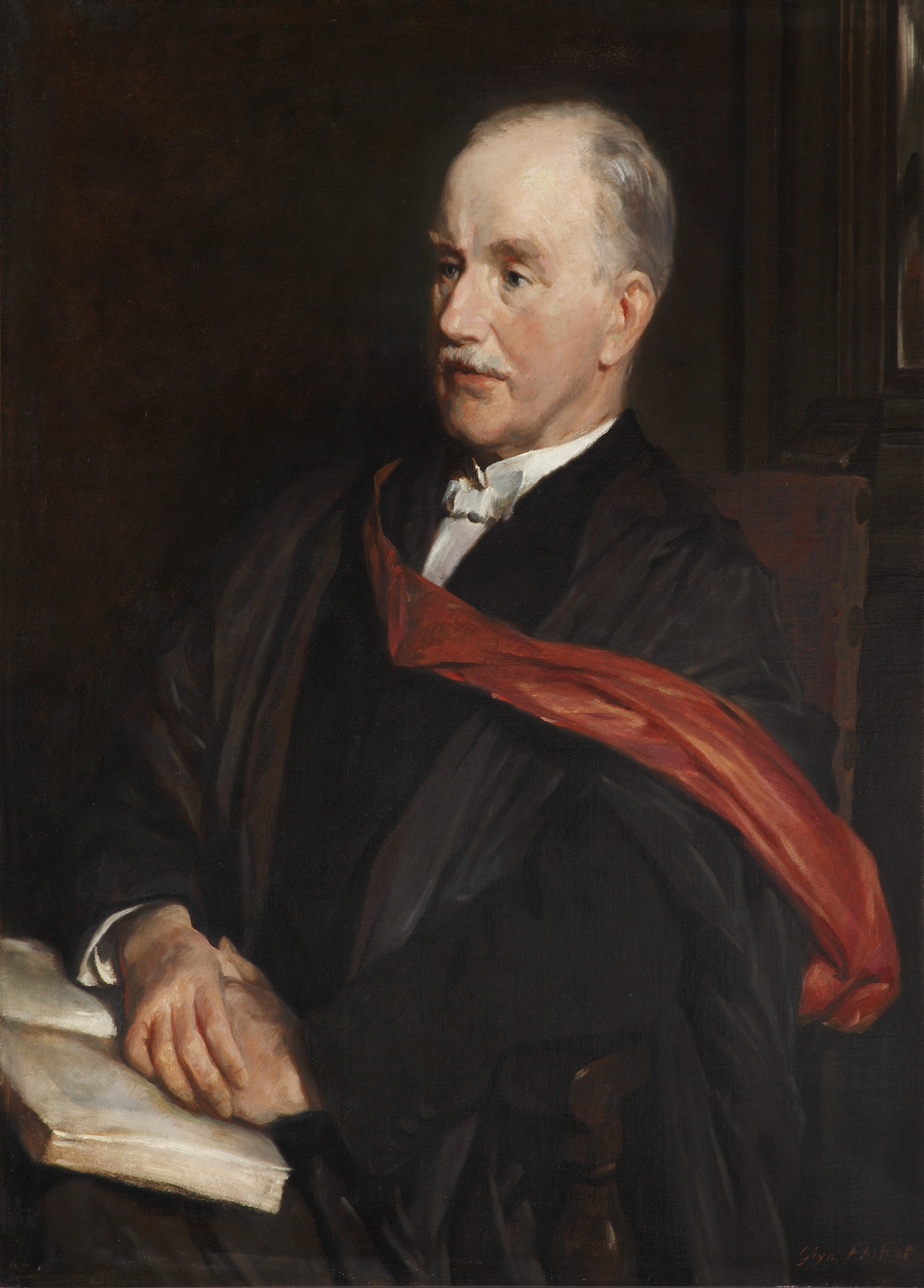
Joseph Wells, 1924

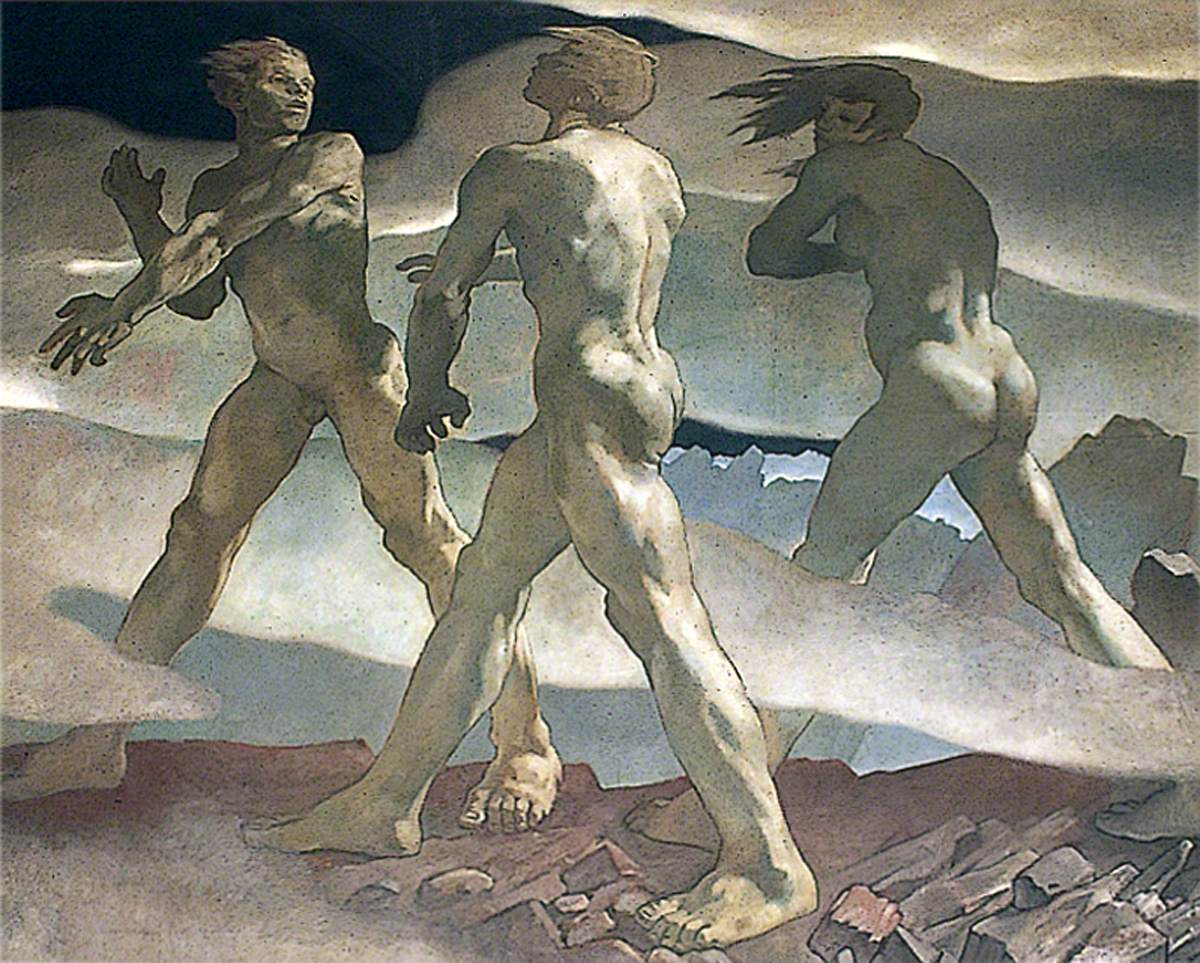
Journey of the Spirit, 1921

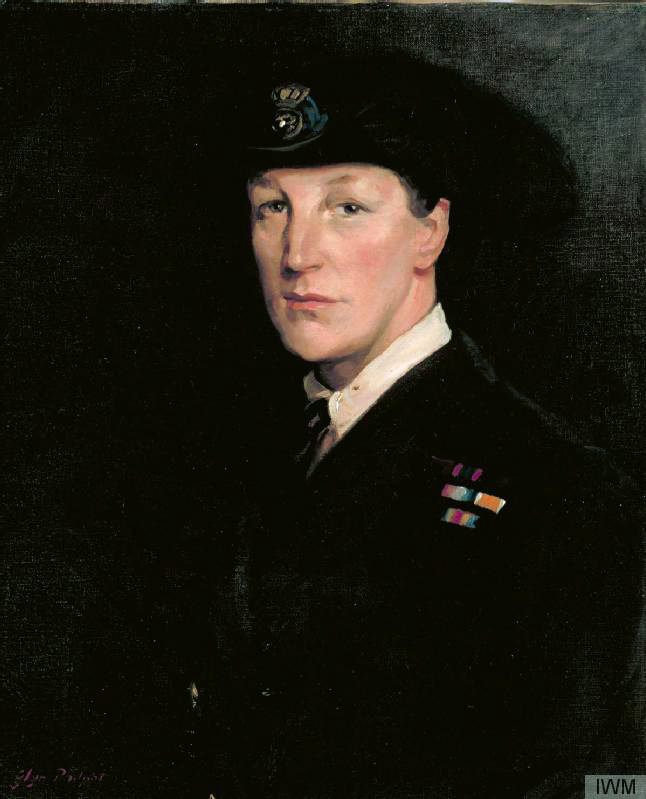
Dame Katharine Furse, 1920

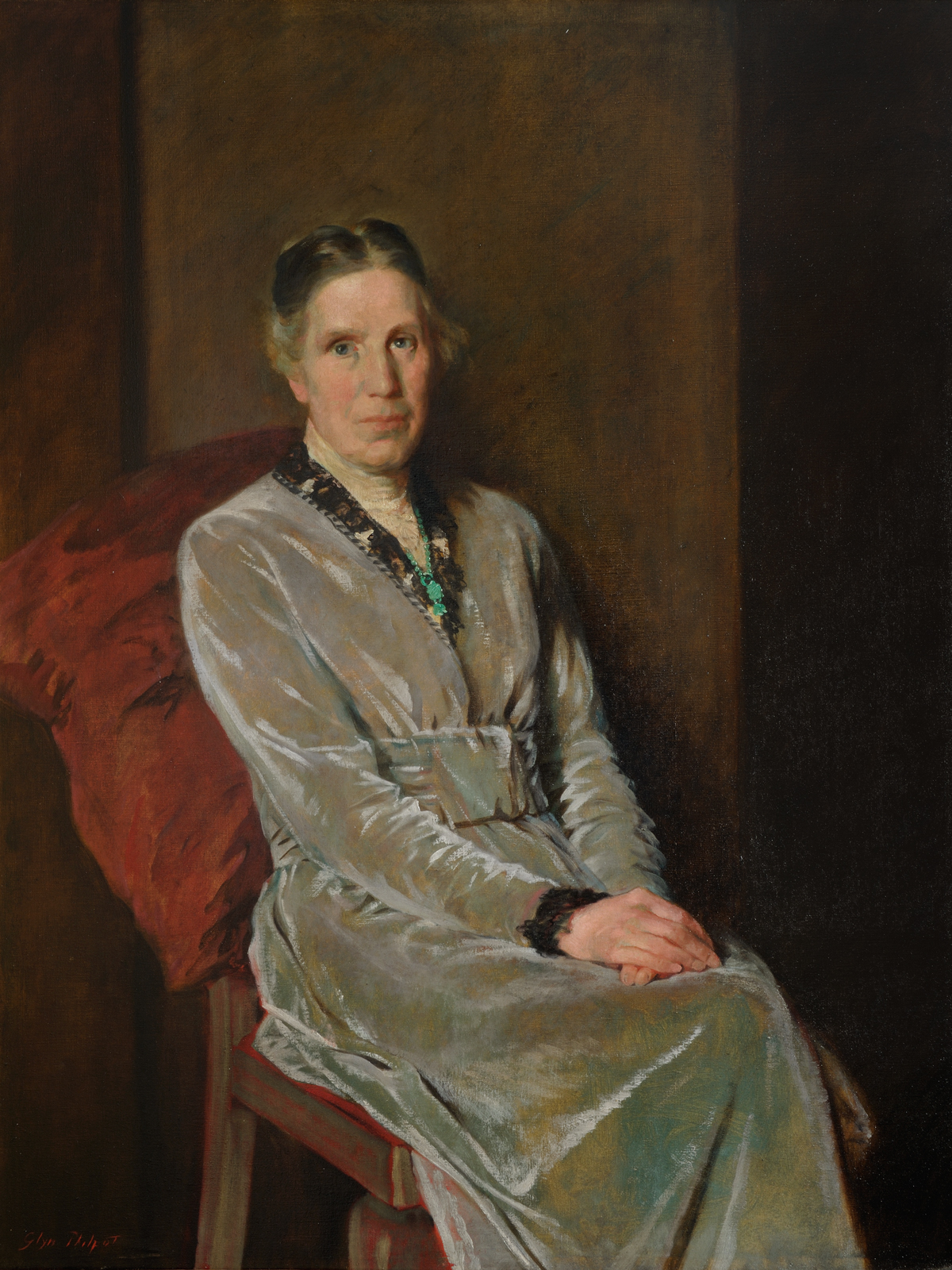
Katharine Stephen, 1921

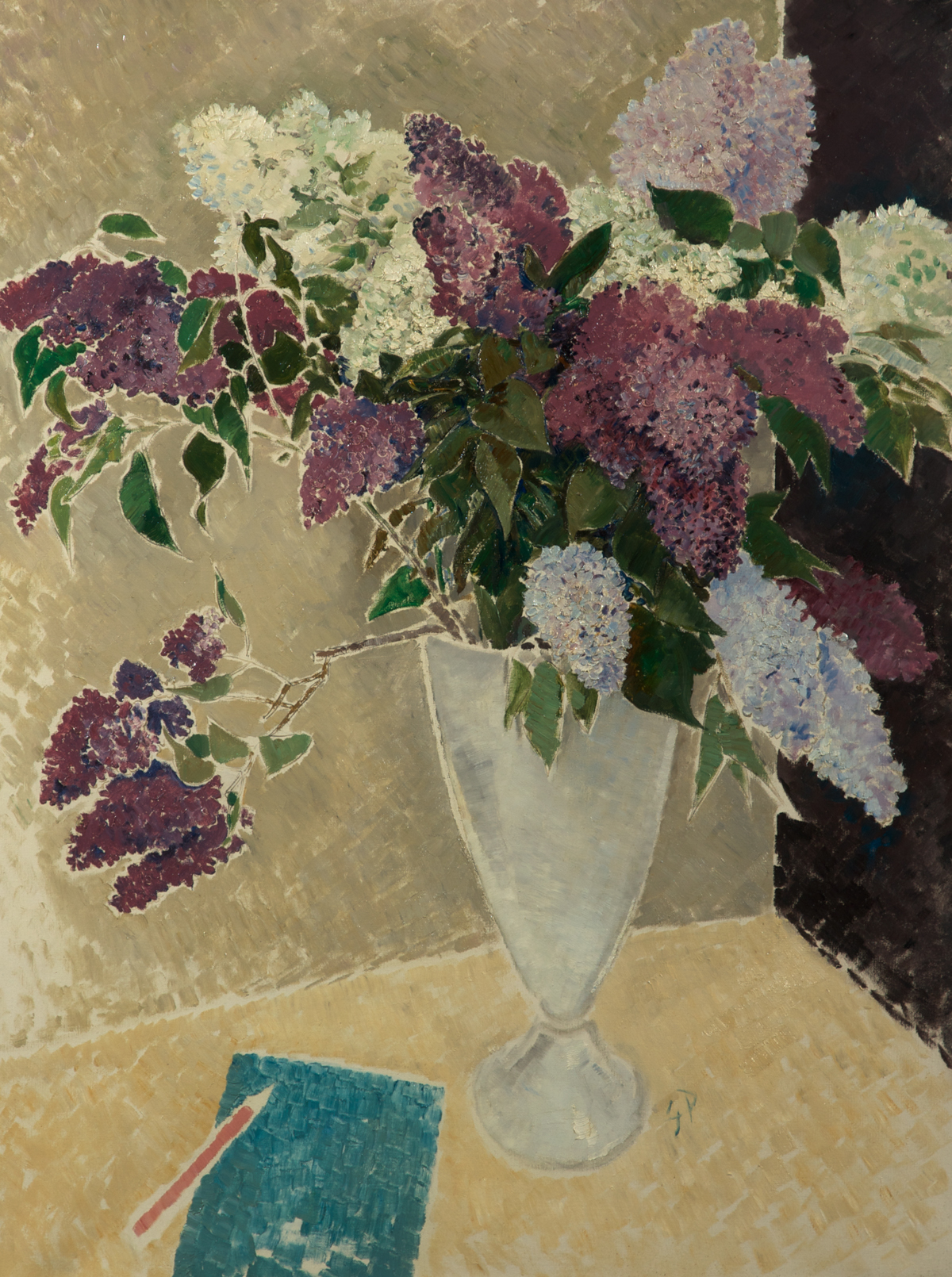
Lilacs

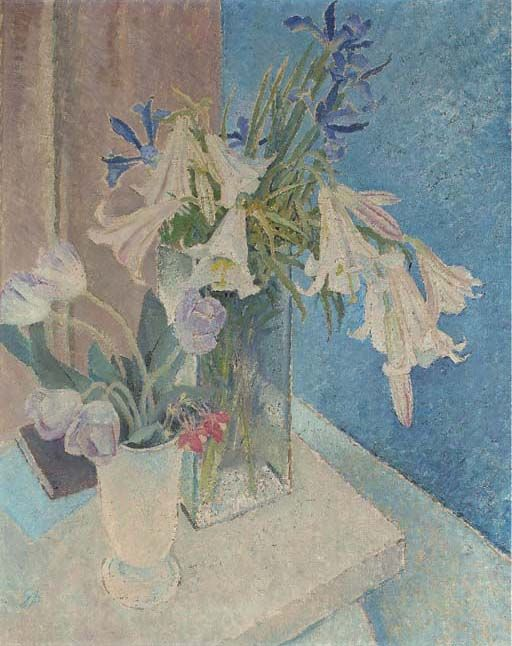
Lilies

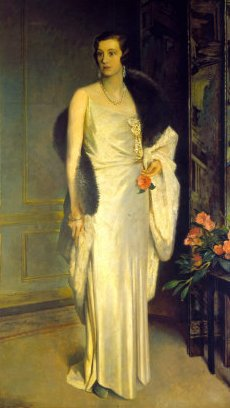
Loelia Lindsay, Duchess of Westminster

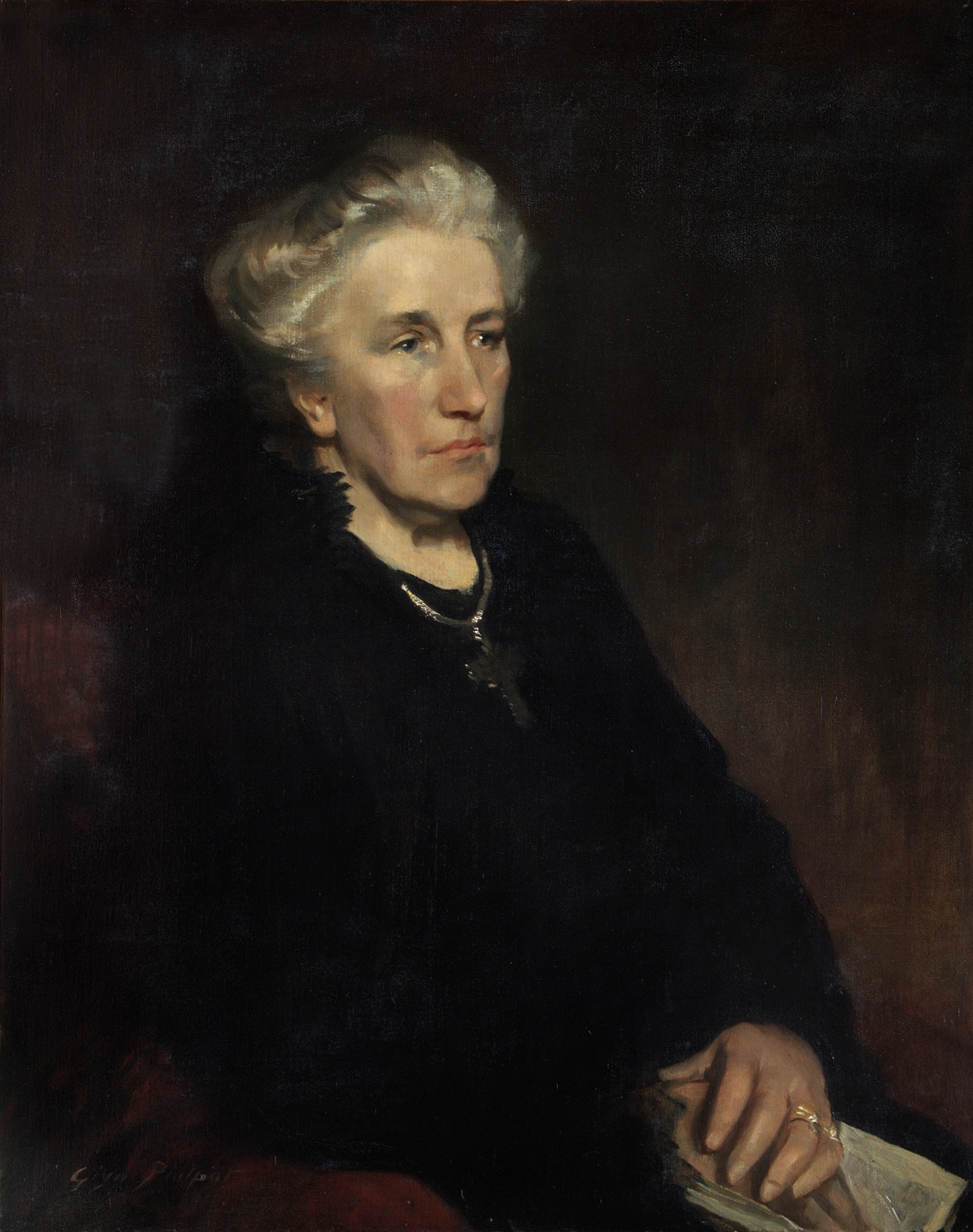
Louise Creighton, Wife of Mandell Creighton, Bishop of London

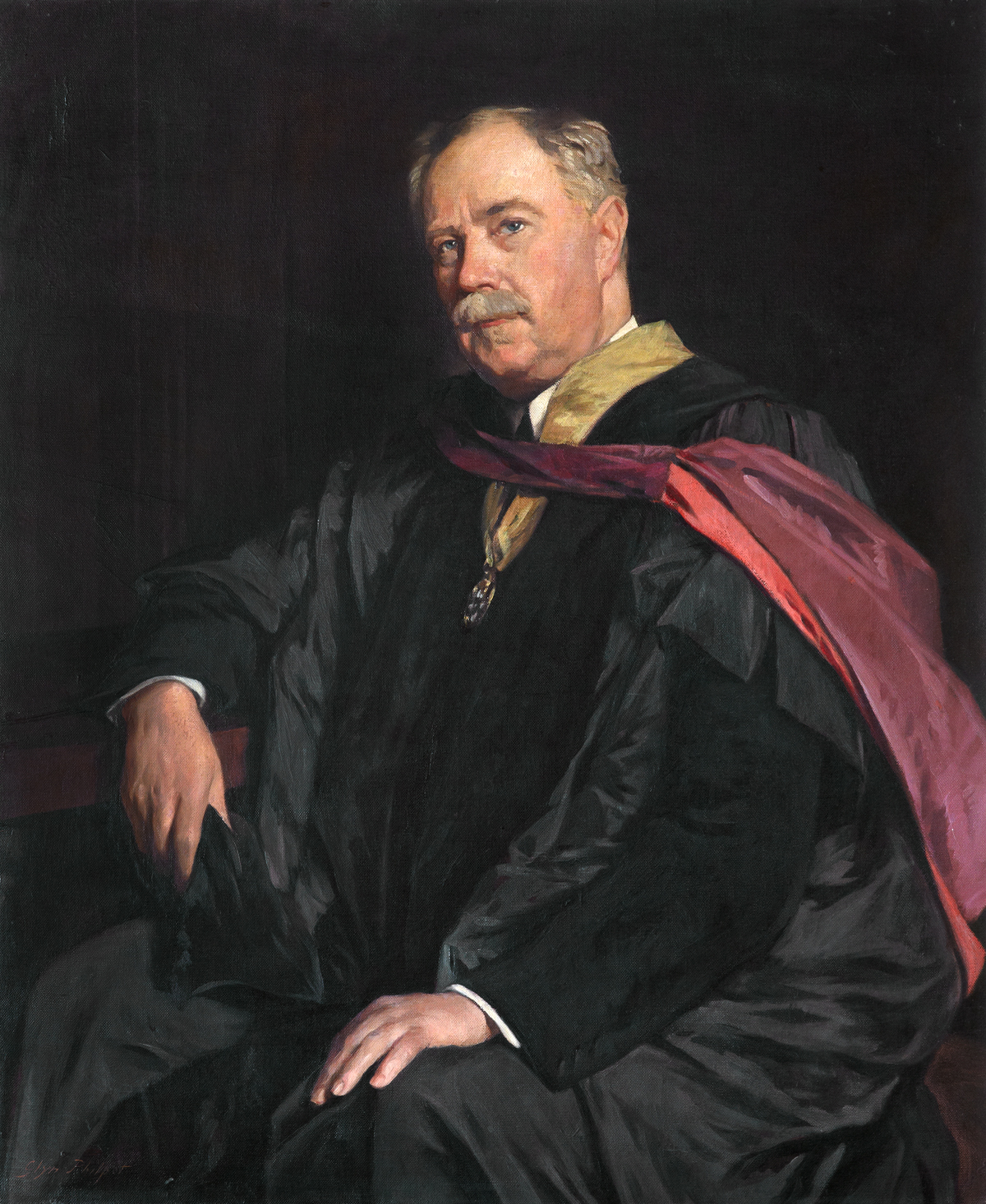
Sir Ludovic Grant (1862-1936), 1923

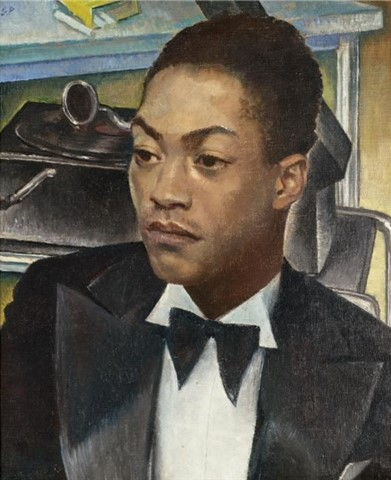
M. Julien Zaire (Tom Whiskey), 1931–32

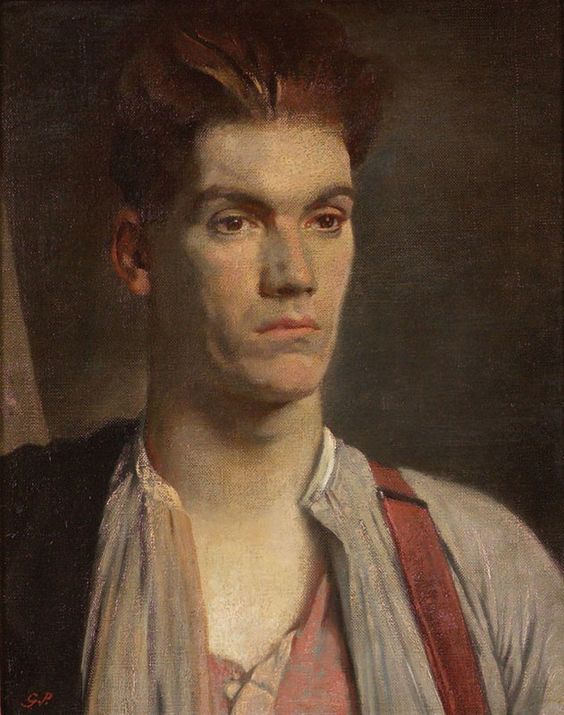
Head of a man

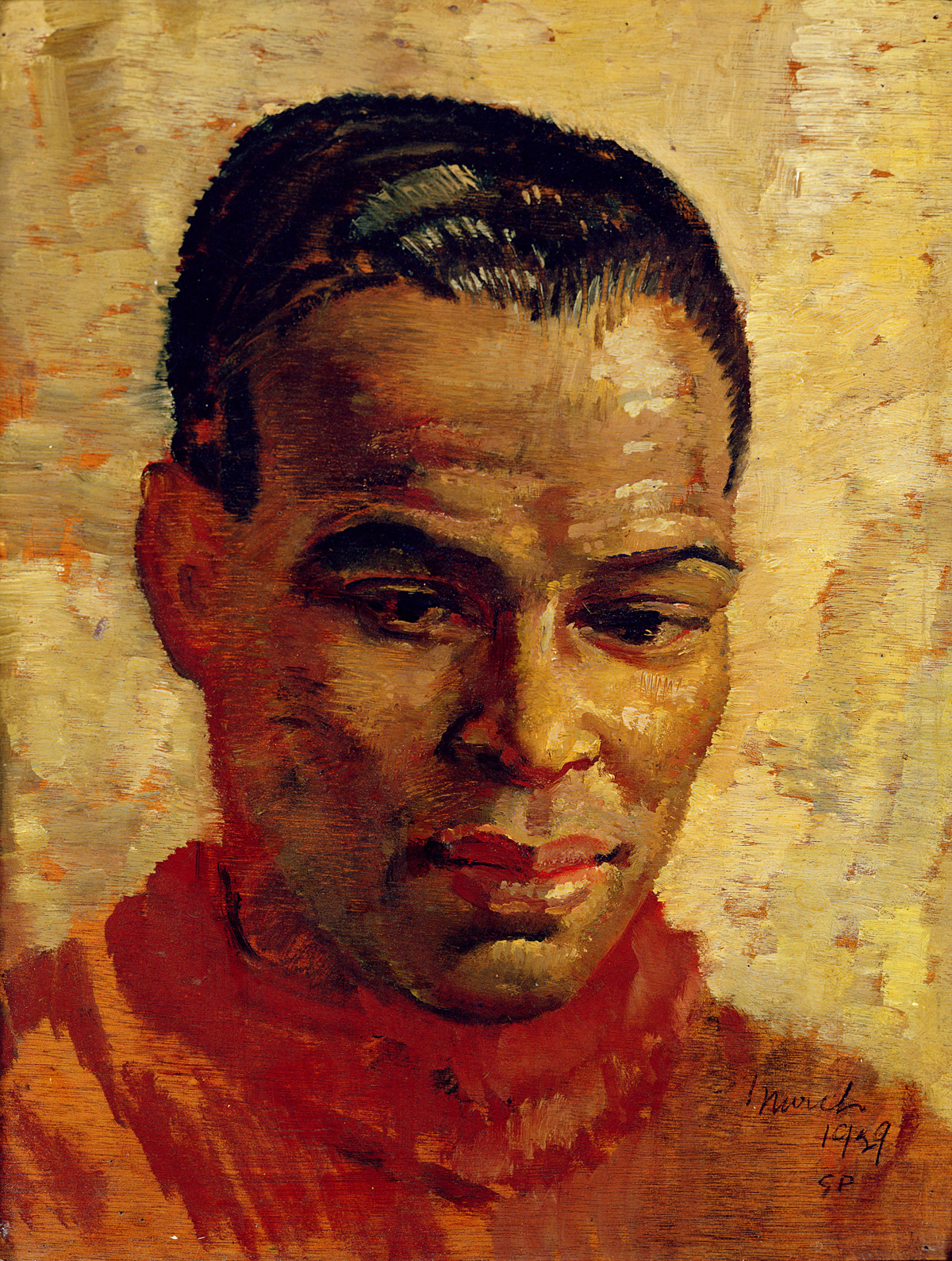
Portrait of a Man, 1929

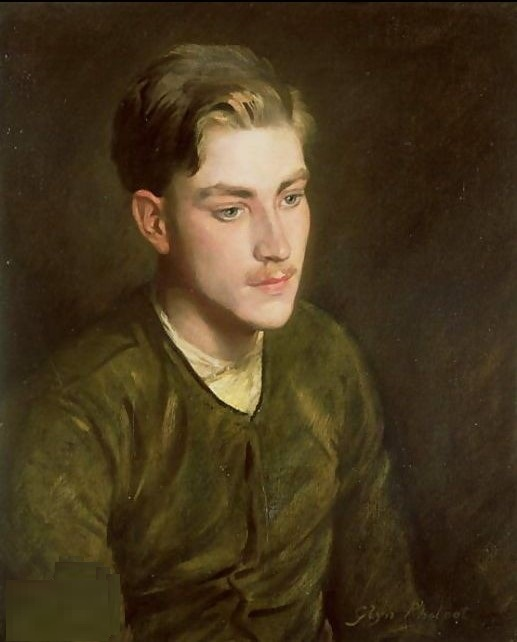
Man in a Flying Jacket, 1916

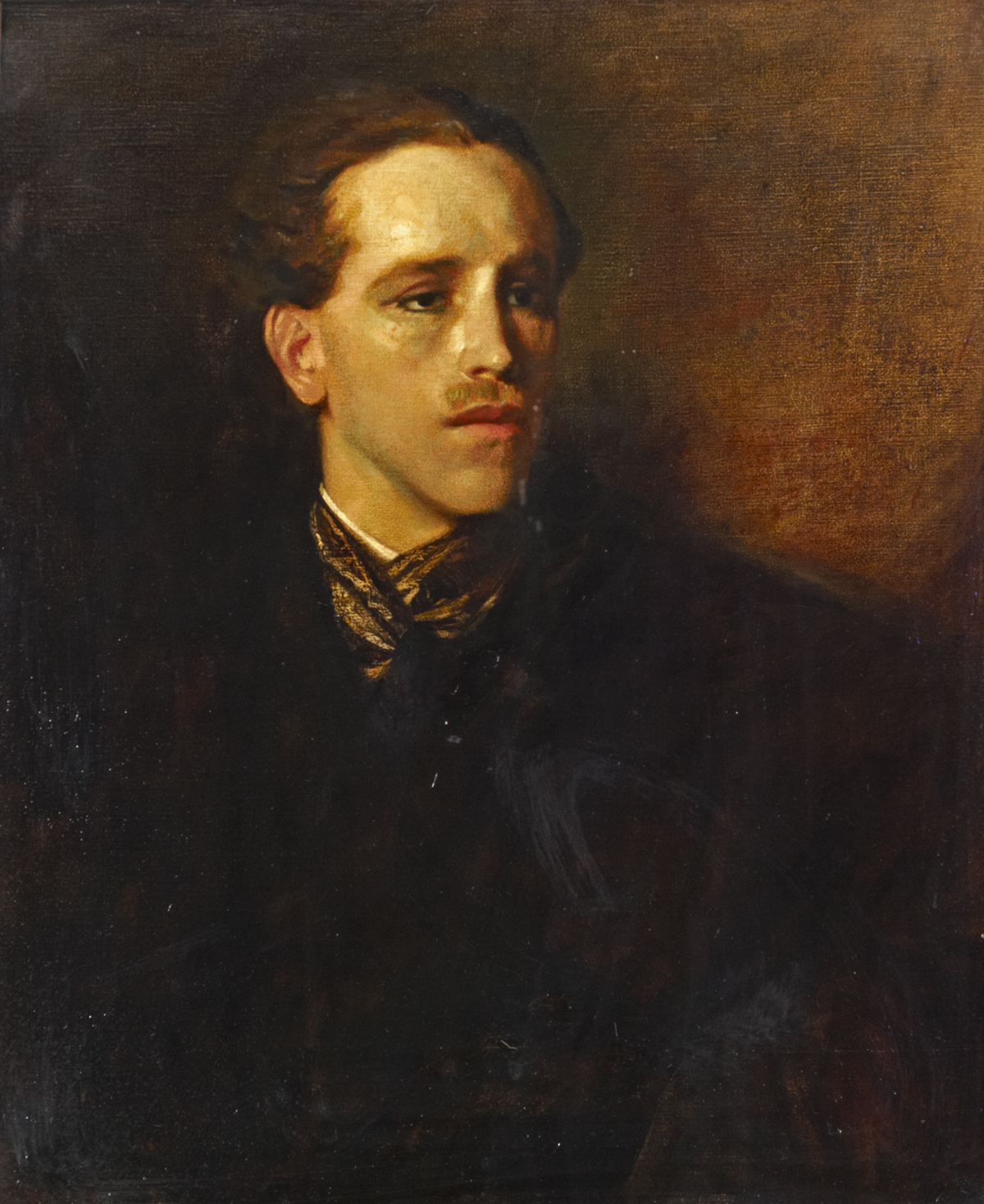
Portrait of a Man in Black

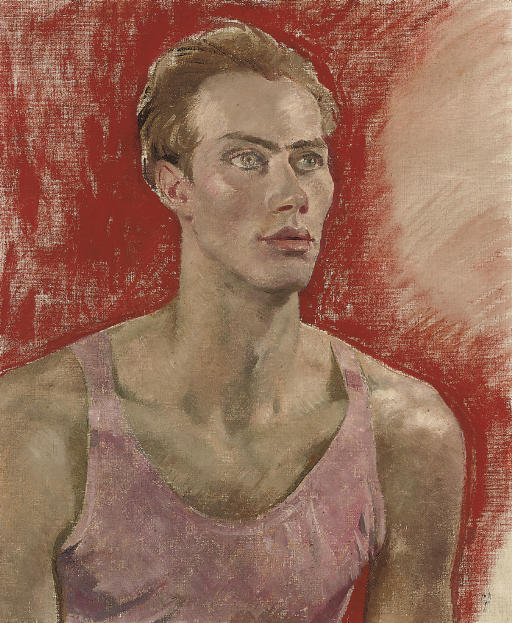
Man in Pink, 1930s

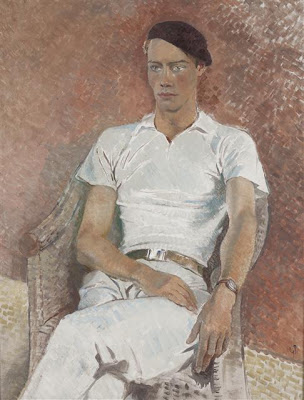
Man in White, 1930s

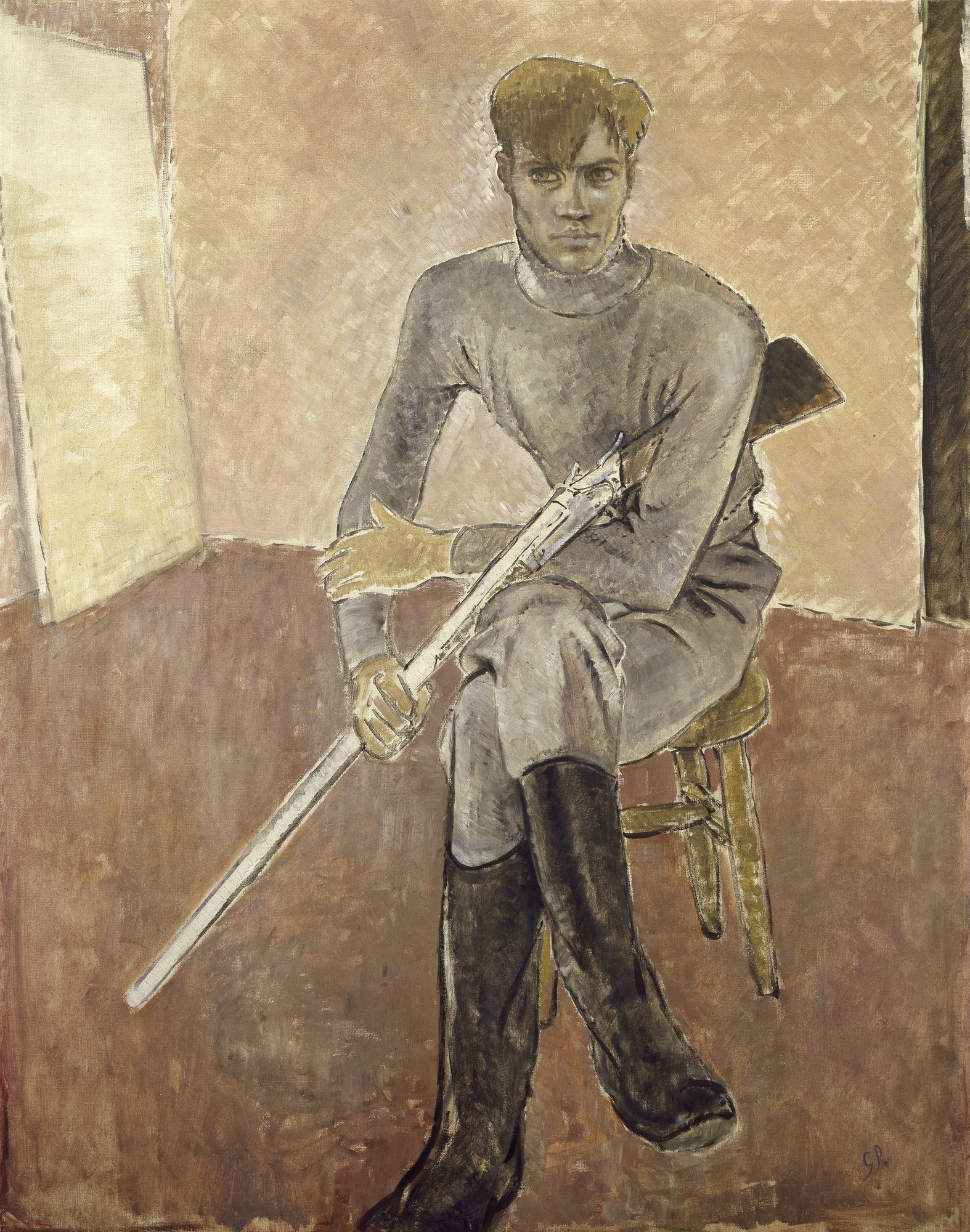
Man with a Gun, 1933

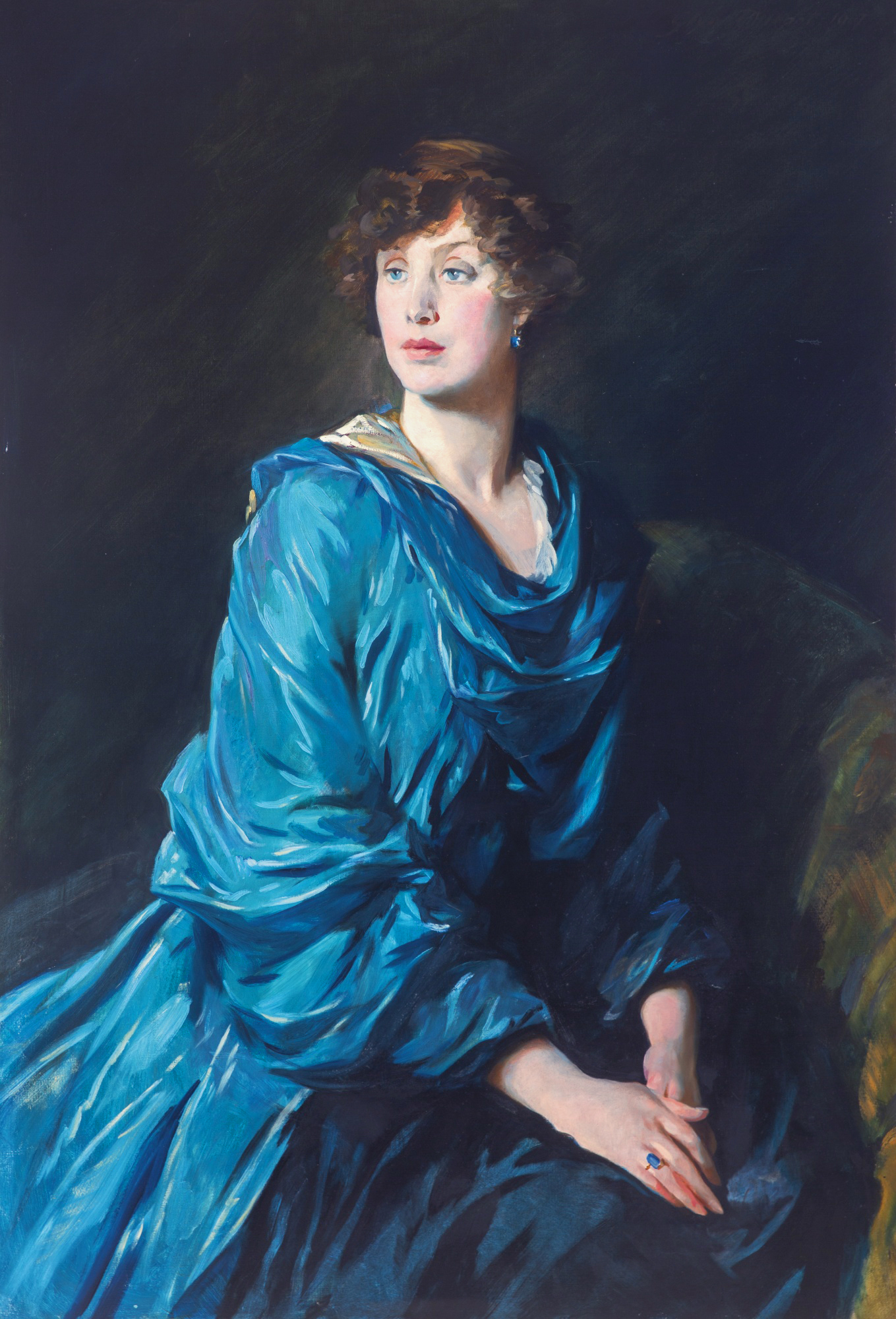
Margaret (Peggy) Crewe-Milnes, Marchioness of Crewe (wife of Robert Crewe-Milnes, 1st Marquess of Crewe), 1917

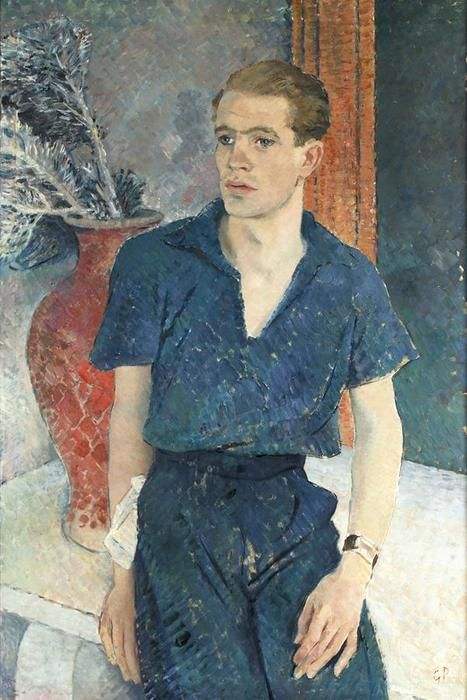
Martyn Coleman

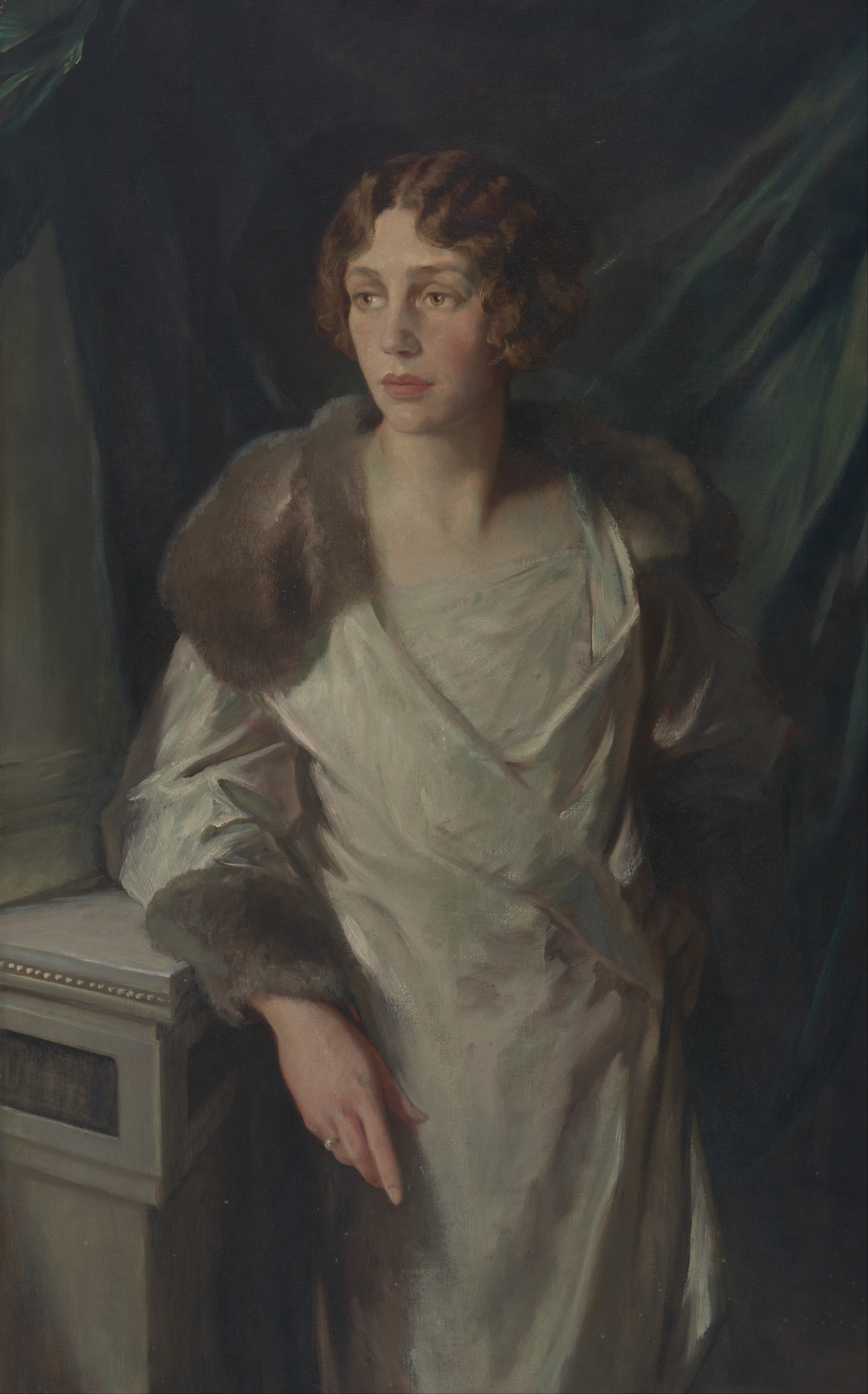
Mary Borden

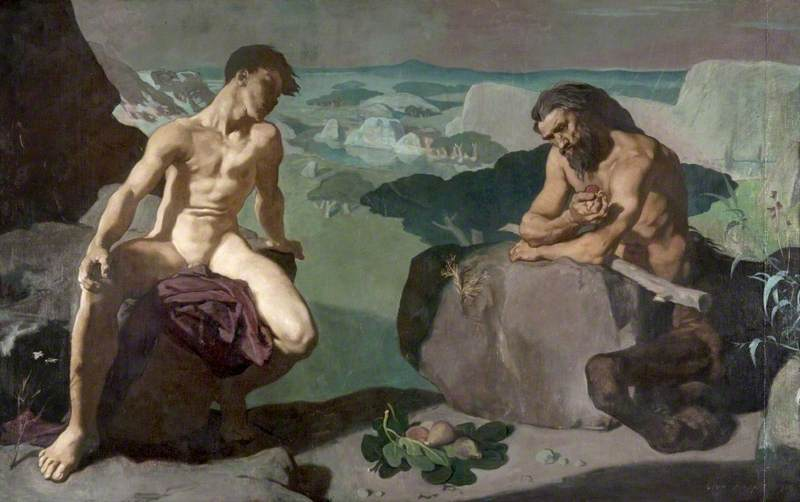
Melampus and the Centaur, 1919

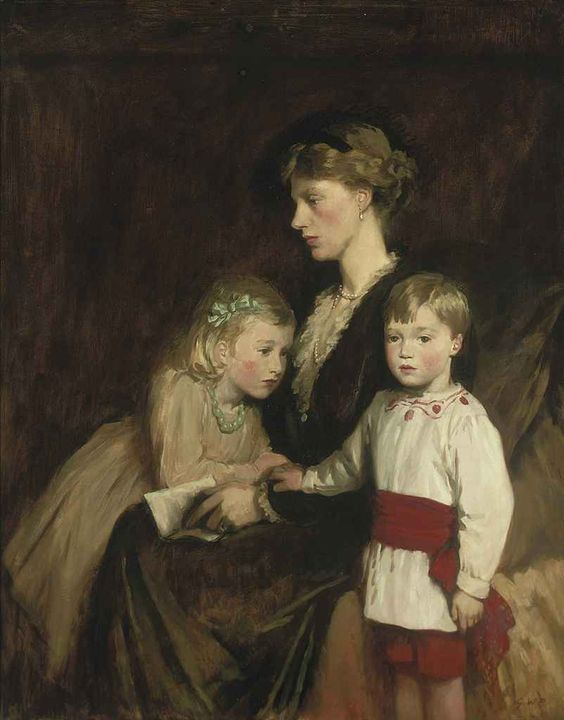
Portrait of a mother and children

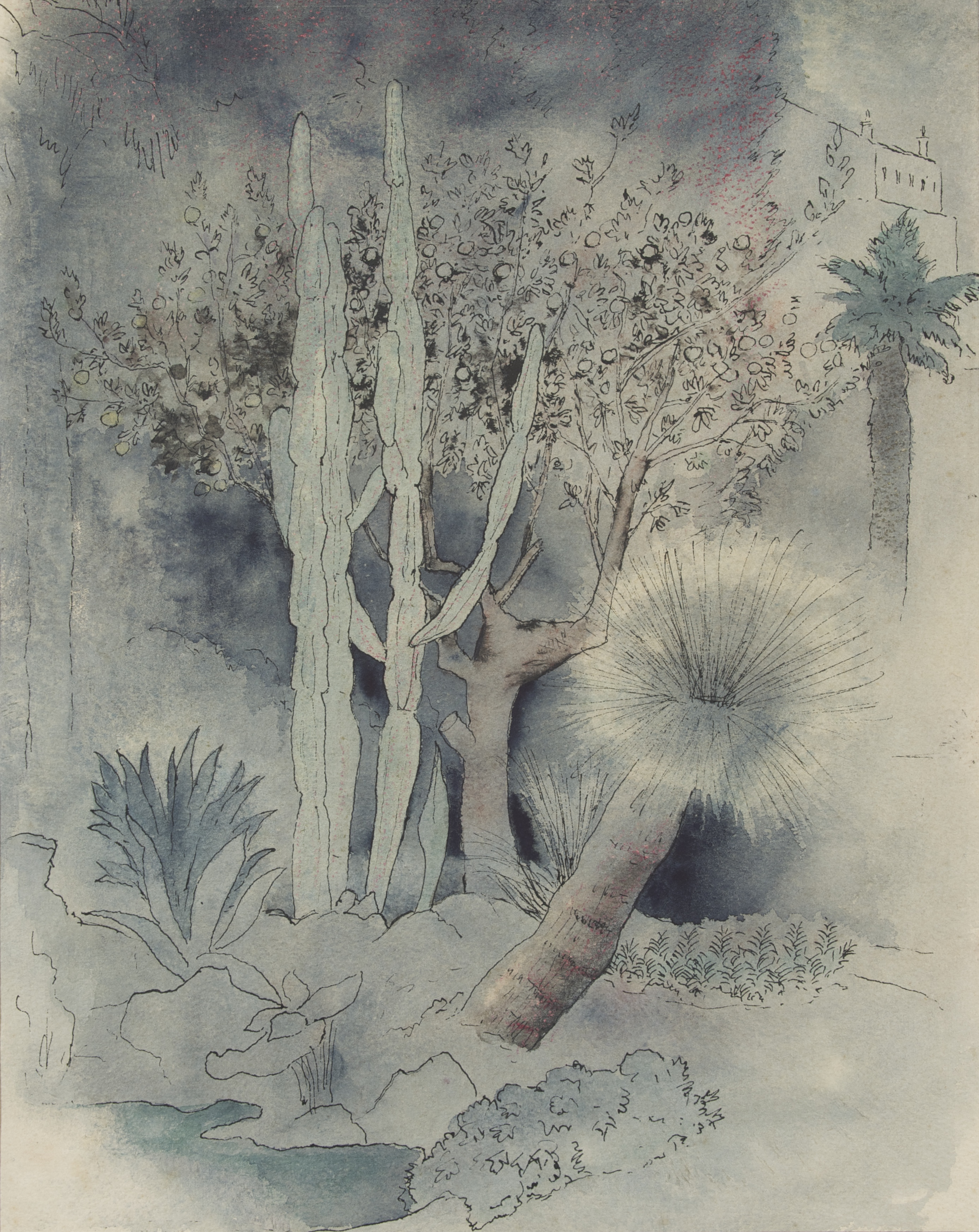
Orange Tree and Cactus

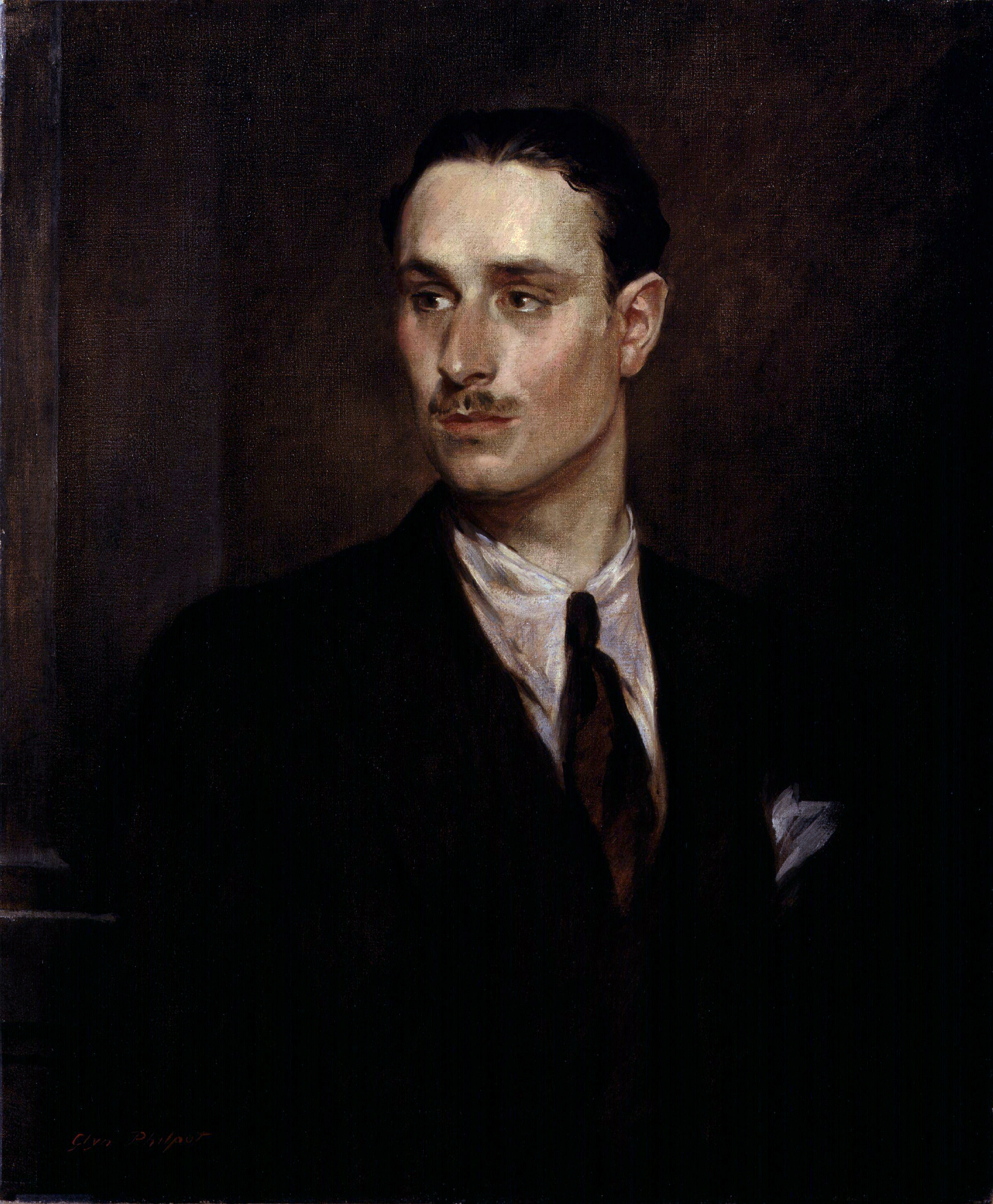
Sir Oswald Mosley, 6th Baronet, 1925

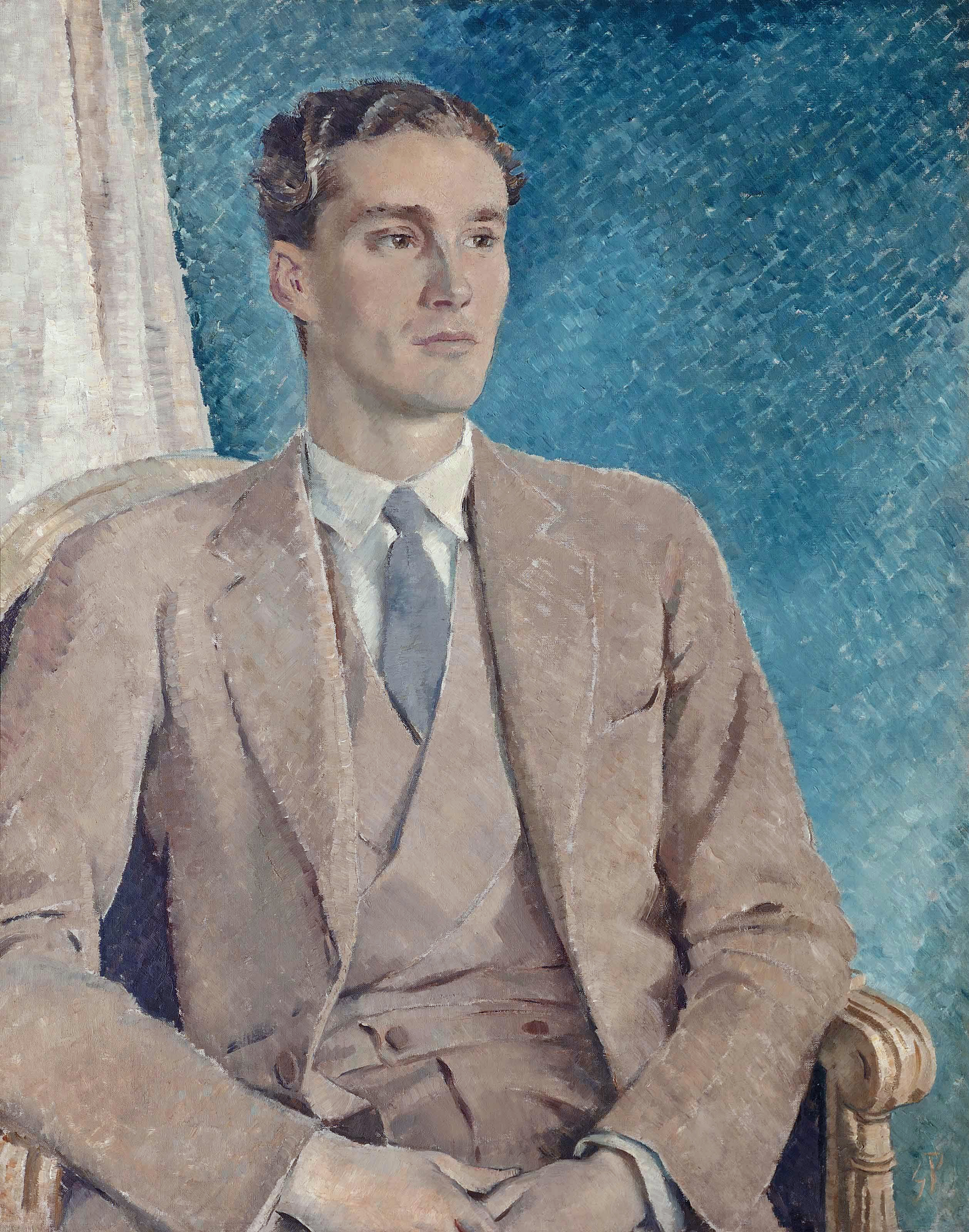
Patrick Buchan-Hepburn, 1st Baron Hailes, 1934

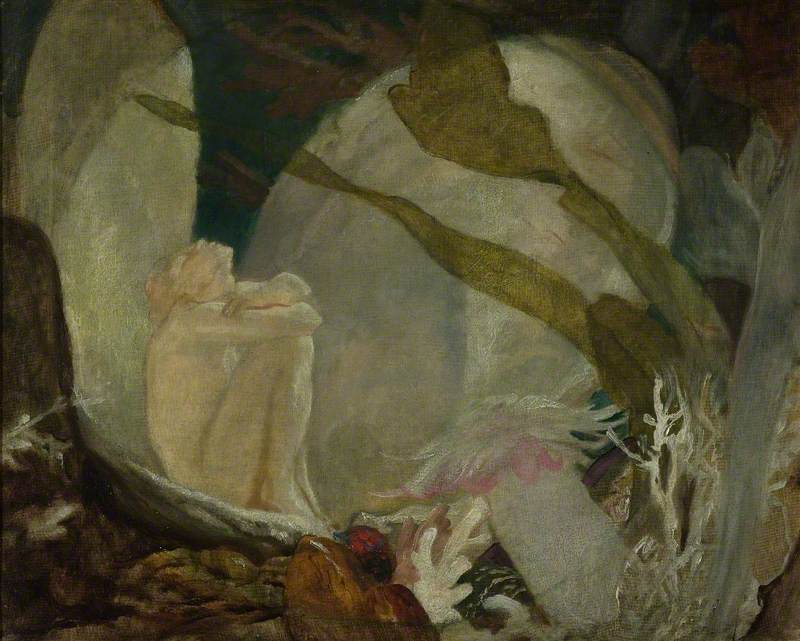
The Pearl, 1914

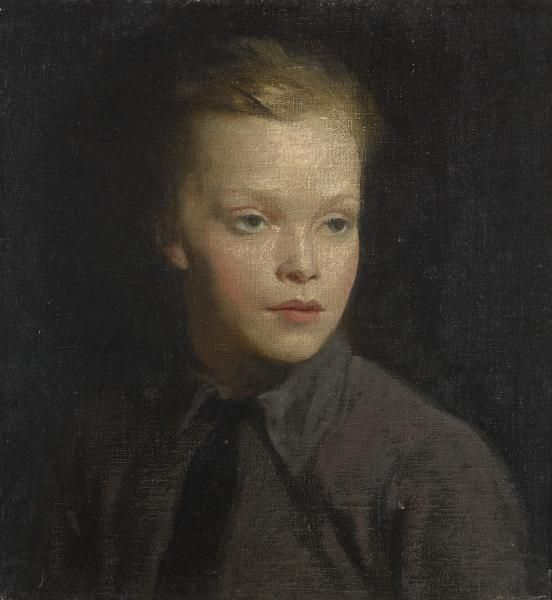
Peter Hannen, 1915-1916

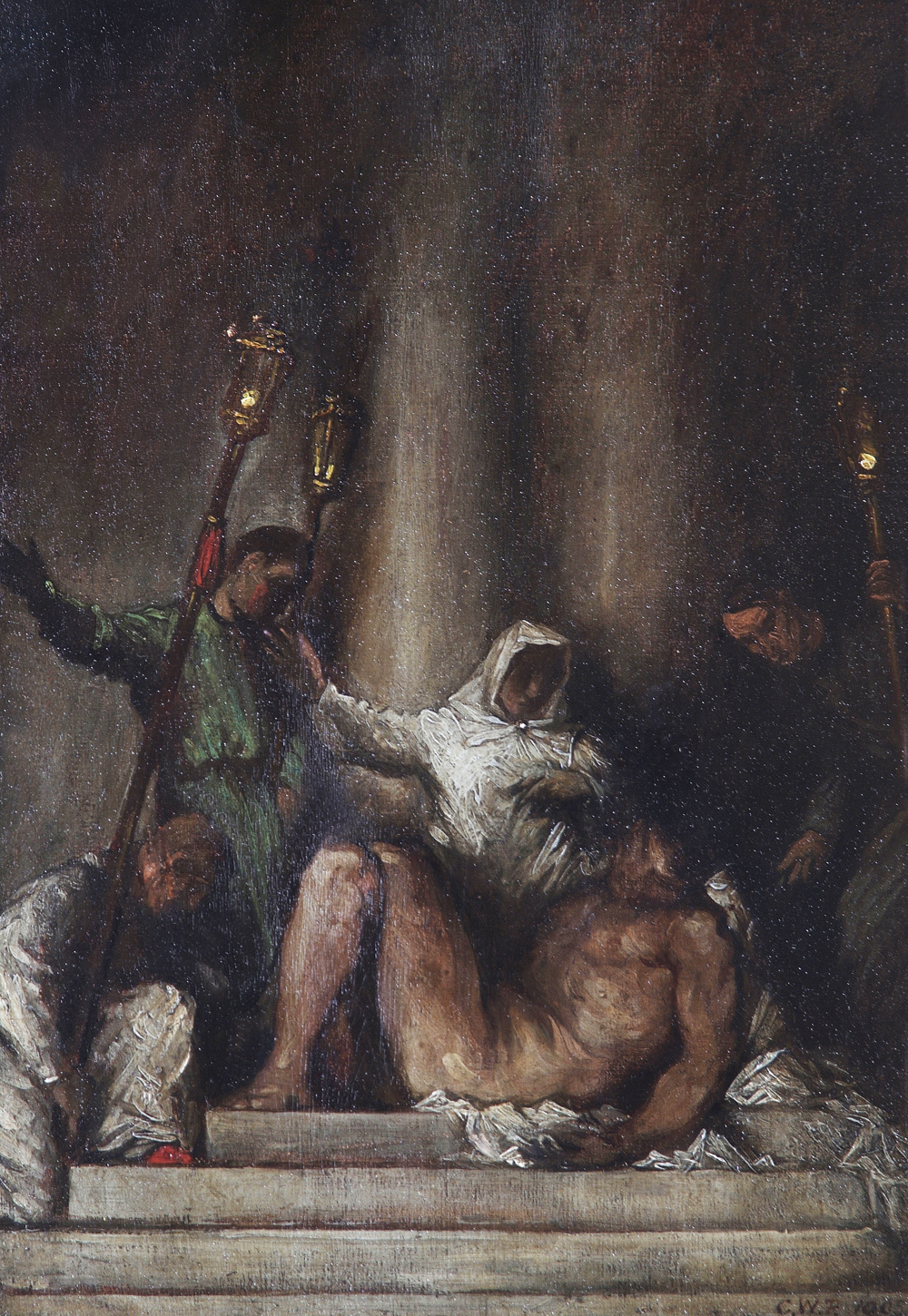
Pietà, 1905

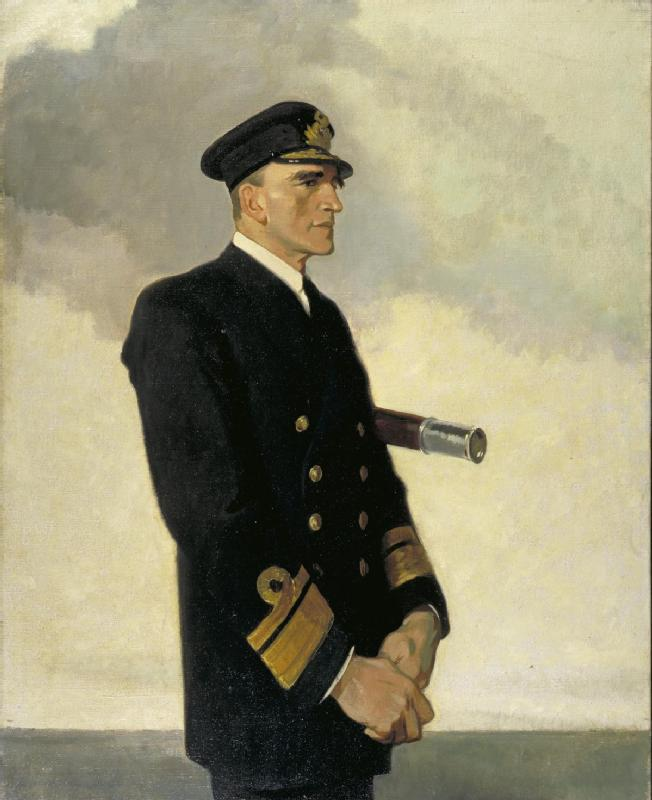
Reginald Tyrwhitt, 1918

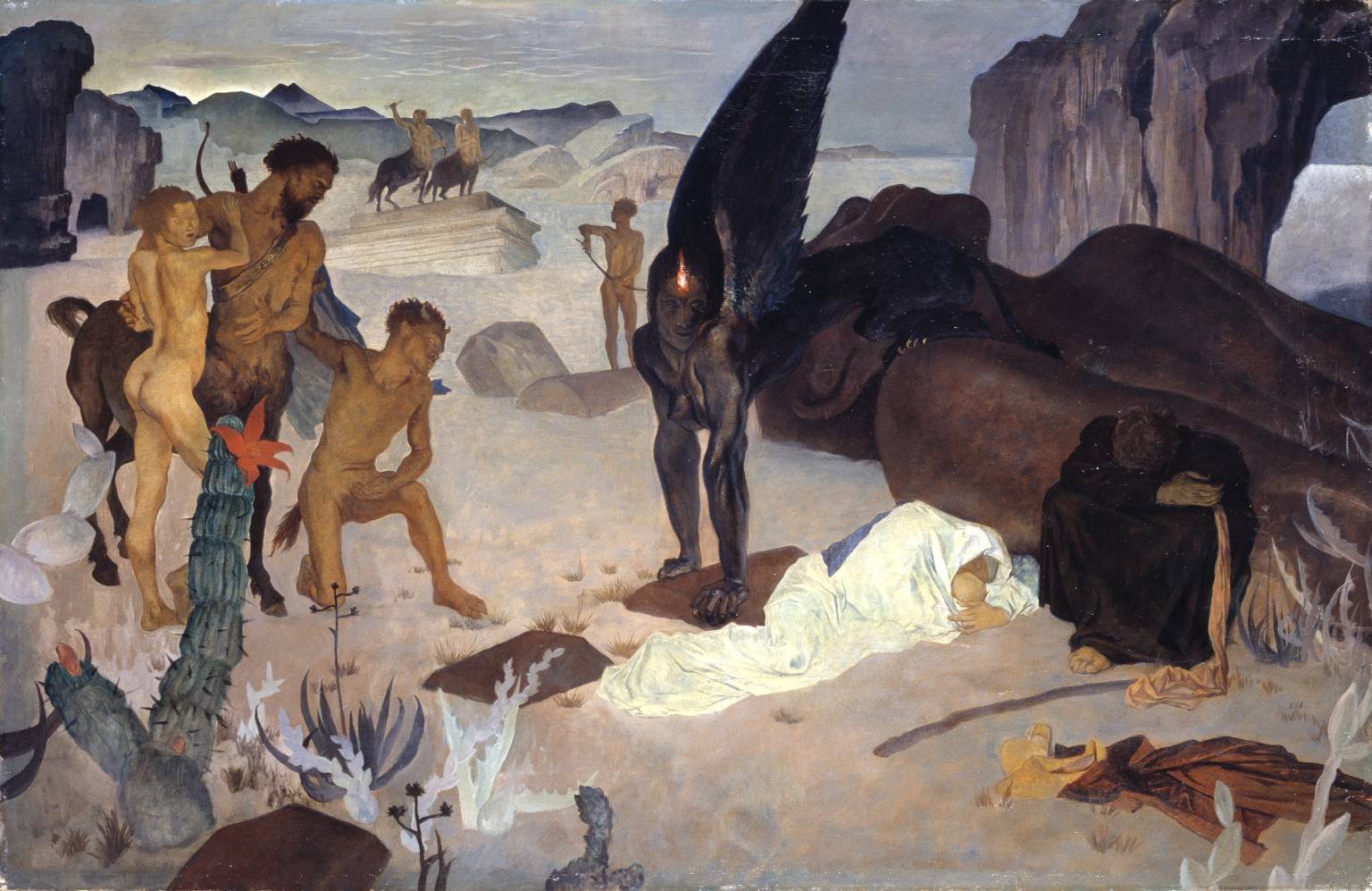
Repose on the Flight into Egypt, 1922

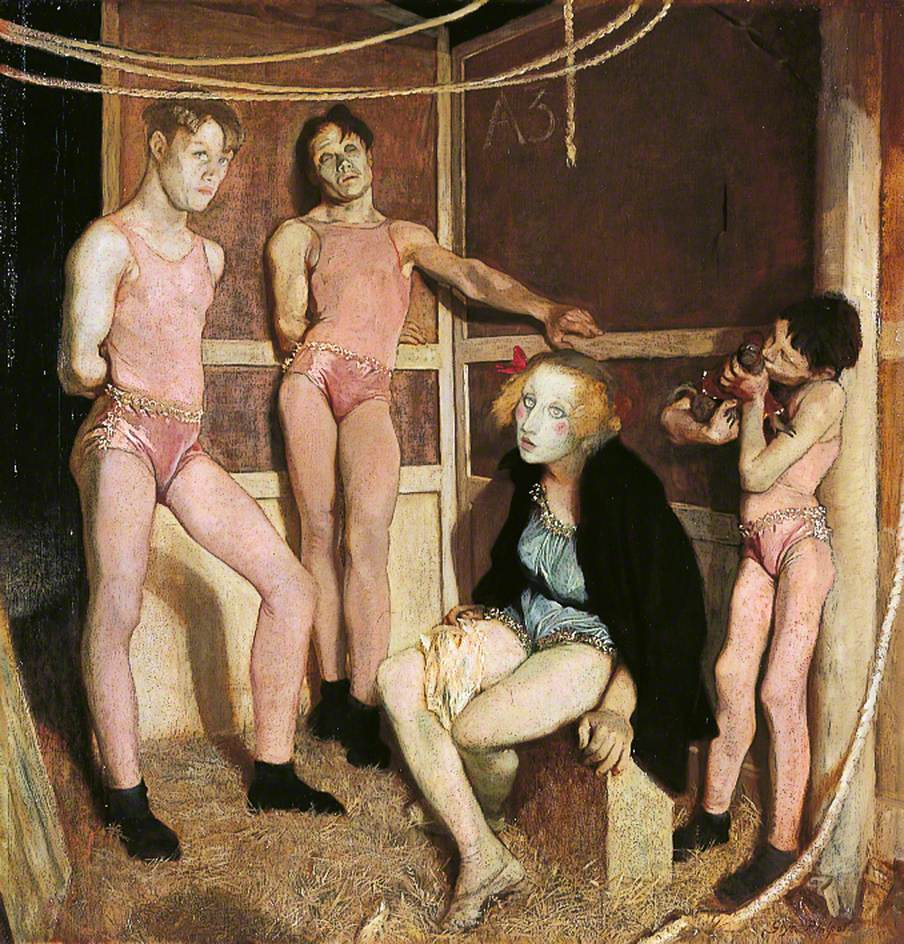
Resting Acrobats

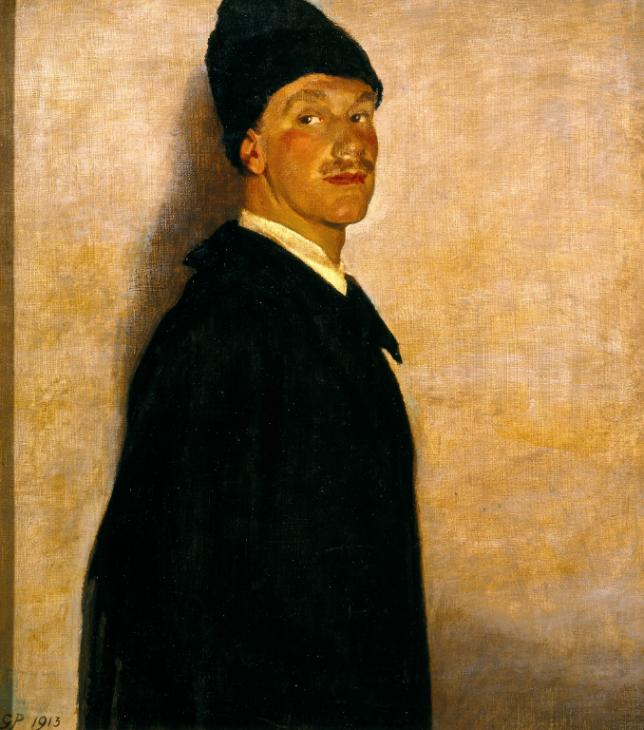
The Man in Black (Robert Allerton), 1913

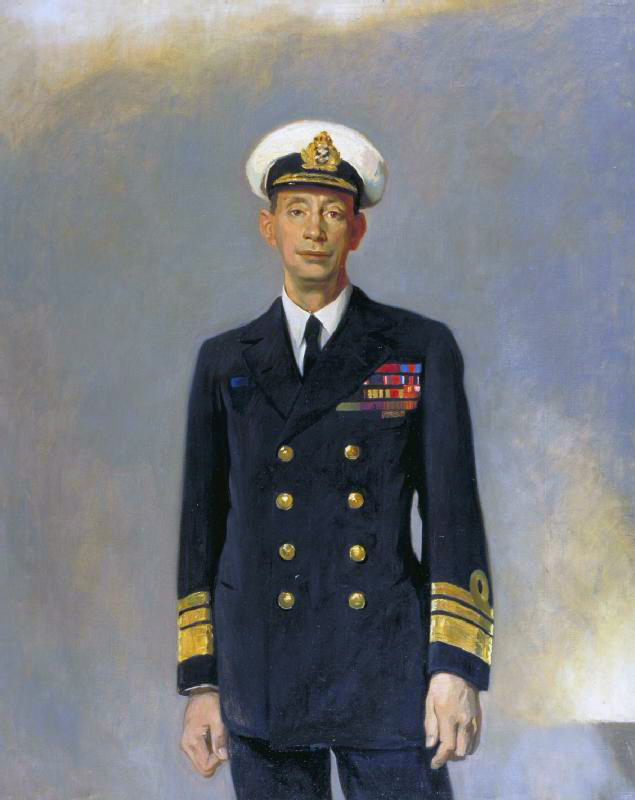
Roger Keyes, 1st Baron Keyes, 1918

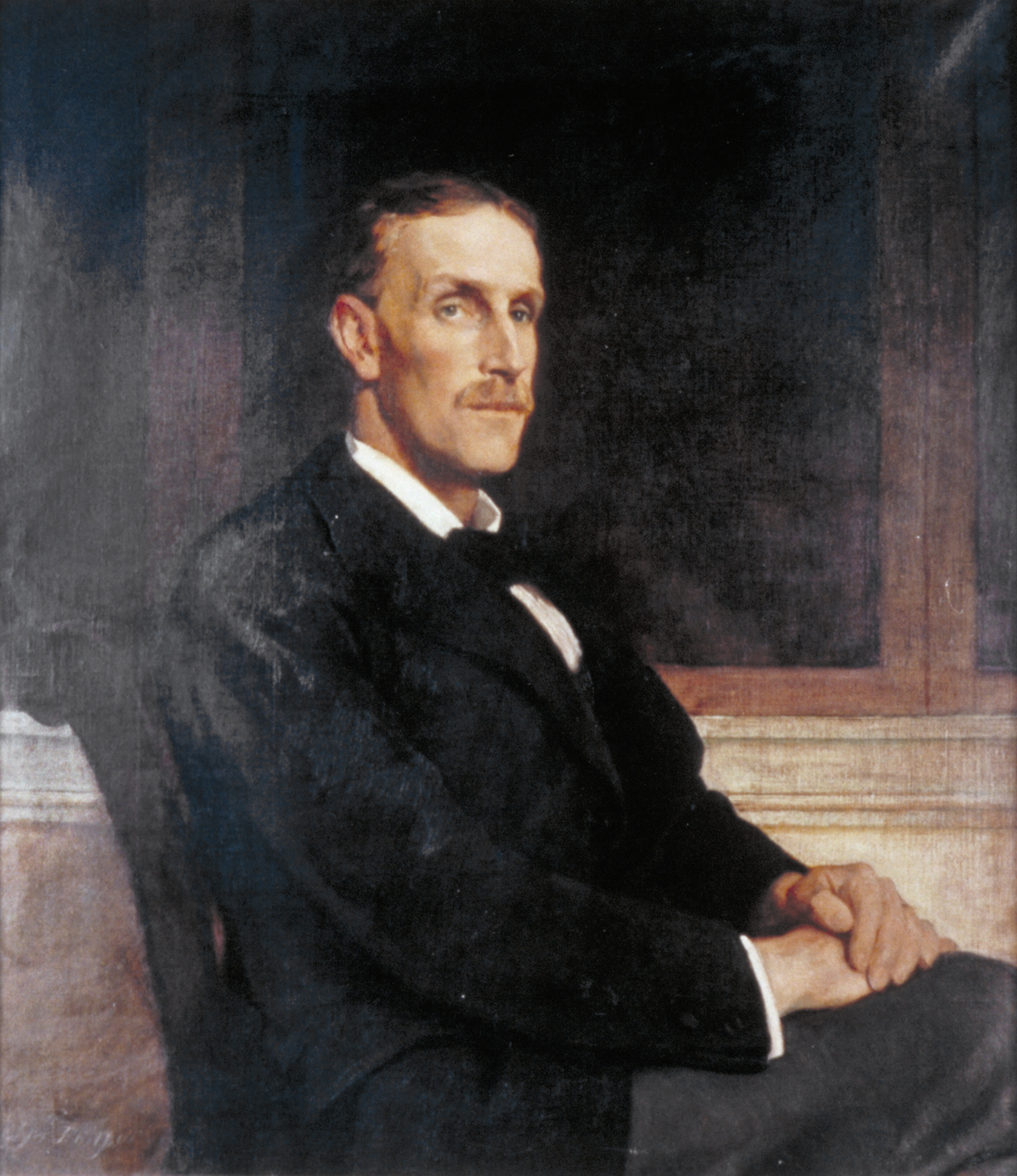
Ronald Collet Norman

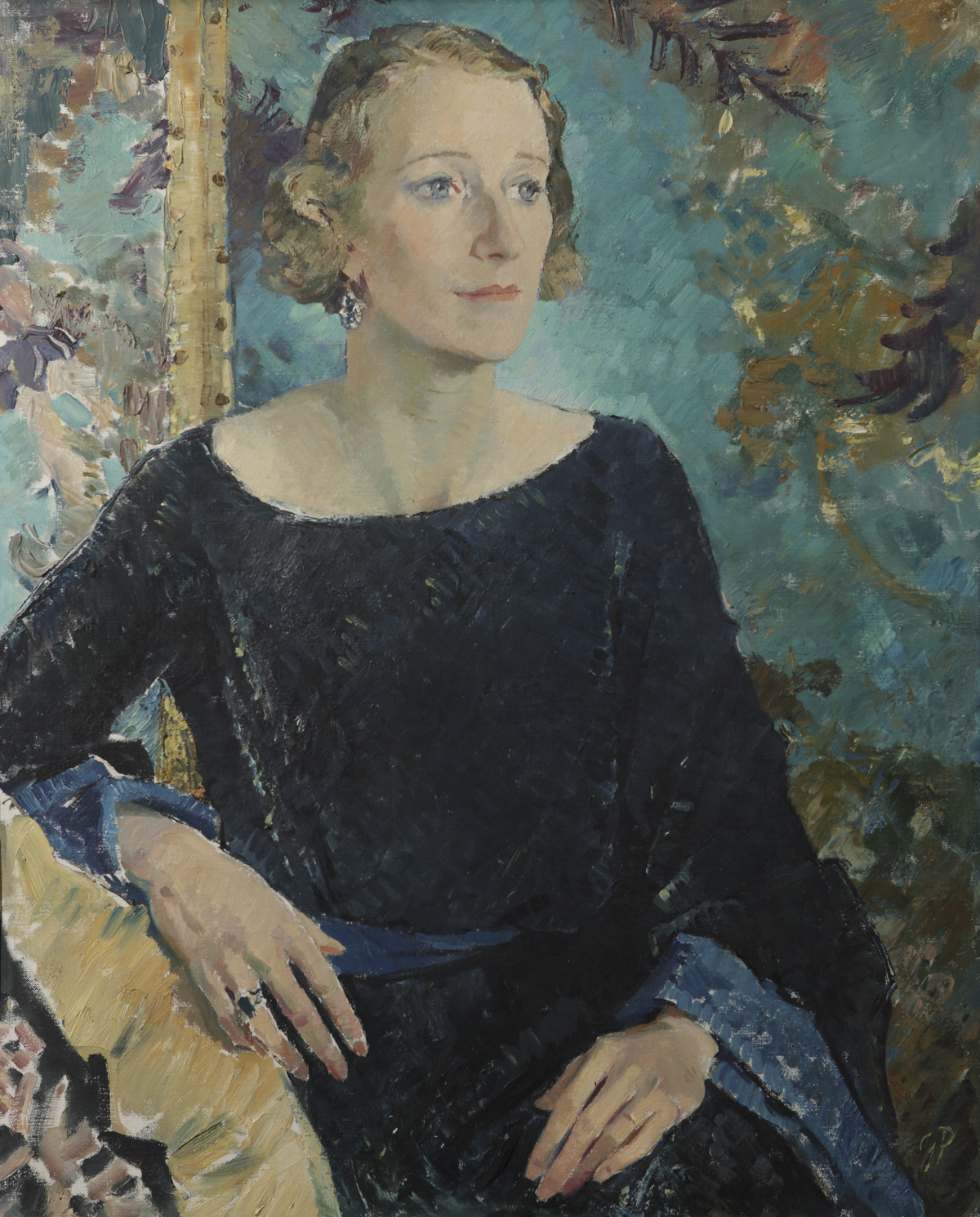
The Honourable Ruth Cable, Lady Benthall, 1935

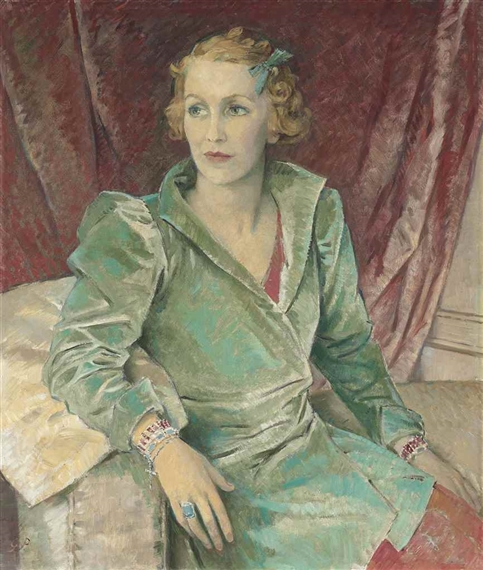
Lady Benthall (Ruth Cable), ca 1935

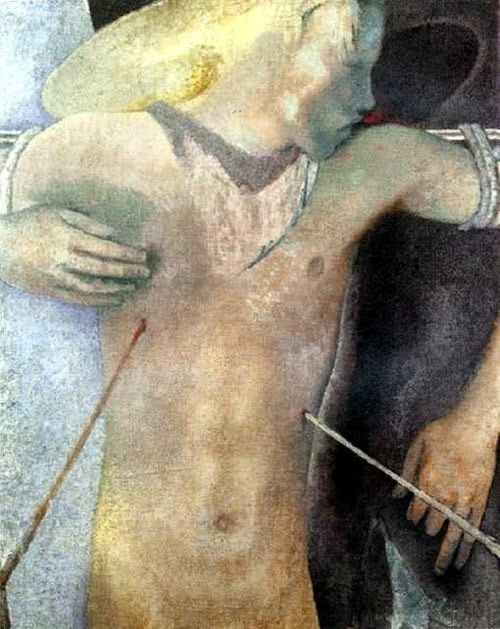
Saint-Sébastien, 1932

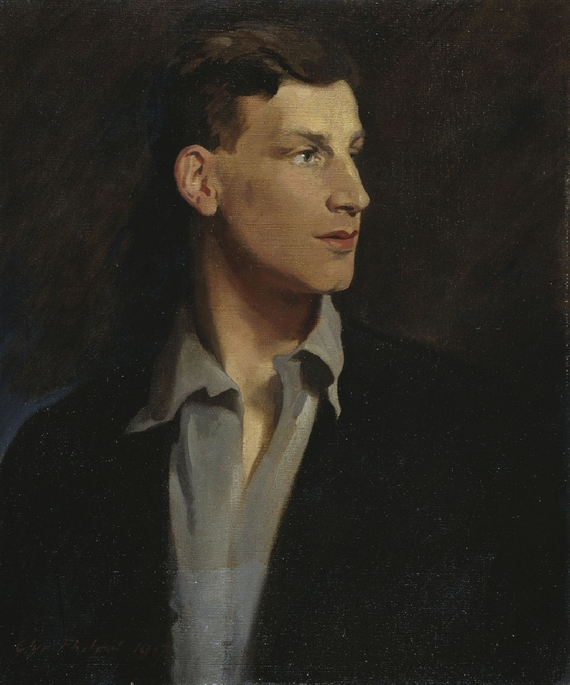
Siegfried Sassoon

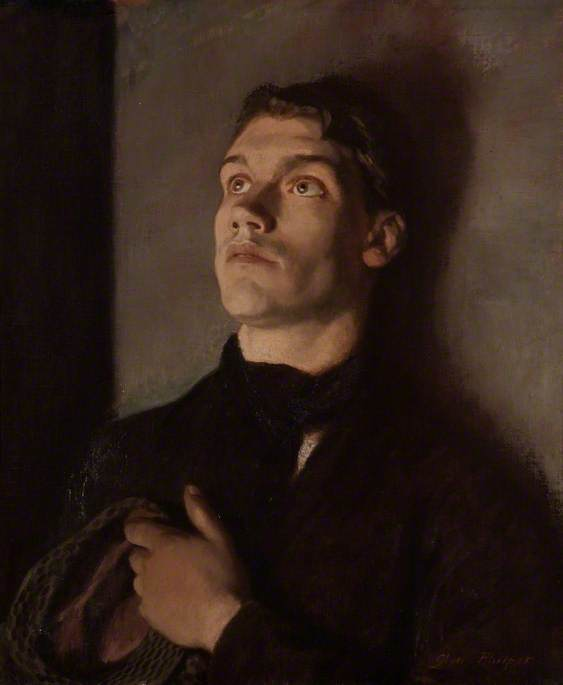
The Skyscraper, 1916

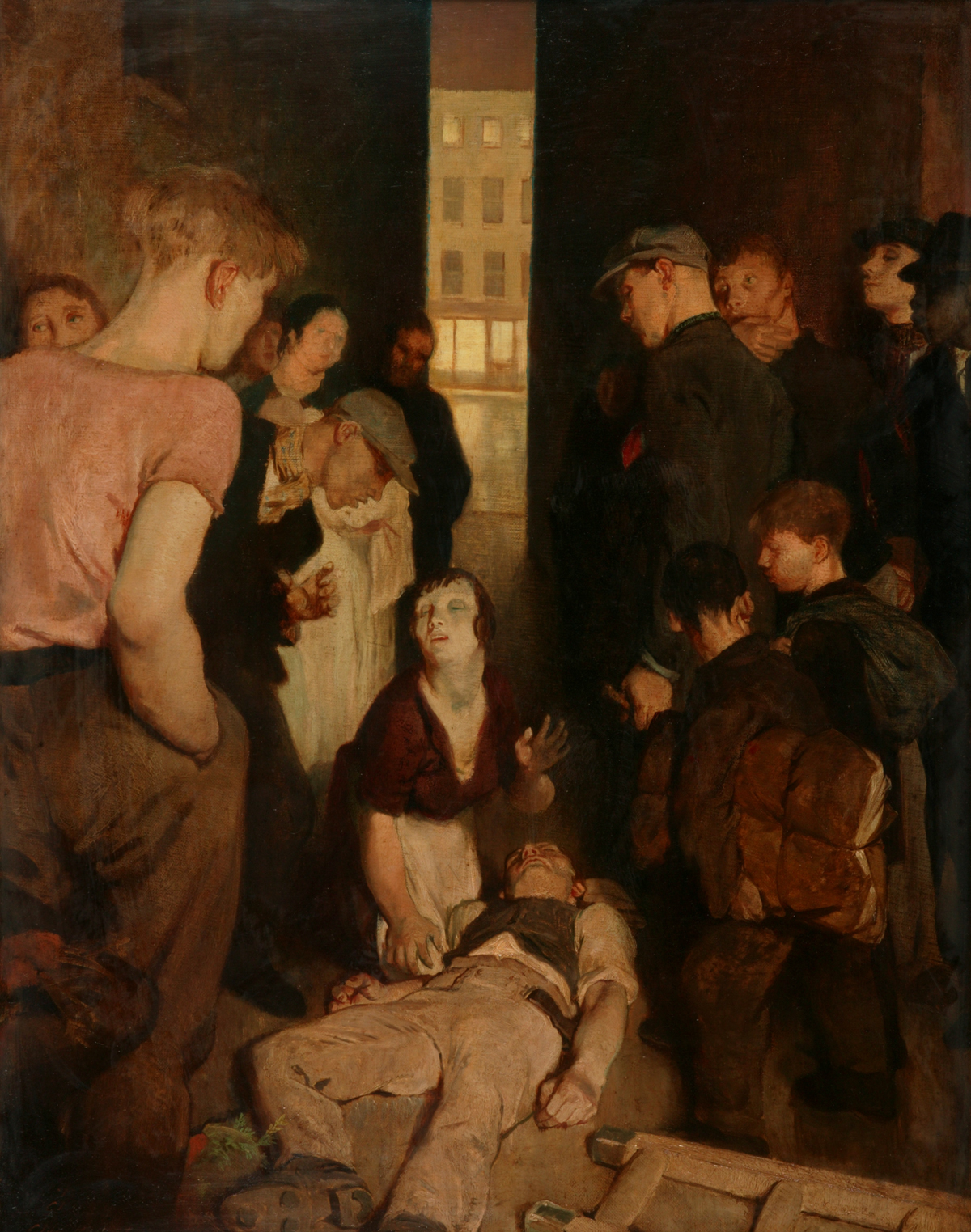
A Street Accident, 1925

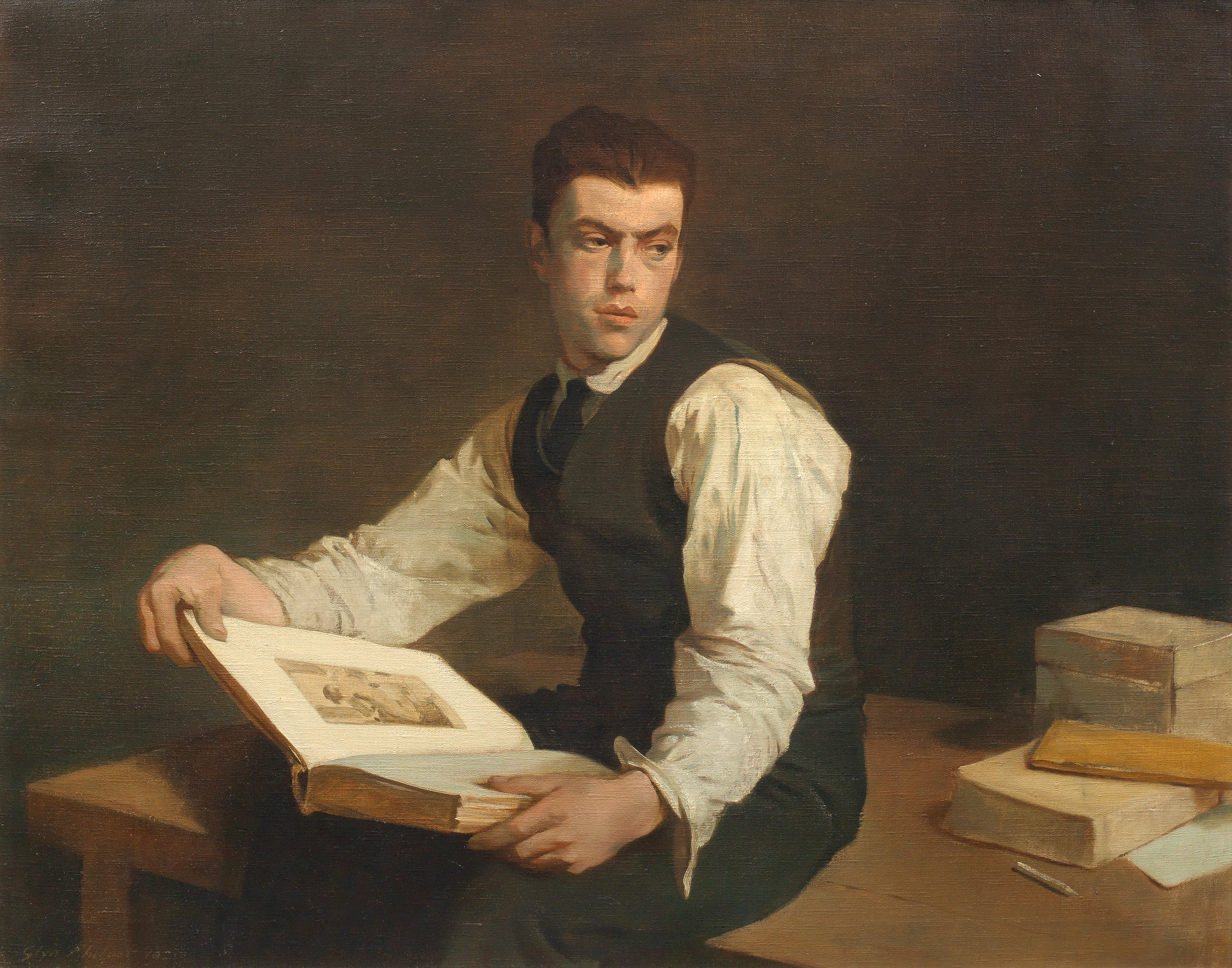
Student with a Book

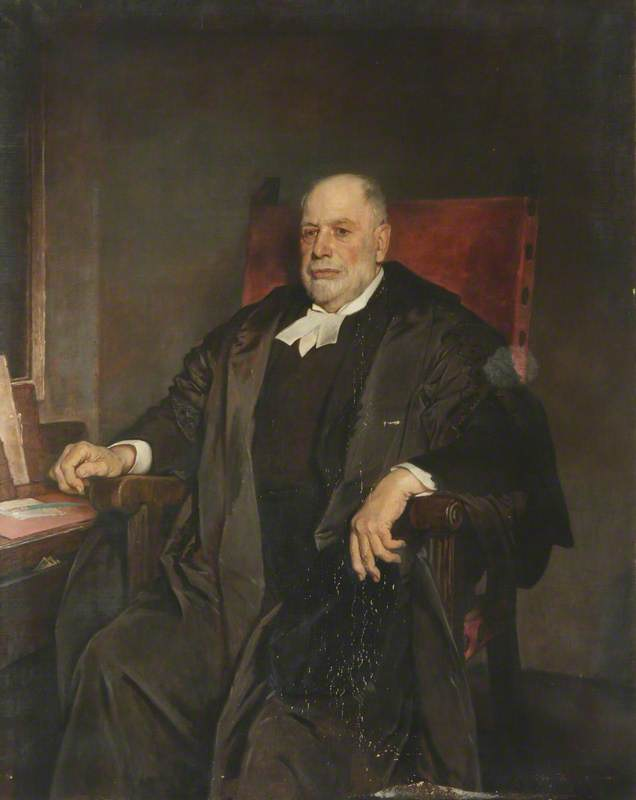
Sir Thomas Herbert Warren

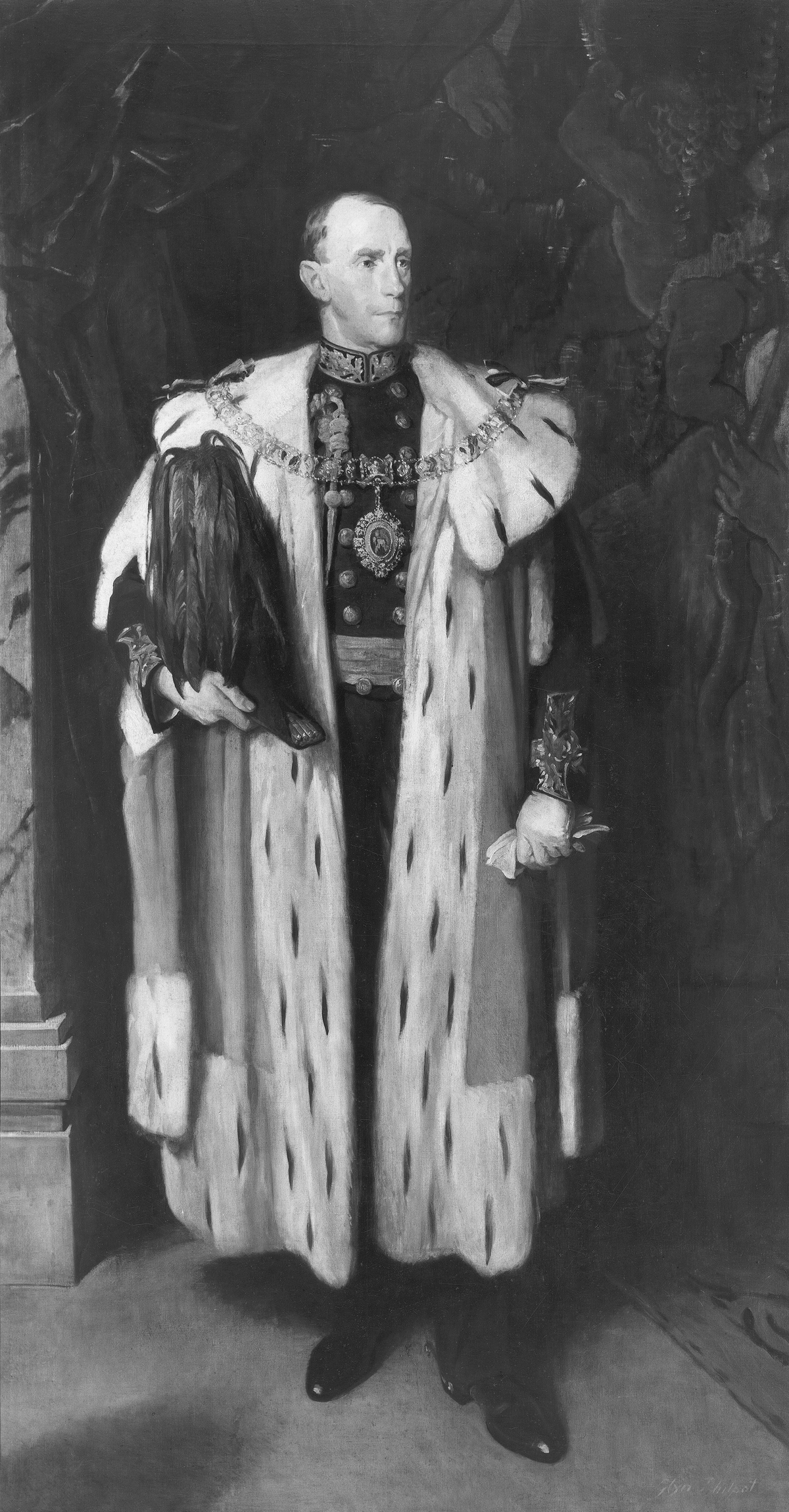
Sir Thomas Hutchison, Lord Provost of Edinburgh (1921-1923)

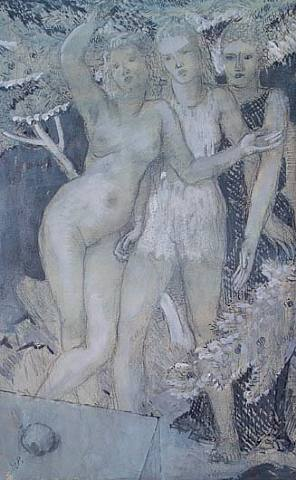
The Three Eves

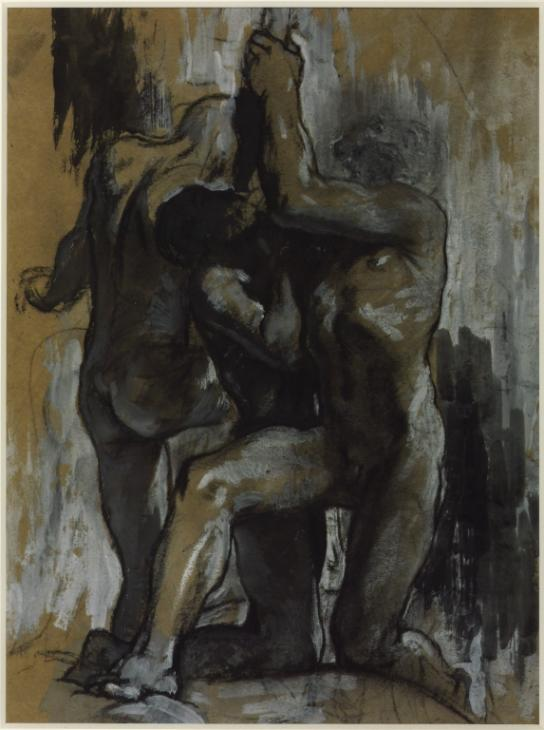
Three Figures, ca 1921

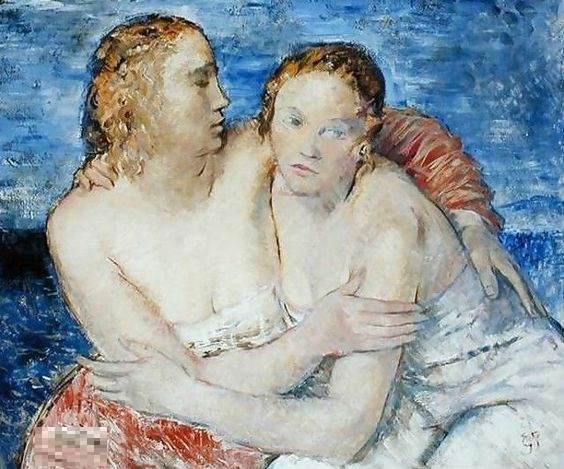
Two Girls, a Portrait of the Artists Nieces, 1934–37

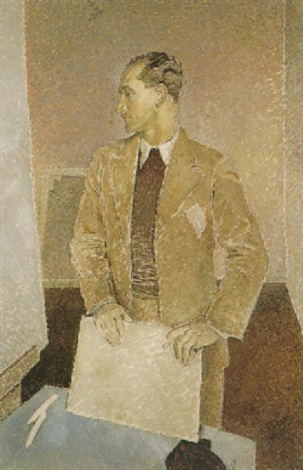
Vivian Forbes

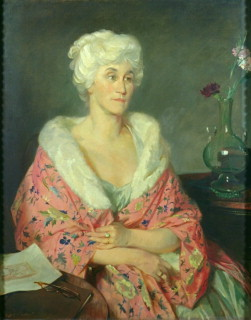
Portrait of Lady Robert Witt (Mary Helene Marten)

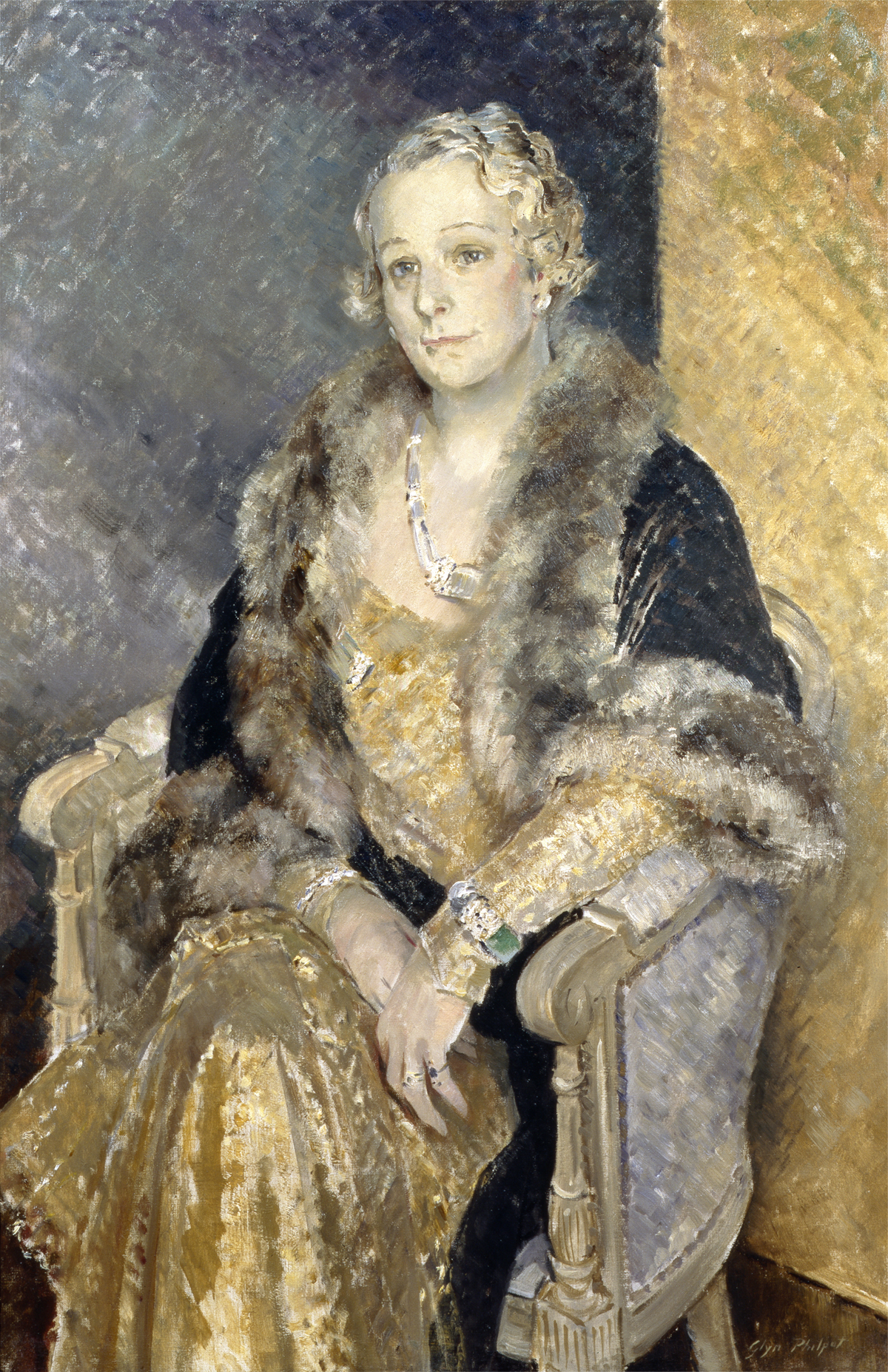
Mrs Woolmer, 1933–34

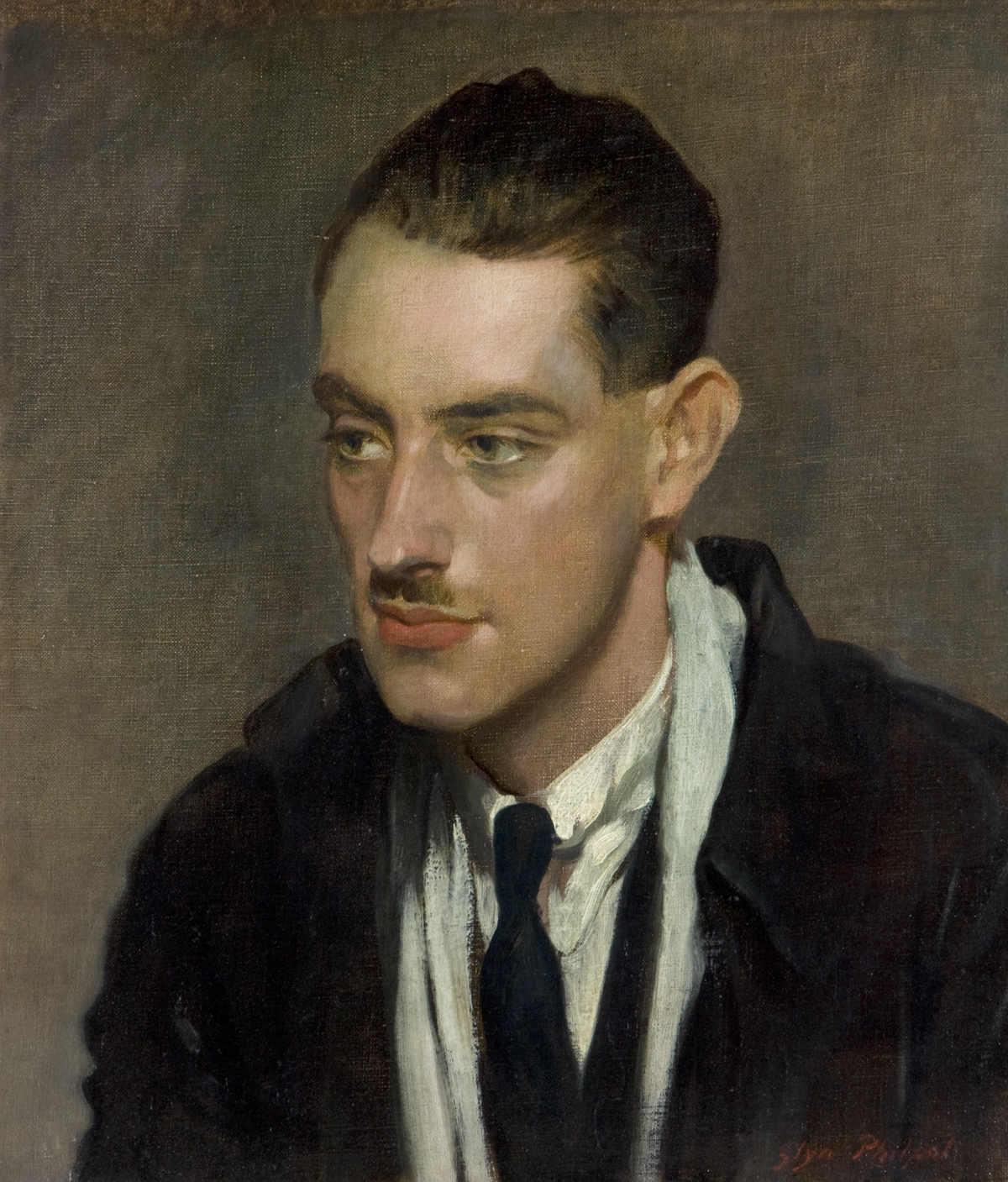
Portrait of a Young Man, ca 1920

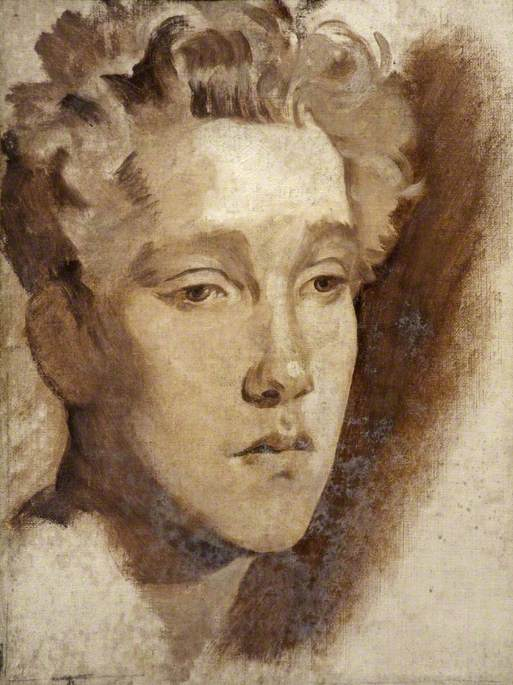
Study of a Young Man

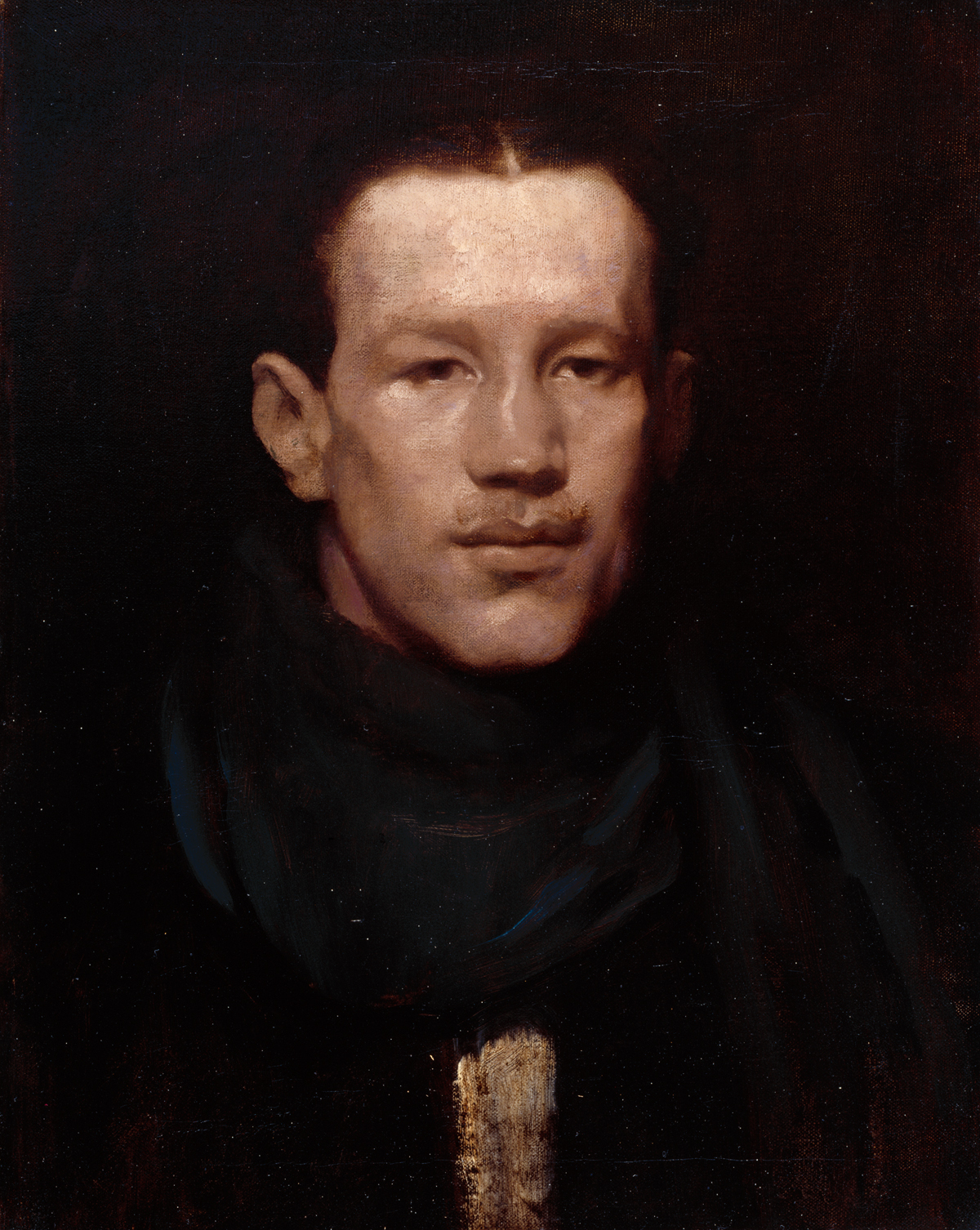
Portrait of a Young Man, ca 1921

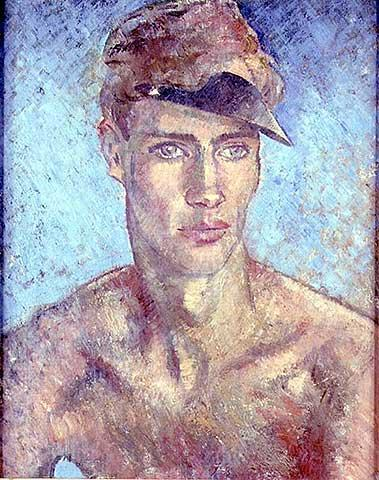
Young Man Wearing a Sun Visor
