= Huntington, Hereford =

Suburb of Hereford in Herefordshire, England

Coordinates: 52.073109°N 2.752066°W

Huntington
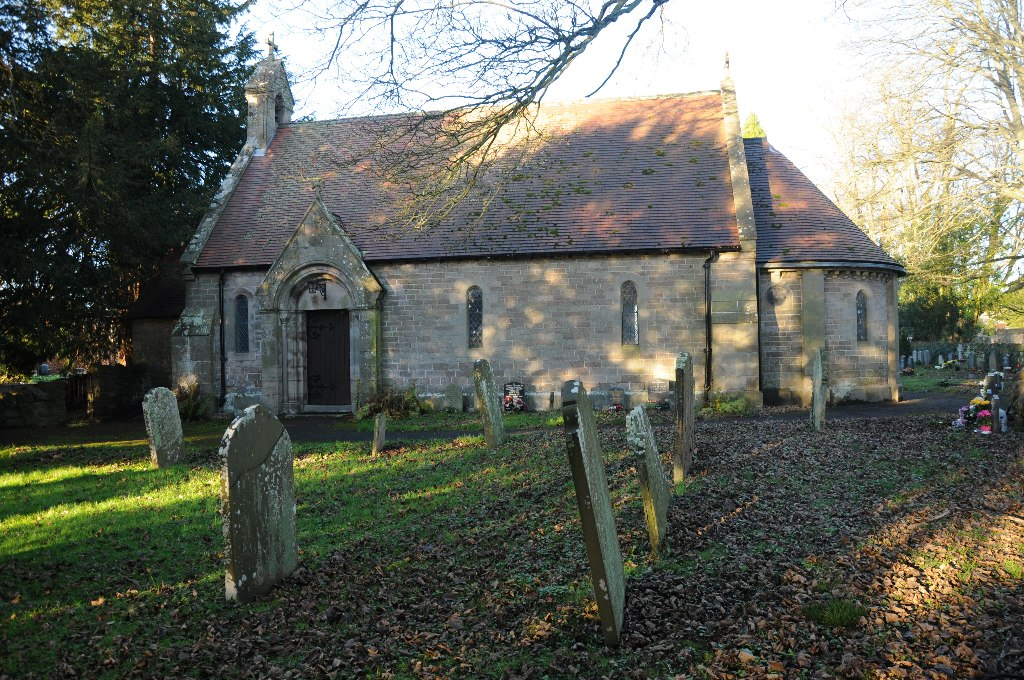
- Saint Mary Magdalene Church, Huntington

- Location within Herefordshire
- Civil parish: Hereford
- Unitary authority: Herefordshire
- Ceremonial county: Herefordshire
- Region: West Midlands
- Country: England
- Sovereign state: United Kingdom
- Post town: Hereford
- Postcode district: HR4
- Dialling code: 01432
- Police: West Mercia
- Fire: Hereford and Worcester
- Ambulance: West Midlands
- UK Parliament: Hereford

Huntington is a village in the civil parish of Hereford, in Herefordshire, England. It is located west of the city centre and within the Kings Acre ward of Hereford City Council.

== History ==
Huntington was formerly a township and chapelry in the parish of Holmer, in 1866 Huntington became a separate civil parish, on 1 October 1932 the parish was abolished to form Hereford. In 1931 the parish had a population of 137. Until 1998 it was in Hereford district.

== St Mary Magdalene Church ==
Huntington is the location of St Mary Magdalene Church which is within the Church of England parish of Holmer with Huntington. The church is a grade II listed building.

== Geography ==
Huntington is located in a unique position on the western side of Hereford, and is only accessible by a single road, Huntington Lane. The road starts southwards at a junction with the A438 road at Kings Acre and then proceeds through the centre of the hamlet before curving slightly to the north and meeting the A4410 road. This makes it the only settlement in Hereford with a single-access road.
