= Belmont Rural =

Suburb and ward of Hereford in Herefordshire, England

Coordinates: 52.041414°N 2.742395°W

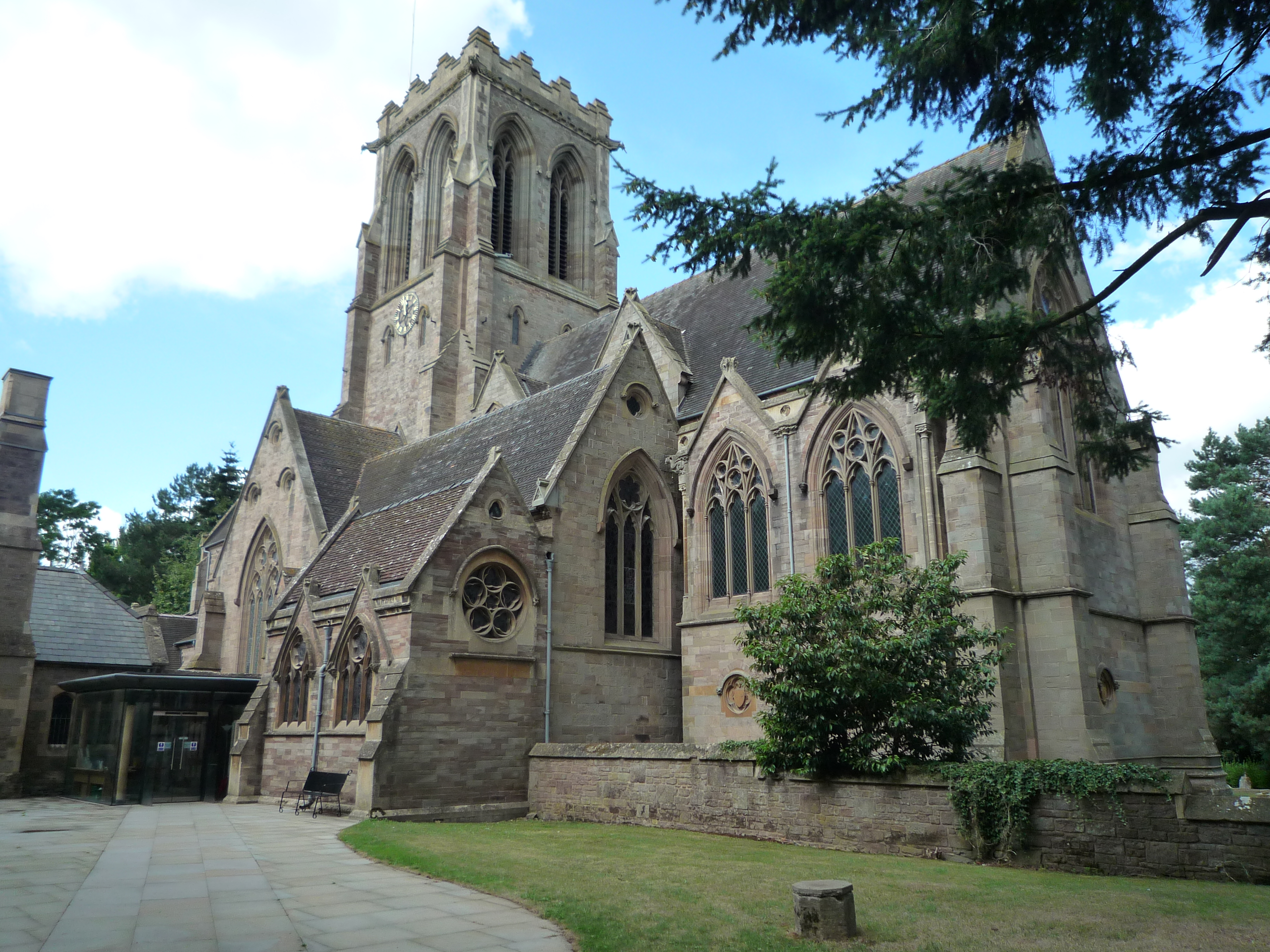
- Belmont Abbey

- Location within Herefordshire
- Population: 3,656 2021 Census
  - London: 143 mi (230 km) SSE
- Civil parish: Hereford
- Unitary authority: Herefordshire
- Ceremonial county: Herefordshire
- Region: West Midlands
- Country: England
- Sovereign state: United Kingdom
- Post town: Hereford
- Postcode district: HR2
- Dialling code: 01342
- Police: West Mercia
- Fire: Hereford and Worcester
- Ambulance: West Midlands
- UK Parliament: Hereford

Belmont Rural is a large village and civil parish in the ceremonial county of Herefordshire, England. It is conjoined to the suburbs of Hinton and Hunderton and Newton Farm of Hereford. The population of Belmont Rural at the 2021 Census was recorded at 3,656. The village is also part of the wider Hereford Urban Area, which had a population of 60,475 at the 2021 Census. The village is notable for its Abbey Church, which is a grade II* listed building on the southwestern side of the village.
