= Tupsley =

Suburb of Hereford in Herefordshire, England

Coordinates: 52.054097°N 2.687005°W

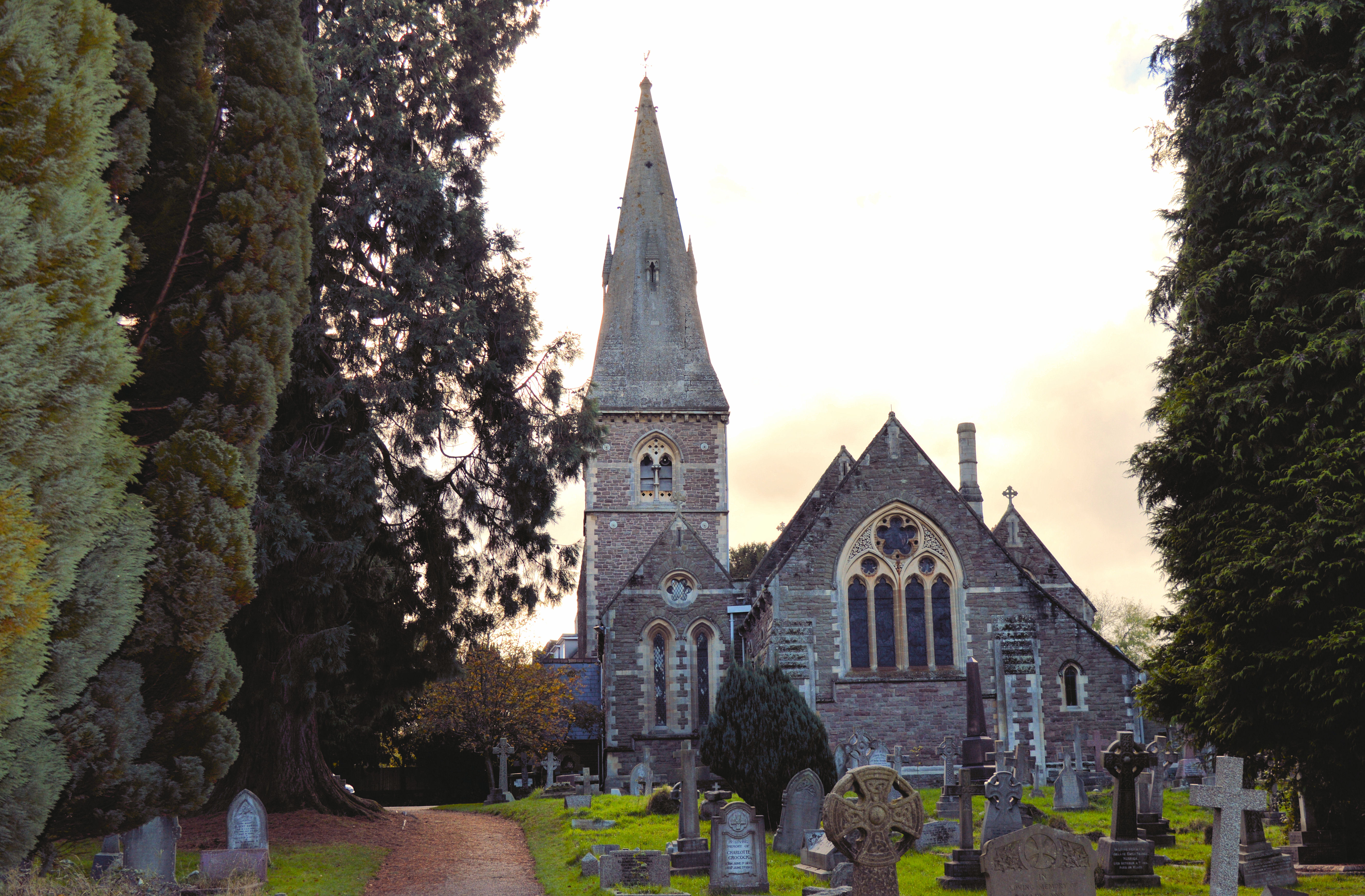
- St Paul's Church, Tupsley, Hereford

- Location within Herefordshire
- Population: 3,075 Ward Area Profile, 2021 Census
- Civil parish: Hereford
- Unitary authority: Herefordshire
- Ceremonial county: Herefordshire
- Region: West Midlands
- Country: England
- Sovereign state: United Kingdom
- Post town: Hereford
- Postcode district: HR1
- Dialling code: 01432
- Police: West Mercia
- Fire: Hereford and Worcester
- Ambulance: West Midlands
- UK Parliament: Hereford

Tupsley is a historic village, ward and suburb of the city of Hereford in Herefordshire, England. It is located southeast of the city centre and close to the River Wye. Tupsley is surrounded by the suburbs of Bartonsham, Eign Hill, and The Hamptons. The population of the ward at the 2021 Census was recorded at 3,075. It is one of the sixteen wards of Hereford City Council. It is represented by Cllr Jim Kenyon.

== History ==
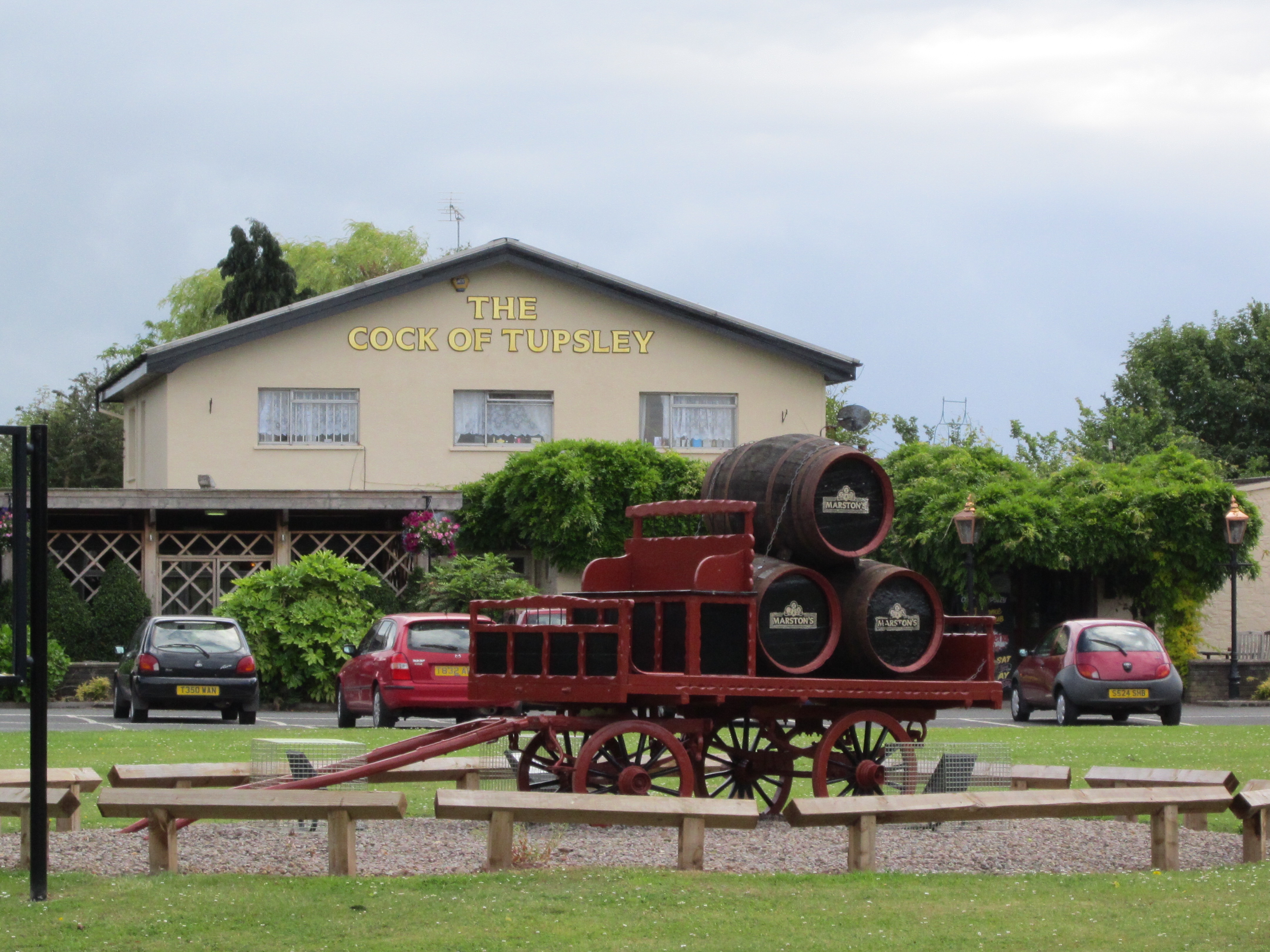
The Cock of Tupsley Pub, Tupsley, Hereford

Tupsley was described in 1870-72 as a small village within Herefordshire and close to the city of Hereford. John Marius Wilson's 1870-1872 Imperial Gazetteer of England and Wales says:

"TUPSLEY, a township-chapelry in Bishop-Hampton parish, Herefordshire; 2 miles E of Hereford r. station. Post town, Hereford. Real property, £5,247. Pop., 802. Houses, 149. The living is a p. curacy in the diocese of Hereford. Value, £240.* Patron, the Bishop of H. The church was built in 1866."

In 1866 Tupsley became a separate civil parish, on 1 October 1932 the parish was abolished to form Hereford. In 1931 the parish had a population of 1455. Until 1998 it was in Hereford district.

The village remained separate from the wider Hereford area until after the Second World War when it was then merged into the city's wider wards and represented in both the counties of Hereford and Worcester and Herefordshire under Hereford City Council. Today, the village is now merged with Bartonsham, Eign Hill, and The Hamptons areas of Hereford.

== St Paul's Church ==
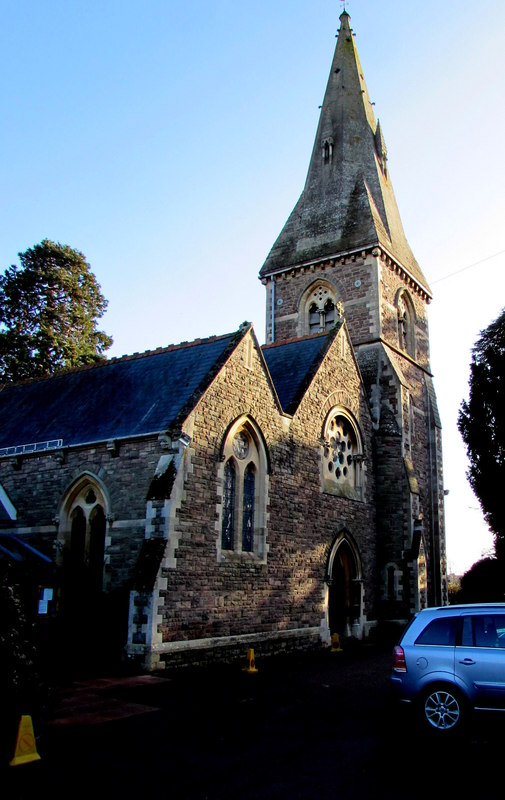
St Paul's Church, Tupsley's Parish Church

A notable landmark of Tupsley is the church of St Paul's. It was first built in 1865 by local architect, FR Kempson who lived in Holme Lacy and had built certain notable buildings in his life. The church of St Paul's being one of them. The church is designated as a Grade II listed building by Historic England. The church remains an active place of worship on Church Road, Tupsley.

== Amenities ==
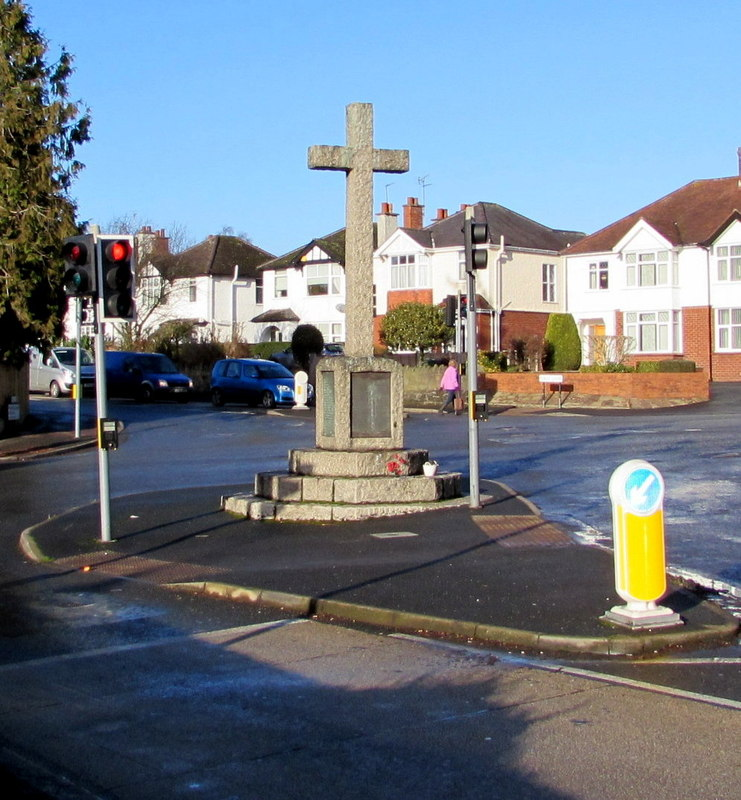
Tupsley War Memorial Cross

Tupsley has a small shopping centre on Old Eign Hill and there are also some shops on Ledbury Road to the north.

== Transport ==
The village has frequent bus services to Hereford and Ledbury among other destinations.

== Demographics ==
At the 2011 census, the population of Eign Hill's ward profile was 3,075. Of the findings, the ethnicity and religious composition of the ward were:

Tupsley: Ethnicity: 2021 Census
Ethnic group	Population	%
White	2,943	95.7%
Asian or Asian British	73	2.4%
Mixed	34	1.1%
Arab	11	0.4%
Black or Black British	7	0.2%
Other Ethnic Group	6	0.2%
Total	3,075	100%

The religious composition of Tupsley's ward at the 2021 Census was recorded as:

Tupsley: Religion: 2021 Census
Religious	Population	%
Christian	1,824	64.5%
Irreligious	953	33.7%
Muslim	22	0.8%
Buddhist	11	0.4%
Hindu	9	0.3%
Other religion	8	0.3%
Total	3,075	100%
