= Bartonsham =

Suburb of Hereford in Herefordshire, England

Coordinates: 52.051°N 2.706°W

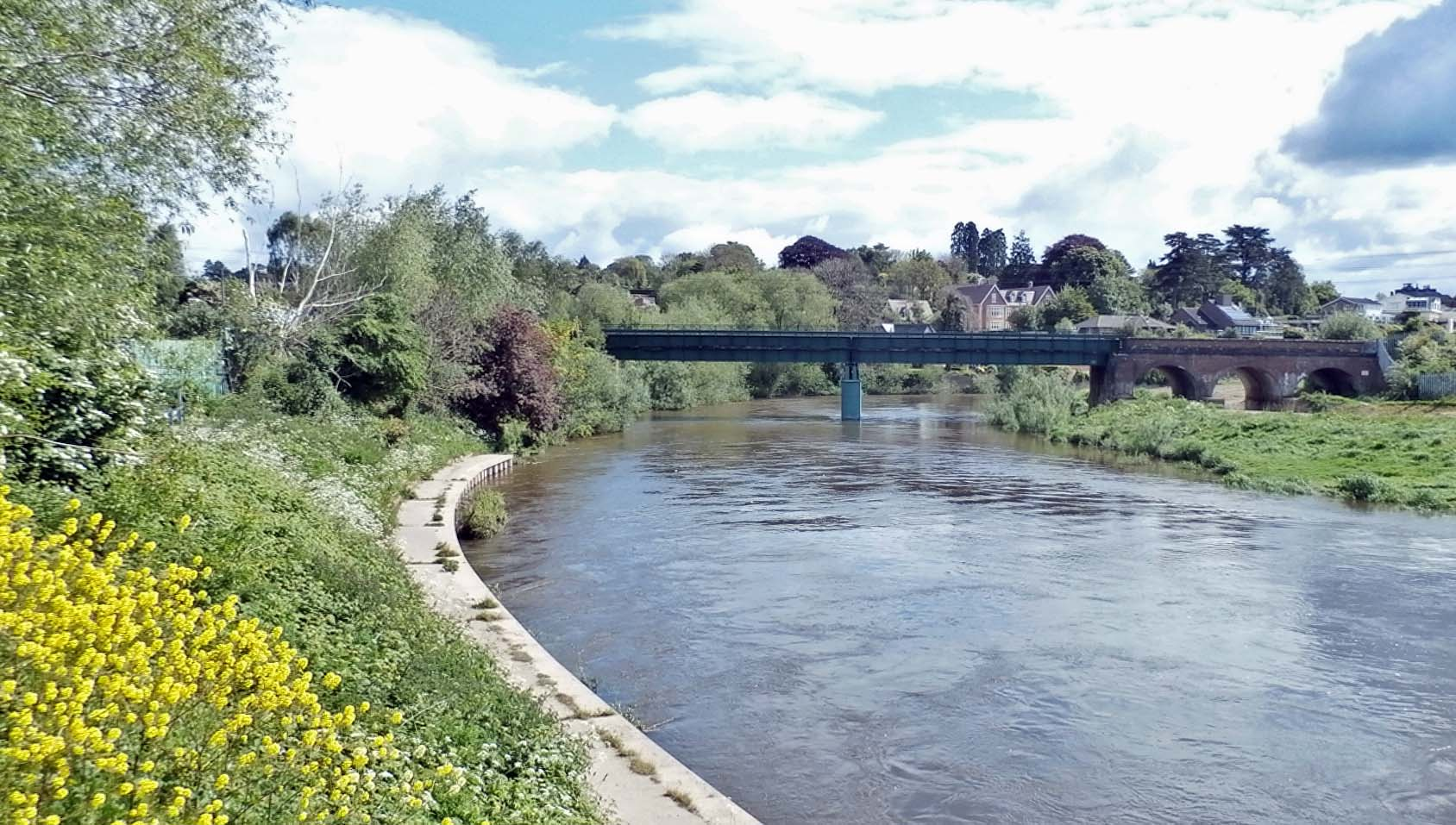
- Railway Bridge near Bartonsham, Hereford

- Location within Herefordshire
- Population: Central Ward Area Profile
- Civil parish: Hereford
- Unitary authority: Herefordshire
- Ceremonial county: Herefordshire
- Region: West Midlands
- Country: England
- Sovereign state: United Kingdom
- Post town: Hereford
- Postcode district: HR1
- Dialling code: 01432
- Police: West Mercia
- Fire: Hereford and Worcester
- Ambulance: West Midlands
- UK Parliament: Hereford

Bartonsham is an inner city suburb of the city of Hereford in Herefordshire, England. It is located southeast of the city centre on the River Wye. It is bounded by Hereford City Centre, Eign Hill, The Hamptons and Tupsley. It is part of the Central Ward.

== Bartonsham meadows ==
The water meadows enclosed by a meander of the River Wye are owned by the Church Commissioners. They were used for grazing until 2023 and were then leased for 25 years to the Herefordshire Wildlife Trust which is restoring the land as a nature reserve.

== St James' Church ==
St James' Church, built in 1869 and restored in 1903 after a fire, is grade II listed. It is part of a joint ecclesiastical parish with the grade II* listed St Peter's church in the city centre.

An earlier church, St Owen's, dated from the 11th century but was destroyed in 1645 during the Siege of Hereford. St James's church was built when the population of this part of the city expanded rapidly in the second half of the 19th century.
