= Hereford Barton railway station =

Former railway station in Hereford, England

Hereford Barton

General information
- Location: Hereford, Herefordshire; England
- Coordinates: 52.0564°N 2.7246°W
- Grid reference: SO504400

Other information
- Status: Disused

History
- Original company: Newport, Abergavenny and Hereford Railway
- Pre-grouping: Great Western Railway

Key dates
- 2 January 1854: Opened
- 2 January 1893: Closed
Location

Hereford Barton railway station was a railway station that served the Broomy Hill and Greyfriars area of the city of Hereford in Herefordshire, England.

== History ==
The station was opened on 2 January 1854 and closed on 2 January 1893. The station was demolished in 1913.

== Stationmasters ==
- John Walker 1853 - 1880
- John H. Cotterall ca. 1881
- Thomas Jones 1891 - 1900 (afterwards station master at Abergavenny)
- Charles James Field 1901 - 1906

| Preceding station | Historical railways | Following station |
|---|---|---|
| Tram Inn; Line and station closed | Great Western Railway; Newport, Abergavenny and Hereford Railway | Hereford; Line closed, station open |
