= Hereford City Council elections =

Hereford City Council elections are held every four years. The current Hereford City Council was established in 2000 as a parish council, following the abolition in 1998 of the former district council that had also been called Hereford City Council.

== Political control ==
Hereford was an ancient borough and had held city status from time immemorial. Hereford City Council had its powers significantly reformed in 1974 under the Local Government Act 1972, becoming a non-metropolitan district, although retaining the same boundaries.

Political control of the council from 1974 until the district was abolished in 1998 was as follows:

Party in control	Years
No overall control	1974–1980
Liberal	1980–1981
Alliance	1981–1988
SLD	1988–1989
Liberal Democrats	1989–1998

In 1998 the district of Hereford was abolished, with the area becoming part of the new unitary authority of Herefordshire. The Herefordshire councillors who represented the former district of Hereford acted as charter trustees from 1998 until 2000, when a civil parish covering the former district was formed, with its parish council taking the name Hereford City Council. As a parish council rather than a district council, the post-2000 city council has fewer powers and responsibilities than the pre-1998 city council had.

== Council elections ==
Elections to the non-metropolitan district council which existed from 1974 to 1998 were generally held three years out of every four, with a third of the council elected each time.

- 1973 Hereford City Council election
- 1976 Hereford City Council election
- 1979 Hereford City Council election (New ward boundaries)
- 1980 Hereford City Council election
- 1982 Hereford City Council election
- 1983 Hereford City Council election
- 1984 Hereford City Council election
- 1986 Hereford City Council election
- 1987 Hereford City Council election
- 1988 Hereford City Council election
- 1990 Hereford City Council election
- 1991 Hereford City Council election
- 1992 Hereford City Council election
- 1994 Hereford City Council election
- 1995 Hereford City Council election
- 1996 Hereford City Council election
