= Rotherwas Chapel =

Coordinates: 52.0412°N 2.6774°W

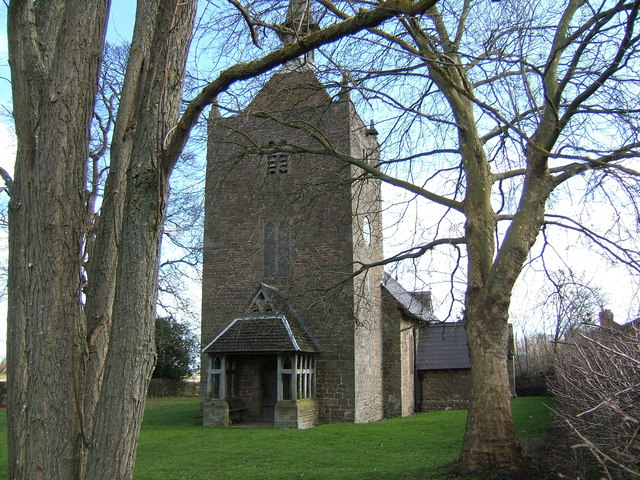
Rotherwas Chapel

Rotherwas Chapel is a family chapel, once belonging to the Bodenham family. It is now state-owned and administered by English Heritage. The chapel contains structures from medieval, Elizabethan, Georgian and Victorian periods. The originally simple medieval building has a fine Elizabethan timber roof, a rebuilt 18th-century tower, and striking Victorian interior decoration with furnishings by the Pugins.

It is located near Hereford, Herefordshire, England and maintained by English Heritage.
