= Museum of Cider =

Museum in Hereford, England

Coordinates: 52.0561°N 2.7264°W

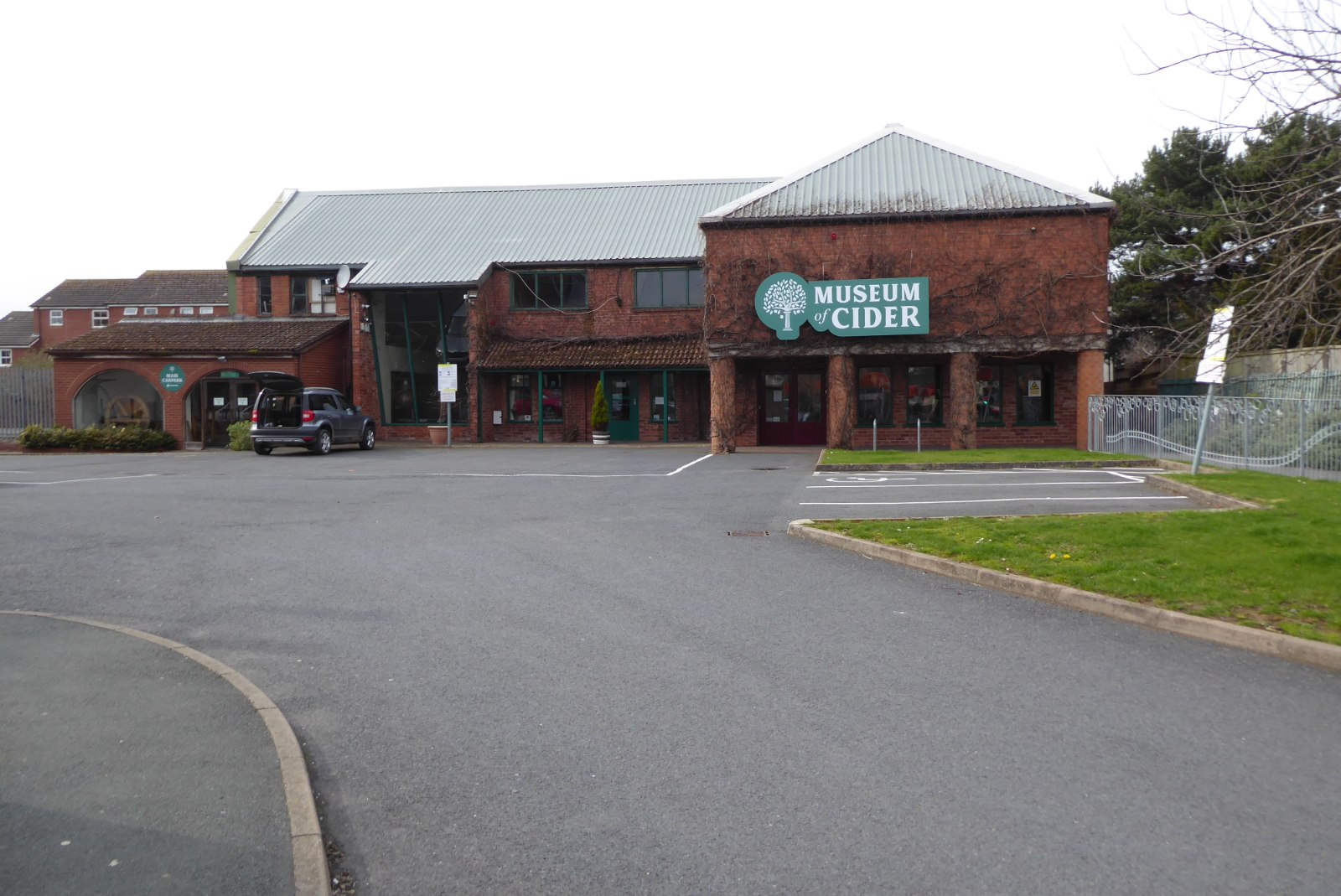
The museum building

The Museum of Cider, formerly the Cider Museum, is a museum in Hereford, England, about the history of cider. The museum was set up as a Trust in the 1970s by Bertram Bulmer, Norman Weston and the Director of Long Ashton Research Station, John Hudson. They realised that unless a collection was started, then much of the story of cider making would be lost. Initially, the aim was to represent the international history of cider-making, but the majority of the collections have been drawn from England and the West Country.

The museum is housed in a former cider-making factory at Pomona Place in Hereford, which dates back to 1888. This was the birthplace of Bulmer's Cider. Henry Percival Bulmer started making cider in 1887 and was joined by his brother Fred from Cambridge. A year later they purchased a plot of ground on the outskirts of Hereford to build a 'shack' to make and store cider. Extensive cellars were later excavated in 1889 and the building was extended to incorporate both the factory and offices, with a grand new frontage added in the 1920s.

The museum is operated by the Hereford Cider Museum Trust, a registered charity.

== Opening of the museum ==
In the 1970s, the Trust undertook research into cider history, making a start on building up both the Archive of Cider Pomology and the photographs and artefacts in the collection. It undertook oral histories and did a survey of all cider mills in Herefordshire whilst searching for suitable premises. A 'pop-up' museum was created in a shop next to the Butter Market in Hereford to display the collections so far. It was finally agreed to rent the old Bulmer offices in 1978. The building was later acquired by the Hereford Cider Museum Trust. After extensive renovation work the Museum opened in 1981 portraying the history of cider making worldwide.

The front aspect which visitors see when they arrive from Pomona Place is actually the rear of the original building. To make a better entrance, the Beam Press Gallery was added in the 1980s and was built from bricks and timber from the old Godwins Cider Factory in Hereford. Presses from the factory are on display in the cellars.

The original exhibition design idea started with the orchard area, then followed through the process with the farmhouse mill display, finally covering the history and science of cider making from the 16th century onwards. The 19th century company Boardroom and the Champagne Cider Cellars show how cider making went from being a cottage industry to a major industrial process.

The museum was never the Bulmer Heritage Centre which was indeed formerly part of the factory site, but is an independent charity which raises money from admissions, events, the shop, tearoom, grants and meeting rooms. It welcomes the Bulmer's Pensioners once a month to a coffee morning in their old place of work.

However, a major part of the collection arrived in 2003 when Bulmer's was taken over by Scottish_and Newcastle and the rare collection of 18th century cider glasses came to the museum.

The museum was the first place in Britain in 200 years to obtain a licence from HMRC for distilling cider into brandy. Production ceased in 2012 but inspired Julian Temperley in Somerset to apply for a commercial licence, and the legacy lives on.

== Exhibits and events ==
The museum collects all materials pertaining to cider, from modern marketing materials to 17th century books. The stores are occasionally open to visitors on Heritage Open Days, and researchers can book time in the archive.

A tour of the Museum reveals the history of cider making and exhibits include a 300-year-old French Beam Press, a rare collection of English lead crystal cider glasses dating from 1730 and a collection of watercolours depicting the different types of apples and pears grown.

Visitors can walk through the original cider cellars and see how champagne-cider was produced and view a cooper's workshop, vat house and bottling line before sampling cider and related products in the gift shop.

The Museum organises an annual programme of events which includes talks, art exhibitions, and major events such as the International Cider and Perry Competition and the Cidermaking Festival. The Cider and Perry Competition has been running since the early 1980s and is well-respected in the cider-making community. In 2018 there were 210 entries.
