= List of electoral wards in Worcestershire =

This is a list of electoral divisions and wards in the ceremonial county of Worcestershire in the West Midlands. All changes since the re-organisation of local government following the passing of the Local Government Act 1972 are shown. The number of councillors elected for each electoral division or ward is shown in brackets.

== County council ==
=== Worcestershire ===
Electoral Divisions from 1 April 1998 (first election 1 May 1997) to 5 May 2005:

1. Alvechurch (1)
2. Barnt Green (1)
3. Batchley (1)
4. Bedwardine (1)
5. Bowbrook (1)
6. Bredon (1)
7. Brinton Park (1)
8. Broadway (1)
9. Bromsgrove North (1)
10. Bromsgrove South (1)
11. Bromsgrove West (1)
12. Chaddesley (1)
13. Church Hill (1)
14. Claines (1)
15. Cookley, Wolverley & Wribbenhall (1)
16. Crabbs Cross (1)
17. Croome (1)
18. Droitwich Rural (1)
19. Droitwich South (1)
20. Droitwich Town (1)
21. Evesham Hampton (1)
22. Evesham Town (1)
23. Habberley & Blakebrook (1)
24. Hagley & Furlongs (1)
25. Hallow (1)
26. Hoobrook (1)
27. Hurcott (1)
28. Inkberrow (1)
29. Lodge Park (1)
30. Malvern Chase (1)
31. Malvern Langland (1)
32. Malvern Link (1)
33. Malvern Trinity (1)
34. Matchborough (1)
35. Mitton (1)
36. Nunnery (1)
37. Pershore Town (1)
38. Powick (1)
39. Puxton (1)
40. Redditch Central (1)
41. Redditch West (1)
42. Rock & Bewdley (1)
43. Rubery (1)
44. Severn (1)
45. St Barnabas (1)
46. St Chad (1)
47. St Clement (1)
48. St John (1)
49. St Martin (1)
50. St Peter (1)
51. St Stephen (1)
52. Tenbury (1)
53. The Littletons (1)
54. Uffdown (1)
55. Winyates (1)
56. Woodvale (1)
57. Wythall (1)

Electoral Divisions from 5 May 2005 to 1 May 2025:

1. Alvechurch (1)
2. Arrow Valley East (2)
3. Arrow Valley West (2)
4. Beacon (1)
5. Bedwardine (1)
6. Bewdley (1)
7. Bowbrook (1)
8. Bredon (1)
9. Broadway (1)
10. Bromsgrove Central (1)
11. Bromsgrove East (1)
12. Bromsgrove South (1)
13. Bromsgrove West (1)
14. Chaddesley (1)
15. Claines (1)
16. Clent Hills (1)
17. Cookley, Wolverley & Wribbenhall (1)
18. Croome (1)
19. Droitwich East (1)
20. Droitwich West (1)
21. Evesham North West (1)
22. Evesham South (1)
23. Gorse Hill & Warndon (1)
24. Hallow (1)
25. Harvington (1)
26. Littletons (1)
27. Malvern Chase (1)
28. Malvern Langland (1)
29. Malvern Link (1)
30. Malvern Trinity (1)
31. Nunnery (1)
32. Ombersley (1)
33. Pershore (1)
34. Powick (1)
35. Rainbow Hill (1)
36. Redditch North (2)
37. Redditch South (2)
38. Riverside (1)
39. St Barnabas (1)
40. St Chads (1)
41. St Georges & St Oswald (1)
42. St John (1)
43. St Johns (1)
44. St Marys (1)
45. St Peter (1)
46. St Stephen (1)
47. Stourport-on-Severn (2)
48. Tenbury (1)
49. Upton Snodsbury (1)
50. Warndon Parish (1)
51. Woodvale (1)
52. Wythall (1)

Electoral Divisions from 1 May 2025 to present:

1. Alvechurch (1)
2. Beacon (1)
3. Bedwardine (1)
4. Bewdley (1)
5. Bowbrook (1)
6. Bredon (1)
7. Broadway (1)
8. Bromsgrove Central (1)
9. Bromsgrove East (1)
10. Bromsgrove South (1)
11. Bromsgrove West (1)
12. Chaddesley (1)
13. Claines (1)
14. Clent Hills (1)
15. Cookley, Wolverley & Wribbenhall (1)
16. Croome (1)
17. Droitwich East (1)
18. Droitwich West (1)
19. Evesham North West (1)
20. Evesham South (1)
21. Hallow (1)
22. Harvington (1)
23. Littletons (1)
24. Malvern Chase (1)
25. Malvern Langland (1)
26. Malvern Link (1)
27. Malvern Trinity (1)
28. Nunnery (1)
29. Ombersley (1)
30. Pershore (1)
31. Powick & Longdon (1)
32. Rainbow Hill & Fort Royal (1)
33. Redditch Central (2)
34. Redditch East (2)
35. Redditch South (2)
36. Redditch West (2)
37. Riverside (1)
38. St Barnabas (1)
39. St Chads (1)
40. St Georges (1)
41. St John (1)
42. St Johns (1)
43. St Peter (1)
44. St Peters (1)
45. St Stephen (1)
46. Stourport Areley Kings & Riverside (1)
47. Stourport Mitton (1)
48. Tenbury (1)
49. Upton Snodsbury (1)
50. Warndon & Elbury Park (1)
51. Warndon Villages (1)
52. Woodvale (1)
53. Wythall (1)

== District councils ==
=== Bromsgrove ===
Wards from 1 April 1974 (first election 7 June 1973) to 3 May 1979:

Wards from 3 May 1979 to 1 May 2003:

1. Uffdown (); ward abolished in 1995
2. Waseley (); ward abolished in 1995
3. Uffdown & Waseley (3); new ward added in 1995

Wards from 1 May 2003 to 7 May 2015:

1. Alvechurch (3)
2. Beacon (1)
3. Catshill (2)
4. Charford (2)
5. Drakes Cross & Walkers Heath (2)
6. Furlongs (2)
7. Hagley (2)
8. Hillside (2)
9. Hollywood & Majors Green (2)
10. Linthurst (1)
11. Marlbrook (2)
12. Norton (2)
13. St Johns (2)
14. Sidemoor (2)
15. Slideslow (2)
16. Stoke Heath (1)
17. Stoke Prior (1)
18. Tardebigge (1)
19. Uffdown (1)
20. Waseley (2)
21. Whitford (2)
22. Woodvale (1)
23. Wythall South (1)

Wards from 7 May 2015 to present:

1. Alvechurch South (1)
2. Alvechurch Village (1)
3. Aston Fields (1)
4. Avoncroft (1)
5. Barnt Green & Hopwood (1)
6. Belbroughton & Romsley (2)
7. Bromsgrove Central (1)
8. Catshill North (1)
9. Catshill South (1)
10. Charford (1)
11. Cofton (1)
12. Drakes Cross (1)
13. Hagley East (1)
14. Hagley West (1)
15. Hill Top (1)
16. Hollywood (1)
17. Lickey Hills (1)
18. Lowes Hill (1)
19. Marlbrook (1)
20. Norton (1)
21. Perryfields (1)
22. Rock Hill (1)
23. Rubery North (1)
24. Rubery South (1)
25. Sanders Park (1)
26. Sidemoor (1)
27. Slideslow (1)
28. Tardebigge (1)
29. Wythall East (1)
30. Wythall West (1)

=== Malvern Hills ===
Wards from 1 April 1974 (first election 7 June 1973) to 3 May 1979:

Wards from 3 May 1979 to 1 May 1997:

Wards from 1 May 1997 to 1 May 2003:

1. Baldwin (1)
2. Bayton & Mamble (1)
3. Broadheath (1)
4. Chase (3)
5. Hallow (1)
6. Kempsey (2)
7. Kyre Vale (1)
8. Langland (3)
9. Laugherne Hill (1)
10. Leigh & Bransford (1)
11. Lindridge (1)
12. Link (3)
13. Longdon (1)
14. Martley (1)
15. Morton (1)
16. Powyke (2)
17. Priory (2)
18. Ripple (1)
19. Temeside (1)
20. Tenbury Town (2)
21. The Hanleys (1)
22. Trinity (3)
23. Upton-upon-Severn (2)
24. Valley of the Teme (1)
25. Wells (2)
26. West (2)
27. Woodbury (1)

Wards from 1 May 2003 to 4 May 2023:

1. Alfrick & Leigh (2)
2. Baldwin (1)
3. Broadheath (2)
4. Chase (3)
5. Dyson Perrins (2)
6. Hallow (1)
7. Kempsey (2)
8. Lindridge (1)
9. Link (3)
10. Longdon (1)
11. Martley (1)
12. Morton (1)
13. Pickersleigh (3)
14. Powick (2)
15. Priory (2)
16. Ripple (1)
17. Teme Valley (1)
18. Tenbury (2)
19. Upton & Hanley (2)
20. Wells (2)
21. West (2)
22. Woodbury (1)

Wards from 4 May 2023 to present:

1. Alfrick, Leigh & Rushwick (2)
2. Baldwin (2)
3. Barnards Green (3)
4. Broadheath (1)
5. Castlemorton, Welland & Wells (2)
6. Great Malvern (2)
7. Hallow & Holt (1)
8. Kempsey (2)
9. Lindridge (1)
10. Link (3)
11. Longdon (1)
12. Martley (1)
13. Pickersleigh (1)
14. Powick & the Hanleys (2)
15. Tenbury (2)
16. Upper Howsell (1)
17. Upton & Ripple (2)
18. West (2)

=== Redditch ===
Wards from 1 April 1974 (first election 7 June 1973) to 5 May 1983:

1. Batchley (3)
2. Central (3)
3. Crabbs Cross (3)
4. East (2)
5. Feckenham (2)
6. Greenlands (7)
7. North (2)
8. West (3)

Wards from 5 May 1983 to 10 June 2004:

1. Abbey (2)
2. Batchley (3)
3. Central (3)
4. Church Hill (2)
5. Crabbs Cross (2)
6. Feckenham (2)
7. Greenlands (3)
8. Lodge Park (3)
9. Matchborough (3)
10. West (3)
11. Winyates (3)

Wards from 10 June 2004 to 2 May 2024:

1. Abbey (2)
2. Astwood Bank & Feckenham (2)
3. Batchley (3); renamed Batchley & Brockhill in 2008
4. Central (2)
5. Church Hill (3)
6. Crabbs Cross (2)
7. Greenlands (3)
8. Headless Cross & Oakenshaw (3)
9. Lodge Park (2)
10. Matchborough (2)
11. West (2)
12. Winyates (3)

Wards from 2 May 2024 to present:

1. Astwood Bank & Feckenham (3)
2. Batchley & Brockhill (3)
3. Central (3)
4. Greenlands & Lakeside (3)
5. Headless Cross & Oakenshaw (3)
6. Matchborough & Woodrow (3)
7. North (3)
8. Webheath & Callow Hill (3)
9. Winyates (3)

=== Worcester ===
Wards from 1 April 1974 (first election 7 June 1973) to 3 May 1979:

Wards from 3 May 1979 to 10 June 2004:

Wards from 10 June 2004 to 2 May 2024:

1. Arboretum (2)
2. Battenhall (2)
3. Bedwardine (3)
4. Cathedral (3)
5. Claines (3)
6. Gorse Hill (2)
7. Nunnery (3)
8. Rainbow Hill (2)
9. St Clement (2)
10. St John (3)
11. St Peter’s Parish (2)
12. St Stephen (2)
13. Warndon (2)
14. Warndon Parish North (2)
15. Warndon Parish South (2)

Wards from 2 May 2024 to present:

1. Arboretum (2)
2. Battenhall (2)
3. Cathedral (2)
4. Claines (3)
5. Dines Green & Grove Farm (2)
6. Fort Royal (2)
7. Leopard Hill (2)
8. Lower Wick & Pitmaston (2)
9. Nunnery (3)
10. Rainbow Hill (2)
11. St Clement (2)
12. St John’s (2)
13. St Nicholas (2)
14. St Peter’s Parish (2)
15. St Stephen (2)
16. Warndon & Elbury Park (3)

=== Wychavon ===
Wards from 1 April 1974 (first election 7 June 1973) to 3 May 1979:

Wards from 3 May 1979 to 1 May 2003:

1. Claines Central & West (); ward abolished in 1987
2. Claines East (); ward abolished in 1987
3. North Claines (2); new ward added in 1987

Wards from 1 May 2003 to 4 May 2023:

1. Badsey (1)
2. Bengeworth (2)
3. Bowbrook (1)
4. Bredon (1)
5. Bretforton & Offenham (1)
6. Broadway & Wickhamford (2)
7. Dodderhill (1)
8. Drakes Broughton (1)
9. Droitwich Central (1)
10. Droitwich East (2)
11. Droitwich South East (2)
12. Droitwich South West (2)
13. Droitwich West (2)
14. Eckington (1)
15. Elmley Castle & Somerville (1)
16. Evesham North (2)
17. Evesham South (2)
18. Fladbury (1)
19. Great Hampton (1)
20. Hartlebury (1)
21. Harvington & Norton (1)
22. Honeybourne & Pebworth (1)
23. Inkberrow (2)
24. Little Hampton (2)
25. Lovett & North Claines (2)
26. Norton & Whittington (1)
27. Ombersley (1)
28. Pershore (3)
29. Pinvin (1)
30. South Bredon Hill (1)
31. The Littletons (1)
32. Upton Snodsbury (1)

Wards from 4 May 2023 to present:

1. Badsey & Aldington (1)
2. Bengeworth (2)
3. Bowbrook (1)
4. Bredon (1)
5. Bredon Hill (1)
6. Bretforton & Offenham (1)
7. Broadway, Sedgeberrow & Childswickham (2)
8. Dodderhill (1)
9. Drakes Broughton, Norton & Whittington (2)
10. Droitwich East (2)
11. Droitwich South East (2)
12. Droitwich South West (2)
13. Droitwich West (2)
14. Eckington (1)
15. Evesham North (2)
16. Evesham South (2)
17. Fladbury (1)
18. Hampton (3)
19. Hartlebury (1)
20. Harvington & Norton (1)
21. Honeybourne, Pebworth & The Littletons (2)
22. Inkberrow (2)
23. North Claines & Salwarpe (2)
24. Ombersley (1)
25. Pershore (3)
26. Pinvin (1)
27. Upton Snodsbury (1)

=== Wyre Forest ===
Wards from 1 April 1974 (first election 7 June 1973) to 3 May 1979:

Wards from 3 May 1979 to 10 June 2004:

Wards from 10 June 2004 to 7 May 2015:

1. Aggborough & Spennells (3)
2. Areley Kings (3)
3. Bewdley & Arley (3)
4. Blakedown & Chaddesley (2)
5. Broadwaters (3)
6. Cookley (1)
7. Franche (3)
8. Greenhill (3)
9. Habberley & Blakebrook (3)
10. Lickhill (3)
11. Mitton (3)
12. Offmore & Comberton (3)
13. Oldington & Foley Park (2)
14. Rock (1)
15. Sutton Park (3)
16. Wolverley (1)
17. Wribbenhall (2)

Wards from 7 May 2015 to present:

1. Aggborough & Spennells (3)
2. Areley Kings & Riverside (3)
3. Bewdley & Rock (3)
4. Blakebrook & Habberley South (3)
5. Broadwaters (3)
6. Foley Park & Hoobrook (3)
7. Franche & Habberley North (3)
8. Lickhill (1)
9. Mitton (3)
10. Offmore & Comberton (3)
11. Wribbenhall & Arley (2)
12. Wyre Forest Rural (3)

== Former county council ==
=== Hereford and Worcester ===
Electoral Divisions from 1 April 1974 (first election 12 April 1973) to 2 May 1985:

1. Alvechurch & Cofton Hackett (1)
2. Belbroughton (1)
3. Bewdley No. 1 (1)
4. Bewdley No. 2 (1)
5. Bromsgrove East (1)
6. Bromsgrove North (1)
7. Bromsgrove North West (1)
8. Bromsgrove South (1)
9. Bromsgrove South East (1)
10. Bromsgrove West (1)
11. Bromyard (1)
12. Chaddesley Corbett (1)
13. Croome (1)
14. Dore & Bredwardine (1)
15. Droitwich North (1)
16. Droitwich Rural No. 1 (1)
17. Droitwich Rural No. 2 (1)
18. Droitwich Rural No. 3 (1)
19. Droitwich South (1)
20. Evesham East (1)
21. Evesham Rural No. 1 (1)
22. Evesham Rural No. 2 (1)
23. Evesham Rural No. 3 (1)
24. Evesham West (1)
25. Hagley (1)
26. Hereford No. 1 (Bartonsham) (1)
27. Hereford No. 2 (2)
28. Hereford No. 3 (Holmer) (1)
29. Hereford No. 4 (St Martins) (2)
30. Hereford No. 5 (North Tupsley) (1)
31. Hereford No. 6 (South Tupsley) (1)
32. Hereford Rural No. 1 (1)
33. Hereford Rural No. 2 (1)
34. Hereford Rural No. 3 (1)
35. Kidderminster Baxter (1)
36. Kidderminster Oldington (1)
37. Kidderminster Park (1)
38. Kidderminster Rowland Hill (1)
39. Kidderminster St Georges (1)
40. Kidderminster St Johns (2)
41. Kidderminster St Marys (1)
42. Kington (1)
43. Ledbury No. 1 (1)
44. Ledbury No. 2 (1)
45. Leominster & Wigmore No. 1 (1)
46. Leominster & Wigmore No. 2 (1)
47. Leominster (1)
48. Malvern East (1)
49. Malvern North (1)
50. Malvern South (1)
51. Malvern West (1)
52. Martley No. 1 (1)
53. Martley No. 2 (1)
54. Pershore No. 1 (1)
55. Pershore No. 2 (1)
56. Pershore No. 3 (1)
57. Powick (1)
58. Redditch No. 1 (1)
59. Redditch No. 2 (1)
60. Redditch No. 3 (1)
61. Redditch No. 4 (1)
62. Redditch No. 5 (1)
63. Redditch No. 6 (2)
64. Ross & Whitchurch No. 1 (1)
65. Ross & Whitchurch No. 2 (1)
66. Ross-on-Wye (1)
67. Stoke Prior (1)
68. Stourport No. 1 (1)
69. Stourport No. 2 (1)
70. Stourport No. 3 (1)
71. Tenbury (1)
72. Upton-on-Severn (1)
73. Weobley (1)
74. Wolverley & Cookley (1)
75. Worcester No. 1 (All Saints) (1)
76. Worcester No. 2 (Bedwardine) (1)
77. Worcester No. 3 (Claines) (1)
78. Worcester No. 4 (Holy Trinity) (1)
79. Worcester No. 5 (Nunnery) (1)
80. Worcester No. 6 (St Barnabas) (1)
81. Worcester No. 7 (St Clement) (1)
82. Worcester No. 8 (St John) (1)
83. Worcester No. 9 (St Martin) (1)
84. Worcester No. 10 (St Nicholas) (1)
85. Worcester No. 11 (St Peter) (1)
86. Worcester No. 12 (St Stephen) (1)
87. Wythall North (1)
88. Wythall South (1)

Electoral Divisions from 2 May 1985 to 1 April 1998 (county abolished):

1. Alvechurch (1)
2. Barnt Green (1)
3. Batchley (1)
4. Bedwardine (1)
5. Bowbrook (1)
6. Bredon (1)
7. Brinton Park (1)
8. Broadway (1)
9. Bromsgrove North (1)
10. Bromsgrove South (1)
11. Bromsgrove West (1)
12. Bromyard (1)
13. Central & St Nicholas (1)
14. Chaddesley (1)
15. Church Hill (1)
16. Claines (1)
17. College (1)
18. Cookley Wolverley & Wribbenhall (1)
19. Crabbs Cross (1)
20. Croome (1)
21. Dinmore (1)
22. Dore & Bredwardine (1)
23. Droitwich Rural (1)
24. Droitwich South (1)
25. Droitwich Town (1)
26. Evesham Hampton (1)
27. Evesham Town (1)
28. Habberley & Blakebrook (1)
29. Hagley & Furlongs (1)
30. Hallow (1)
31. Hinton & Hunderton (1)
32. Hoobrook (1)
33. Hope End (1)
34. Hurcott (1)
35. Inkberrow (1)
36. Kington & Wigmore (1)
37. Ledbury (1)
38. Leominster (1)
39. Leominster Rural (1)
40. Lodge Park (1)
41. Malvern Chase (1)
42. Malvern Langland (1)
43. Malvern Link (1)
44. Malvern Trinity (1)
45. Matchborough (1)
46. Mitton (1)
47. Nunnery (1)
48. Pershore Town (1)
49. Powick (1)
50. Puxton (1)
51. Redditch Central (1)
52. Redditch West (1)
53. Redhill & Newton Farm (1)
54. Rock & Bewdley (1)
55. Ross Rural (1)
56. Ross-on-Wye (1)
57. Rubery (1)
58. Severn (1)
59. St Barnabas (1)
60. St Chad (1)
61. St Clement (1)
62. St John (1)
63. St Martin (1)
64. St Peter (1)
65. St Stephen (1)
66. Tenbury (1)
67. The Littletons (1)
68. Thinghill (1)
69. Three Elms (1)
70. Tupsley (1)
71. Uffdown (1)
72. Weobley (1)
73. Winyates (1)
74. Woodvale (1)
75. Wormelow (1)
76. Wythall (1)

== Former district council ==
=== Leominster ===
See: List of electoral wards in Herefordshire#Leominster

== Electoral wards by constituency ==
Wards as they existed on 1 December 2020.

=== Bromsgrove ===
Bromsgrove: Alvechurch South; Alvechurch Village; Aston Fields; Avoncroft; Barnt Green & Hopwood; Belbroughton & Romsley; Bromsgrove Central; Catshill North; Catshill South; Charford; Cofton; Drakes Cross; Hagley East; Hagley West; Hill Top; Hollywood; Lickey Hills; Lowes Hill; Marlbrook; Norton; Perryfields; Rock Hill; Rubery North; Rubery South; Sanders Park; Sidemoor; Slideslow; Tardebigge; Wythall East; Wythall West.

=== Droitwich and Evesham ===
Wychavon: Badsey; Bengeworth; Bowbrook; Bretforton & Offenham; Broadway & Wickhamford; Drakes Broughton; Droitwich Central; Droitwich East; Droitwich South East; Droitwich South West; Droitwich West; Evesham North; Evesham South; Fladbury; Great Hampton; Hartlebury; Honeybourne & Pebworth; Little Hampton; Lovett & North Claines; Norton & Whittington; Ombersley; Pinvin; The Littletons; Upton Snodsbury.

=== Redditch ===
Redditch: Abbey; Astwood Bank & Feckenham; Batchley & Brockhill; Central; Church Hill; Crabbs Cross; Greenlands; Headless Cross & Oakenshaw; Lodge Park; Matchborough; West; Winyates.

Wychavon: Dodderhill; Harvington & Norton; Inkberrow.

=== West Worcestershire ===
Malvern Hills: Alfrick & Leigh; Baldwin; Broadheath; Chase; Dyson Perrins; Hallow; Kempsey; Lindridge; Link; Longdon; Martley; Morton; Pickersleigh; Powick; Priory; Ripple; Teme Valley; Tenbury; Upton & Hanley; Wells; West; Woodbury.

Wychavon: Bredon; Eckington; Elmley Castle & Somerville; Pershore; South Bredon Hill.

=== Worcester ===
Worcester: Arboretum; Battenhall; Bedwardine; Cathedral; Claines; Gorse Hill; Nunnery; Rainbow Hill; St Clement; St John; St Peter’s Parish; St Stephen; Warndon; Warndon Parish North; Warndon Parish South.

=== Wyre Forest ===
Wyre Forest: Aggborough & Spennells; Areley Kings & Riverside; Bewdley & Rock; Blakebrook & Habberley South; Broadwaters; Foley Park & Hoobrook; Franche & Habberley North; Lickhill; Mitton; Offmore & Comberton; Wribbenhall & Arley; Wyre Forest Rural.

== See also ==
- List of parliamentary constituencies in Herefordshire and Worcestershire
