= Hereford =

Cathedral city and the county town of Herefordshire, England

Coordinates: 52.056°N 2.716°W

- City and civil parish
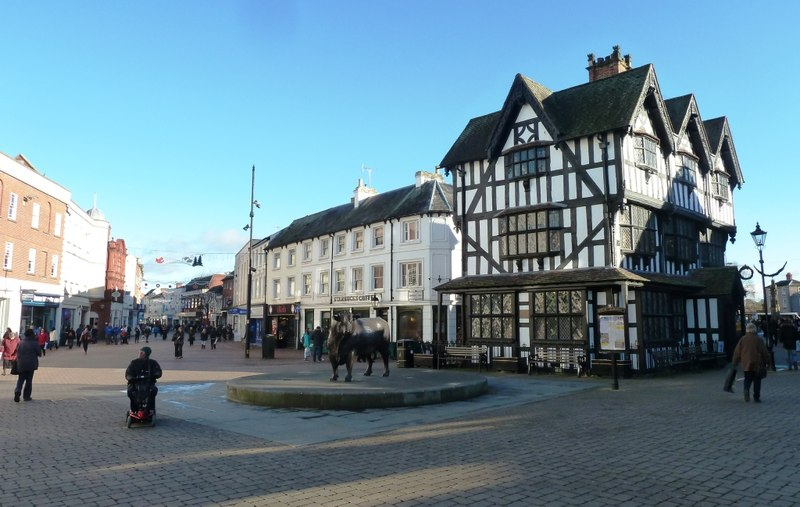
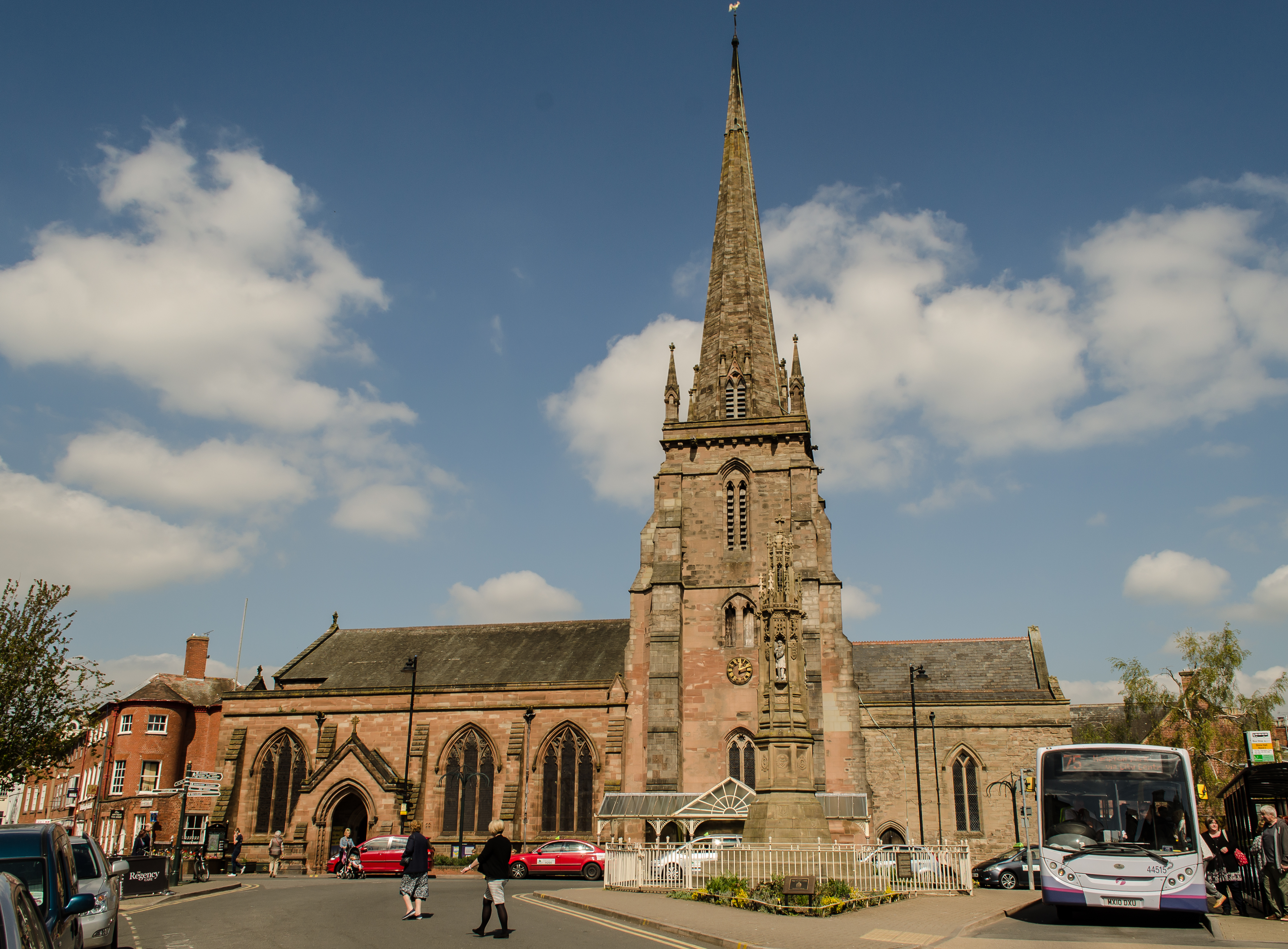
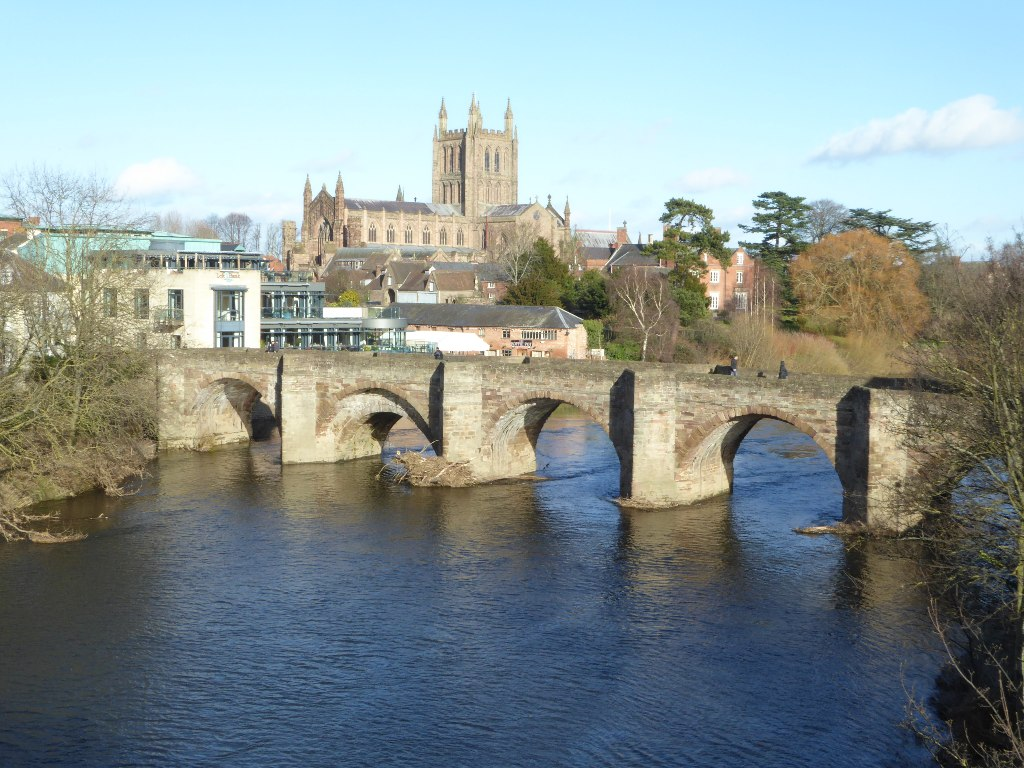
- Clockwise from the top: Hereford City Centre, St Peter's Church, River Wye Bridge and the Cathedral

- Coat of arms of the City Council

- Location within Herefordshire
- Interactive map of Hereford
- Area: 7.85 sq mi (20.3 km^{2})
- Population: 53,112 (2021 Census)
  - Density: 6,766/sq mi (2,612/km^{2})
- OS grid reference: SO515405
  - London: 135.7 miles (218.4 km) ESE
- Civil parish: Hereford
- Unitary authority: Herefordshire
- Ceremonial county: Herefordshire
- Region: West Midlands
- Country: England
- Sovereign state: United Kingdom
- Areas of the city: List: Aylestone Hill; Bartonsham; Belmont Rural (Village); Bobblestock; Broomy Hill; Central; College; Eign Hill; Greyfriars; Hinton & Hunderton; Huntington (Hamlet); Kings Acre; Lower Bullingham (Village); Newton Farm; Racecourse; Redhill; Saxon Gate; The Hamptons; Tupsley; Victoria Park; Whitecross; Widemarsh
- Post town: HEREFORD
- Postcode district: HR1, HR2, HR4
- Dialling code: 01432
- Police: West Mercia
- Fire: Hereford and Worcester
- Ambulance: West Midlands
- UK Parliament: Hereford and South Herefordshire
- Website: herefordcitycouncil.gov.uk

Hereford (/ˈhɛrɪfərd/ HERR-if-ərd) is a cathedral city and the county town of the ceremonial county of Herefordshire, England. It is on the banks of the River Wye and lies 16 miles (26 km) east of the border with Wales, 23 miles (37 km) north-west of Gloucester and 24 miles (39 km) south-west of Worcester. With a population of 61,900 in 2024, it is the largest settlement in Herefordshire.

An early town charter from 1189, granted by Richard I of England, describes it as "Hereford in Wales". Hereford has been recognised as a city since time immemorial, with the status being reconfirmed in October 2000. Hereford has been a civil parish since 2000.

Products from Hereford include cider, beer, leather goods, nickel alloys, poultry, chemicals and sausage rolls, as well as the Hereford breed of cattle.

== Toponymy ==
The Herefordshire edition of Cambridge County Geographies states "a Welsh derivation of Hereford is more probable than a Saxon one", but the name "Hereford" is also said to come from the Anglo-Saxon "here", an army or formation of soldiers, and the "ford", a place for crossing a river (cf. Herford, Westphalia, with the same Saxon etymology). If this is the origin it suggests that Hereford was a place where a body of armed men forded or crossed the Wye. The Welsh name for Hereford is Henffordd, meaning "old road", and probably refers to the Roman road and Roman settlement at nearby Stretton Sugwas.

== History ==
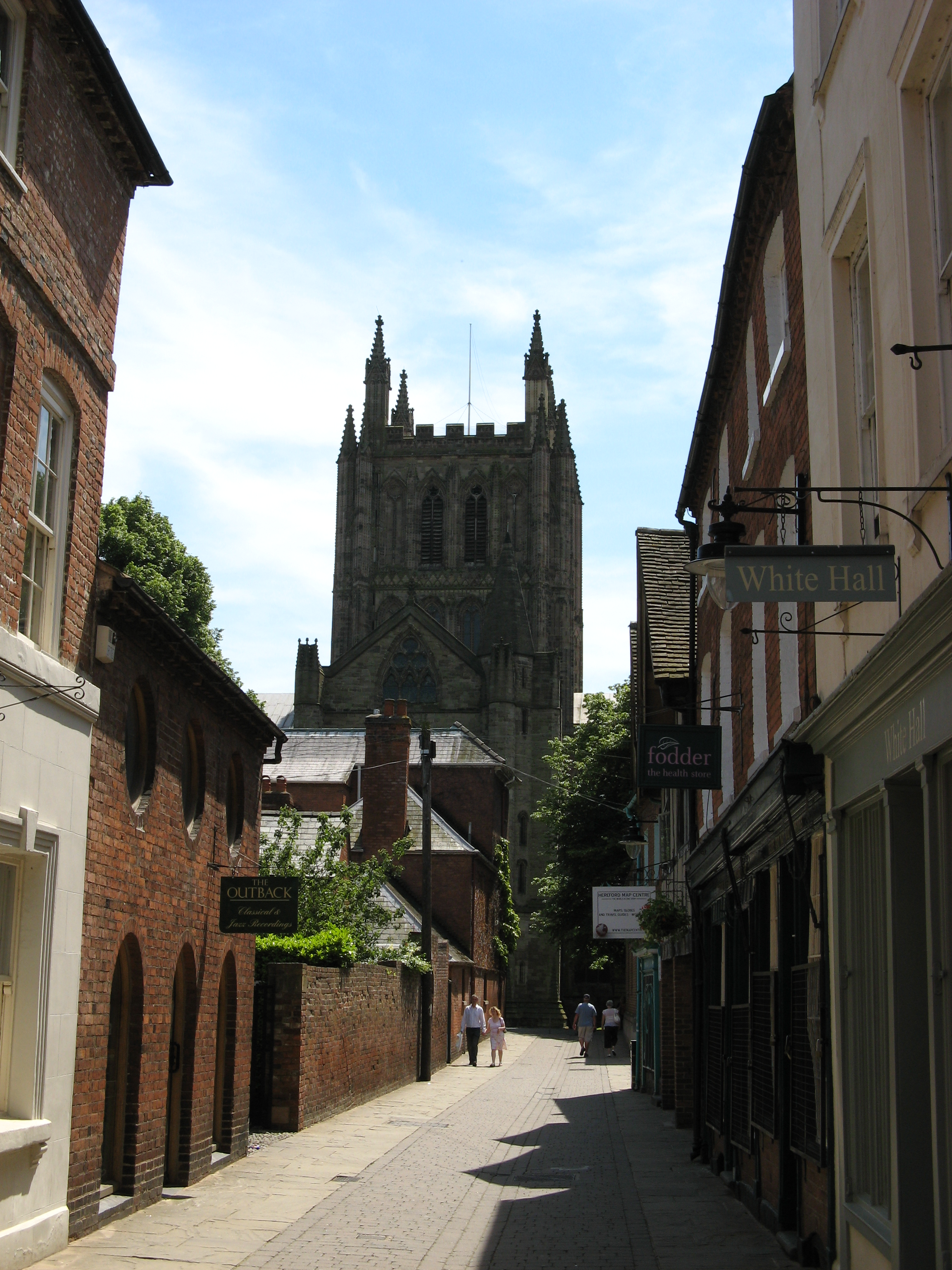
Hereford Cathedral, from Church Street

Hereford became the seat of Putta, Bishop of Hereford, some time between 676 and 688 AD, after which the settlement continued to grow due to its proximity to the border between Mercia and Wales, becoming the Saxon capital of West Mercia by the beginning of the 8th century.

Hostilities between the Anglo-Saxons and the Welsh came to a head with the Battle of Hereford in 760, in which the Britons freed themselves from the influence of the English. Hereford was again targeted by the Welsh during their conflict with the Anglo-Saxon King Edward the Confessor in 1056 when, supported by Viking allies, Gruffydd ap Llywelyn, King of Gwynedd and Powys, marched on the town and put it to the torch before returning home in triumph. Hereford had the only mint west of the Severn in the reign of Athelstan (924–939), and it was to Hereford, then a border town, that Athelstan summoned the leading Welsh princes.

The present Hereford Cathedral dates from the early 12th century, as does the first bridge across the Wye. Former Bishops of Hereford include Saint Thomas de Cantilupe and Lord High Treasurer of England Thomas Charlton.

Hereford was home to a small but relatively important Jewish community until 1290, when Jews were expelled from England by Edward I. Jews from Worcester and Gloucester moved to Hereford after their expulsion in January 1275 by the Queen mother, Eleanor of Provence. The Bishops of Hereford campaigned against the presence of the community, including Cantilupe, and Richard Swinefield, who tried to stop social contact between Christians and Jews.

The city gave its name (translated to French) to two suburbs of Paris: Maisons-Alfort (population 54,600) and Alfortville (population 36,232), due to a manor built there by Peter of Aigueblanche, Bishop of Hereford, in the middle of the 13th century.

A base for successive holders of the title Earl of Hereford, the city was once the site of Hereford Castle, which rivalled that of Windsor in size and scale. This was a base for repelling Welsh attacks and a secure stronghold for English kings, such as King Henry IV when on campaign in the Welsh Marches against Owain Glyndŵr. The castle was dismantled in the 18th century and landscaped into Castle Green.

After the Battle of Mortimer's Cross in 1461, during the Wars of the Roses, the defeated Lancastrian leader Owen Tudor (grandfather of the future Henry VII of England) was taken to Hereford by Sir Roger Vaughan and executed in High Town. A plaque now marks the spot of the execution. Vaughan was later himself executed, under a flag of truce, by Owen's son Jasper.

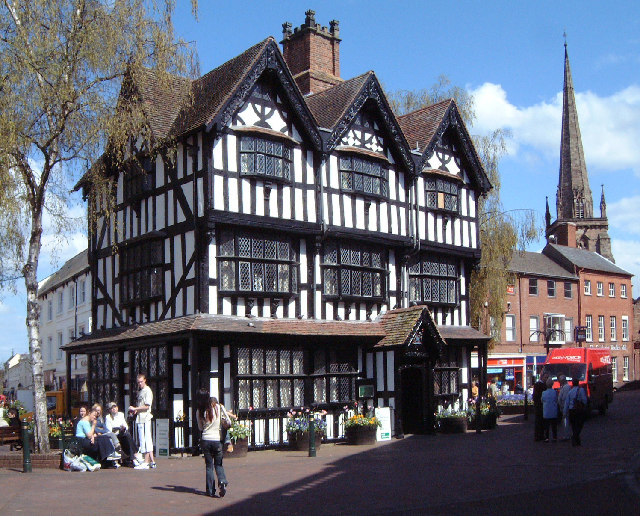
The Old House, High Town. This timber-framed Jacobean building, built in 1621, is now a museum

During the English Civil War, the city changed hands several times. On 30 September 1642, Parliamentarians led by Sir Robert Harley and Henry Grey, 1st Earl of Stamford occupied the city without opposition. In December they withdrew to Gloucester because of the presence in the area of a Royalist army under Lord Herbert. The city was again occupied briefly from 23 April to 18 May 1643 by Parliamentarians commanded by Sir William Waller, but it was in 1645 that the city saw most action. On 31 July 1645, a Scottish army of 14,000 under Alexander Leslie, 1st Earl of Leven besieged the city but met stiff resistance from its garrison and inhabitants. They withdrew on 1 September when they received news that a force led by King Charles was approaching. The city was finally taken for Parliament on 18 December 1645 by Colonel Birch and Colonel Morgan. King Charles showed his gratitude to the city of Hereford on 16 September 1645 by augmenting the city's coat of arms with the three lions of Richard I of England, ten Scottish Saltires signifying the ten defeated Scottish regiments, a very rare lion crest on top of the coat of arms signifying "defender of the faith" and the even rarer gold-barred peer's helm, found only on the arms of one other municipal authority: those of the City of London.

Nell Gwynne, actress and mistress of King Charles II, is said to have been born in Hereford in 1650 (although other towns and cities, notably Oxford, claim her as their own); Gwynn Street is named after her. Another famous actor born in Hereford is David Garrick (1717–1779).

The Bishop's Palace next to the cathedral was built in 1204 and is still in use today. Hereford Cathedral School is one of the oldest schools in England. The Harold Street Barracks were completed in 1856.

During World War I in 1916, a fire at the Garrick Theatre killed eight young girls who had been performing at a charity concert.

== Governance ==
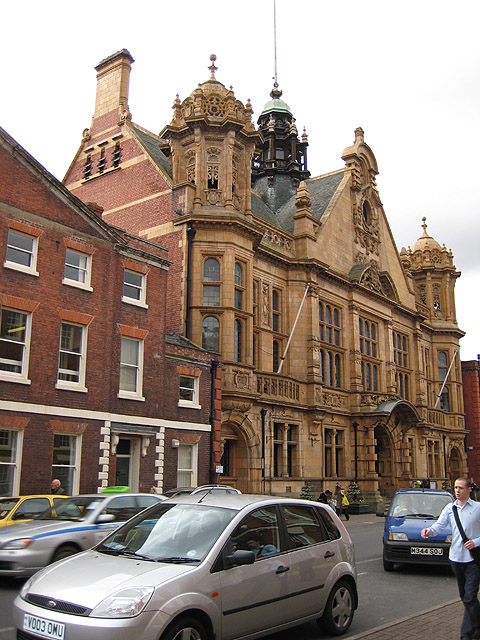
Hereford Town Hall, opened in 1904

The main local government body covering Hereford is Herefordshire Council. Hereford has a city council, a parish council with city status, and has only limited powers.

Historically, Hereford has been the county town of Herefordshire. In 1974, Herefordshire was merged with Worcestershire to become part of the county of Hereford and Worcester and Hereford became a district of the new county. It was originally intended for there to be 1 single district for Herefordshire, it was later decided to split it into 3. No successor parish was formed, so the former borough became unparished. Hereford had formed a historic borough and was reformed by the Municipal Corporations Act 1835. On 1 April 1998, the county of Hereford and Worcester was abolished; Herefordshire and Worcestershire were re-established as separate counties.

the former district in Hereford and Worcester

However, the new Herefordshire was a unitary authority without any districts and so Hereford lost its district status (although, confusingly, the authority's full legal name is the County of Herefordshire District Council). Charter trustees were appointed to preserve mayoral traditions until a civil parish council could be set up, which happened on 1 April 2000 when the unparished area was parished as Hereford and Belmont Rural, part also went to the existing parish of Clehonger. Hereford is one of only eight civil parishes in England which have city status. It is based at Hereford Town Hall.

Hereford was the name of a parliamentary constituency that was centred in the city from 1295 to 2010, when it was renamed Hereford and South Herefordshire. The current Member of Parliament (MP) in the House of Commons is Jesse Norman of the Conservative Party. He has represented the constituency since May 2010.

== Geography ==
=== Climate ===
As with all of the UK, Hereford experiences a maritime climate, with limited seasonal temperature ranges, and generally moderate rainfall throughout the year. The nearest Met Office weather station, for which 30-year averages are available, is Credenhill weather station, about 4 miles (6 km) north west of the city centre. Before 2001, the weather station at Preston Wynne (7 miles, 11 km to the north-east) provided the data.

Since 2001, extremes at Hereford Credenhill have ranged from 33.6 °C (92.5 °F) during July 2006, to as low as −15.8 °C (3.6 °F) during December 2010.

In February 2020, many houses in Hereford were evacuated due to floods.

On 17 February 2020, the River Wye rose to 6.11 metres, the highest ever recorded, as a result of the weather pattern created by Storm Dennis.

Climate data for Hereford, elevation: 75 m (246 ft), (1991–2020 normals, extremes 1970–1979)
Month	Jan	Feb	Mar	Apr	May	Jun	Jul	Aug	Sep	Oct	Nov	Dec	Year
Record high °C (°F)	13.5 (56.3)	15.1 (59.2)	17.7 (63.9)	22.7 (72.9)	26.6 (79.9)	32.6 (90.7)	33.8 (92.8)	32.8 (91.0)	27.0 (80.6)	22.8 (73.0)	19.5 (67.1)	15.4 (59.7)	33.8 (92.8)
Mean daily maximum °C (°F)	7.8 (46.0)	8.5 (47.3)	10.9 (51.6)	13.7 (56.7)	17.0 (62.6)	19.9 (67.8)	21.9 (71.4)	21.4 (70.5)	18.8 (65.8)	14.6 (58.3)	10.8 (51.4)	8.1 (46.6)	14.5 (58.0)
Daily mean °C (°F)	4.7 (40.5)	5.0 (41.0)	6.8 (44.2)	9.0 (48.2)	12.1 (53.8)	15.0 (59.0)	16.9 (62.4)	16.5 (61.7)	14.0 (57.2)	10.8 (51.4)	7.3 (45.1)	4.9 (40.8)	10.3 (50.4)
Mean daily minimum °C (°F)	1.5 (34.7)	1.5 (34.7)	2.7 (36.9)	4.2 (39.6)	7.1 (44.8)	10.0 (50.0)	11.8 (53.2)	11.6 (52.9)	9.2 (48.6)	6.9 (44.4)	3.8 (38.8)	1.6 (34.9)	6.0 (42.8)
Record low °C (°F)	−10.7 (12.7)	−8.9 (16.0)	−6.7 (19.9)	−5.0 (23.0)	−1.4 (29.5)	1.0 (33.8)	4.6 (40.3)	3.3 (37.9)	−0.4 (31.3)	−2.2 (28.0)	−6.7 (19.9)	−7.2 (19.0)	−10.7 (12.7)
Average precipitation mm (inches)	67.3 (2.65)	51.2 (2.02)	48.8 (1.92)	50.2 (1.98)	53.4 (2.10)	47.8 (1.88)	48.5 (1.91)	58.4 (2.30)	50.6 (1.99)	77.9 (3.07)	65.7 (2.59)	72.7 (2.86)	695.5 (27.38)
Average precipitation days (≥ 1.0 mm)	12.0	10.1	9.4	9.8	9.6	8.6	8.5	9.1	9.0	11.9	12.8	12.5	123.3
Source 1: Met Office
Source 2: Starlings Roost Weather

== Demography ==
In 2021 the built-up area had a population of 60,475, the urban area had a population of 61,014, the agglomeration had a population of 63,346 and the parish had a population of 53,112.

The following statistics were recorded for the parish of Hereford at the 2021 Census:

Hereford: Ethnicity: 2021 Census
Ethnic group	Population	%
White	50,427	95%
Asian or Asian British	1,167	2.2%
Mixed	718	1.4%
Black or Black British	319	0.6%
Arab	127	0.2%
Other Ethnic Group	350	0.7%
Total	53,112	100%

The religious composition of Hereford at the 2021 Census was recorded as:

Hereford: Religion: 2021 Census
Religious	Population	%
Christian	28,092	57%
Irreligious	20,029	40.7%
Muslim	426	0.9%
Hindu	196	0.4%
Buddhist	173	0.4%
Other religion	345	0.6%
Total	53,112	100%

== Transport ==
=== Roads ===
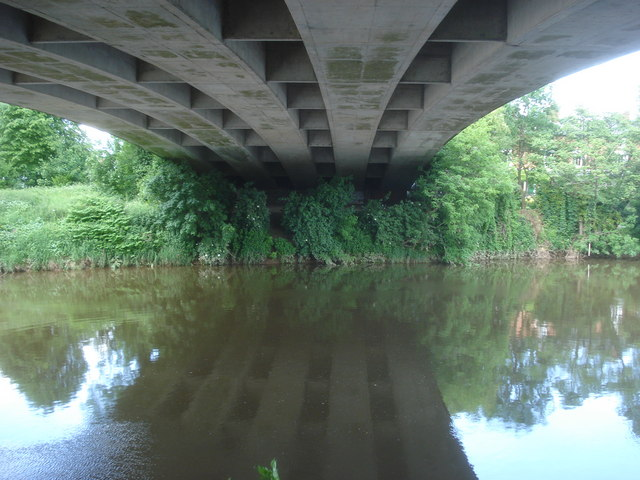
Underneath Greyfriars Bridge

Hereford, as an ancient crossing over the River Wye, has long been important within the regional and national transport network. Today, the city is served by several major routes, including the A49, A438, A465 and A4103. The nearest motorway is the M50 , which passes to the south of Ledbury.

Along the northern rim of the city, the A4103 is named Roman Road, running in a straight line from east to west. Only one major route crosses the River Wye: the A49/Victoria Street, which is carried by Greyfriars Bridge.

The Hereford Link Road was completed in December 2017, costing around £34,000,000 to build.

In 2017, Hereford was named Britain's second slowest city, with an average traffic speed of 14.09 mph. Cambridge topped the list, whilst London came third with vehicles travelling at an average 14.59 mph.

==== Future ====
Following completion of the Hereford Link Road in December 2017, there are plans to add new homes, a university building and a transport hub to this area.

Plans for a north–south bypass were scrapped in February 2021.

=== Railways ===
Hereford railway station lies to the north of the city centre. It is a junction of two lines: the western terminus of the Cotswold Line and a through station on the Welsh Marches Line between Abergavenny and Leominster.

Services are provided by three train operating companies:

- Transport for Wales operates services between Swansea, Cardiff Central, Newport and Shrewsbury; services continue either to Chester and Holyhead or to Crewe and Manchester Piccadilly.
- Great Western Railway runs regular services to London Paddington, via Worcester Shrub Hill, Oxford and Reading.
- West Midlands Railway operates services to Birmingham New Street, via Great Malvern, Worcester Foregate Street and Bromsgrove.

A second station, Hereford Barton, served the city between 1854 and 1893.

=== Buses ===
Since the decision of First Midland Red to pull out of the city in 2015, the majority of local bus routes have been operated by Hereford bus and coach operator Yeomans Travel. Longer routes include:

- 23, which runs to Abergavenny and Newport, run by Stagecoach South Wales
- 33 to Gloucester is operated by Stagecoach West
- 66 to Monmouth is run by Newport Bus
- T14 links Hereford station to Hay-on-Wye and Brecon, operated by TrawsCymru.

In 2023, Hereford City Council introduced a free, electric, inter-city bus service. As of 2025 the service is set to be axed by Hereford City Council, owing to the rising costs of the service.

=== Cycling ===
Cycling infrastructure in Hereford is maintained by Herefordshire Council and Sustrans.

An unbroken shared-use path for cyclists and pedestrians runs along the western rim of the city, from Newton Farm to Holmer. The Great Western Way route crosses the River Wye using Hunderton Bridge and follows the route of a disused railway line.

National Cycle Route 46 runs southbound from Hereford to Swansea. The route is signposted and unbroken; the next destination from Hereford en route is Kilpeck Castle. The route passes through Abergavenny and the Heads of the Valleys as it enters Wales. As of summer 2020, Sustrans proposes an extension to Route 46 running eastbound from Hereford to Worcester.

National Cycle Route 44 leaves Hereford to the southeast and runs as far as Rotherwas. The route is incomplete; once completed, Route 44 will run to Ludlow Castle to the north and Cinderford, Forest of Dean to the south. The nearest bike park is the Black Mountain Bike Park.

== Military associations ==
In 1999, the British Army Special Air Service (SAS) moved from their base at Stirling Lines (formerly Bradbury Lines) in Hereford, their home since 1960, to a former Royal Air Force base RAF Credenhill in Credenhill that had been redeveloped and was designated as Stirling Lines in 2000. The clock tower on which the names of deceased SAS soldiers are inscribed was relocated.

The Anglican church of St Martin has part of its graveyard set aside as an SAS memorial, over twenty SAS soldiers are buried there. There is also a Wall of Remembrance displaying memorial plaques to some who could not be buried, including the 18 SAS men who lost their lives in the Sea King helicopter crash during the Falklands Campaign on 19 May 1982, and a sculpture and stained glass window dedicated to the SAS.

On 17 October 2017, Ascension, a new sculpture and window honouring the Special Air Service Regiment in Hereford Cathedral, was dedicated by the then Bishop of Hereford.

== Economy ==
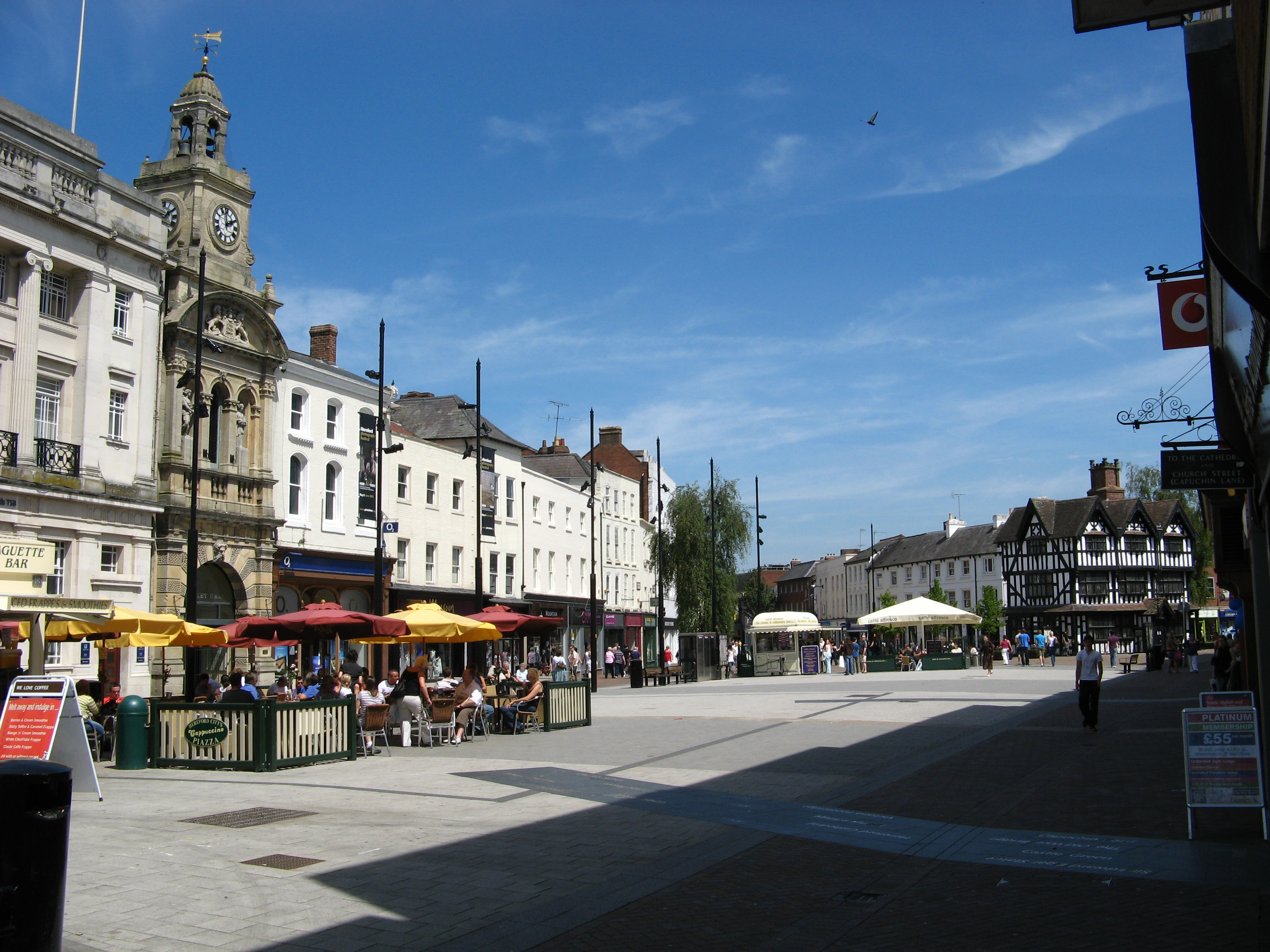
The High Town pedestrianised shopping area

In 2005, Hereford was granted Fairtrade City status.

Major employers in the city include:

- Bulmers, now owned by Heineken – Cider and alcoholic beverages producer. Brands include Woodpecker Cider, Strongbow and Bulmers Cider
- Special Metals Wiggin Ltd – Manufacturers of nickel alloys
- Avara Foods (formerly Cargill and Sun Valley) – Manufacturers and suppliers of food products for retailers and foodservice operators
- Painter Brothers – Manufacturers of galvanized steel towers including the Skylon at the Festival of Britain

Herefordshire is a centre for cider production as it contains many acres of orchards; many breweries and associated organisations exist here, along with other heavy and light industries.

== Regeneration ==
Many of the schools in Hereford have been rebuilt and improved. The Herefordshire and Ludlow College has also been rebuilt to a 21st-century standard. In September 2021 a new higher education institution NMITE (New Model Institute for Technology and Engineering) welcomed its first students who are undertaking an MEng Integrated Engineering.

Hereford benefitted from the PFI reconstruction schemes for NHS hospitals, with the former County Hospital site having £60 million spent on a brand new, one-site hospital to replace the former three hospitals: the General, the Eye Hospital, and the County Hospital. The new Hereford County Hospital was the single largest investment in Herefordshire at that point. In 2015, further funds for more improvements at the hospital were granted.

=== Current and future projects ===
A major regeneration project is taking place in Hereford city centre, formerly known as the Edgar Street Grid. This covers an area of around 100 acres (0.40 km^{2}) just north of the old city walls. Work started on 8 October 2012, and should take around 15 years to complete the whole project. The regeneration includes the rebuilding of the canal basin at the end of the currently disused Herefordshire and Gloucestershire Canal. The £80 million phase 1 includes a supermarket, department store, multiplex cinema, shops, restaurants, and other facilities and opened in late Spring 2014.

A proposed bypass has been drawn up to circle the city, which suffers from rush-hour traffic, with potential routes either to the east or west of the city. Both routes would connect with the recently completed Rotherwas Access Road, connecting the Rotherwas Industrial Estate to the A49. Rotherwas itself has recently been awarded Enterprise Zone status by the government; this is expected to boost the economy and bring in thousands of new jobs.

A second railway station for Hereford has been discussed, which would be situated in Rotherwas as part of the Enterprise Zone.

Hereford is due to receive half of the 20,600 new homes expected to be built in the county by 2026, as part of the Regional Spatial Strategy.

== Sport ==
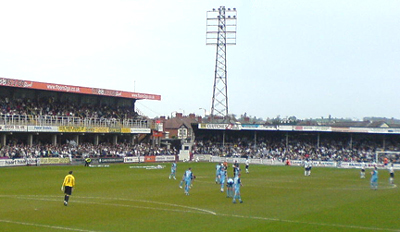
Hereford United's Edgar Street ground

Hereford is the home of the football club Hereford FC, who play at Edgar Street in the National League North. They are a phoenix club that was set up in the wake of the demise of Hereford United Football Club in 2014. United were best known for beating Newcastle 2–1 in an FA Cup replay in January 1972, when they were still a non-league side and Newcastle were in the top division of English football.

Hereford also hosts three Non-League clubs. Westfields F.C. and Hereford Pegasus F.C. both play in the Hellenic Football League, while Hereford Lads Club F.C. plays in the Herefordshire Football League after voluntarily withdrawing from the Hellenic League in the 2023–24 season.

Hereford Rugby Club announced plans in 2012 for a £6 million move to a new home. Also based at the Rugby club are Hereford Stampede, who are an American football team who play in the BAFA National Leagues and made their full League debut in 2021.

Hereford Hockey Club is based at the Hereford City Sports Club, with teams entered into leagues in the West Hockey Association.

The city is home to Hereford Racecourse, a traditional National Hunt course to the north of the city centre which hosted around twenty meetings a year. The company who leased the site decided in 2012 that the site was not viable. What many thought to be the last meeting was held on 16 December 2012, however the course reopened for racing in October 2016.

=== Public leisure ===
Hereford's public leisure facilities are managed by the not-for-profit trust HALO Leisure, which runs the Hereford Leisure Centre (which includes sports halls, gymnasium, squash courts, golf course and an outdoor athletics facility), and the Hereford Leisure Pool (which includes a gymnasium, full size swimming pool, leisure pool, diving pool, and learners' pool).

=== Clubs and societies ===
The Hereford Rowing Club (along with the Kayak Club) uses the River Wye. The stretch of river is also used for other water sports. Hereford has a nine pin skittle league, formed on 24 October 1902, and today consists of five divisions.

== Education ==
=== University ===
A new higher education institution, the New Model Institute for Technology and Engineering (NMITE), has been created in Hereford, which had its first intake of students in September 2021. It is envisioned as a seed institution for a future University of Hereford within a decade.

=== Colleges ===
Hereford is home to five colleges, including:

- Hereford College of Arts – a publicly funded art school on Folly Lane, with a Higher Education centre on College Road in the former main buildings of the Royal National College for the Blind. The University of Wales Trinity St Davids co-operate to provide degree qualifications.
- Herefordshire and Ludlow College (HLC), formerly known as Hereford College of Technology – The Folly Lane facility includes a university centre for the University of Worcester.
- The National School of Blacksmithing is the oldest established blacksmithing college in the UK, also the largest facility for training smiths in Europe. This is also part of HLC.
- Hereford Sixth Form College
- The Royal National College for the Blind – one of multiple institutions catering to the blind in Britain. The college occupies the former Hereford College of Education campus.
- Holme Lacy College – an agricultural college that was part of the Pershore Group of Colleges (now Warwickshire College), but currently belongs to Herefordshire and Ludlow College (HLC).

=== Schools ===
Hereford's many secondary schools include:

- The Steiner Academy Hereford – The first Rudolf Steiner school in England to become an academy.
- Aylestone Business and Enterprise College – A co-educational comprehensive school for pupils aged between 11 and 16, created in 1976 by merging two former grammar schools, the Hereford High School for Boys and the Hereford High School for Girls. Specialises in Business and Enterprise.
- The Bishop of Hereford's Bluecoat School – A co-educational voluntary aided comprehensive school for pupils aged between 11 and 16, formed in 1973 from two former church secondary schools, the Bluecoat Foundation, dating back to 1710, and the Bishop's School, a secondary modern school founded in 1958. It is now a technology college with a second specialism in languages.
- The Hereford Academy – A high school for pupils aged between 11 and 19. It was known as Haywood High School in the late seventies until 2006, when it was renamed as Wyebridge Sports College. As of 1 September 2009 it was renamed The 'Hereford Academy'. It has been, like Whitecross High School, re-classified as a 'Sports College'. The academy's new building opened in September 2011, and the demolition of the old school site, making way for new playing fields to be laid out, was completed in Spring 2012.
- Hereford Cathedral School – A co-educational independent school and sixth form, and a member of the Headmasters' and Headmistresses' Conference. The earliest existing records date from 1384 though it is likely that a school was associated with the cathedral from its foundation in the late 7th century. HCS, together with HCJS (see below), educates the choristers for Hereford Cathedral Choir.
- St Mary's RC High School – A Roman Catholic comprehensive school for boys and girls aged 11–16. The school primarily serves the Catholic communities of Herefordshire and is in a rural location close to the River Lugg, a few miles to the east of the City of Hereford in the village of Lugwardine.
- Whitecross Hereford High School – A specialist sports college, which moved to a brand new PFI building in June 2006. The college for pupils aged between 11 and 16 aims to use the new facility to provide the best high school education for its pupils in the topic of Sports & Fitness.

Primary schools in the city include Hereford Cathedral Junior School, a co-educational independent school. Hereford Cathedral Junior School is, with Hereford Cathedral School, part of the ancient Hereford Cathedral Foundation dating back to 676. The Junior School was founded as an independent school in 1898. The city's other primary schools are: Lord Scudamore Academy, St James C of E, St Francis Xavier R.C, Trinity, Holmer C of E, Marlbrook, Riverside, St Martin's, Broadlands, Riverside, Hampton Dene and St Paul's C of E.

== Health and social care ==
In early 2008, Herefordshire Council and NHS Herefordshire became the first local authority and primary care trust to form a new kind of partnership.

The major hospital in Hereford is the Hereford County Hospital. Ambulance services are provided by the West Midlands Ambulance Service NHS Trust. The Midlands Air Ambulance charity provides air ambulance services across Herefordshire.

A private national firm operates a hospital in Hereford.

== Society and culture ==
=== Agriculture ===
Farming has played a major part in the history of the county of Herefordshire. For many years, the City of Hereford was the epicentre, playing host to the Cattle Market, a major market site.

With the 2001 foot-and-mouth outbreak, the market suffered with reduced trade. Established by Act of Parliament, the market had to be provided and so a Bill was introduced in 2003 to move the site to the outskirts of the city. The inner-city site would then be available for redevelopment, a process that has now finished.

The new Hereford Cattle Market opened its doors in August 2011 on the site just outside the city; it has already proved so successful that trading and business is up on the previous site's record.

=== Music ===
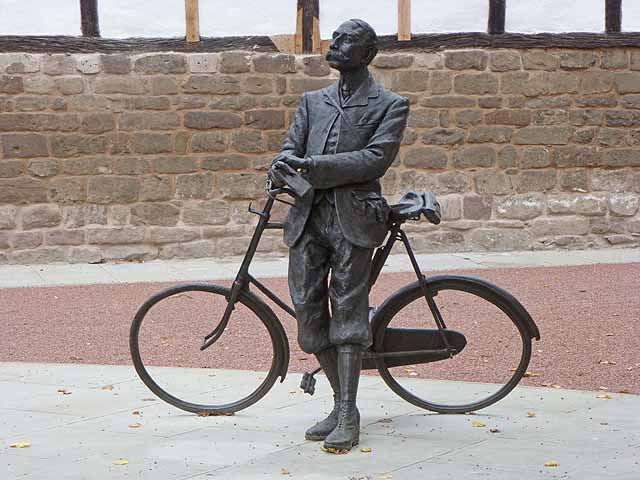
Statue of Sir Edward Elgar on the Cathedral Close

The annual Three Choirs Festival, originating in the 18th century and one of the oldest music festivals in the British Isles, is held in Hereford every third year; the other venues are Gloucester and Worcester.

The hymn "Hereford" was written by Samuel Sebastian Wesley (1810–1876). He was an organist at Hereford Cathedral (1832–1835). This tune is often sung to the words 'O Thou who camest from above'.

Composer Sir Edward Elgar lived at Plas Gwyn, Eign Hill, in Hereford between 1904 and 1911, writing some of his most famous works during that time. He is commemorated with a statue on the Cathedral Close. One of his Enigma Variations was inspired by a bulldog named Dan falling into the River Wye at Hereford, and the dog is similarly honoured with a stone statue beside the river. Not long after moving into the city Elgar, despite not being a city council member, was offered but declined the office of mayor of the city. He visited the city as a conductor at the Three Choirs Festival, the last occasion in 1933 prior to his death.

Hereford is home to the Hereford Police Male Voice Choir who competed on the BBC TV show "Last Choir Standing", and the Railway Choir.

A charity music school is based in Hereford.

=== Art ===
H.Art, or Herefordshire Art Week, is an annual county-wide exhibition held in September, displaying the work of local artists. Many places usually closed to the public are opened during this week, such as the Bishop's Palace at the cathedral.

Polish-born sculptor Walenty Pytel has had studios in Hereford since 1963 after training at Hereford College of Art.

There is a statue of a bronze Hereford bull designed by Brian Alabaster ARBS in front of The Old House.

=== Literature ===
The troops of the fictional commando squad Rainbow were based at RAF Hereford, as detailed in the novel Rainbow Six.

The action of the fictional novels Shades of Grey and The Last Dragonslayer by Jasper Fforde takes place in Hereford.

Phil Rickman's Merrily Watkins series of supernatural and mystery novels is set in and around Hereford.

=== Media ===
The local radio stations include Hits Radio Herefordshire & Worcestershire (formerly known as Wyvern), which broadcasts on 97.6 MHz, 96.7 MHz and 102.8 MHz FM, Sunshine Radio on 106.2 MHz FM and BBC Hereford and Worcester, which broadcasts on 94.7 MHz FM. Hereford FC has its own on-line radio station, RadioHerefordFC, which covers all matches home and away.

The Hereford Times is the city's only remaining weekly local newspaper, as the Hereford Journal ceased publication on 11 June 2014 and the Hereford admag followed suit in September 2018.

Local TV content is currently provided by BBC Midlands Today and ITV News Central.

=== Entertainment ===
The city's main theatre and cultural venue is the Courtyard Centre for the Arts, which was opened in 1998, replacing the New Hereford Theatre.

There is a multi-screen Odeon cinema in the Old Market precinct.

MFA Bowl (formerly known as TGS), home to a Ten Pin Bowling alley and Mini Golf course, is near the railway station.

There is a dedicated skatepark on Holmer Road.

=== Notable people ===
See Category:People from Hereford

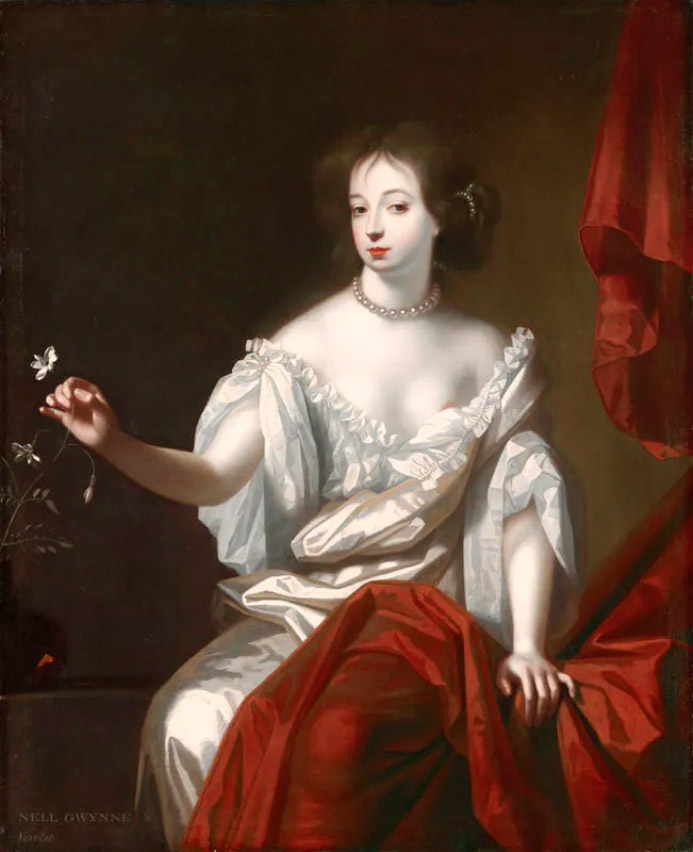
Hereford claims to be the birthplace of Nell Gwyn, 17th-century actress and mistress of King Charles II of England.

- Richard Hakluyt (1553–1616), an English writer who promoted the English colonisation of North America, was born in the town.
- John Kemble (c. 1599–1679), Catholic priest and martyr, born at Rhydicar Farm at nearby St Weonards.
- Thomas Traherne (1636 or 1637 – 1674), English metaphysical poet, cleric, theologian and writer.
- Nell Gwyn (1650–1687), David Garrick (1717–1779) and Sarah Siddons (1755–1831), actors and actresses, are all historical figures popularly associated with Hereford.
- The highwayman William Spiggot (1691–1721) declared, before his execution to the Ordinary's Accounts of Newgate Prison in London, that he was the son of an innkeeper from Hereford.
- Major-General Stringer Lawrence (1698–1775), first commander-in-chief of British troops in India, under whose command Robert Clive (1725–1774) served, was born in Hereford.
- William Samuel Symonds (1818–1887) was an English cleric, geologist and author from Hereford.
- Henry James, 1st Baron James of Hereford (1828–1911), known as Sir Henry James, was an Anglo-Welsh lawyer and statesman.
- The composer Sir Edward Elgar (1857–1934) lived in Hereford 1904–1911, when he was offered but declined the city mayoralty.
- Broadcaster Gilbert Harding (1907–1960) was born there when his father was master of the local workhouse, as was contemporary actress Beryl Reid OBE (1919–1996).
- Pianist, composer and radio broadcaster Austen Herbert Croom-Johnson (1909–1964) was born in Hereford. He made his later career and life in the US.
- Flight Lieutenant Jack Grisman (1914–1944), RAF officer who took part and was killed in the Great Escape.
- Al Vandenberg (1932–2012), American photographer, worked and died in Hereford.
- John Williamson (1937–2021), international economist and author of "What Washington Means by Policy Reform", was born in Hereford.
- Mike Osborne (1941–2007), notable jazz saxophonist active from 1966 to 1981, was born and spent the last decades of his life in Hereford suffering from mental illness.
- Frank Oz (born 1944), puppeteer for The Muppets and Yoda of Star Wars, was born in Hereford and lived there till aged five.
- Marian Stamp Dawkins (born 1945), biologist and ethologist, was born in Hereford
- Simon Carroll (1964–2009), studio potter, was born in Hereford.
- The original lineup of The Pretenders (formed 1978), with the exception of lead singer Chrissie Hynde, were from Hereford, as were the rock band Mott the Hoople (formed 1966).
- Ellie Goulding (born 1986), pop singer and songwriter, was born in Hereford.
- Lucy Letby (born 1990), serial killer, grew up in Hereford.

=== Sport ===
- The rugby union player and sports broadcaster Teddy Wakelam (1893–1963) was born in Hereford.
- Stewart Phillips (born 1961) is an English former footballer who spent most of his career at Hereford United. He has scored more goals for Hereford in the Football League than any other player. During his youth Phillips played for Hereford Lads Club. In 1979, nine years before joining West Bromwich Albion, he played in a benefit match for Len Cantello, that saw a team of white players play against a team of black players at The Hawthorns.
- Footballer Connor Wickham (born 1993) was born in the city.
- Jordan James (born 2004), professional footballer with Birmingham City and Wales national team.

=== Tourism and attractions ===
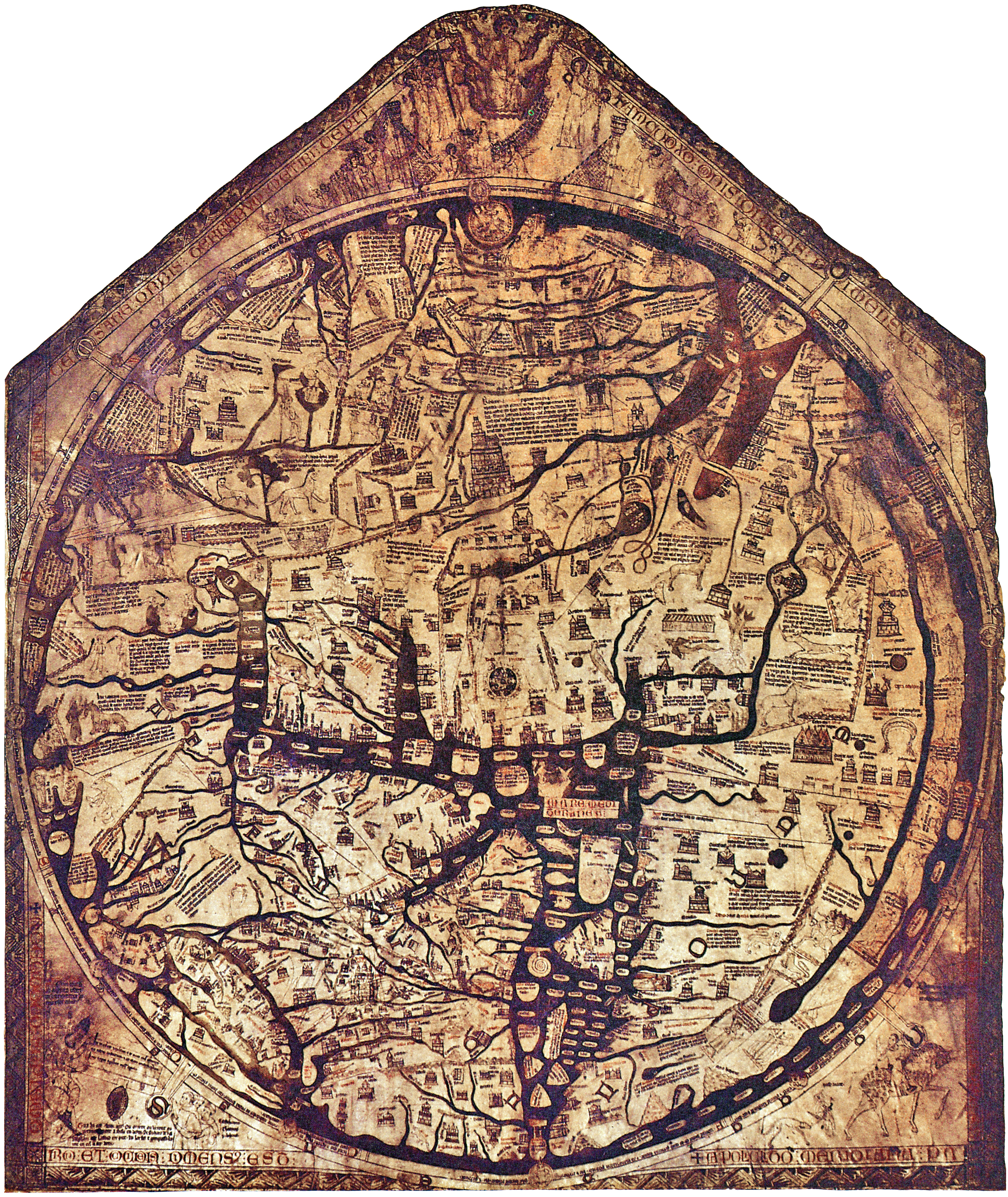
The cathedral is home to the Hereford Mappa Mundi, a map of the known world from the late 13th century

Hereford Cathedral dates from 1079 and contains the Mappa Mundi, a medieval map of the world dating from the 13th century, which was restored in the late 20th century. It also has a chained library.

The Old House, Hereford is an historic black and white house in the centre of High Town in Hereford. It is now a museum about life in the Jacobean era of the 1600s when it was built.

The Hereford Museum and Art Gallery, housed in a Victorian Gothic building and opened in 1874, presents artefacts, fine art, and decorative art associated with the local area.

The Museum of Cider is in the city, with a shop, and an interactive guide to producing the drink. It is a registered Charity Trust founded in the early 1970s by people who wanted to record the past, and the disappearing traditional art of cider making that had been practised for generations on the farms in the "Cider Counties". Situated in an old cider factory, it opened in 1981. In the spring/summer a cider festival is held, started in the mid-1980s, by the Friends of the Museum with the advice of Long Ashton Research Station near Bristol. It has a display of named cider apples and the apples are pressed in the old way. The museum holds in its Pomological Archive a number of records pertaining to apples and cider.

The Violette Szabo Museum is in Wormelow village, outside the city.

Holme Lacy House, now a hotel for a national chain, was built near the city by John Scudamore in the 1500s. It has played host to famous historical figures in its time.

==== Festivals ====
Several festivals are hosted in Hereford including the Beer on the Wye festival, the Hereford Food Festival, and the Three Choirs Festival.

== Twin towns ==
- Dillenburg, Germany
- Vierzon, France (since 1994)

== Freedom of the City ==
The following people and military units have received the Freedom of the City of Hereford.

=== Individuals ===
- John Edward Masefield: 1930.
- Graham John Turner: 31 October 2010.

=== Military units ===
- The Herefordshire Light Infantry: September 1945.
- RAF Hereford: April 1959.
- The King's Shropshire Light Infantry: April 1960.
- The Light Infantry: July 1971.
- HMS Antelope, RN: March 1976.
- The Royal British Legion: April 1976.
- The 22nd Special Air Services Regiment: April 1981.
- The Burma Star Association: April 1982.
- The Rifles: July 2008.

== See also ==
- Bobblestock
- List of Hereford MPs
- Herefordshire
- Hereford City Council elections for political history of the pre-1998 district council.
- College, Hereford
- Hinton & Hunderton
- Railways in Hereford
- Saxon Gate
