= Whitecross Hereford High School =

Location
- Three Elms Road; Hereford; Hereford, Herefordshire, HR4 0RN; England
- Coordinates: 52.0690°N 2.7471°W

Information
- Type: Academy
- Motto: "Excellence for all, excellence from all"
- School district: West Midlands
- Local authority: Herefordshire
- Department for Education URN: 139189 Tables
- Ofsted: Reports
- Headteacher: Tim Knapp
- Gender: Mixed
- Age: 11 to 16
- Enrolment: 949 as of January 2021
- Houses: Bromley, Hagloe, Moyle, Styre
- Colours: Green, Red, Yellow, Blue
- Website: www.whitecross.hereford.sch.uk

Whitecross Hereford High School is a mixed secondary school located in Hereford in the English county of Herefordshire.

Previously a community school administered by Herefordshire Council, Whitecross Hereford High School converted to academy status in January 2013. However the school continues to coordinate with Herefordshire Council for admissions. The school moved into new buildings in 2006.

Whitecross Hereford High School offers GCSEs and BTECs as programmes of study for pupils. The school also has a specialism in sports, and is an accredited sports college. The school currently has a roll of around 1000 students. A new head teacher, Tim Knapp, was appointed in 2016, succeeding Denise Strutt, who had held the position from 2001.
