= Edgar Street Grid =

Redevelopment project in Hereford, England

The Edgar Street Grid is a redevelopment project in the north of Hereford, England. Its estimated to cost almost £1 billion and intended to restore the city as a key shopping and business destination in the region. Construction was expected to start in 2010.

== Zones ==
The project creates three distinct but interlinked zones - the Retail/Leisure Quarter, on the council-owned 12.5-acre (51,000 m^{2}) old livestock market; the Civic Quarter, to contain a mix of public buildings, private offices, shops and restaurants; and the new Blackfriars Urban Village, where around 800 new homes will be built. A centrepiece to the regeneration will be a new canal basin at the end of the Herefordshire and Gloucestershire Canal, which is currently undergoing restoration.

== Cancellation ==
The project was officially scrapped in July 2010, despite over £10 million having been already spent.
