= List of electoral wards in Herefordshire =

This is a list of electoral divisions and wards in the ceremonial county of Herefordshire in the West Midlands. All changes since the re-organisation of local government following the passing of the Local Government Act 1972 are shown. The number of councillors elected for each electoral division or ward is shown in brackets.

== Unitary authority council ==
=== Herefordshire ===
Wards from 1 April 1998 (first election 1 May 1997) to 1 May 2003:

1. Aylestone (2)
2. Backbury (1)
3. Belmont (2)
4. Bircher (1)
5. Bringsty (1)
6. Bromyard (2)
7. Burmarsh (1)
8. Castle (1)
9. Central (2)
10. Clehonger (1)
11. Credenhill (1)
12. Dinmore Hill (1)
13. Doward (1)
14. Frome (1)
15. Golden Cross (1)
16. Golden Valley (1)
17. Hagley (1)
18. Hampton Court (1)
19. Hinton (2)
20. Hollington (1)
21. Holmer (2)
22. Hope End (2)
23. Kingsthorne (1)
24. Kington Town (1)
25. Ledbury (2)
26. Leominster East & South (2)
27. Leominster North (2)
28. Lyonshall with Titley (1)
29. Marcle Ridge (1)
30. Merbach (1)
31. Mortimer (1)
32. Old Gore (1)
33. Penyard (1)
34. Pontrilas (1)
35. Ross-on-Wye East (2)
36. Ross-on-Wye West (2)
37. St Martins (2)
38. St Nicholas (2)
39. Stoney Street (1)
40. Three Elms (2)
41. Tupsley (2)
42. Upton (1)
43. Weobley (1)
44. Wilton (1)

Wards from 1 May 2003 to 7 May 2015:

1. Aylestone (2)
2. Backbury (1)
3. Belmont (3)
4. Bircher (1)
5. Bringsty (1)
6. Bromyard (2)
7. Burghill, Holmer & Lyde (1)
8. Castle (1)
9. Central (1)
10. Credenhill (1)
11. Frome (1)
12. Golden Cross with Weobley (1)
13. Golden Valley North (1)
14. Golden Valley South (1)
15. Hagley (1)
16. Hampton Court (1)
17. Hollington (1)
18. Hope End (2)
19. Kerne Bridge (1)
20. Kington Town (1)
21. Ledbury (3)
22. Leominster North (2)
23. Leominster South (2)
24. Llangarron (1)
25. Mortimer (1)
26. Old Gore (1)
27. Pembridge & Lyonshall with Titley (1)
28. Penyard (1)
29. Pontrilas (1)
30. Ross-on-Wye East (2)
31. Ross-on-Wye West (2)
32. St Martins & Hinton (3)
33. St Nicholas (2)
34. Stoney Street (1)
35. Sutton Walls (1)
36. Three Elms (3)
37. Tupsley (3)
38. Upton (1)
39. Valletts (1)
40. Wormsley Ridge (1)

Wards from 7 May 2015 to present:

1. Arrow (1)
2. Aylestone Hill (1)
3. Backbury (1)
4. Belmont Rural (1)
5. Birch (1)
6. Bircher (1)
7. Bishops Frome & Cradley (1)
8. Bobblestock (1)
9. Bromyard Bringsty (1)
10. Bromyard West (1)
11. Castle (1)
12. Central (1)
13. College (1)
14. Credenhill (1)
15. Dinedor Hill (1)
16. Eign Hill (1)
17. Golden Valley North (1)
18. Golden Valley South (1)
19. Greyfriars (1)
20. Hagley (1)
21. Hampton (1)
22. Hinton & Hunderton (1)
23. Holmer (1)
24. Hope End (1)
25. Kerne Bridge (1)
26. Kings Acre (1)
27. Kington (1)
28. Ledbury North (1)
29. Ledbury South (1)
30. Ledbury West (1)
31. Leominster East (1)
32. Leominster North & Rural (1)
33. Leominster South (1)
34. Leominster West (1)
35. Llangarron (1)
36. Mortimer (1)
37. Newton Farm (1)
38. Old Gore (1)
39. Penyard (1)
40. Queenswood (1)
41. Red Hill (1)
42. Ross East (1)
43. Ross North (1)
44. Ross West (1)
45. Saxon Gate (1)
46. Stoney Street (1)
47. Sutton Walls (1)
48. Three Crosses (1)
49. Tupsley (1)
50. Weobley (1)
51. Whitecross (1)
52. Widemarsh (1)
53. Wormside (1)

== Former county council ==
=== Hereford and Worcester ===
Electoral Divisions from 1 April 1974 (first election 12 April 1973) to 2 May 1985:

1. Alvechurch & Cofton Hackett (1)
2. Belbroughton (1)
3. Bewdley No. 1 (1)
4. Bewdley No. 2 (1)
5. Bromsgrove East (1)
6. Bromsgrove North (1)
7. Bromsgrove North West (1)
8. Bromsgrove South (1)
9. Bromsgrove South East (1)
10. Bromsgrove West (1)
11. Bromyard (1)
12. Chaddesley Corbett (1)
13. Croome (1)
14. Dore & Bredwardine (1)
15. Droitwich North (1)
16. Droitwich Rural No. 1 (1)
17. Droitwich Rural No. 2 (1)
18. Droitwich Rural No. 3 (1)
19. Droitwich South (1)
20. Evesham East (1)
21. Evesham Rural No. 1 (1)
22. Evesham Rural No. 2 (1)
23. Evesham Rural No. 3 (1)
24. Evesham West (1)
25. Hagley (1)
26. Hereford No. 1 (Bartonsham) (1)
27. Hereford No. 2 (2)
28. Hereford No. 3 (Holmer) (1)
29. Hereford No. 4 (St Martins) (2)
30. Hereford No. 5 (North Tupsley) (1)
31. Hereford No. 6 (South Tupsley) (1)
32. Hereford Rural No. 1 (1)
33. Hereford Rural No. 2 (1)
34. Hereford Rural No. 3 (1)
35. Kidderminster Baxter (1)
36. Kidderminster Oldington (1)
37. Kidderminster Park (1)
38. Kidderminster Rowland Hill (1)
39. Kidderminster St Georges (1)
40. Kidderminster St Johns (2)
41. Kidderminster St Marys (1)
42. Kington (1)
43. Ledbury No. 1 (1)
44. Ledbury No. 2 (1)
45. Leominster & Wigmore No. 1 (1)
46. Leominster & Wigmore No. 2 (1)
47. Leominster (1)
48. Malvern East (1)
49. Malvern North (1)
50. Malvern South (1)
51. Malvern West (1)
52. Martley No. 1 (1)
53. Martley No. 2 (1)
54. Pershore No. 1 (1)
55. Pershore No. 2 (1)
56. Pershore No. 3 (1)
57. Powick (1)
58. Redditch No. 1 (1)
59. Redditch No. 2 (1)
60. Redditch No. 3 (1)
61. Redditch No. 4 (1)
62. Redditch No. 5 (1)
63. Redditch No. 6 (2)
64. Ross & Whitchurch No. 1 (1)
65. Ross & Whitchurch No. 2 (1)
66. Ross-on-Wye (1)
67. Stoke Prior (1)
68. Stourport No. 1 (1)
69. Stourport No. 2 (1)
70. Stourport No. 3 (1)
71. Tenbury (1)
72. Upton-on-Severn (1)
73. Weobley (1)
74. Wolverley & Cookley (1)
75. Worcester No. 1 (All Saints) (1)
76. Worcester No. 2 (Bedwardine) (1)
77. Worcester No. 3 (Claines) (1)
78. Worcester No. 4 (Holy Trinity) (1)
79. Worcester No. 5 (Nunnery) (1)
80. Worcester No. 6 (St Barnabas) (1)
81. Worcester No. 7 (St Clement) (1)
82. Worcester No. 8 (St John) (1)
83. Worcester No. 9 (St Martin) (1)
84. Worcester No. 10 (St Nicholas) (1)
85. Worcester No. 11 (St Peter) (1)
86. Worcester No. 12 (St Stephen) (1)
87. Wythall North (1)
88. Wythall South (1)

Electoral Divisions from 2 May 1985 to 1 April 1998 (county abolished):

1. Alvechurch (1)
2. Barnt Green (1)
3. Batchley (1)
4. Bedwardine (1)
5. Bowbrook (1)
6. Bredon (1)
7. Brinton Park (1)
8. Broadway (1)
9. Bromsgrove North (1)
10. Bromsgrove South (1)
11. Bromsgrove West (1)
12. Bromyard (1)
13. Central & St Nicholas (1)
14. Chaddesley (1)
15. Church Hill (1)
16. Claines (1)
17. College (1)
18. Cookley Wolverley & Wribbenhall (1)
19. Crabbs Cross (1)
20. Croome (1)
21. Dinmore (1)
22. Dore & Bredwardine (1)
23. Droitwich Rural (1)
24. Droitwich South (1)
25. Droitwich Town (1)
26. Evesham Hampton (1)
27. Evesham Town (1)
28. Habberley & Blakebrook (1)
29. Hagley & Furlongs (1)
30. Hallow (1)
31. Hinton & Hunderton (1)
32. Hoobrook (1)
33. Hope End (1)
34. Hurcott (1)
35. Inkberrow (1)
36. Kington & Wigmore (1)
37. Ledbury (1)
38. Leominster (1)
39. Leominster Rural (1)
40. Lodge Park (1)
41. Malvern Chase (1)
42. Malvern Langland (1)
43. Malvern Link (1)
44. Malvern Trinity (1)
45. Matchborough (1)
46. Mitton (1)
47. Nunnery (1)
48. Pershore Town (1)
49. Powick (1)
50. Puxton (1)
51. Redditch Central (1)
52. Redditch West (1)
53. Redhill & Newton Farm (1)
54. Rock & Bewdley (1)
55. Ross Rural (1)
56. Ross-on-Wye (1)
57. Rubery (1)
58. Severn (1)
59. St Barnabas (1)
60. St Chad (1)
61. St Clement (1)
62. St John (1)
63. St Martin (1)
64. St Peter (1)
65. St Stephen (1)
66. Tenbury (1)
67. The Littletons (1)
68. Thinghill (1)
69. Three Elms (1)
70. Tupsley (1)
71. Uffdown (1)
72. Weobley (1)
73. Winyates (1)
74. Woodvale (1)
75. Wormelow (1)
76. Wythall (1)

== Former district councils ==
=== Hereford ===
Wards from 1 April 1974 (first election 7 June 1973) to 3 May 1979:

Wards from 3 May 1979 to 1 April 1998 (district abolished):

=== Leominster ===
Wards from 1 April 1974 (first election 7 June 1973) to 3 May 1979:

Wards from 3 May 1979 to 1 April 1998 (district abolished):

=== Malvern Hills ===
See: List of electoral wards in Worcestershire#Malvern Hills

=== South Herefordshire ===
Wards from 1 April 1974 (first election 7 June 1973) to 3 May 1979:

Wards from 3 May 1979 to 2 May 1991:

Wards from 2 May 1991 to 1 April 1998 (district abolished):

1. Backbury (1)
2. Broad Oak (1)
3. Burghill (1)
4. Burmarsh (1)
5. Clehonger East (2)
6. Clehonger West (1)
7. Credenhill (1)
8. Dinedor Hill (1)
9. Dinmore Hill ()
10. Doward (1)
11. Fownhope (1)
12. Garron (1)
13. Golden Valley (1)
14. Gorsley (1)
15. Hagley (1)
16. Harewood End (1)
17. Hollington (1)
18. Kingsthorne (1)
19. Merbach (1)
20. Munstone (1)
21. Olchon (1)
22. Old Gore (1)
23. Penyard (1)
24. Pontrilas (1)
25. Ross-on-Wye East (4)
26. Ross-on-Wye East (3)
27. Stoney Street (1)
28. Swainshill (1)
29. Thinghill (1)
30. Tram Inn (1)
31. Walford (1)
32. Whitfield (1)
33. Wilton (1)

== Electoral wards by constituency ==
Wards as they existed on 1 December 2020.

=== Hereford and South Herefordshire ===
Aylestone Hill; Belmont Rural; Birch; Bobblestock; Central; College; Dinedor Hill; Eign Hill; Golden Valley North; Golden Valley South; Greyfriars; Hinton & Hunderton; Kerne Bridge; Kings Acre; Llangarron; Newton Farm; Penyard; Red Hill; Ross East; Ross North; Ross West; Saxon Gate; Stoney Street; Tupsley; Whitecross; Widemarsh; Wormside.

=== North Herefordshire ===
Arrow; Backbury; Bircher; Bishops Frome & Cradley; Bromyard Bringsty; Bromyard West; Castle; Credenhill; Hagley; Hampton; Holmer; Hope End; Kington; Ledbury North; Ledbury South; Ledbury West; Leominster East; Leominster North & Rural; Leominster South; Leominster West; Mortimer; Old Gore; Queenswood; Sutton Walls; Three Crosses; Weobley.

== See also ==
- List of parliamentary constituencies in Herefordshire and Worcestershire
