= Hereford College (disambiguation) =

Hereford College is a self-governed residential college at the University of Virginia. Hereford College may also refer to one of the following;

- Hereford College of Arts, formerly Herefordshire College of Art, a further and higher education college in the United Kingdom
- Hereford College of Education, a former teacher training college affiliated to the University of Birmingham
- Herefordshire College of Technology, a further education college in Hereford, UK
