= Physical disability =

Limitation on a person's physical functioning, mobility, dexterity or stamina

A physical disability is a limitation on a person's physical functioning or limitations in executing activities (e.g. walking or eating). The term physical disability is very broad, and a range of disabilities are included. Some examples of physical disabilities include: blindness, deafness, respiratory disorders, epilepsy and some genetic disorders. The severity of impairments and restriction in daily activities vary widely between different types of physical disability. An inclusive and accessible environment may mitigate many restrictions.

The World Health Organization does not differentiate between physical and mental disabilities.

People with physical disabilities may face persecution and discrimination.

== Causes ==
Physical disabilities can be caused by a variety of factors. While some physical disabilities can be acquired before birth (pre-natal), others might be a result of a physical injury or illness (post-natal). Some disabilities may be gained before or after birth, such as vision loss.

Prenatal disabilities are acquired before birth. These may be due to diseases or substances that the mother has been exposed to during pregnancy, embryonic or fetal developmental accidents or genetic disorders. Perinatal disabilities are acquired between some weeks before to up to four weeks after birth in humans. These can be due to prolonged lack of oxygen or obstruction of the respiratory tract, damage to the brain during birth (due to the early umbilical cord clamping, for example) or the baby being born prematurely. These may also be caused due to genetic disorders or accidents.

Post-natal disabilities are gained after birth. Disabilities can be gained throughout the entire life. They can be due to accidents, injuries, obesity, infection or other illnesses. Research suggests the leading cause of post-natal disabilities to be road traffic injuries.

== Types ==
Physical disability is a broad term and includes many different types of impairments. Some might severely restrict a persons ability to execute daily functions and cause them to rely on the help of a care-taker. Others might rely on assistive technology, such as a wheelchair or a hearing aid.

Mobility impairment includes limb loss or impairment, poor manual dexterity, paraplegia and damage to one or multiple organs of the body. Depending on the condition, impairment varies widely in severity.

Sensory impairments include partial or complete loss of one (or more) of the senses. The most common sensory impairments are visual impairments and hearing loss. Deaf and hard of hearing people have a rich culture and benefit from learning sign language for communication purposes. People who are only partially deaf can sometimes make use of hearing aids to improve their hearing ability. While tactile, gustatory and olfactory disabilities do exist, they occur less common.

Some people with disabilities might have multiple disabilities, such as one or more co-occurring cognitive and physical disability.

== Assistive technology ==
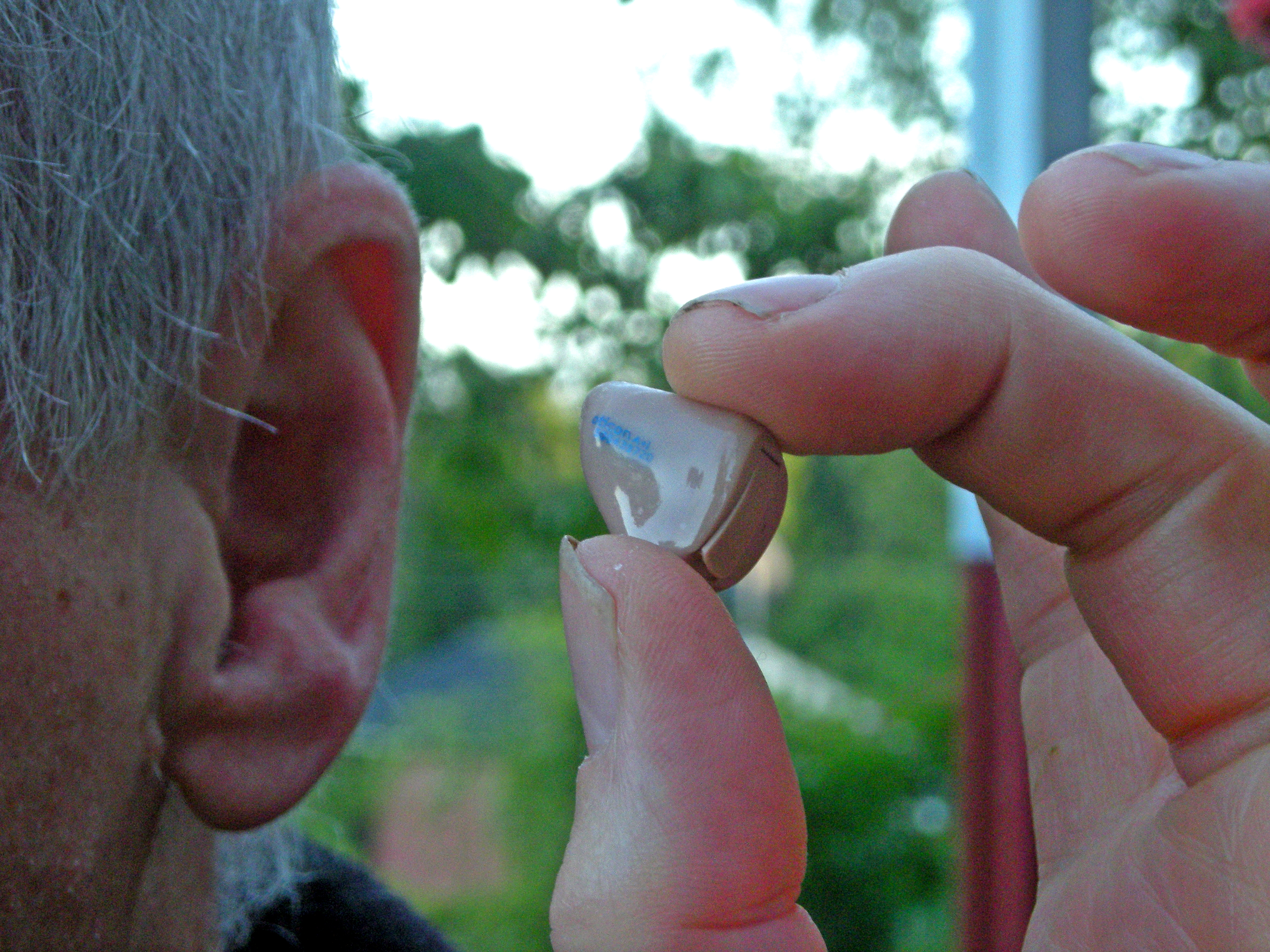
In-the-canal hearing aid

Management of physical disability depends on the condition. Pain is a significant problem for many persons with physical disabilities. Many challenges from inaccessible physical environments can be countered with assistive devices, which advance inclusion.

- Mobility aids: wheelchairs, walkers, canes, and prosthetic limbs.
- Hearing aids: for people with hearing loss.
- Visual aids: including guide dogs, canes, and screen readers.
- Communication devices: augmentative and alternative communication devices for people with expressive language impairments.

== See also ==
- Disabilities affecting intellectual abilities – Subnormal intellectual functioning (cognitive disorder)
- Developmental disability – Disability beginning before adulthood
- Mental disorder – Medical condition
