= Blind Young Things =

- Cutting Edge episode
- Episode no.: Season 18; Episode 4
- Directed by: Zac Beattie
- Original air date: 30 April 2007
- Running time: 60 minutes (including commercials)

Episode chronology
← Previous "Killer Road"	Next → "Meet the Au Pairs"

"Blind Young Things" is a 2007 British documentary fim directed and produced by Zac Beattie. The film is about students at the Royal National College for the Blind in Hereford. The film was shown on Channel 4 as part of the Cutting Edge documentary strand, and aired on 30 April 2007. It won a Royal Television Society award for Channel Four and the Cutting Edge team in 2008.

== Background ==
Zac Beattie and his team spent several months at the college researching for the programme. Beattie, a producer with North One Television which made the film on behalf of Channel 4 said; "I have worked in specialist educational environments before, but I had almost no experience of people with a visual impairment or blindness. I wanted to make a documentary with some of the students to explore with them their daily lives. It is interesting to see what is different for them and what is the same; their experiences of daily life can be fundamentally altered by their visual impairment yet that doesn't stop them from having the same hopes and fears as a sighted person."

== Synopsis ==
The film follows three young students during their first term at the college, where for many it is their first time away from home.

Steve Markham, 18, from Rotherham is a keen sportsman and talented musician who has been completely blind since birth. He is studying Performing Arts with the aim of moving on to university and plans a career teaching drama and music. Daniel Angus from Bradford is a budding songwriter and singer whose ambition is to develop a career in the music industry. He is also blind and hopes that his time at college will help him improve his confidence, mobility and daily living skills. Selina Litt, from Leicester is blind in one eye and experiencing deteriorating sight in her other eye. She is at RNC to improve her independence before seeking employment in the accounting profession.

The film examines their individual journeys towards greater independence as they encounter the unique challenges that being visually impaired presents. The programme also looks at how they deal with the everyday issues that affect all teenagers, such as sex, relationships, partying and their future plans after graduation.

== Reception ==
The film helped to raise the profile of the college, with hits on their website almost trebling. RNC also received a surge of inquiries from prospective students.

Reviewing the documentary for BBC Radio 4's In Touch, the opera singer Denise Leigh, who is herself visually impaired was generally positive about it. "I think it broke down barriers, I don't think it was ground breaking in any sense at all, but I think it showed that there are less divisions between the blind teenage community adolescents - whatever you want to call them - and the sighted college community." On the same programme, the Time Out television critic Alkarim Jivani said "[...] I feel that the great thing about this documentary, if there is one distinguishing factor of good documentaries, it makes us feel that there's less that divides from each other than joins us."

== Awards ==
In 2008, the documentary won the Royal Television Society's Educational Impact in the Primetime Schedule Award. Judges called the show "brilliantly observed".
