= Gerald Caldwell Siordet =

English painter

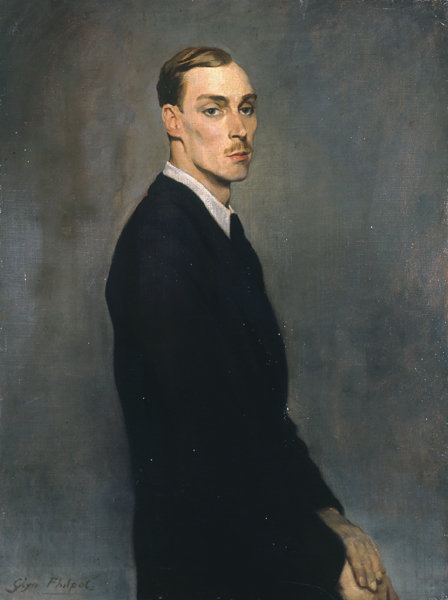
2nd Lieutenant Gerald Caldwell Siordet M.C., Rifle Brigade 13th Battalion, by Glyn Philpot

Gerald Caldwell Siordet (13 June 1885 – 9 February 1917) was an English poet and a 2nd Lieutenant in the Rifle Brigade 13th Battalion who died during World War I.

== Early life ==
The Siordets was a Huguenot family from Switzerland, near Geneva, on the France border. In the 18th century they moved to London. They were businessmen: bankers and shipping agents. George Crosbie Siordet, Gerald Caldwell Siordet’s father, was co-founder of "Siordet and Meyer."

Siordet studied at Clifton College and Balliol College, Oxford.

== Career ==
After Oxford, Siordet lived in London trying to make a living as artist, poet, and critic. He worked at the New English Art Club, the Fine Art Society, the Medici Society, the Victoria and Albert Museum. He also wrote freelance reviews for The Studio (magazine) and other art magazines.

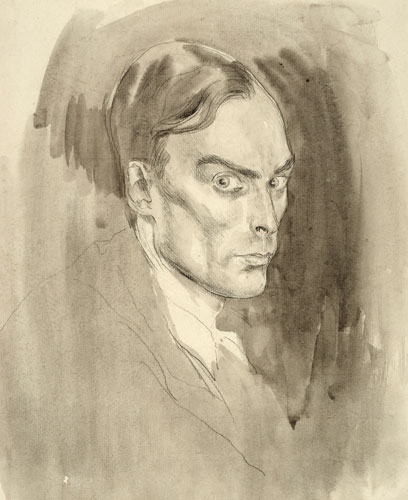
Gerald C. Siordet, Drawing, 1912, by Brian Hatton

Siordet was friend with Glyn Philpot, Gerald Spencer Pryse, Henry Justice Ford, John Singer Sargent, Brian Hatton and William Morris’s wife, Jane Morris (née Burden). Siordet met Brian Hatton in January 1906. In January 1912 Hatton set up a studio in London and shared it with Siordet: they called it The Bronze Door. Hatton enlisted in August 1914 as trooper in the Queen's Own Worcestershire Hussars, a Yeomanry regiment of the British Army. Before leaving for his service, he sold a picture of Siordet wearing a helmet for only 35 guineas. When Siordet heard of Hatton's death during the Battle of Katia on Sunday 23 April 1916, he asked to Captain Val Burkhardt (Siordet's cousin), who was serving in Egypt, for more information. Burkhardt managed for a memorial

2 Lieut Brian Hatton Worcester Yeomanry. A fine artist and a gallant soldier. 23rd April 1916 R.I.P

to be put on the place of the battle.

With the name Gerald Caldwell he had two poems printed in the Times. The first poem, "Autumn 1914" was printed on 13 November 1914. On 30 November 1915, Siordet's second poem To the Dead was first print in the Times; it was subsequently reprinted in A Crown of Amaranth (1917) and included in the collection A Book of Verse of the Great War (1917). Siordet's contribution to the collection has been highlighted by The Dublin Review (1918) and by Henry Seidel Canby in Education by Violence: Essays on the War and the Future (1919).

== World War I ==
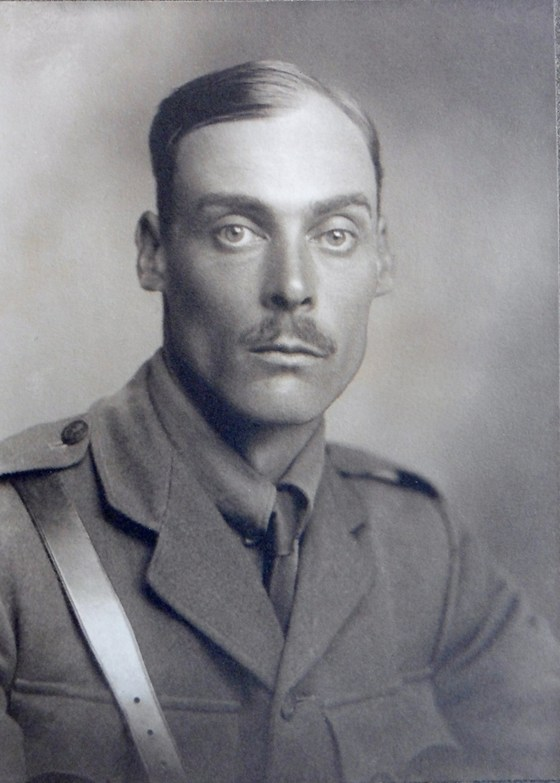
Gerald Caldwell Siordet (1885-1917)

In 1914, at the beginning of World War I, Siordet enlisted and at first he joined as a private. In July 1915, he was promoted 2nd Lieutenant in France while with the Rifle Brigade, 13th Battalion. On 1 July 1916, during the Battle of the Somme, he received the Military Cross for "conspicuous gallantry" in a failed attack that killed one of his closest friends, Geoffrey Watkins Smith. The motivation for his military cross was:

After his company commander had been killed he rallied the company under heavy fire, and consolidated the position gained

Siordet joined the Mesopotamian campaign in January 1917 with the King's Own Royal Regiment (Lancaster), 6th Battalion.

== Death ==
Siordet died on 9 February 1917, leading an attack on the Turkish position near Kut-al-Amara. His body was never recovered. His name is inscribed in the Chapel Passage, West Wall, at Balliol College, together with those other Balliol College's alumni lost during World War I.

After Siordet's death, his sister, Vera Siordet asked painter Glyn Philpot to help her to publish a volume of her brother poetry and drawings.
