= Hoople =

Hoople may refer to:

== People ==
- William Howard Hoople (1868–1922), American businessman and religious leader

== Places ==
- Hoople, North Dakota
- Hoople Creek, Stormont County, Ontario
- Hoople Island, Ontario

== Other ==
- Hoople (mobility aid), aid for visually-impaired people
- Mott the Hoople, British rock group
  - The Hoople, album by Mott the Hoople
