= The Old House, Hereford =

Jacobean house turned museum in Hereford, UK

Coordinates: 52.05649°N 2.7149°W

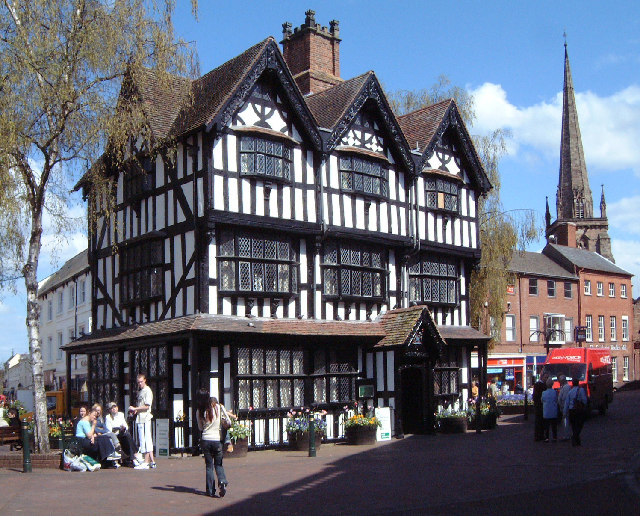
The Old House, Hereford

The Old House is a distinctive black and white half-timbered house in High Town, Hereford, England, built in 1621. It was restored in the 19th century and became a museum of Jacobean life in 1929.

The building was renamed the Black and White House Museum in 2017. It is part of Herefordshire Council's Museum Service.

== History ==
The Old House is a well-preserved half-timbered Jacobean building in the centre of Hereford. It was built in 1621 as part of Butchers' Row. In 1816, other buildings on the row started to be demolished and now, Old House is the only remaining house from the original row. The house has been used by butchers, ironmongers, and bankers during its history.

The Old House was restored in 1882. New carvings were added in 1883 by Robert Clarke and the ground floor was altered in 1882–3 by Edward Henry Lingen Barker.

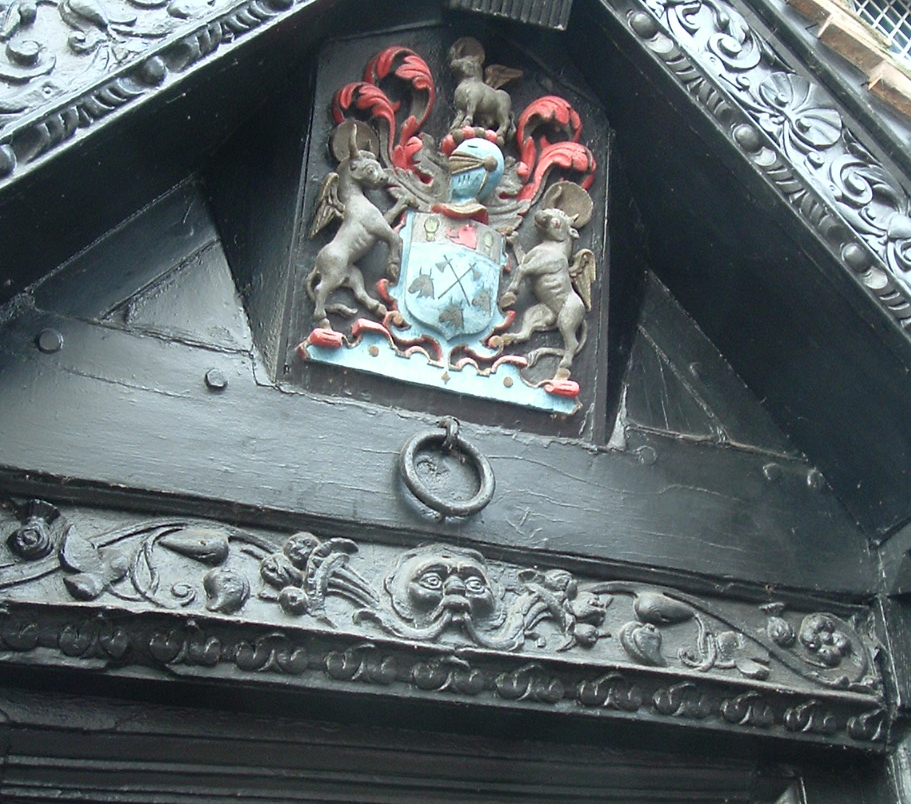
The Old House in Hereford (now called the Black and White House Museum) features the Butchers Guild coat of arms

The coat of arms above the front door is that of the Worshipful Company of Butchers, although Hereford is reported to have had its own butchers' guild when the house was built.

The fireplace in the south east room came from another house in the city and is probably 15th century. The moulded frieze on the second floor is early 18th century. In a 1931 report, the house was described as the "best preserved example of a timber framed house in the city".

The Old House became a Grade I listed building in 1952.

== Museum ==
Since 1929, the Old House has been a museum presenting life in Jacobean times. The house is furnished in the style of the period. Objects on display include baby walkers and wall paintings. The museum's beds include at least one from Penrhyn Old Hall. In 2017, new embroidered bedspreads were displayed on the beds in the museum.

The museum has displays on three floors. Access to the upper floors is by stairs, there is flat access around the ground floor.

In 2017, Herefordshire Council refurbished the Old House and changed its name to The Black and White House Museum.

== See also ==
- Grade I listed buildings in Herefordshire
- List of museums in Herefordshire
- Hereford Museum and Art Gallery
