= Simon Carroll =

British studio potter (1964–2009)

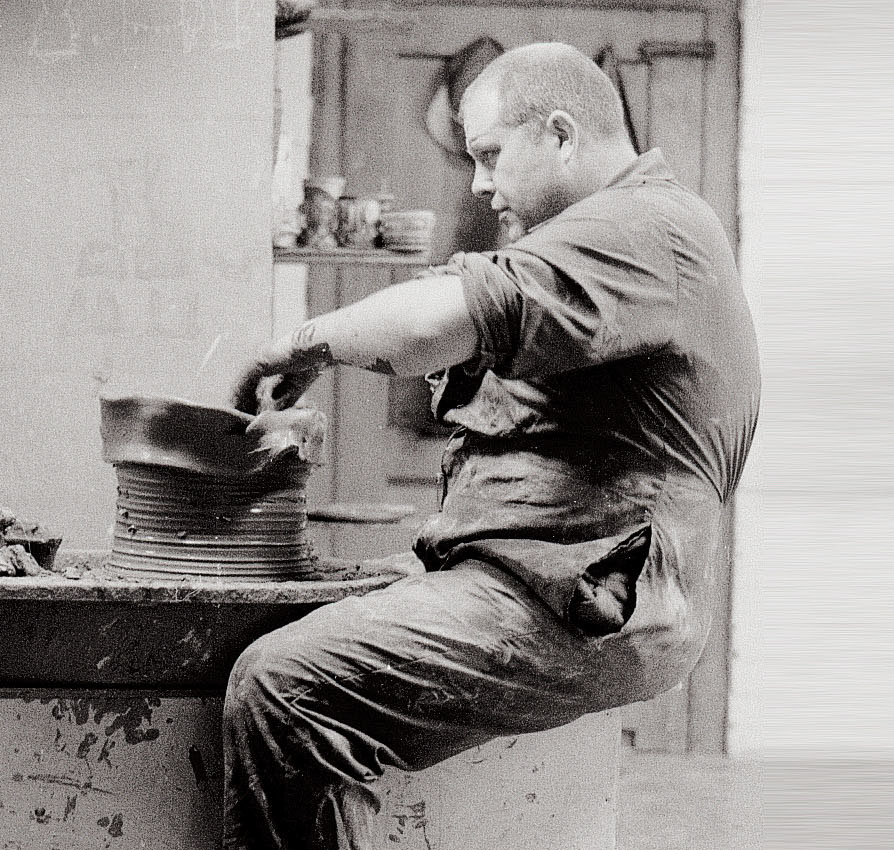
- Born: 13 November 1964; Hereford, UK
- Died: 31 March 2009 (aged 44); Hereford, UK
- Education: Hereford College of Arts
- Alma mater: UWE Bristol
- Occupation: Potter

Simon Carroll (1964-2009) was a British studio potter. Carroll has permanent collections at the V&A museum London and Amgueddfa Cymru.

== Life ==
Carroll was born in Hereford and educated at Hereford College of Arts followed by UWE Bristol where he was taught by Mo Jupp and Walter Keeler. Intrigued by the notion of touch, he became artist in residence at the Royal National College for the Blind in the early 1990s.

A breakthrough show at Tate St Ives, beach drawings and the Arts Foundation Prize, Carroll exhibited, lectured and demonstrated his craft from Hong Kong to the United States gaining international recognition.

Carroll considered Picasso and Matisse important influences and for his Collins Gallery show in Glasgow cited "Staffordshire slipware, Elizabethan ruffles, an American military jacket I saw in a book, three Mexican sombreros and a fish".

== Death ==
Having been diagnosed with liver cancer, Carroll focused on his drawing and died in Hereford in March 2009. Emmanuel Cooper in his Guardian obituary described Carroll as... “one of the more adventurous, fearless and challenging of the younger generation of potters”.

Carroll was survived by his parents and two brothers.

== Permanent collections ==
- Victoria & Albert Museum, London
- Amgueddfa Cymru – National Museum Wales

== Selected exhibitions ==
- 2006 Tate St Ives
- 2014 Corvi-Mora
- 2014 V&A Museum
- 2015 Ruthin Craft Centre

== Publications ==
- 2015: Simon Carroll: Expressionist Potter • ISBN 978-1-905865-69-7
