= National School of Blacksmithing =

Coordinates: 52.0170°N 2.6556°W

The National School of Blacksmithing (NSB) is part of Herefordshire and Ludlow College, a college of further education (FE). It is located at the Centre for Rural Crafts in Holme Lacy, approximately 6 miles (10 km) from the city of Hereford, Herefordshire, England.

== History ==
The school was founded in 1946 in Hereford. It moved to its present purpose-built facility (which it shares with Hereford School of Farriery) in 2000, having previously been situated at HCT's Folly Lane, Hereford campus. (Hereford School of Farriery previously occupied a site on Burcott Road, Hereford). The new Centre for Rural Crafts was opened by The Princess Royal.

=== Students ===
NSB students come from a broad range of ages, backgrounds and nationalities. The school has a tradition of training international students from the Commonwealth, USA and Europe as well as the UK.

=== The Centre for Rural Crafts ===
The move to the Centre for Rural Crafts in 2000 meant considerable expansion as the facility now contains 79 hearths in total; 42 in the blacksmithing bays, and 36 in the farriery bays, as well as a separate demonstration forge area with seating for 36 students.

Organised into 3 'bays' with 14 hearths and anvils per bay, each of the 3 blacksmithing bays has its own powerhammers, flypress and other associated equipment and impedimenta.

The school also has its own welding and fabrication section where MIG, MAG, TIG, and MMA disciplines are taught as well brazing, soldering and sheet-metalworking.

Technical drawing, design, graphics and theory classes take place in a range of classrooms above the IT suite and subject staff offices.

=== Courses ===
The NSB runs full-time training courses from one to three years duration, as well as block release courses for apprentices and other craftsmen/craftswomen in industry. The school also runs night classes for those unable to take up full-time training. In addition, seminars (such as for WCB judges and the National Heritage Ironwork Group) also take place there. The school jointly runs a B.A. degree in Artist Blacksmithing with Hereford College of Arts.
