= Hoople (mobility aid) =

Hoop-shaped mobility aid

A Hoople is a hoop-shaped mobility aid used by some blind and visually impaired people, and was designed to help them navigate their way over rough terrain or in a rural environment. It performs a similar role to a white cane, but is designed for use in conditions where using a white cane can be difficult, for example, in snow or on sand. It can also be used by young children as a pre-cane aid or by people with arthritis and other medical conditions which would make the use of a traditional cane difficult. The Hoople is designed to detect obstructions, much like cat's whiskers, through both tactile and audio feedback. Because the Hoople is moved along the ground rather than being moved from side to side like a cane, the user can also detect drops two paces ahead, narrow gaps or similar potential obstructions on either side of the path ahead. The Hoople was invented in the early 1990s by Clive Ellis and Tony Larkin, two lecturers at the Royal National College for the Blind in Hereford, United Kingdom.

The Hoople is made to order with five different sizes available.

== See also ==
- Blindness
- Guide dog
- Guide horse
- Assistive cane
- White Cane Safety Day
