= Royal National College for the Blind =

College in Hereford, UK

Coordinates: 52°04′05″N 2°42′25″W

The Royal National College for the Blind
- The Royal National College for the Blind's logo
- Type: Further education college
- Established: 1872
- President: Jessica White
- Principal: Lucy Proctor
- Administrative staff: 175 teaching, 56 student support
- Students: 95 (2024)
- Location: Hereford, United Kingdom
- Campus: Venns Lane, Hereford
- Website: www.rnc.ac.uk

The Royal National College for the Blind (RNC) is a co-educational specialist residential college of further education based in the English city of Hereford. Students who attend the college are aged 16 to 25 and blind or partially sighted. They can study a wide range of qualifications at RNC, from academic subjects such as English and Mathematics to more vocational topics such as Massage and Complementary Therapies. Alongside regular further education subjects and vocational training, the college offers training in mobility, assistive technology, Braille, independent living skills and personal development.

Founded in 1872 in London as the Royal Normal College and Academy for the Blind, the college had a number of homes before moving to its campus in Hereford; it was renamed The Royal National College for the Blind in the late 1970s. It has been a pioneer in the education of visually impaired people in Britain since the Victorian era, and, as of 2010, is the only college for visually impaired students in the United Kingdom to have been awarded Beacon Status in recognition of its outstanding teaching and learning.

RNC hosts the UK's first VI Sports Academy, having begun as the home of the first football academy for visually impaired players and the England blind football team. It hosted the 2010 World Blind Football Championship and also served as a training facility for participants in the 2012 Paralympic Games. The college is actively involved in the development of assistive technology, including student participation in the Tech Novice Cafe, run for members of the public who are not confident in computer use. Two notable devices were developed at RNC; the Mountbatten Brailler, an electronic braille writer, and the T3, a talking tactile device that helped with the reading of maps and diagrams.

Early in the 21st century, there was departmental restructuring at the college, and a significant redevelopment and modernisation of the Hereford campus. The campus, located on Venns Lane, Hereford, is home to RNC's teaching, residential and leisure facilities. Students live in halls of residence, which enable them to gain a level of independence within the college environment. RNC operates a leisure facility, thePoint4, which is open to the public.

The college is a registered charity (number 1000388), and its patron is King Charles III. There are several high-profile supporters, including Dave Clarke, former captain of the England and Great Britain blind football teams. RNC has a number of notable people among its alumni, including former Home Secretary David Blunkett. The college was the subject of a 2007 film for the Channel 4 Cutting Edge documentary strand, which followed three students through their first term of study. The film won a 2008 Royal Television Society Award.

== History ==
=== Early years ===
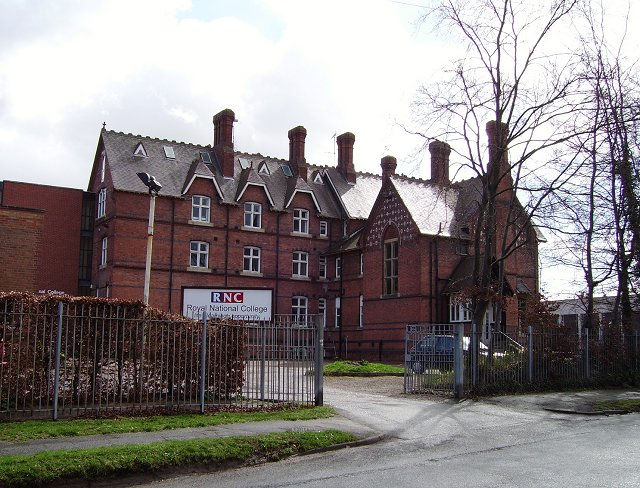
The Royal National College for the Blind

The college was established in 1871 by the English philanthropist Thomas Rhodes Armitage and the American anti-slavery campaigner Francis Joseph Campbell, who lost his sight as a young boy. Campbell had originally planned to establish a college for the blind in the United States, but was persuaded by Armitage that London would be a more suitable location. At the time, English schools for the blind did not provide their students with the skills to become independent and, dissatisfied with this situation, Armitage dreamed of establishing a school whose emphasis was on music and which would prepare its students for careers as organists, piano tuners, and music teachers.

With donations of £3,000, the college enrolled its first two students on 1 March 1872. Queen Victoria became its first patron, while several prominent members of her family became vice-patrons. Among those to become governors of the college were Duke of Westminster, Lord Shaftesbury, Lord Lichfield and W. H. Smith. At the time of its founding it was called "The Royal Normal College and Academy for the Blind". The word normal, more commonly used in American English, referred to the teacher training offered by the college, with Campbell recruiting many of his teaching staff from the United States.

Originally located in two small buildings on Anerley Hill near London's Crystal Palace, the college later moved to larger accommodation at Westow Street, Upper Norwood where the name "College Green" commemorates the college – its grounds are now Westow Park – after rapidly outgrowing its original premises. In its early days, the college was considered very progressive and experimental in its approach to education. A history of the college on its website describes the curriculum as "liberal and advanced for its day", and emphasis was placed on physical activities such as swimming, cycling and roller-skating. Students even took part in a morning of tobogganing following a heavy fall of snow. By the end of the 19th century, the college had over 200 students. Until World War II the college admitted 11- to 15-year-olds, but in 1945 the principal of RNC and headmaster of Worcester College for the Blind came to an agreement that Worcester would provide secondary education and RNC would take students over the age of 16.

As well as being one of its founders, Francis Joseph Campbell served as RNC's first principal, from 1871 until his retirement in 1912. He was knighted as a Knight Bachelor by King Edward VII in 1909, for his services to blind people. He was succeeded by his son, Guy Marshall Campbell, and following his death in 1929 Guy's widow, Louie Bealby Campbell took over the position. The role of principal passed outside the Campbell family for the first time upon Louie Bealby Campbell's retirement in 1934.

=== Relocation ===
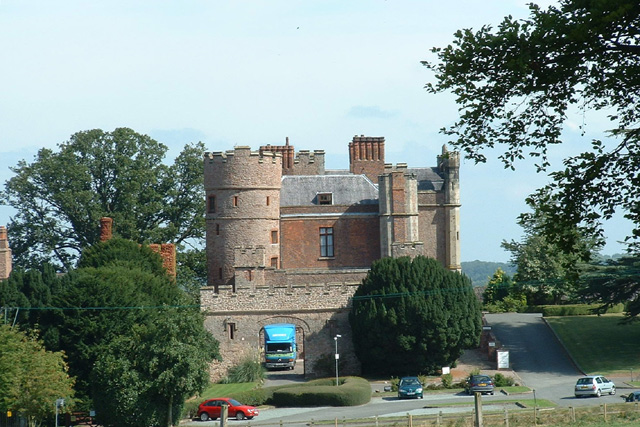
Rowton Castle, near Shrewsbury, Shropshire, seen in 2005. RNC moved to Rowton during the Second World War and was based there until 1978.

In the 20th century, the college moved location several times before establishing itself at its present campus in Hereford. The first of these moves occurred at the beginning of World War II, when the college was evacuated from its London site and moved to a mansion named Great Maytham in Rolvenden in west Kent. However, because of the threat of a German invasion, the authorities soon advised another move, and this time, with 24 hours' notice and the help of the London Society for the Blind, a temporary home was found for RNC in Dorton, near Aylesbury, Buckinghamshire. At the time of the move most of the students were on holiday, although some thirty had remained at the college along with several staff members.

The college did not return to London because the Upper Norwood site – which was being used as a hospital following RNC's move to Kent – was bombed in 1940 during the Blitz, then acquired by the authorities. The college had to close temporarily, until a permanent new home could be found, but in 1941 it purchased new premises at Rowton Castle near Shrewsbury in Shropshire and relocated there. The castle was built in the 17th century and is situated in 17 acres (69,000 m^{2}) of grounds six miles (10 km) west of Shrewsbury. This accommodation had limited space, and throughout its time in Shropshire RNC acquired other premises in and around Shrewsbury. Albrighton Hall, about three miles (5 km) from Shrewsbury, was acquired in 1955 and adapted for residential and training purposes for male students, and Hardy House was obtained as a new residential area for female students in 1958. Plans to enlarge the Rowton site were seriously affected when, in 1953, fire destroyed much of the buildings and 38 pianos and organs. The alarm was raised by one of the students, and everybody present was evacuated to safety. Training was able to continue after Henshaw's Institution for the Blind took students and staff as a temporary measure.

RNC remained in Shropshire for many years until, in 1978, more suitable accommodation was found that would enable RNC to consolidate its teaching and residential accommodation into one campus, and the college moved to its current home in Hereford. The site had previously been the campus of Hereford College of Education, a former teacher training college. In 1978 the college adopted its present name, the Royal National College for the Blind. RNC was opened at its new campus by Prince Charles, who arrived in Hereford by helicopter to perform the ceremony in 1979.

=== Hereford ===
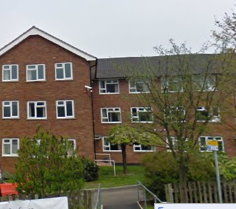
Dowdell Hall was one of the halls of residence at RNC to have its facilities upgraded in the early 2000s.

In the early 2000s the halls of residence at the Hereford campus underwent an extensive £1.5 million upgrade. The blocks were originally built when the campus was being used as a teacher training college during the 1960s and were updated to include modern facilities such as larger student bedrooms with en-suite bathrooms and space for televisions and computers, and improved social areas.

In 2006 the college announced an extensive expansion of its campus, including new halls of residence, a sports and complementary therapy building and a new outdoor floodlit sports pitch. The £21.5m sports development would be the venue for the 2010 World Blind Football Championship. A£10 million fundraising campaign, Building Brighter Futures, was created to raise the funds required to complete the project, and construction work began in the summer of 2007. The complex, thePoint4, was originally named The Point after a nearby block of flats. It includes a bistro and conference facilities, and commenced operation in April 2009, and was officially opened on 24 June by BBC Sport presenter and Daily Mail columnist Des Kelly. In 2008 the college was nominated as one of the sites for the 2012 Paralympic Games and acted as a pre-Games training camp for Paralympic athletes.

RNC was the subject of a 2007 documentary for the Channel Four series Cutting Edge, which followed three young students (Steve Markham, Daniel Angus and Selina Litt) during their first term at the college. The film examines their individual journeys towards greater independence as they encounter the unique challenges that being visually impaired presents, as well as how they deal with the everyday issues that affect all teenagers, such as sex, relationships, partying and their future plans after graduation. The documentary, Blind Young Things, was first aired on 30 April 2007, and won a Royal Television Society award for Channel Four and the Cutting Edge team in 2008.

In September 2009 the college became the permanent home of the National BlindArt Collection, a collection of paintings, sculptures, installations and other works of art designed to engage all the senses and to provide people who are visually impaired with greater accessibility to art. In November 2009 RNC announced that it had been forced to send a third of its students home following an outbreak of swine flu on campus. During the heavy winter snowfall of 2009–2010 the college's sports facilities were utilised by the Hereford United team for training after the bad weather conditions made using their own grounds at Edgar Street difficult.

In January 2010 two students from the college appeared with the fashion consultant Gok Wan in an edition of the Channel 4 series How to Look Good Naked...with a Difference, where they took part in a photo shoot. The series sought to highlight confidence issues among people with disabilities. In February 2010 the college secured a £90,000 grant from the Learning and Skills Improvement Service to install a music video production studio enabling bands to record material and showcase their work.

RNC celebrated its 140th anniversary in March 2012 with a day of events at its campus and a street collection in Hereford.

=== Restructuring ===
In the late 2000s RNC underwent significant restructuring as it responded to changes in the world of employment and therefore the courses that it offered its students. However, some of the college's changes provoked criticism from staff and students who argued these were not in RNC's best interest. There was some controversy over the college's decision to reduce the availability of courses in piano tuning, traditionally regarded as a secure profession for visually impaired people, while fears were expressed that the decrease in A Level subjects would lead to RNC becoming a sport rather than an academic orientated college. Responding to these concerns in July 2008, the then principal Christine Steadman told In Touch, the BBC Radio 4 news programme for visually impaired listeners; "It's about what the local authorities, what the learning and skills council, what the Welsh Assembly for government will purchase from us. And at the moment we are reducing a small number of A Level courses but at the same time we're extending other courses, for example we've got level 3 Braille being taught for the first time at the college, we're not cutting A Levels, we're just responding to the needs of the learners that are coming through our doors." In an interview in January 2010, the then principal Geoff Draper said that piano tuning would be taught at the college if there was a demand for it, and suggested RNC could look to bringing in international students to fill places.

Entrance to thePoint4, RNC's sports and leisure complex, seen in June 2009, shortly after its opening

The changes led to significant department reorganisations within RNC, with several dozen staff members being summarily dismissed without explanation; some were replaced by volunteers. A number of former college employees made complaints regarding the manner in which their employment was ended. In July 2008 the college lecturers union, the University and College Union, called for greater consultation between management and staff at the college. Speaking in a 2009 interview with In Touch Ian Pickford, who was brought in as interim principal following Christine Steadman's departure, claimed that the atmosphere of the college had changed and issued a challenge to any student or member of staff who was still unhappy to meet with him to discuss their concerns.

Financial concerns were raised in 2009 over the cost of the new leisure complex, and because of a change in the source of student funding from the Learning and Skills Council to Local Education Authorities. The college was facing a shortfall of at least £500,000 in 2009 and its auditors expressed doubt about RNC's ability to continue as a going concern. In response Ian Pickford said that much of thePoint4's costs had been paid for through donations and that the shortfall issue was being addressed through cutbacks, including some redundancies. Of the auditors' concerns he said; "I think post the banking crisis a lot of auditors are incredibly nervous about making bland statements in terms of the future of organisations and therefore they frequently now put those sort of caveats in to protect their position going forward."

== Assistive technology ==
The college is actively involved in the development and use of assistive technology to aid visually impaired people in their everyday lives. For example, working with a United States-based software engineer, RNC produced the T3 (Talking Tactile Tablet), a touch sensitive device for interpreting tactile images such as diagrams, charts and maps. The device is connected to a computer and run with a programme CD, and has a tactile surface which produces touchable icons that provide audio feedback when they are pressed. The device was originally developed for educational purposes but can be adapted for other uses. In 2005 Hereford Museum and Art Gallery became the first in the United Kingdom to invest in the technology. The T3 was later marketed internationally with the help of the UK Trade & Investment's passport initiative – a scheme which gives new exporters the training, planning and support they need to succeed in overseas markets.

The Mountbatten, an electronic Braille writing machine and embosser, was pioneered and developed at the college by Ernest Bate. Work began on the project following a bequest in the will of the late Lord Louis Mountbatten for the development of a modern, low cost, portable brailler. It has been available since 1991, and is manufactured by Quantum Technology, a company based in Australia. In the early 1990s two RNC lecturers, Clive Ellis and Tony Larkin, invented the Hoople, a hoop-shaped mobility aid for blind people which performs a similar role to a white cane, but is designed for use in a rural environment and on rough terrain. RNC lecturer Nigel Berry designed the Fingerprints Braille course, which was first published in 1993 and is now widely used to teach adult beginners to touch-read and write grade 2 Braille.

RNC is involved in the RoboBraille project which allows visually impaired Internet users to have text translated into Braille and MP3 audio format via email. The system, developed in Denmark, was launched in June 2006 and won a British Computer Society Social Contribution Project Award in 2007. ClearText, which enables visually impaired users to browse the web more easily by making text easier for them to read, was developed in conjunction with the college. In 2009 RNC lecturer Tony Sales developed Vinux, an accessible version of the Linux operating system for the visually impaired.

== Education ==
RNC provides full-time courses in vocational and academic subjects for approximately 100 students aged 16-25. Students have often been visually impaired since birth or may have lost their sight in later life as a result of illness or accident. Some students have additional disabilities such as autistic spectrum disorder and other medical needs. They can attend the college on a daily or residential basis, and accommodation is provided for those who board.

Courses vary in length from a few weeks to two years. There are no formal academic requirements for entry into RNC, but potential students are invited to attend an assessment at the college before being offered a place to determine the level of support they will need during their studies. The assessment typically includes an evaluation of a person's level of vision, their mobility and independence skills, any residential support they may require, basic literacy and numeracy skills tests, and an interview with the leader of the course they wish to take.

Study programmes at RNC are designed to prepare visually impaired students for progression into further education, university or employment. The development of independent living and personal skills is also encouraged. The college is divided into several different areas of study. These include Leisure, Therapies and Sport (including courses and qualifications in massage, complementary therapies, and sport treatment and management); Music, Media, Performance and Art (including courses and qualifications in music technology, media and art); Information and Communication Technology (including courses and qualifications in office skills and the European Computer Driving Licence); Business, Administration and Customer Service; Secondary level qualifications – General Certificate of Secondary Education (GCSE) and General Certificate of Education Advanced Level (A-Level) qualifications in subjects such as English, mathematics, French and psychology; and Braille reading. On top of academic and vocational study students are also taught to develop independence and mobility skills for day-to-day living. Topics covered here include the use of a white cane and becoming familiar with the surrounding environment, using public transport safely and confidently, cooking and laundry skills, and using cash machines or making chip and PIN credit card transactions.

Traditionally courses in Piano Tuning and Piano Technology were also available at the college. However, these were significantly reduced in the late 2000s because of a decline in the number of students studying the subjects. There has also been a reduction in the number of A-levels available for study owing to changes in the types of courses that education funding bodies supporting students at RNC are willing to pay for.

RNC began to offer its first higher education (or university level) qualification in January 2010 with the launch of the Certificate in Higher Education: Working with People with Visual Impairment Programme. The qualification is offered in collaboration with St Joseph's Centre for the Visually Impaired in Dublin and the University of Worcester.

Following an inspection by Ofsted in 2004 the quality of the college's teaching was graded as "outstanding", and in 2005 RNC was one of only eight colleges in the UK to be awarded Learning and Skills Beacon Status. It is the only college for visually impaired students to have Beacon status, which is only given to educational establishments which have received a first-class Ofsted inspection report. RNC was again praised by Ofsted in 2009 for its continued good progress when Inspectors graded the college as "outstanding" across all six areas inspected and said it had gained ground since its last inspection in 2006.

== Campus ==
Orchard Hall, RNC's new halls of residence, which was built to replace an older building in 2008

RNC has three halls of residence, two of which (Campbell and Dowdell) have been updated in recent years to include modern facilities in accordance with requirements set out in the Care Standards Act 2000 and the Disability Discrimination Act 1995. Specific accommodation has been adapted for wheelchair users, while some rooms have sensory fire alarm calls to alert those who are hard of hearing. Halls are divided into flats accommodating several students. Each flat has a number of single rooms with shared kitchen and dining facilities, and a central lounge.

Because it was not possible to upgrade Gardner Hall, a new modern block, Orchard Hall, was built to replace it. Gardner became an assessment centre for prospective students. In September 2009 Gardner was made available as a venue for hire for functions such as weddings. In addition to the halls of residence, the college also owns several houses both on and off campus which enable students to gain a greater level of independent living. There is a restaurant which provides meals, or students can choose to be self-catering. All accommodation has kitchen facilities.

On-campus facilities include a gym, sports hall, a floodlit all-weather football pitch and tennis courts. RNC's thePoint4 complex offers sporting, leisure and conference facilities, as well as a bistro, and is open to both students and members of the general public. Other facilities at RNC include the Flexible Learning Centre, which features the latest assistive technology and learning resources and is open seven days a week, a student social club which is licensed to sell alcohol to students who are 18 and over, and a student common room. The college has an active Students' Union which plays an important role in college life, being responsible for organising leisure activities both on and off campus. There are also on-campus medical facilities.

In December 2008 the Hereford Times reported that the college would be home to a sculpture by the Herefordshire-based contemporary artist Walenty Pytel that he would create using an original drawing produced by an RNC student. The piece, depicting a man running in a Futurist style and titled the 4Runner was unveiled in September 2009 and stands on a 14 feet (4.3 m) plinth outside the entrance of the sports and leisure complex.

== Extracurricular activities ==
RNC is the home of the first football academy for visually impaired players. The Football Academy was officially opened in August 2008 by former England footballer Sir Trevor Brooking and offers visually impaired students the opportunity to include football as part of their study programme with a view to playing the game at a national level. The college is the home of the England blind football team, which is supported by the Football Association and coached by former professional footballer Tony Larkin. The game is played as a five-a-side match using a ball filled with ballbearings to enable players to hear its position. Teams consist of four blind players and a sighted goalkeeper who offers directions along with the coach and a sighted guide behind the opposition goalpost. RNC is helping to develop a national blind football league. In 2010 RNC hosted the World Blind Football Championship at its campus. The tournament got under way on Saturday 14 August with the opening match between England and Spain, and was won by Brazil following a 2–0 win against Spain in the final on 22 August. Members of England's blind football team travelled to Los Angeles in November 2011 to promote the sport in the United States, and took part in a day's training with former England captain David Beckham. The trip was organised by supermarket chain Sainsbury's as part of their sponsorship deal with the footballer.

Blind cricket, which is played basically the same as conventional cricket but using larger stumps and wickets and a white ball so that players may see it much more easily, is also played at the college, and RNC has its own cricket team, which competes in the British Blind Sport (BBS) National Cricket League. The college also features acoustic shooting, a sport which uses air rifles fitted with photoelectric cells which convert light reflected from targets into sound.

As well as football, cricket and acoustic shooting, students at RNC can participate in a wide range of other sporting and athletic activities, including horse riding, swimming, ten pin bowling, weight training, circuit training and martial arts. Away from sport, other activities include art and design, ceramics, drama and dance, photography and gardening. There are shopping excursions and trips to the cinema and theatre, while clubs and societies include a dining club and the RNC choir.

== Notable people and alumni ==
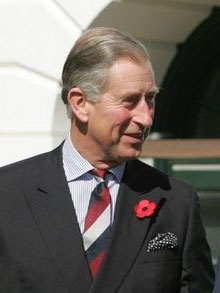
King Charles III has been the college's patron since 1997.

The college is a charitable organisation and is registered with the Charity Commission, the government body which oversees charities in England and Wales. It has a number of high-profile supporters which include King Charles III, who is the current Patron, a position he has held since 1997. The current president is Mrs Jessica White, and there are several public figures who serve as vice presidents. These include the Archbishop of Canterbury, the Archbishop of York, the Archbishop of Westminster, Countess Mountbatten of Burma and Michael Buerk. In 2008 the BBC sports presenter Gabby Logan and Daily Mail columnist Des Kelly both became Patrons of the England Blind Football team.

Since the Principalship passed outside the Campbell family in 1934 a number of individuals have held the position. Among them are Lance Marshall who was principal at the time the college moved to its Hereford campus in 1978, followed by Colin Housby-Smith and then Roisin Burge. Christine Steadman oversaw the college's restructuring during her tenure in the late 2000s and proved to be unpopular with staff and students; Steadman resigned in November 2008. Geoff Draper, a former Colonel in the British Army, was appointed to the position on 7 December 2009. Sheila Tallon succeeded Draper in September 2011. Mark Fisher took over from Tallon after her retirement in December 2015.

Graduates of the college include David Blunkett, British Labour Party politician and former Home Secretary, and Alfred Hollins, English composer and organist. Giles McKinley, who starred in a groundbreaking television commercial for Sauza Tequila during the 1990s, is a former RNC student. The actor Ryan Kelly, who in 1997, became the first completely blind student to join the Bristol Old Vic Theatre School, and plays the role of Jack "Jazzer" McCreary in Radio 4's The Archers, attended RNC. The Paralympic cyclist Anthony Kappes also studied at the college. The Hereford born studio potter Simon Carroll taught at the RNC in the early 1990s. Carroll has permanent collections at the V&A museum London and Amgueddfa Cymru.

== Financial crisis ==
The Royal National College for the Blind says that without extra funding it will be unsustainable. Lucy Proctor of the college's charitable trust, maintains this is due to tightening of special-needs budgets. Spending is £2.7m higher than income and the income of the college is smaller in cash terms than six years ago. The college needs local authorities to pay for residential places, sometimes costing over £50,000 annually. Proctor said, "It is difficult for the local authorities, because there isn't enough money in the system. They've been subject to cuts in every area. We're a national provision, but we're being funded locally. This means legal wrangles about getting councils to support places – and there are students who should already have started this term who are still at home arguing about funding. [This was in October 2019.] Increasing student numbers is critical – and if student numbers don't go up we won't be financially sustainable." Proctor stated further every year some young people get places at the Royal National College but fail to follow through with them, frequently due to insufficient funding and since their families are, "tired of fighting and can't face another battle".

== Bibliography ==
- Annual Report. Royal National College for the Blind. 2006–2007.
- Annual Report (PDF). Royal National College for the Blind. 2008–2009. Archived (PDF) from the original on 3 March 2016.
- Commission for Social Care Inspection (28 November 2006). 2006 inspection report. HM Government of the United Kingdom. Archived from the original on 20 September 2018.
- Illingworth, W. H. (1910). History of the education of the blind. S. Low, Marston & Company, Ltd.
