= Hereford College of Arts =

Art school in Hereford, England

Coordinates: 52.061°N 2.697°W

- Established: 1851; 175 years ago
- Affiliations: University of Wales Trinity Saint David
- Principal: Abigail Appleton
- Location: Hereford, Herefordshire, England, United Kingdom
- Colours: HCA Blue
- Website: https://www.hca.ac.uk/

Hereford College of Arts (HCA) is an art school based in Herefordshire, United Kingdom.

== Description ==
It offers courses in both further and higher education fields, in Art & Design, Music and Performing Arts, to national and international students. The college has two campuses: Folly Lane is home to College-level courses, and the former Royal National College for the Blind building on College Road is home to University-level courses. The BA (Hons) Artist Blacksmithing Course is taught at The National School of Blacksmithing located in Holme Lacy on the outskirts of Hereford. Music and Performing Arts students stage productions based at the college and at external venues. Students attend specialist shows and conferences.

== Courses ==
The college's post-16 further education courses include Diploma in Art & Design, Diploma/Extended Diploma in Art & Design, Diploma/Extended Diploma in Music, Diploma/Extended Diploma in Performing Arts. The college added a new Digital Media Level 3 Diploma/Extended Diploma to its line up in 2020. The college also runs a Level 3 Foundation Diploma in Art & Design aimed at post-18 year olds. Most of HCA's post-16 courses are based at its Folly Lane campus. As of 2026, the college now also offers a Level 3 Fashion, Business and Retail Course.

The college offers a variety of Higher Education degree-level courses at its College Road Campus in Hereford, which are validated by The University of Wales Trinity Saint David. College Level Courses include BA (Hons) Artist Blacksmithing, BA (Hons) Contemporary Design Crafts, BA (Hons) Fine Art, BA (Hons) Graphic & Media Design, BA (Hons) Illustration, BA (Hons) Illustration & Animation, BA (Hons) Jewellery Design, BA (Hons) Popular Music, BA (Hons) Photography, BA (Hons) Performing Arts, BA (Hons) Textile Design.

In September 2024 Hereford College of Arts added two new digital media focused degrees to its offerings; BA (Hons) Games Design and BA (Hons) Digital Content Creation. A new digital media site was constructed at its College Road Campus to facilitate these courses.

The college also offers postgraduate courses including MA Fine Art, MA Curating, MA Contemporary Crafts, MA Photography and MA Forged Metal Arts is to launch in September 2025 to complement its popular BA (Hons) Artist Blacksmithing degree.

== History ==
The college was founded shortly after The Great Exhibition in 1851 prompted the UK Government to set up The Department of Practical Art. It was requested to set up an Elementary School of Art on 4 December 1852, when it had "conformed to all the regulations and [was] waiting for the appointment of masters". Records suggest the school opened in 1853, when it was hailed as a self-sustaining success by South Kensington. The Hereford School of Art and Science register from 1885 shows students from a wide range of backgrounds and industries enrolled in various courses of study. The School of Art and Science continued until 1903, when it moved to LEA control.

Following the post-shakeup of technical and vocational education in 1944, the Art and Science school at Hereford became known as the Hereford School of Art before becoming the Herefordshire College of Art & Design. The name changed to incorporate the inclusion of Music and Performing Arts. In 2012, a new Arts Space and main entrance for Folly Lane were unveiled, providing a café and exhibition space. Designed by Hewitt Studios and constructed by Keir Moss, the space was funded entirely from college reserves. Landscaped gardens and outdoor areas are integrated into the design. This space has hosted a number of exhibitions and events.

The design has been shortlisted and awarded for:

- 2014 Green Apple Award
- 2013 Civic Trust Award
- 2012 West Midlands RIBA Award
- 2012 West of England LABC Building Excellence Award
- 2012 Wood Award

It has also been profiled by MADE to showcase how design is improving the quality of the built environment in the West Midlands and has been featured in a cross-section of architectural journals and magazines from the UK and abroad.

In June 2013, HCA acquired the former Royal National College building on College Road. This building provides studio and workshop spaces and places degree students closer to the main campus on Folly Lane. During summer 2013, HCA refurbished and adapted the spaces into studios, workshops, an on-site library, photographic studios and stores, darkrooms and IT facilities, including a large digital Mac and printing suite.

== Notable students ==
- Olly Alexander – actor and lead singer of synth-pop trio Years & Years
- Rose Ellen Dix – YouTuber
- James Price - Oscar winning set designer for the film Poor Things
- Sara Radstone – ceramic artist
- Simon Carroll – studio potter

== See also ==
- Hereford College of Education
