= List of museums in Herefordshire =

This list of museums in Herefordshire, England contains museums which are defined for this context as institutions (including nonprofit organizations, government entities, and private businesses) that collect and care for objects of cultural, artistic, scientific, or historical interest and make their collections or related exhibits available for public viewing. Also included are non-profit art galleries and university art galleries. Museums that exist only in cyberspace (i.e., virtual museums) are not included.

Name	Image	Town/City	Type	Summary
Berrington Hall		Leominster	Historic house	Operated by the National Trust, late 18th-century country house with period furniture, below stairs rooms, grounds, gardens
Brockhampton Estate		Bromyard	Historic house	Operated by the National Trust, medieval manor house, woods, parkland
Bromyard & District Local History Centre		Bromyard	Local	local history
Butchers Row House Museum		Ledbury	Local	Victorian life and local history
Courtyard, Hereford		Hereford	Art	Arts centre with theatres and an art gallery
Croft Castle		Yarpole	Historic house	Operated by the National Trust, stone manor house dating back to the 11th century, Georgian interiors, woodland trails, walled garden
Eardisland Dovecote		Eardisland	Local	information
Eastnor Castle		Ledbury	Historic house	19th century mock castle with fine art and furnishings, gardens, maze, woodland trails
Goodrich Castle		Goodrich	Historic house	Visitor center with exhibits and audio tours of the ruinous Norman medieval castle
Hampton Court, Herefordshire		Hope under Dinmore	Historic house	Castle country house and gardens
Hellens		Much Marcle	Historic house	Tudor style house
Hereford Museum and Art Gallery		Hereford	Multiple	Local history, art, decorative arts
Hereford Society of Model Engineers		Hereford	Railroad	model train layouts
Herefordshire Light Infantry Museum		Hereford	Military	Open by appointment, artifacts and history of the Herefordshire Light Infantry
Kington Museum		Kington	Local	local history
Ledbury Heritage Centre		Ledbury	Local	Local history
Leominster Museum		Leominster	Local	Local history
Mappa Mundi & Chained Library		Hereford	History	Medieval map of the world and Hereford Cathedral Library, located at Hereford Cathedral
Market House Heritage Centre		Ross-on-Wye	Local	local history
Mortimer's Cross Water Mill		Leominster	Mill	Restored water mill
Museum of Cider		Hereford	Food	former cider making factory, equipment and history of cider making
Old House, Hereford		Hereford	Historic house	17th century Jacobean period house
St John Medieval Museum & Coningsby Hospital		Hereford	Religious	Site of the Blackfriars Monastery, which was a Dominican monastery home of crusaders of the Order of St. John and an ex-serviceman's hospital
Time Machine Museum		Bromyard	Media	exhibition of Doctor Who series props, monsters and costumes, also from Star Wars, puppets from Gerry Anderson television shows including Thunderbirds, Stingray and Captain Scarlet, teddy bears
Violette Szabo Museum		Wormelow Tump	Biographical	life of World War II secret agent Violette Szabo
Waterworks Museum		Hereford	Industry	Victorian water pumping station with steam engines, history of drinking water
Weobley Museum		Weobley	Local	local history
Wilton Castle		Ross-on-Wye	Historic house	12th-century Norman castle fortification mostly in ruins, partially restored, gardens

== Defunct museums ==
- Churchill House Museum, Hereford

== See also ==
- Category:Tourist attractions in Herefordshire
