= Guilly d'Herbemont =

French advocate for the blind (1888–1980)

Guilly d'Herbemont (left) distributing the first white cane at a ceremony in 1931

Guilly d'Herbemont (25 June 1888 – 28 February 1980) was a French writer and advocate for the blind who popularized the use of white canes. Seeing blind people struggling to cross roads, she proposed distributing white canes for the blind so they could be easily identified. The police and the local government supported her efforts, and she handed out the first white cane in a ceremony on 7 February 1931. Professionally, she was a writer who produced books and poetry. Her books are Fleurs des Alyscamps (Flowers of the Alyscamps) (1911), Le jardin de ta joie (The Garden of Your Joy) (1928), and Le Désir de vivre (The Desire to Live) (1932).

== Early life ==
Guillelmine d'Herbemont was born to d'Alphonse Charles André Ferry, Count of Herbemont, and Marie Renée Louise Victoria Allard, Countess of Herbemont, in Mouzay, Meuse in northeastern France on 25 June 1888. Her family home was the Château de Charmois, though she traveled between Paris and Belgium throughout her childhood. She was educated by governesses and nuns. In early adulthood, d'Herbemont fell ill and spent time at a hospital in Lausanne, Switzerland.

== White canes ==
=== Proposal ===
In 1930, D'Herbemont lived near a home for the blind on de Courcelles in Paris. It was not always obvious to the public when someone was blind, and automobile traffic made the roads dangerous for members of the blind population to cross. After seeing a blind person nearly struck by a car, d'Herbemont proposed that the blind carry white canes so they can be more easily identified, inspired by the ones used by Paris police officers. She wrote a letter to the editor to L'Écho de Paris, which the paper published on November 30, 1930. The day after d'Herbemont submitted the letter, the paper's editor contacted her to express support for the idea and arranged a meeting between d'Herbemont and law enforcement to discuss implementation. A day later, Prefecture of Police Jean Chiappe and Paris Police Director Xavier Guichard organized an assembly for the leadership of associations for the blind so d'Herbemont could present her idea.

Among the blind community's leadership, there was disagreement on how to best implement d'Herbemont's white canes. Some initially questioned her approach fearing there would be a stigma associated with the canes. Others disliked that the canes were white and felt they should be red. At the meeting, it was decided that men's canes would have a curved top while women's would have a straight leather-strapped top, women's canes would be lighter, all the canes would have the Paris coat of arms, and the canes would not be used until a ceremony took place to distribute the first. Before the plan was carried out, a vote was scheduled among two organizations for the blind at the Quinze Vingt Home for the Blind and the Brothers of St. John church on adoption of the canes. The vote was held days later and overwhelmingly approved by both.

D'Herbemont also received some pushback from the local government which felt a woman of high social class should not involve herself in public affairs. The distribution of white canes was ultimately approved by the city council. D'Herbemont volunteered to privately fund the white cane project herself, though the Phare de France periodical also offered to cover some of the costs. To find a manufacturer willing to create thousands of canes in such a short time, she suggested that the canes were likely to be adopted in other cities and generate further business to the manufacturer. Reportedly, D'Herbemont had two chestnut trees in her family's estate chopped down so canes could be constructed from their wood.

=== Distribution and spread ===
D'Herbemont bestowed the first two white canes in a ceremony at the Cercle de l'Union interalliée on 7 February 1931. The ceremony was organized by the editor of L'Écho de Paris, and its attendance included local and national government officials. The first cane was given to an elderly merchant woman. The ceremony was followed by the distribution of 5,000 white canes, most of them going to veterans blinded in World War I.

The use of these canes spread to other nations in Europe and to the United States over the next few years. D'Herbemont organized a meeting of about 3,000 blind people at the Salle Pleyel on 11 June 1933. In 1938, she returned to Lausanne—where she had been treated for illness years before—to speak to a crowd of about 100 to 200 blind people. Over time, the white canes went beyond their original purpose of identifying blind individuals and came to be used by blind people to detect obstacles. The original invention of the white cane is attributed to others, including José Mario Fallótico of Argentina and James Biggs of England. Besides the white canes, d'Herbemont advocated other safety measures like establishing speed limits and increasing the number of pedestrian crosswalks.

== Literary career ==
D'Herbemont was a writer. In 1930, she won the grand prize at the French Floral Games for her poem "Les Peupliers" ["The Poplars"]..

The Bibliothèque nationale de France identifies three works that D'Herbemont wrote:

- Fleurs des Alyscamps (Flowers of the Alyscamps) (1911)
- Le jardin de ta joie (The Garden of Your Joy) (1928)
- Le Désir de vivre (The Desire to Live) (1932)

== Honors and death ==
D'Herbemont was awarded the Legion of Honour on 20 November 1947. She later received the award for a second time, from President René Coty. D'Herbemont died in a Swiss hospital in Issy-les-Moulineaux, France, on 28 February 1980. She was buried in a family tomb in Mouzay, Meuse.

== Works cited ==
- "De Witte Stok Voor Blinden" [The White Cane for the Blind]. De Blindenbode van Licht en Liefde (in Dutch). No. 1. 1952. pp. 26–28.
- Ciccone, Louis (1998). "Three French People Celebrated in Contemporary History of the Blind". In Desormeaux, Jean (ed.). Second International Conference on the Blind in History and the History of the Blind. pp. 66–75.
- Garbat, Marcin (2013). "Wsparcie osób z niepełnosprawnością wzroku – krótka historia szkolenia psów przewodnikówi posługiwania się białą laską" [Support for people with visual disabilities – a short history of guide dog training and using a white cane] (PDF). Niepełnosprawność – zagadnienia, problemy, rozwiązania (in Polish). 3 (8): 81–107.
