= Talking tactile tablet =

A talking tactile tablet or T3 is a graphic tablet with a touch surface that can be used as an input device that uses swell paper to create 3D overlays and connects audio files to parts of the overlays. The device is connected to a computer and run with a programme CD, and has a tactile surface which produces touchable icons that provide audio feedback when they are pressed. It can be used to help visually impaired users to interpret diagrams, charts and maps by producing a tactile, touchable image, and audio feedback.

The T3 was developed at the United Kingdom's Royal National College for the Blind in Hereford in conjunction with a software company based in the United States. The device was originally developed for educational purposes but is adaptable for other uses. In 2005, Hereford Museum and Art Gallery became the first in the United Kingdom to invest in the technology. The T3 was later sold on the international marketplace with the help of the UK Trade & Investment's passport initiative – a scheme which gives new exporters the training, planning and support they need to succeed in overseas markets.
