= Hereford Museum and Art Gallery =

Museum and art gallery in Hereford, Herefordshire, England

Coordinates: 52.0548°N 2.7175°W

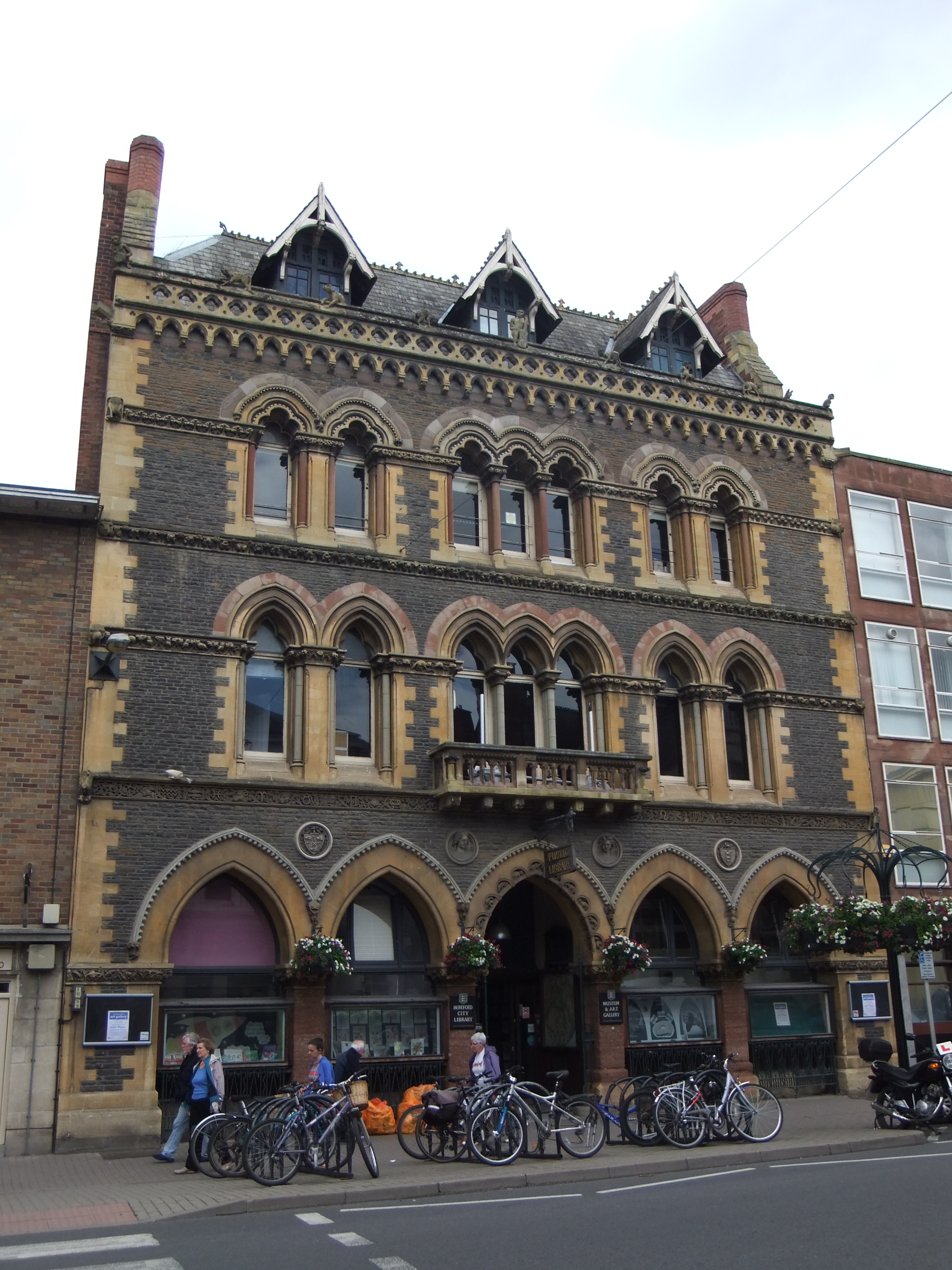

- Location in Herefordshire
- Established: 1874
- Location: Broad Street, Hereford, Herefordshire, England HR4 9AU
- Type: Regional museum, art gallery, history museum, decorative arts museum, natural history museum, local museum, archaeological museum
- Public transit access: www.herefordshire.gov.uk/history-lives/hereford-museums-art-gallery/2
- Website: www.herefordshire.gov.uk/history-lives/hereford-museums-art-gallery/2

The Hereford Museum and Art Gallery is a museum and art gallery located in the cathedral city of Hereford, Herefordshire, England.

Opened in 1874, through the generosity of Sir James Rankin MP, President of the Woolhope Naturalists' Field Club. The museum and art gallery had around 1,000 objects on permanent display. The displays cover local history, natural sciences and fine and decorative arts. The museum is part of Herefordshire Council's Museum Service.

The museum and art gallery is currently closed for a major redevelopment.

== History of the museum ==
The museum and art gallery's history is closely linked with the Woolhope Naturalists' Field Club. The Woolhope Club was founded in 1851 "for the practical study, in all its branches, of the Natural History of Herefordshire and the districts immediately adjacent". The club took its name from the Woolhope Dome, an outcrop of Silurian rocks around the village of Woolhope to the south-east of Hereford.

The Woolhope club was founded in 1851 at a meeting of the Literary, Philosophical and Natural History Institution of Hereford. In 1869 the club's president, Sir James Rankin MP, offered money for the building of a library and museum during his presidential retirement speech of 22 February 1870. At the meeting of the club's Museum Committee on 23 February 1870 a recommendation to build a museum with the addition of a public library was passed.

On 2 May 1871, a joint Woolhope Club/Town Council committee convened "to consider the offer of J Rankin, Esq., to purchase a site and erect suitable buildings for a Free Library and Museum in the City of Hereford in connexion [sic] with the Woolhope Naturalists’ Field club." The resolution was passed and Rankin provided the capital needed to purchase a strip of land on Broad Street in the centre of the city for £1,750 from Mr William Beavon of The Villa, Whitecross Road.

The foundation stone was laid in March 1873 and the building opened on 8 October 1874.

== Building ==
The Hereford Times described the Library and Museum building as "truly an ornament of the city" The building was designed by local architect Frederick Roberston Kempson, FRIBA.

His design was heavily influenced by Venetian Gothic revival style. Its distinctive façade features intricate carvings of animals, plants and signs of the zodiac. The building cost £7,600, of which James Rankin gave £6,115 and the City Council raised the rest.

On the ground floor two rooms faces onto Broad Street, although intended to be reading and committee rooms they had to be let as shops to raise funds for museum display cases. While at the rear was the large, double height lending library. On the second floor was the museum and Woolhope Club Room. The third and fourth floors where the librarian/curators accommodation, which included a kitchen, scullery, sitting rooms and bedrooms.

A bequest by Sir Joseph Pulley MP and a further gift from his nephew, Sir Charles Pulley MP enabled the City Council to extend the building back towards Aubrey Street. The extension was opened on 12 April 1912; it included a new lending and reference library on the ground floor and an art gallery on the second floor. The museum was connected to the new art gallery through a fine oak doors. The first exhibition in April 1912 featured selection of local art work loaned from private collections.

The building had its first update in 1900 when electric lighting was installed to replace the use of gas throughout the building. In 1963 a mezzanine floor was added above the lending library and reading corridor. The new mezzanine doubled the size of the library. The building received a Grade II listing on 22 October 1973. The building closed temporarily for Asbestos removal in September 2015 before reopening in July 2017. Due to structural issues and fire regulations only ten people were allowed into the museum and art gallery at anyone time from 2020 after the COVID-19 lockdowns. The building closed temporarily to the public on 18 July 2023 for a full redevelopment.

== Early displays ==
The museum was unfurnished on opening in 1874. Display cases had not been costed into the development. The funds for display cases was raised by renting out rooms on the ground floor. By 1875 enough money had been raised to have display cases made.

Woolhope Club members were encouraged to donate artefacts to the museum. Alongside the Woolhope Club, members of other local natural history, literary, philosophical and antiquarian societies generously donated to the museum. Their donations are the foundation of Herefordshire Museum Service's collections. In 1927 a public appeal raised funding to mount two Roman floor mosaics from Kenchester in the stair hall of the building. The collections expanded under the guidance of the museum's curators, notable among them Mr. F.C. Morgan.

== Recent displays ==
The museum displays were left largely unchanged from 1960 until the turn of the century in expectation the building would be refurbished and new home found for the library.

New hands-on displays were designed jointly with the Royal National College for the Blind. In 2005, the museum became the first in the United Kingdom to invest in the Talking Tactile Tablet (T3), developed at the Royal National College for the Blind together with a software company based in the USA.

Throughout the next 20 years the displays were changed and refreshed. On closing for refurbishment in 2023 exhibits in the museum included a two-headed calf, a two-metre long fish, various swords, elements of costume and textiles, as well as objects of historic, social and scientific interest dating back from the pre-historic era up to the 20th century. During summer months it was also home to a bee colony. An area of the art gallery was set aside for the permanent display of works by Brian Hatton, as some of his materials and selected letters.

== Exhibitions ==
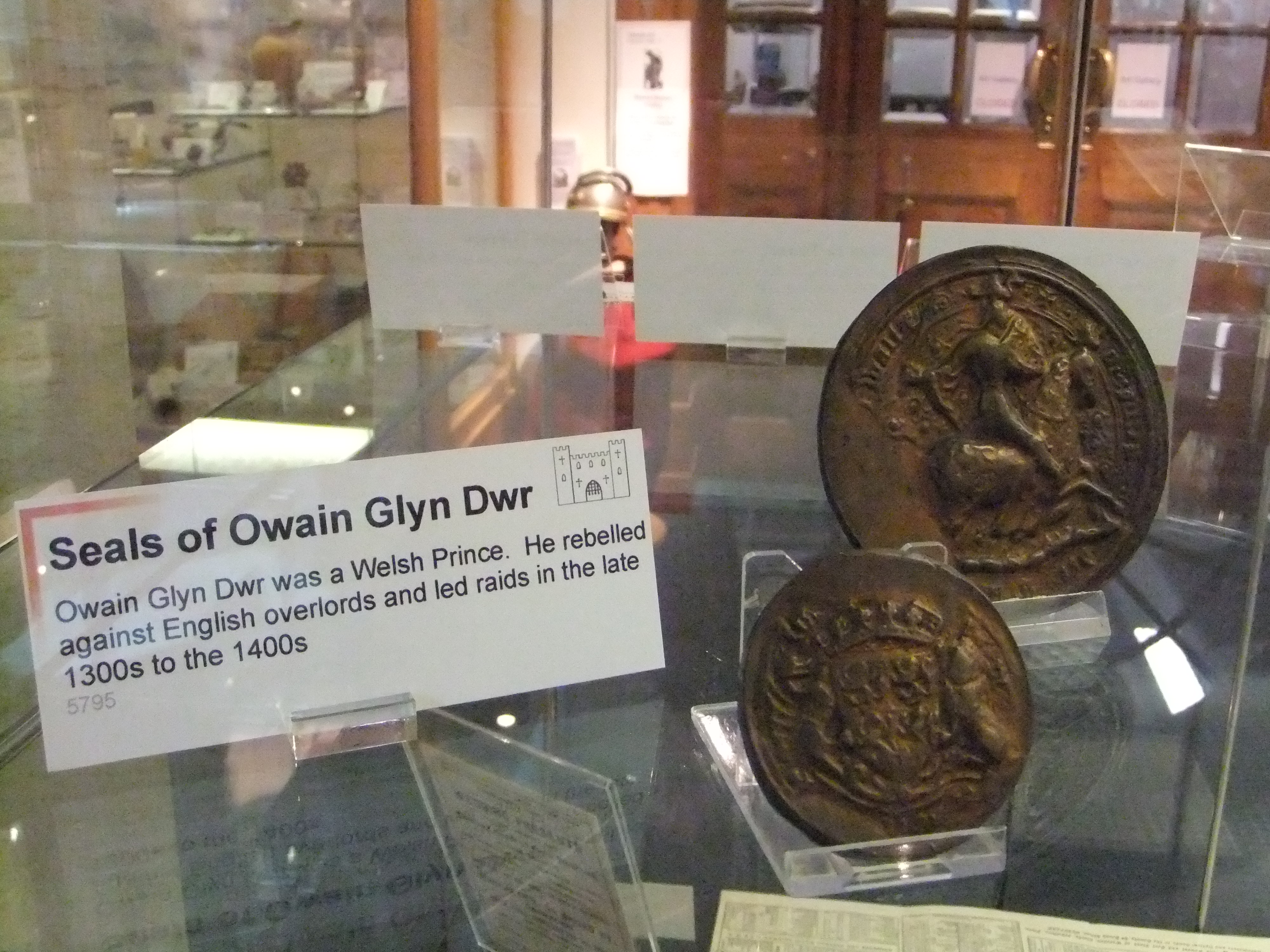
Seals of Owain Glyndŵr on display in the museum

A regular programme of temporary exhibitions of craftwork, paintings, photography, and prints was shown in the art gallery.

In 2006, the bicentennial of Joseph Murray Ince was celebrated with an exhibition.

The designs of Christopher Dresser were exhibited in 2007.

From August to October 2020, The Ice Age in Herefordshire explored local landscapes and environments through National Lottery funding in partnership with Herefordshire Wildlife Trust. The centrepiece of the exhibition was a life sized Woolly Mammoth replica.

The art gallery hosted Grayson Perry's exhibition, The Vanity of Small Differences, from October to December 2021. The exhibition featured six tapestries inspired by William Hogarth's A Rake's Progress, told the story of class mobility and the influence social class has on aesthetic taste.

== Redevelopment ==
In July 2023 the National Lottery Heritage Fund announced a £5m award towards the redevelopment of the building alongside £8m from Herefordshire Council and £5m from the Stronger Towns Fund.

Plans include the introduction of new galleries and display areas; a temporary exhibition space; the restoration of the Woolhope Club Room; and new commercial areas, including a rooftop café. A new floor featuring a viewing beacon and roof terrace, providing 360-degree views over the city and surrounding Herefordshire landscape has been included in the plans.

== See also ==
- List of museums in Herefordshire
