= Cutting Edge (TV series) =

- Cutting Edge logo
- Genre: Documentary
- Narrated by: Various
- Composer: Matthew Cracknell
- Country of origin: United Kingdom
- Original language: English

Production
- Producer: Various
- Running time: 49 minutes

Original release
- Network: Channel 4
- Release: 19 February 1990 – 26 October 2017

Cutting Edge is a British TV documentary series broadcast by Channel 4. It had been Channel 4's flagship documentary series between 19 February 1990 and 26 October 2017 that focused on political and social issues.

== Episodes ==
There have been numerous episodes from 19 February 1990 to 26 October 2017 and some of the highlights include:

=== "Shops and Robbers" ===
Original airdate: 1994

Received some of Channel 4's highest ratings.

=== "Graham Taylor: An Impossible Job" ===
Original airdate: 24 January 1994

About England national football team's unsuccessful attempt to qualify for the 1994 World Cup. Manager Graham Taylor was harshly criticised by the tabloid press during these two years (1992–93), and the fly-on-the-wall documentary revealed a stressed team camp. It also gave birth to Taylor's catchphrase, "Do I not like that" (a statement rather than a question), and Phil Neal's touchline comment "Can we not knock it, boss?"

=== "Brian's Story" ===
Original airdate: 8 May 2001

Documentary on Brian Davis, a former advertising journalist and published author, worked for Campaign as an editor before walking out of the job in which he suffered from manic depression. He is now homeless, penniless and an alcoholic living on the streets in London trying to turn his life around.

=== "Anti-Social Old Buggers" ===
Original airdate: 22 June 2005

Run of episodes in 2005, about "Anti-Social Old Buggers", which included elderly recipients of Asbos, "The Black Widow", "Gridlock" and "The House Clearers".

=== "The Black Widow" ===
Original airdate: 29 June 2005

Documentary on Dena Thompson, a woman who murdered her second husband but who was also found to have had a 20-year career of fraud, deception and bigamy. She was acquitted of murdering her third husband. 4.5 million people watched the documentary, a 22% share of that evening's TV audience.

=== "Blind Young Things" ===
Original airdate: 30 April 2007

A 2007 documentary following students at the Royal National College for the Blind in Hereford. The film won a Royal Television Society award for Channel Four and the Cutting Edge team in 2008.

=== "A Boy Called Alex" ===
Original airdate: 24 January 2008

This documentary follows 16-year-old cystic fibrosis sufferer Alex Stobbs as he attempts to conduct Bach's Magnificat at Eton College. This was followed by a second documentary in October 2009 called "Alex: A Passion for Life", which examines Alex's life as a music student at King's College, Cambridge.

=== "The Human Spider" ===
Original airdate: 15 April 2008

Cutting Edge covered Alain Robert, climber, on some free climbs around the globe.

=== Madeleine Was Here ===
Original airdate: 7 May 2009

Aired two years after the disappearance of missing child Madeleine McCann.

=== "Captive for 18 Years: The Jaycee Lee Story" ===
Original airdate: 1 October 2009

About the kidnapping of Jaycee Lee Dugard with interviews with people close to Jaycee when she was young, including family members, classmates and her headmistress.

=== "Katie: My Beautiful Face" ===
Original airdate: 29 October 2009

Followed the recovery of former model Katie Piper from a brutal acid attack, and which with 3.3 million viewers was the most-watched edition of the Cutting Edge strand in 2009; Piper's case has been subject to a large international response, and following the success of the original documentary Piper was invited to give Channel 4's Alternative Christmas Message for 2009.

The documentary was nominated for "Best Single Documentary" at the BAFTA Television Awards in June 2010, but did not win - the trophy was awarded to BBC One's Wounded. The previous month, director Jessie Versluys had won the Breakthrough Talent prize at the 2010 Craft BAFTA ceremony, for her credits including Katie: My Beautiful Face and The Hospital.

=== "Octomom: Me and My 14 Kids" ===
Original airdate: 12 November 2009

Follows single unemployed mother Nadya Suleman from California, who in January 2009 gave birth to eight children.

=== "The Men Who Jump Off Buildings" ===
Original airdate: 28 July 2010

About Dan Witchalls and Ian Richardson, who participate in the adrenaline sport base jumping.

=== "My Big Fat Gypsy Wedding" ===
Original airdate: 18 February 2010

Follows four Gypsy and Traveller brides as they plan their wedding day. Screened in February 2010, drew 4.5 million viewers and was subsequently commissioned for a spinoff series called Big Fat Gypsy Weddings. This proved to be successful, with the second episode getting 7.4m viewers at its peak.

Production company(s): Firecracker Films

=== "Raoul Moat: Inside the Mind of a Killer" ===
Original airdate: 18 August 2010

Looks at the 2010 Northumbria Police manhunt and the following investigation.

=== "My New Brain" ===
Original airdate: 25 August 2010

Follows 20-year-old Simon Hales as he recovers from a traumatic brain injury.

=== "Ian Brady: Endgames of a Psychopath" ===
Original airdate: 20 August 2012

N/A

=== "The Fried Chicken Shop: Life in a Day" ===
Original airdate: 19 February 2013

N/A

Production company(s): Mentorn
