= Brian Hatton =

English painter

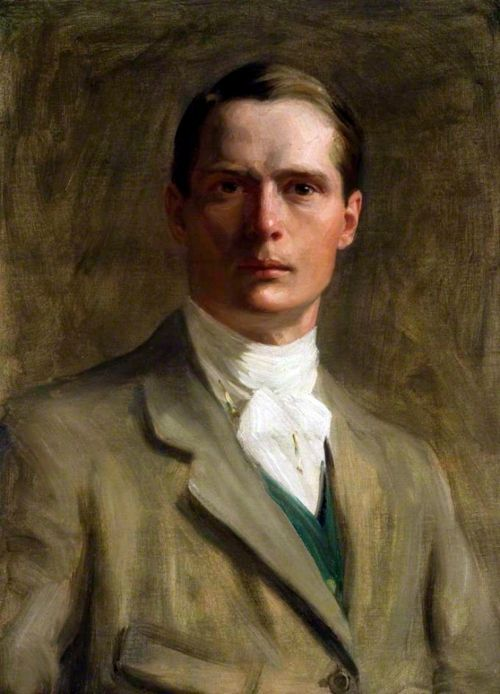
Brian Hatton 1908

Brian Hatton (12 August 1887 – 23 April 1916) was a British artist. He was born in Broomy Hill, Herefordshire, and killed in action during the First World War. His works showed considerable promise and include local landscapes, family portraits, figure studies and book illustrations. A major exhibition of his work was displayed at the Hereford Museum and Art Gallery between November 2007 and January 2008.
