= Herefordshire and Ludlow College =

Herefordshire College

Location
- Folly Lane; Hereford, Herefordshire; England; 52.0619°N 2.69816°W

Information
- School type: Young People's Learning Agency, Skills Funding Agency, Higher Education Funding Council, Student Fees etc., General Further education
- Denomination: Non-denominational
- Ofsted: Reports
- Chairperson: Igor Andronov (Chair of governors)
- Principal: David Williams
- Staff: 450
- Gender: Mixed
- Age: 16+
- Enrollment: 1500 full-time 16- to 18-year-old students and 5,000 adults, mainly part-time
- Campus: Hereford campus, Holme Lacy campus, Ludlow campus, Oswestry Campus and Walford Campus
- Slogan: "Success for our students"
- Website: www.hct.ac.uk

Herefordshire College is a college of further education (FE) based in Hereford, Herefordshire, and with a separate sixth form college campus in Ludlow, Shropshire.

The majority of students, mainly adults, follow courses in health, public services and care, preparation for life and work, and business administration. Of around 8,000 full-time and part-time students, approximately 1,150 learners are aged 16 to 18. The college has recently had a £32M new campus development.

In 2007 the college which was at the time called Herefordshire College of Technology, merged with Holme Lacy College situated 5 miles outside the city. The 257 hectare Holme Lacy campus is dedicated to agriculture and horticulture, and comprises a mixed organic farm, which has its own pedigree herd of Hereford cattle, and includes a Centre for Rural Crafts with courses for blacksmiths and farriers provided by the National School of Blacksmithing, a working commercial farm, a sports academy, an equestrian centre, an animal care centre, a timber yard, specialist workshops, and an IT suite. The campus was part of the former Pershore Group of Colleges based in Pershore, Worcestershire, that was split in 2007, with the Pershore facility being merged with Warwickshire College.

The college is funded by the Learning and Skills Council, the Government Office for the West Midlands, Advantage West Midlands, and Herefordshire Council for their support and development funding. A July 2006 Ofsted report assessed the overall effectiveness of the school with a Grade 2 (good).

In 2013 Herefordshire College of Technology merged with Ludlow College to become Herefordshire and Ludlow College. It now also forms part of the Herefordshire, Ludlow and North Shropshire College (HLNSC), though retains its identity and campus in the heart of the market town of Ludlow, Shropshire.

In November 2018, the college group merged once again with North Shropshire College to form Herefordshire, Ludlow & North Shropshire College. Each campus retains its individual branding and identity.
