= Hereford College of Education =

Teacher training college in Hereford, England

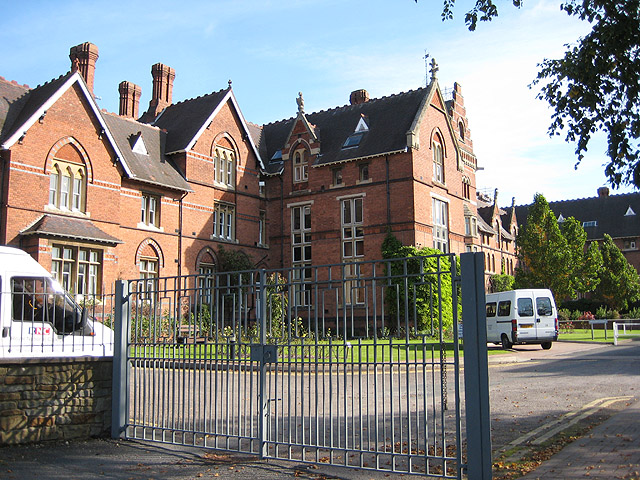
- View of the entrance to the college as seen in 2008. The former Hereford College of Education's campus is now home to the Royal National College for the Blind.
- Type: Teacher training college
- Active: 1902–1977
- Students: 670
- Location: Hereford, United Kingdom

Hereford College of Education was a teacher training college in the English city of Hereford. The college was established in 1902 and was the only higher education institution in the county of Herefordshire throughout its existence. It provided training for teachers – initially two-year courses leading to the Certificate in Education and later three-year courses. For much of its existence it was an all-female college. The college, which was a constituent college of the University of Birmingham, operated for many years before closing in 1978 after cost-cutting measures by the Government of the time which included a reduction in the number of teacher training programmes. The Government was also keen to restructure the way the subject was studied, encouraging universities to offer teacher training rather than specialist colleges.

At the time of its closure the college was the oldest local education authority teacher training college in the United Kingdom. The campus, located in College Road, was taken over by the Royal National College for the Blind in late 1978, before becoming the degree level campus for Hereford College of Arts in 2013.

Cornish writer D. M. Thomas was an English lecturer at Hereford College of Education from 1963 until he was made redundant upon its closure in 1978.

== Gallery ==
Halls of residence now known as Armitage Hall as seen in 2009. The building was originally built in the 1960s.

Halls of residence now known as Campbell Hall as seen in 2009. The building was originally built in the 1960s.

== See also ==
- Bedford College of Higher Education
