= Assistive cane =

Walking stick used as a mobility aid

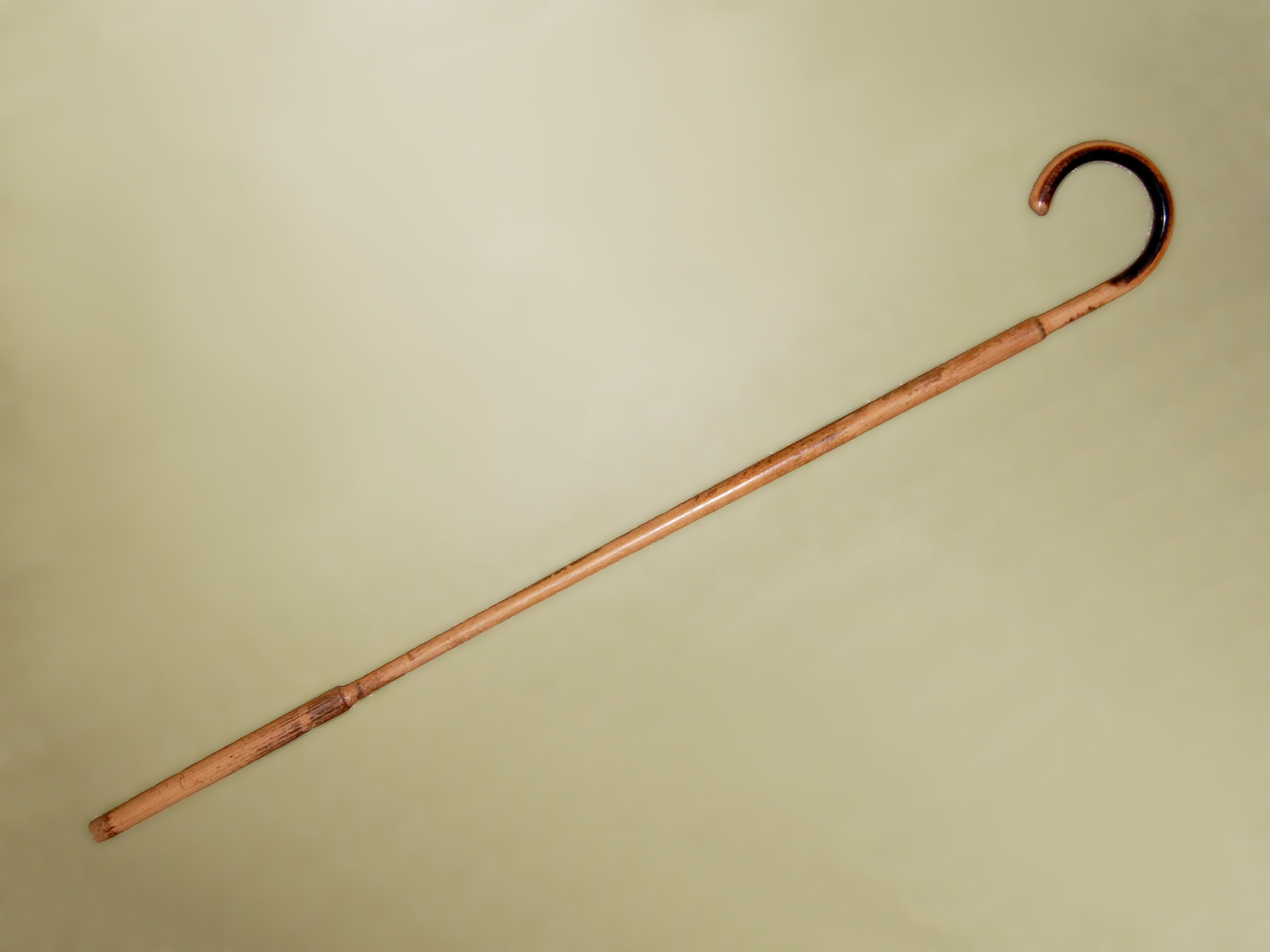
Wooden cane

An assistive cane is a walking stick used as a crutch or mobility aid. A cane can help redistribute weight from a lower leg that is weak or painful, improve stability by increasing the base of support, and provide tactile information about the ground to improve balance. In the US, ten percent of adults older than 65 years use a cane, and 4.6 percent use walkers.

In contrast to crutches, canes are generally lighter, but, because they transfer the load through the user's unsupported wrist, are unable to offload equal loads from the legs.

Another type of crutch is the walker, a frame held in front of the user and which the user leans on during movement. Walkers are more stable due to their increased area of ground contact, but are larger and less wieldy and, like canes, pass the full load through the user's wrists in most cases.

== Parts of medical canes ==
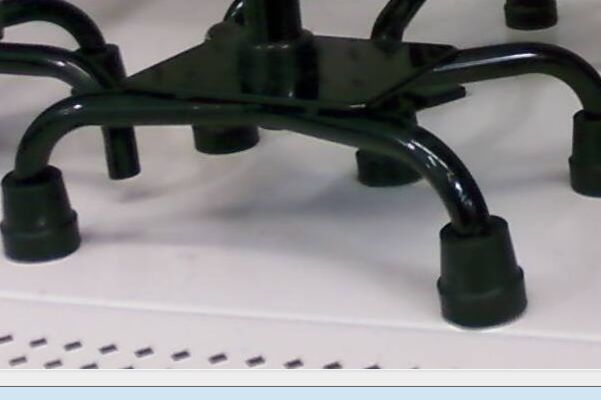
Bottom of a quad cane showing ferrules

The basic cane has four parts. These parts vary depending on the design of the cane and the needs of the user.

- Handle. The handle of a cane is extremely important to the user. Many different styles exist, the most common traditional designs are the Tourist (or Crook) handle, the Fritz Handle and the Derby Handle. Ergonomically shaped handles have become increasingly common for canes intended for medical use, both increasing the comfort of the grip for the user (particularly important for users with disabilities which also affect their hands or wrists), and better transmitting the load from the user's hand and arm into the shaft.
- Collar. The collar of a cane may be only a decorative addition made for stylistic reasons, or may form the structural interface between shaft and handle.
- Shaft. The shaft of the cane transmits the load from the handle to the ferrule and may be constructed from carbon fiber polymer, metal, composites, or traditional wood.
- Ferrule. The tip of a cane provides traction and added support when the cane is used at an angle. Many kinds of ferrules exist, but most common is a simple, ridged rubber stopper. Users can easily replace a ferrule with one that better suits their individual needs.

Modern canes may differ from the traditional fixed structure. For instance, a quad cane has a base attached to the shaft that provides increased stability by having four ferrules, and an adjustable cane may have two shaft segments telescoping one inside the other to allow adjustment for multiple sizes.

All cane users who need a walking cane for medical reasons should consult a medical professional before choosing the style that best suits them. It is particularly important that the cane be the proper height for the individual user.

== Length and user weight ==
For use as a walking aid, it is usually recommended that the length of the stick should be such that the top of the handle reaches the wrist joint when standing up with arms hanging, wearing the footwear to be used with the stick.

Sticks are rated according to the weight they can bear; this is not just a matter of the weight of the user, but depends upon whether the stick is used for light balance and support, or with a great deal of weight placed on the stick. Canes made of carbon fiber or aluminium are stronger than those of the same weight made of other materials such as hardwood.

== Types of canes ==
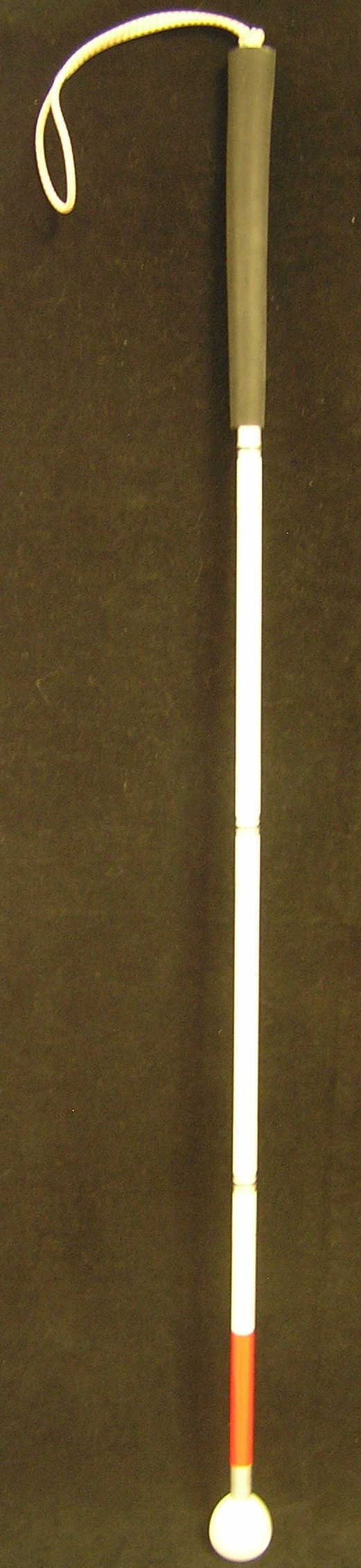
White cane

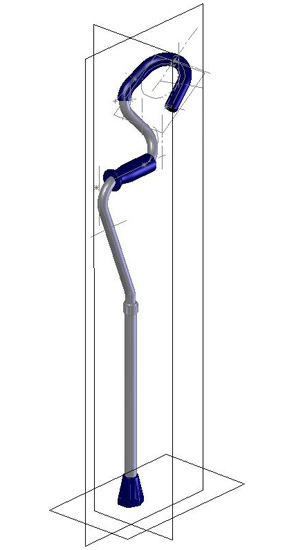
Forearm crutch/cane

- White cane: specifically designed for assisting the visually impaired, these are longer and thinner and allow the user to "feel" the path ahead. They also alert others, such as motorists, that the user is blind and should be regarded with caution. In the UK, red banding on a white cane indicates a deaf-blind user.
- Folding cane: has several joints, generally linked by an internal elastic cord, enabling them to be folded into a shorter length when not in use.
- Forearm cane: a regular or offset cane with additional forearm support, enabling increased stability and load shifted from the wrist to the forearm.
- Quad cane: has four ferrules at the base, enabling them to stand freely, and offering a more firm base for standing.
- Tripod cane: opens in a tripod fashion. Often available with an attached seat.
- Adjustable cane: features two or more shaft pieces for a telescoping effect that allows the user to lengthen or shorten their walking cane to fit to size. This feature can be combined with other variations.
- Shillelagh: a cane made of blackthorn wood with a knob at the top and usable as a weapon, originating in Ireland and still a recognized symbol thereof.

== Accessories ==
- The most common accessory is a hand strap, to prevent loss of the stick should the hand release its grip. These aides are then threaded through a hole drilled into the stick rather than tied around.
- A clip-on frame or similar device can be used to hold a stick against the top of a table.
- In cold climates, a metallic cleat may be added to the foot of the cane. This dramatically increases traction on ice. The device is usually designed so it can easily rotate to the side to prevent damage to indoor flooring.
- Different handles are available to better match the size of the user's hands and their medical needs.
- Rubber ferrules give extra traction on most surfaces.

== Handedness ==
Canes are generally held in the hand that is opposite to the side of the injury or weakness. It allows the cane to be used for stability in a way that lets the user focus much of their weight away from their weaker side and onto the cane. This prevents the person's center of balance from swaying from side to side as they walk. It also allows for fluid movement that better matches walking, as the hand on the opposite side of the leg generally sways forward in normal human locomotion. Due to personal preference or a need to hold the cane in the dominant hand, some cane users hold the cane on the same side as the affected leg.

== See also ==
- Assistive technology
