= Geoffrey Talbot =

12th-century Anglo-Norman nobleman

- Died: around 1140
- Other name: Geoffrey II Talbot
- Occupation: Baron

Geoffrey Talbot (sometimes Geoffrey II Talbot, died around 1140) was a medieval Anglo-Norman nobleman during the civil war of King Stephen of England's reign. His landholdings around Swanscombe are considered to possibly constitute a feudal barony. Although he was at Stephen's court in early 1136, by 1138 Talbot was supporting Stephen's rival, Matilda. After escaping capture twice, Talbot was captured by partisans of Stephen but was released. In 1139 and 1140, Talbot was engaged in military operations around Hereford, which included fortifying Hereford Cathedral in an attempt to take Hereford Castle.

== Early life ==
Talbot was the son of Geoffrey Talbot, who owned lands at Swanscombe in Kent. The younger Talbot's mother was Agnes, wife of the elder Talbot. Her ancestry is unclear, with David Crouch stating she was a member of the de Lacy family. The Complete Peerage states she was probably the daughter of Walter de Lacy and Emma, and sister of Roger and Hugh de Lacy. Katharine Keats-Rohan, however, posits that Agnes was probably the daughter of Helto Dapifer.

Talbot's father is recorded as the holder of the lands around Swanscombe in the 1166 Cartae Baronum, which states that the elder Talbot had the lands sometime before his death and that they passed to the younger Geoffrey. These holdings around Swanscombe are considered by some historians as probably comprising the feudal barony of Swanscombe.

The family was connected in some way with the de Lacy family, as the younger Geoffrey named Gilbert de Lacy as his relative. According to David Crouch, Agnes was Gilbert de Lacy's aunt, which if true would make de Lacy and Talbot first cousins. He was also a relative of Sybil, the wife of Pain fitzJohn, who was his heiress. (Note: The exact relationship between Sybil and Talbot is complicated by the fact that historians disagree about Sybil's parentage. Some historians state that she was the daughter of Hugh de Lacy, others have her as the daughter of Hugh's sister.) He probably served as a household knight for Robert, the Earl of Gloucester.

== Stephen's reign ==
Talbot was present at the Easter court held by King Stephen at Westminster in 1136, along with a number of other nobles, magnates, and ecclesiastics. In April 1138, his force took the town of Hereford from the supporters of King Stephen, and held it for Stephen's rival and cousin, the Empress Matilda. This was part of a concerted rebellion by Matilda's supporters, many of whom were connected with Matilda's half-brother Robert, the Earl of Gloucester. Talbot may have been the chief instigator of the rebellion. By mid-May, Stephen was besieging Talbot in Hereford Castle, a siege that lasted until mid-June, when the castle surrendered. The garrison was allowed to leave unharmed, but Talbot escaped, and fled to the de Lacy castle at Weobley Castle, which also was besieged and surrendered. Again, Talbot escaped capture and fled to Bristol, where Matilda's supporters were gathering.

Talbot and de Lacy then launched an attack on the town of Bath. While scouting, the two men were attacked by forces from the city, and Talbot was captured by forces under the control of the bishop of Bath, Robert of Lewes. The Empress' forces then arranged a parley with the bishop and offered him a safe conduct, but when the bishop showed up at the meeting, he was threatened with hanging unless Talbot was released. The bishop released Talbot under duress. The release affected the bishop's relations with Stephen, who accused the bishop of supporting Matilda, and was only with difficulty persuaded to accept the bishop's explanation.

In October 1139, Talbot was once more in charge of Hereford and withstood an attack by Miles of Gloucester, at that time a supporter of King Stephen. By 1140, he had lost control of the castle and was attempting to regain control of it. Part of his efforts included fortifying Hereford Cathedral. He was joined in his siege efforts by Miles of Gloucester, who had switched sides and was then supporting Matilda.

== Death and legacy ==
Talbot died in about 1140, and his lands passed to Sybil, and her second husband, Josce de Dinan. He was buried in Gloucester Abbey. The lands at Swanscombe were divided between Talbot's two nieces, Cecily and Agnes, the daughters of Sybil and Pain fitzJohn. Cecily married first Roger of Hereford, son of Miles of Gloucester, and second William of Poitou and third Walter de Mayenne, but she had no children by any of her marriages and on her death in 1207, her lands passed to the heirs of her sister Agnes. Cecily's death without heirs also meant that the feudal barony of Swanscombe passed to her sister's heirs. Agnes married first Warin de Mountchesney and second Haldenald de Bidun, and her descendants held the barony of Swanscombe until 1324, when the line died out.
