= Gilbert de Lacy =

12th-century Anglo-Norman baron

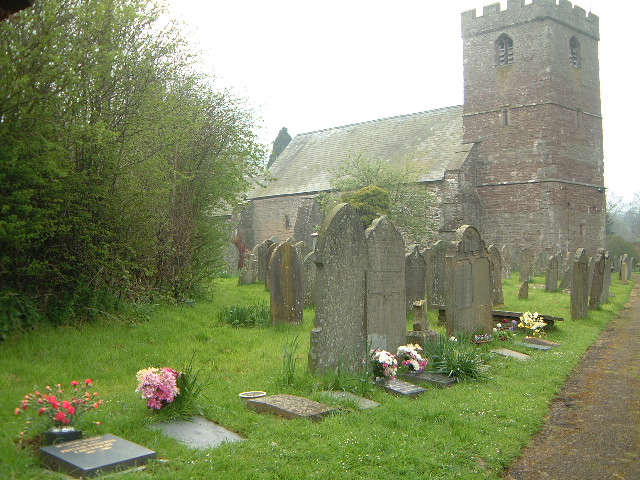
- The churchyard and church at Clodock, some of which dates from the time of Gilbert de Lacy. De Lacy gave the church to Llanthony Priory in the 12th century.
- Died: after 1163
- Known for: Anglo-Norman baron
- Parent: Roger de Lacy
- Relatives: Walter de Lacy – Grandfather

Gilbert de Lacy (died after 1163) was a medieval Anglo-Norman baron in England, the grandson of Walter de Lacy who died in 1085. Gilbert's father forfeited his English lands in 1096, and Gilbert initially only inherited the lands in Normandy. The younger de Lacy spent much of his life trying to recover his father's English lands, and eventually succeeded. Around 1158, de Lacy became a Templar and went to the Holy Land, where he was one of the commanders against Nur ad-Din in the early 1160s. He died after 1163.

== Background and family ==
Gilbert de Lacy was the son of Roger de Lacy, who in turn was the son of Walter de Lacy who died in 1085. (Note: The evidence for this is detailed in W. E. Wightman's work on the Lacy family, where he disproves the occasionally encountered ancestry of Gilbert being the son of Emma de Lacy who was in turn a daughter of Walter de Lacy, with Emma being the sister of Roger de Lacy. This pedigree is based on a 16th-century source, but no contemporary record gives this ancestry. Wightman argues that Gilbert was the son of Roger rather than Roger's brother Hugh due to his inheritance of Roger's lands in Normandy.) Roger de Lacy was banished from England in 1096, and his estates were confiscated. These lands, which included substantial holdings along the border with Wales, were given to Pain fitzJohn, Josce de Dinan and Miles of Gloucester. Roger de Lacy's lands in Normandy, however, were not confiscated, as they were held of the Bishop of Bayeux in feudal tenure.

== Stephen's reign ==
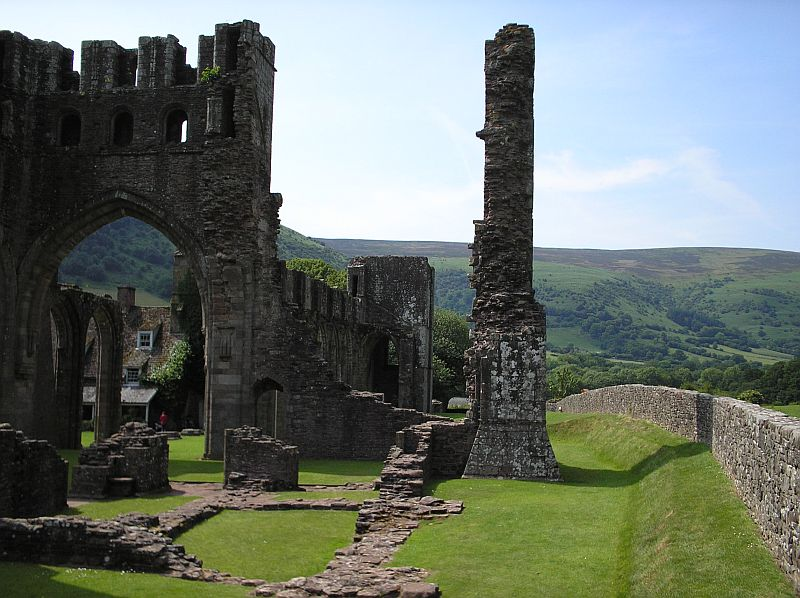
Llanthony Priory

De Lacy had inherited his father's lands in Normandy by 1133, and by 1136 was in England with King Stephen of England. Although de Lacy recovered some of his father's lands, the border lands near Wales were not recovered. Among the lands Gilbert recovered were lands about Weobley. He also was granted some lands in Yorkshire that had been in dispute.

Although de Lacy had spent time at Stephen's court, during the civil war that occurred during Stephen's reign, he switched sides and served Stephen's rival, Matilda the Empress. In 1138, he was besieged by the king at Weobley along with his cousin Geoffrey Talbot, but both men escaped when the king took the castle in June. De Lacy also led an army in an attack against Bath in the service of the Empress, along with Geoffrey Talbot, which also occurred in 1138 and which some historians have seen as the opening act of the civil war.

De Lacy witnessed charters of the Empress in 1141. During the later 1140s, de Lacy was able to recover many of his father's Welsh marcher lands, and one of his efforts at Ludlow was later embroidered in the medieval romance Fouke le Fitz Waryn. He and Miles of Gloucester were claimants to many of the same lands, and during Stephen's reign were generally on opposite sides of the succession dispute. In June 1153, de Lacy was in the company of Matilda's son, Henry fitzEmpress, who became King Henry II of England in 1154.

De Lacy gave land to the cathedral chapter of Hereford Cathedral. He also gave a manor at Guiting to the Knights Templar and two churches, at Weobley and Clodock to Llanthony Priory, which was a monastery founded by his family.

== Later years and death ==
Around 1158, de Lacy surrendered his lands to his eldest son Robert when the elder de Lacy became a member of the Knights Templar. He then travelled through France to Jerusalem, where de Lacy became precentor of the Templars in the County of Tripoli. In 1163, de Lacy was one of the crusader army commanders fighting against Nur ad-Din. He was appointed by Godfrey Martel and Hugh of Lusignan as field commander for the Battle of al-Buqaia.

De Lacy's year of death is unknown, but he was commemorated on 20 November at Hereford Cathedral. Robert died without children sometime before 1162, when Gilbert's younger son Hugh de Lacy inherited the lands.

The Gesta Stephani called de Lacy "a man of judgement and shrewd and painstaking in every operation of war".
