= Pain fitzJohn =

12th-century Norman baron in England

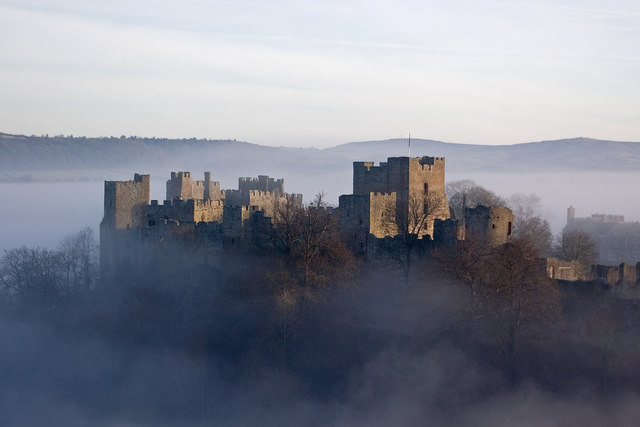
- Modern ruins of Ludlow Castle

Sheriff of Herefordshire
- In office between 1123 and 1127 – after 1136
- Preceded by: Adam de Port
- Succeeded by: Humphrey

Sheriff of Shropshire
- In office after 1126 – after 1135
- Preceded by: Richard de Baumais
- Succeeded by: William fitzAlan

Personal details
- Died: 10 July 1137
- Resting place: Gloucester Abbey
- Spouse: Sybil
- Relations: Eustace (brother); William (brother); Alice (sister); Agnes (sister); John fitzRichard (father)
- Children: Cecily; Agnes
- Parent: John fitzRichard (father)

Pain fitzJohn (Note: Sometimes known as Payn fitzJohn, FitzJohn or Pagan fitzJohn.) (before 1100 – 10 July 1137) was an Anglo-Norman nobleman and administrator, one of King Henry I of England's "new men", who owed their positions and wealth to the king.

Pain's family originated in Normandy, but there is little to suggest that he had many ties there, and he appears to have spent most of his career in England and the Welsh Marches. A son of a minor nobleman, he rose through ability to become an important royal official during Henry's reign. In 1115, he was rewarded with marriage to an heiress, thereby gaining control of the town of Ludlow and its castle, which he augmented with further acquisitions.

Although later medieval traditions described Pain as a chamberlain to King Henry, that position is not securely confirmed in contemporary records. He did hold other offices, however, including that of sheriff in two counties near the border between England and Wales. In his capacity as a royal justice, Pain also heard legal cases for the king throughout much of western England.

After King Henry's death in 1135, Pain supported Henry's nephew, King Stephen, and was with the new king throughout 1136. In July 1137, Pain was ambushed by the Welsh and killed while leading a relief expedition to the garrison at Carmarthen. His heirs were his daughters, Cecily and Agnes. Cecily married the son of one of Pain's close associates, Miles of Gloucester, 1st Earl of Hereford. Pain was generous in his gifts of land to a number of monastic houses.

== Family background ==
Pain was a son, probably the eldest, of John fitzRichard, (Note: The usage of the patronymic "fitz" denotes "son of". This makes Pain's name "Pain, son of John" and his father's name "John, son of Richard".) a tenant-in-chief listed in Domesday Book. (Note: W. E. Wightman wrote in his 1966 study of the Lacy family that Pain was a younger son, rather than the eldest son, but gives no reasoning for this belief.) John may have had two wives, therefore the identity of Pain's mother is uncertain. On the basis of landholding, it has been speculated that Pain's mother was a daughter of Ralph Mortimer, who held Wigmore in Domesday Book. (Note: The basis for this is that both Eustace and Pain held lands in Lincolnshire previously held by Mortimer. Pain also had Wigmore on top of the lands in Lincolnshire. Eustace's son William de Vesci, held lands which were stated to have been "given to a predecessor of William in marriage".) As well as being a moneyer, Pain's paternal grandfather, who came from near Avranches in Normandy, owned a mill. (Note: 19th-century accounts sometimes state that Pain's father, John fitzRichard, was the brother of Serlo de Burg, but later research has shown that John fitzRichard was the son of Richard, himself the son of Ranulf the Moneyer.) Pain's brother, Eustace fitzJohn, became a royal official who owned lands in the north of England. His other siblings included William, Alice and Agnes. William was probably the same William who later held Harptree in Somerset, and in 1130 was a royal justice in western England. Alice was the abbess of Barking Abbey and Agnes became the wife of Roger de Valognes.

Pain was born some time before 1100. His father may have been in the service of King Henry in Normandy before Henry became king. The family lands in England, which were not extensive, were mainly in East Anglia, and Pain appears to have inherited most of them; his payment for danegeld, a tax, in 1130 for his East Anglian properties was 40 shillings, compared to only 9 shillings for his brother Eustace. (Note: The lands of John fitzRichard were valued at about 26 pounds in Domesday Book in 1086.) (Note: Eustace inherited the manor of Saxlingham in Norfolk, but all the other lands in Norfolk held by John fitzRichard went to Pain. The manor of Elsenham in Essex, which Domesday Book recorded as held by John fitzRichard, went to neither Pain nor Eustace, and it is unknown to whom it descended.)

== Marriage and lands ==
All accounts agree that Pain married in 1115 and that his wife was named Sybil, although the identity of Sybil's parents is unclear. Pain's Oxford Dictionary of National Biography entry states that he married Sybil Talbot, the niece of Hugh de Lacy. The Complete Peerage states that he married Sybil, the daughter of Geoffrey Talbot and Talbot's wife Agnes, who was herself probably the daughter of Walter de Lacy. The historian K. S. B. Keats-Rohan states that Pain married Sybil de Lacy, the daughter of Hugh de Lacy, a view shared by fellow historians Judith Green and Paul Dalton. (Note: Among other historians that accept Sybil as Hugh's daughter are Brock Holden and W. E. Wightman.) Others such as Bruce Coplestone-Crow and David Crouch agree with the Oxford Dictionary of National Biography's designation of Sybil as Hugh's niece, and daughter of Geoffrey Talbot and Agnes, the sister of Hugh de Lacy.

King Henry and King Stephen recognised Pain as the legitimate holder of the lands acquired through his wife, Sybil. Her kinsman Gilbert de Lacy was the son of Roger de Lacy, who had been banished from England in 1095 and his English estates confiscated; he had, though, retained his properties in Normandy. Roger's English possessions were given to his brother Hugh de Lacy, from whom Sybil had inherited them. On Roger's death, Gilbert inherited the lands in Normandy and pressed his claim to the family's former English estates. Coplestone-Crow speculates that the uncertainty hanging over the inheritance was one reason why Pain endeavoured to secure more lands around Ludlow.

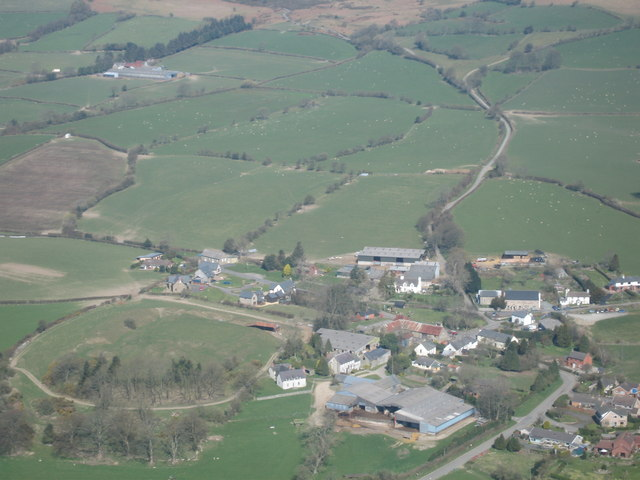
Modern aerial view of Painscastle showing the outline of the motte and bailey castle

Pain is the presumed builder of Pain's Castle in the Welsh county of Radnor. He also controlled Caus Castle in Shropshire, and through his wife Ludlow Castle in the same county. Although he held the title to Weobley Castle, he does not appear to have exercised any control over it, which eventually went to Gilbert de Lacy. Pain was not the only recipient of Hugh de Lacy's lands; some went to Jocelin de Dinan and some to Miles of Gloucester. Pain's share included property in Gloucestershire, Herefordshire, and Worcestershire, and he succeeded in acquiring additional lands near Ludlow, adding to the manors he held there through his wife; his holdings of land were considered to be worth 17 knights fees. By 1130, he had evidently acquired additional properties in Oxfordshire, where he is recorded as being excused payment of danegeld that year.

== Career ==
=== Under Henry I ===
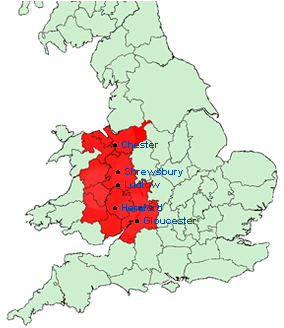
The counties considered to form the Welsh Marches are shown in red, with some major towns.

Pain was too young to serve King William Rufus, but according to the later 12th-century writings of Walter Map he may have been a chamberlain—one of the officials in charge of the royal household—for William's brother, King Henry I (reigned 1100–1135). There is no contemporary evidence for Pain having held that office and nor is it likely, given Map's story, that Pain was involved with Henry's financial affairs; rather it appears that if indeed he was a chamberlain, he was a body servant. Map relates a story about Pain serving the king personally at night, providing Henry with wine if the king called for it. The story continues that Pain once drank the wine and was caught out by Henry when the king subsequently demanded his nightcap. Map finishes the story by saying that the king then ordered that Pain should be given wine every night while awaiting the king's pleasure. Although the story is unlikely to be true in all details, it suggests that Pain's service to the king was personal as well as judicial and governmental. Other evidence against Map's claim that Pain was a chamberlain is that he never attested a royal charter in that office.

The author of the Gesta Stephani described Pain as having been a page at Henry's court, stating that he owed his position to being one of the "special and very intimate friends of King Henry" and that although Pain had been "taken into [Henry's] service as [one of his] court pages", it appears likely that the three fitzJohn brothers—Pain, Eustace and William—worked to advance each other's careers, as they are frequently found witnessing, or attesting, the same charters and other royal documents.

In 1115, Pain was a witness to a charter of confirmation that King Henry issued to Geoffrey de Clive, the Bishop of Hereford, issued in the Welsh Marches. Sometime between 1123 and 1127 he was appointed Sheriff of Herefordshire, and in 1127 became Sheriff of Shropshire also. He held the sheriffdoms of Hereford and Shropshire at least until 1136, and probably until his death. Pain is also often termed the king's "viceregent" or "justiciar" for those counties, and he had the custody of King Henry's prisoner, Waleran of Melun, from September 1126 until late 1126, when Waleran was moved to Wallingford Castle and the custody of Brian fitzCount. (Note: Waleran was a rebel captured in 1124 by Henry.)

Pain was one of Henry's "new men", who owed their positions and wealth to the king. The medieval writer Orderic Vitalis described them as a group as "of base stock who had served him [Henry] well, raised them, so to say, from the dust" and that the king "stationed them above earls and famous castellans". (Note: Castellans are the officials in charge of a castle.) Although Orderic stated that the families of these men were not considered high status, this was probably an exaggeration on the chronicler's part. Pain's family was respectable enough, as his father held a number of properties directly from the king. It appears that Pain did not always take the king's side; the historian C. Warren Hollister has argued that Pain was not among the supporters of Henry's only surviving legitimate child, Matilda, in 1126, when Henry had his nobility swear that they would recognise her as his heiress. Hollister feels that the removal of Waleran from Pain's custody was a sign that Pain had not supported Matilda.

Pain consolidated much of his power in Shropshire and Herefordshire at Bridgnorth Castle, often using that site as a place of business in preference to Shrewsbury, which had previously been the main centre of business for his predecessors as sheriff. As well as Waleran, Pain imprisoned a Welsh hostage there in 1128, Llywelyn ab Owain, the nephew of Maredudd ap Bleddyn, ruler of the Welsh principality of Powys. Besides Bridgnorth, Pain used his possession of Ludlow Castle to consolidate his power in the Welsh Marches. During Henry's reign, the Welsh border was a zone of frequent raids and conflict between the Anglo-Normans and the Welsh.

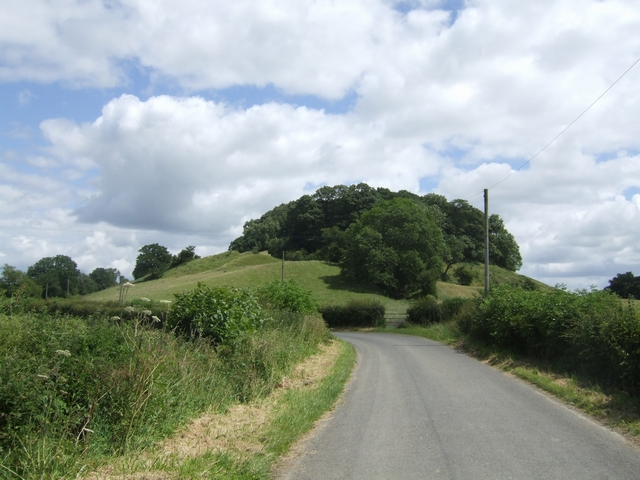
Remains of Caus Castle

The Gesta Stephani indicates that Pain, along with Miles of Gloucester, was a major landholder in the western part of England, and the pair managed to dominate justice in that region. According to the document the two men "raised their power to such a pitch that from the Severn to the sea, all along the border between England and Wales, they involved everyone in litigation and forced services." The later medieval writer Gerald of Wales called Miles and Pain "secretaries and privy councillors of the king".

The 1130 Pipe Roll noted that Pain was a royal justice in Staffordshire, Gloucestershire, and Pembroke. Besides the ordinary court, Pain also heard cases relating to the forest law in those counties. The Pipe Roll does not record Pain as sheriff in Shropshire, but this is likely because the Shropshire returns for that year are missing from it. Also in 1130, Pain was consulted by the king about the appointment to a vacant bishopric. The Diocese of Hereford had been vacant since the death of Richard de Capella in August 1127, and the king consulted with Pain and the constable of Hereford before accepting their candidate—Robert de Bethune, the prior of Llanthony Priory. In 1132 Pain was present, along with his brother, at the Christmas court held by King Henry. Subsequently Caus Castle, which was under Pain's control, was burnt by the Welsh in 1134. As lord of Caus, Pain was involved in efforts to suppress Welsh raiding. Although Pain held Caus, his title to the fortification was unclear, as it had earlier been held by Robert Corbet.

By the end of Henry's reign, Pain had witnessed over 60 royal charters for the king, spanning a period from around 1115 until 1135. Although Pain witnessed a large number of royal documents, this activity took place mostly in England, as few of the documents he witnessed were drawn up while the king was in Normandy. As a reward for his service, Henry gave Pain the lordships of Ewias Lacy and Archenfield, both in Wales.

=== Under Stephen ===
Following King Henry's death in 1135, the succession was disputed between the king's nephews—Stephen and his elder brother, Theobald II, Count of Champagne—and Henry's surviving legitimate child Matilda, usually known as the Empress Matilda because of her first marriage to the Holy Roman Emperor, Henry V. King Henry's only legitimate son, William, had died in 1120. After Matilda was widowed in 1125, she returned to her father, who married her to Geoffrey, Count of Anjou. All the magnates of England and Normandy were required to declare fealty to Matilda as Henry's heir, but when Henry I died in 1135, Stephen rushed to England and had himself crowned before either Theobald or Matilda could react. The Norman barons accepted Stephen as Duke of Normandy, and Theobald contented himself with his possessions in France. Matilda, though, was less sanguine, and secured the support of the Scottish king, David, who was her maternal uncle, and in 1138 also that of her half-brother, Robert, Earl of Gloucester, an illegitimate son of Henry I. (Note: Henry I had more than 20 illegitimate children.)

On Henry's death in December 1135, Pain attended the king's funeral. Pain was an early supporter of King Stephen, although he was said initially to have been afraid to appear at Stephen's court for fear of being confronted by those he had oppressed. Nevertheless, Pain was with the new king by early January 1136, when he witnessed one of Stephen's documents, dated to around 4 January 1136, at Reading. By Easter, both Pain and his brother Eustace had formally submitted to the king. Pain witnessed a royal charter at Oxford in April 1136. The king rewarded the brothers by continuing to appoint them to judicial functions, and confirmed grants made by them to various religious houses.

After Henry's death, the Welsh attempted to drive out the Norman lords who had been extending their control into Wales during Henry's reign. Pain was with King Stephen at the siege of Exeter from June to August 1136, early in the king's reign. Crouch argues that Stephen did not at that time trust Pain, and kept him at the siege to more easily monitor his actions, and to prevent him from defecting to Matilda's cause.

== Relations with the Church ==
In 1119, Pope Callixtus II addressed letters to a group of Anglo-Norman landholders in the Welsh Marches, including Pain, accusing them of having appropriated the lands of the Diocese of Llandaff and ordering their return. Pain was among a group of nobles similarly accused by Pope Honorius II in 1128. Honorius once again ordered the nobles to restore to the Church lands they had confiscated.

Pain gave lands to Llanthony Priory, helping to establish the endowment of that monastic house, although it is difficult to distinguish his gifts from those of Hugh de Lacy, as the monks of Llanthony grouped the gifts of both men together in their records. In addition, Pain granted lands to Gloucester Abbey, which had benefited from the generosity of his father and brother, as did his wife Sybil, together with other grants to her uncle the abbot. She also gave to two churches in Hereford: St Peter and St Guthlac.

== Death and legacy ==
On 10 July 1137, Pain was killed by a javelin blow to the head during an ambush by the Welsh (Note: Only John of Worcester gives the exact date. Likewise, he is the only chronicler who dates the event to 1137, with the Gesta Stephani, John of Hexham, and Richard of Hexham dating the event to 1136 without an exact date. Most modern historians agree with John of Worcester's date.) as he was leading a relief expedition to the garrison at Carmarthen. He was buried in Gloucester Abbey, following a funeral service conducted by Robert de Bethune. A number of barons from the Welsh Marches attended, including Miles of Gloucester. Pain's widow continued to hold Ludlow Castle until the middle of 1139, when she was forced to surrender it to King Stephen. Stephen then gave Sybil in marriage to Jocelin de Dinan, who consequently acquired Ludlow Castle through his new wife, setting up the background to Gilbert Lacy's attempts to seize Ludlow from Dinan on which the medieval Welsh romance work Fouke le Fitz Waryn is based.

Pain's heirs were his two daughters, Cecily and Agnes. His heir male was his brother, Eustace fitzJohn. The two daughters were married five times in total; Cecily married three times but failed to produce any direct heirs. Her first husband was Roger, the son of Miles of Gloucester. Pain arranged Cecily and Roger's marriage. The marriage contract specified that Roger would inherit all of Pain's lands, but as a result of the latter's death, the marriage was not contracted until December 1137, when King Stephen confirmed the terms of the settlement. The king also settled the bulk of the inheritance on Cecily, which led to disturbances and a minor war among disappointed claimants. Agnes married Warin de Munchensy and after his death Haldenald de Bidun. She died after 1185, by which time she was described as a widow.

The historian W. E. Wightman described Pain as a "second-class baron and first-class civil servant".
