= Sybil (wife of Pain fitzJohn) =

12th-century Anglo-Norman noblewoman

Sybil (floruit 1137) was an Anglo-Norman noblewoman in 12th-century England. Her parentage is unclear, but her first marriage to Pain fitzJohn is well attested. Through her marriage, Sybil transferred lands in several shires to her husband, including lands around Ludlow Castle and the castle itself. After Pain's death in 1137, Sybil attempted to retain control of Ludlow and her lands, but in 1139 King Stephen of England married her to Josce de Dinan, who died in 1166. Sybil had two daughters with Pain, and is probably the mother of Josce's two daughters also. Sybil's marriage to Josce, and his control of Ludlow in right of, his wife forms the background to a medieval Welsh romance, Fouke le Fitz Waryn.

== Parentage ==
Historians disagree about Sybil's parentage. One theory, given in the entry for her first husband in the Oxford Dictionary of National Biography states that Sybil was the niece of Hugh de Lacy.

Another theory, coming from The Complete Peerage, states that Sybil was the daughter of Geoffrey Talbot and Talbot's wife Agnes, who was probably the daughter of Walter de Lacy, Hugh's father. (Note: Other historians agreeing with this are Bruce Coplestone-Crow and David Crouch.) Yet another theory, put forth by historian Katharine Keats-Rohan, states Sybil was the daughter of Hugh de Lacy. (Note: Also shared by historians Judith Green, Paul Dalton, Brock Holden and W. E. Wightman.)

== Marriage ==
Sybil married, first, Pain fitzJohn, a marriage that took place around 1115. Through Sybil, Pain acquired a number of holdings around Ludlow Castle, as well as control of the castle itself. Ludlow was an important strategic stronghold which controlled part of the Welsh borders. Sybil also brought her husband lands in Gloucestershire, Herefordshire, and Worcestershire.

Both King Henry I and King Stephen recognized Pain's right to his wife's lands. Sybil had inherited lands that originally had been held by her kinsman Roger de Lacy, who had been banished from England in 1095 and his English estates confiscated; he had, though, retained his properties in Normandy. Roger's English possessions were given to his brother Hugh de Lacy, from whom Sybil had inherited them.

On Roger's death, his son Gilbert inherited the lands in Normandy and pressed his claim to the family's former English estates. Coplestone-Crow notes that there was uncertainty hanging over the inheritance, and accounted for one reason why Sybil's husband worked to secure more lands around Ludlow.

Sybil was not the only recipient of Hugh de Lacy's largesse; some went to Josce de Dinan and some to Miles of Gloucester.

== Widowhood ==
Pain died on 10 July 1137 and was buried in Gloucester Abbey. Sybil retained control of Ludlow Castle until the middle of 1139, when she was forced to surrender it to King Stephen after a siege. Stephen then married Sybil to Josce de Dinan, probably because he felt that Josce was trustworthy enough to control the castle.

Dinan thus acquired control of Ludlow Castle in right of his wife, setting up the background to Gilbert de Lacy's attempts to seize Ludlow from Dinan, on which the medieval Welsh romance work Fouke le Fitz Waryn is based. Josce, however, rebelled against Stephen and fortified Ludlow against the king. Josce died in 1166.

== Children ==
Sybil had two daughters, Cecily and Agnes, with Pain. The two girls married five times in their lives; Cecily's three marriages failed to produce any direct heirs. Cecily was first married to Roger, the son of Miles of Gloucester. This alliance had been arranged by Cecily's father and the marriage contract specified that Roger would inherit all of Pain's lands, but at Pain's death the marriage had still not been formally contracted. In December 1137, King Stephen confirmed the terms of the settlement. Stephen also settled the bulk of Pain's lands on Cecily, which led to disturbances and a minor war among disappointed claimants. Agnes first married Warin de Munchensy and then Haldenald de Bidun. She died sometime after 1185 when she was noted as a widow.

Presumably, Sybil is the mother of Josce's two daughters—Sibil, who married Hugh de Pulgenet and died in 1212, and Hawise, who married Fulk FitzWarin, who died in 1197. In 1199, Sibil and Hawise petitioned the king regarding the ownership of the town and castle of Ludlow, but were turned down.
