= Hereford Castle =

Castle in Hereford, England

Coordinates: 52.052414°N 2.712169°W

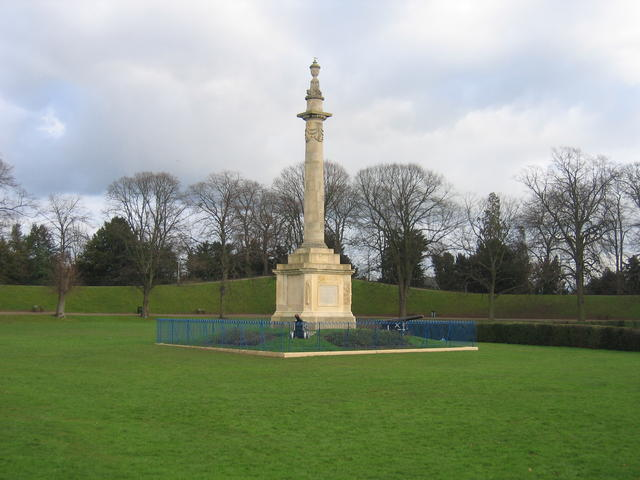
A monument, erected 1809, on the site of the bailey of Hereford Castle

Hereford Castle is a castle that used to be in the cathedral city of Hereford, the county town of Herefordshire, England (grid reference SO511396). Founded sometime before 1052, it was one of the earliest castles in England. Hereford Castle was probably destroyed when the Welsh sacked Hereford in 1055, but seems to have been replaced by the following decade. During the civil war, when Stephen sought to usurp Queen Matilda, the castle was besieged three times; the garrison surrendered each time and control of Hereford Castle changed hands.

== History ==
=== Early history ===
During the 11th century, the county of Herefordshire was subject to attacks from Wales. Rather than repairing the town defences of Hereford, the county town, Ralph (son of the Count of Vexin) chose to build a castle within the settlement's defences. Ralph was made Earl of Hereford in about 1046; the date of the castle's foundation is uncertain, but it was present by 1052. This first castle is thought to have occupied the area of the later castle, in the east of the town. The areas to the north and west were densely occupied, and to the south was the River Wye. In 1055, the town and castle of Hereford were sacked by the Welsh. The Anglo-Saxon Chronicle recorded the incident:

And they gathered a great force with the Irishmen and the Welsh: and Earl Ralph collected a great army against them at the town of Hereford; where they met; but ere there was a spear thrown the English people fled, because they were on horses. The enemy then made a great slaughter ther – about four hundred or five hundred men; they on the other side none. They went then to the town, and burned it utterly; and the large minster also which the worthy Bishop Athelstan had caused to be built, that they plundered and bereft of relic and of reef, and of all things whatever; and the people they slew, and led some away.

Harold Godwinson repaired the town's defences in 1056, but what happened to the castle is not mentioned. Shortly after the Norman Conquest in 1066, William FitzOsbern was made Earl of Hereford. He may have rebuilt the castle as it was in use in 1067 when the Anglo-Saxon Chronicle noted that Eadric the Wild harassed its garrison. In 1071 William FitzOsbern died and his son Roger took over possession of the castle. He was involved in an unsuccessful attempt to depose King William and consequently forfeited the castle.

In April 1138, Geoffrey Talbot captured Hereford Castle from supporters of King Stephen. Later that year Stephen besieged the castle until it surrendered. In 1140 during the Anarchy Geoffrey Talbot and Miles of Gloucester captured the castle from the garrison supporting King Stephen. During the siege the cemetery of the Church of St Guthlac was desecrated. The Gesta Stephani recorded the event:

everywhere the townsmen were uttering cries of lamentation, either because the earth of their kinfolk's graveyard was being heaped up to form a rampart and they could see, a cruel sight, the bodies of parents and relations, some half-rotten, some quite lately buried, pitilessly dragged from the depths; or because at one time it was visible that catapults were being put up

Geoffrey Talbot and Miles of Gloucester set up siege engines so that the castle was attacked from two directions, and the garrison eventually surrendered. In 1154 Matilda's son Henry II granted the motte of Hereford to Roger of Gloucester but a rebellion followed and Henry retook possession and for the rest of its history the castle remained royal. In 1216 John made Walter de Lacy sheriff of the county of Herefordshire and granted him the custody of the Royal castle at Hereford and the following year work was undertaken to strengthen the castle against the Welsh attacks.

During the Second Barons' War from 1264 and 1267 the castle came for a time the headquarters of the baronial party headed by Simon de Montfort and during the Owain Glyndŵr rebellion from 1400 to 1411 King Henry IV based himself at Hereford castle preparing sorties and campaigns into Wales.

=== Later history ===
During the Civil War Herefordshire was very much a Royalist stronghold but the castle does not appear to have played a significant part, although the city changed hands several times and was subjected to an unsuccessful Scottish siege in 1645. It was eventually sold to Sir Richard Harley and several of his friends but it then went into decline. Most of what remained of the castle seems to have been destroyed in the 1650s and the stone used for other buildings within the city.

According to John Leland, the antiquary, in the early 16th century the castle at Hereford was once "nearly as large as that of Windsor' and 'one of the fairest and strongest in all England".

In 1752 the ruins were leased to the Society of Tempers and the site was transformed into what is today Castle Green and, in 1833, the Castle Green (which had been the bailey of the castle) was leased to the county council for a period of 200 years. The council is still responsible today for the maintenance and upkeep of the area in its present form of a recreation area.

A monument to Lord Nelson standing on the site today was erected in the centre of the bailey in 1809.

== See also ==
- History of Herefordshire
