= Walter de Lacy =

Walter de Lacy may refer to:

- Walter de Lacy, Lord of Weobley and Ludlow (died 1085), Norman nobleman
- Walter de Lacy, Lord of Meath (c. 1172–1241)
