= Gerard de Limesay =

English noble

- Noble family: Limesay family
- Spouse: Amica de Bidun
- Father: Alan de Limesay

Gerard de Limesay or de Limési, Lord of Wolverley, was a 12th-century English noble.

He was the eldest son of Alan de Limesay or de Limési. Gerard succeeded his father in 1162 and died circa 1185. Upon the death of his son John in 1193 and grandson Hugh in 1198, without issue, the barony of Limesay was split into moieties between Gerard's daughters.

== Marriage and issue ==
Gerard married Amica, daughter of Halenald de Bidun, they are known to have had the following issue:

- John de Limesay (died 1193), married Alice de Harcourt, had issue. Hugh their son died without issue.
- Alice or Aleanora de Limesay, married William de Lindsay, had issue.
- Basilia de Limesay, married Hugh de Odingseles, had issue.
