= Old Buckenham Priory =

Priory in Old Buckenham, Norfolk, England

Coordinates: 52.4911°N 1.0497°E

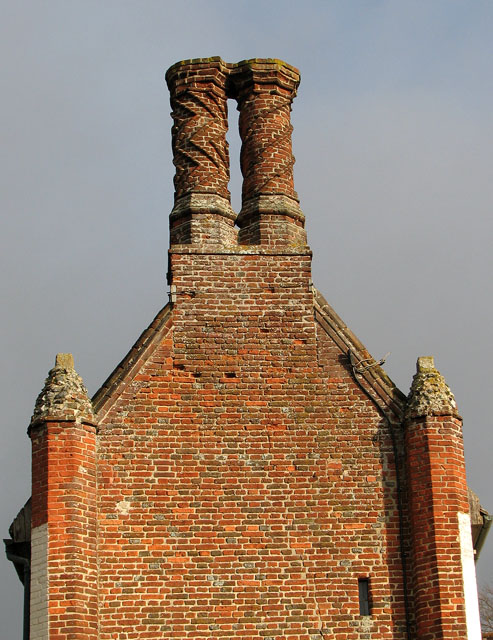
Abbey Farm, Old Buckenham - Old Priory hall chimneys

Old Buckenham Priory was an Augustinian priory built on the site of Old Buckenham Castle at Old Buckenham in Norfolk, England.

The priory was founded circa 1146 by William de Albini and his wife Queen Adeliza (widow of King Henry I). The foundation charter endowed the priory with the site of the old Buckenham castle and the rectories of All Saints and St. Andrews in the manor of Buckenham. The priory was dedicated to St Mary, St James, and All Saints, and the canons were to follow the rule of the order of St Augustine.

Following further donations of land and other benefactions the abbey, by 1291, held property in 42 Norfolk parishes. The fraternity consisted of the prior and between eight and ten canons, supported by a number of temporal staff. The priory was suppressed in 1537 as part of the Dissolution of the Monasteries carried out under King Henry VIII. Following the closure Sir Edmund Knevett, of Buckenham Castle, was granted a lease of the priory lands. The site is now part of Abbey Farm.

All that remains above ground of the priory itself is a single lump of mortared flint.

== Burials ==
- Warin de Munchensy and wife Agnes FitzPayn
