= History of Herefordshire =

History of the English county

The known history of Herefordshire extends from King Athelstan's reign to the modern day.

== History ==
The history of Herefordshire starts with a shire in the time of King Athelstan (r. 895–939), and Herefordshire is mentioned in the Anglo-Saxon Chronicle in 1051. The first Anglo-Saxon settlers, the 7th-century Magonsætan, were a sub-tribal unit of the Hwicce who occupied the Severn valley. The undulating hills of marl clay were surrounded by the Welsh mountains to the west; by the Malvern Hills to the east; by the Clent Hills of the Shropshire borders to the north, and by the indeterminate extent of the Forest of Dean to the south. The shire name first recorded in the Anglo-Saxon Chronicle may derive from "Here-ford", Old English for "army crossing", the location for the city of Hereford.

The area was absorbed into the Mercian kingdom by Offa of Mercia (r. 757–796), who – traditionally – constructed Offa's Dyke as a boundary to keep warring Western tribes out of Mercia: an early indication of ambivalent relations between the Anglo-Saxons and the Welsh. The shire as an administrative unit was developed from Burghal Hidage (c. 915–917), of Alfred the Great's son Edward the Elder (r. 899–924) and from the Shire-reeve courts of the Hundred. In 676, during the reign of King Æthelred of Mercia the Archbishop of Canterbury Saint Theodore of Tarsus founded the Diocese of Hereford to minister to the minor sub-kingdom of Magonsaete, and he appointed Putta as the first Bishop of Hereford. The establishment of a centre of law and justice was supported by a monastic chapter that flourished during the tenth-century reformation. Hereford's geographical location at the hub of the shire allowed Anglo-Saxon ealdormen to manage affairs; and Hereford played a vital role in the Scandinavian wars until Ralph, Earl Hereford was deposed (1055) by the regal Earl Harold Godwinson.

In the feudal Domesday Survey some adjacent areas of the Welsh Marches are assessed under Herefordshire. The western and southern borders remained debatable ground ("Archenfield") until, with the incorporation of the Welsh Marches in 1535, considerable territory was annexed to Herefordshire. These areas formed the hundreds of Wigmore, Ewyas Lacy and Huntington, while Ewyas Harold was subsumed into Webtree Hundred. At the time of the Domesday Survey the divisions of the county were very unsettled. As many as nineteen hundreds are mentioned, but these were of varying extent, some containing only one manor, some from twenty to thirty. Of the twelve modern hundreds, only Greytree, Radlow, Stretford, Wolphy and Wormelow retained their original Domesday names. The others were Broxash, Ewyas-Lacy, Grimsworth, Huntington, Webtree and Wigmore. Herefordshire is on the Welsh border (and before that the ancient boundary of the Welsh Marches).

In the modern era the boundaries of the Forest of Dean were not set until 1832 by several hundred boundary stones some of which still exist to this day. A unique source for the history of the county is the Chained Library at Hereford Cathedral which contained some of the earliest printed books in Europe, printed by the Gutenberg press. During the English Civil Wars it acted as a royal treasury.

During the medieval period the county had been defined in law by violence and cruel punishments. It played a large part in various civil wars and gave rise to Lollardism. A fiercely independent folk and a position on the border with Wales gave the county a reputation for a frontier mentality.

== Historical setting ==
=== Welsh control ===
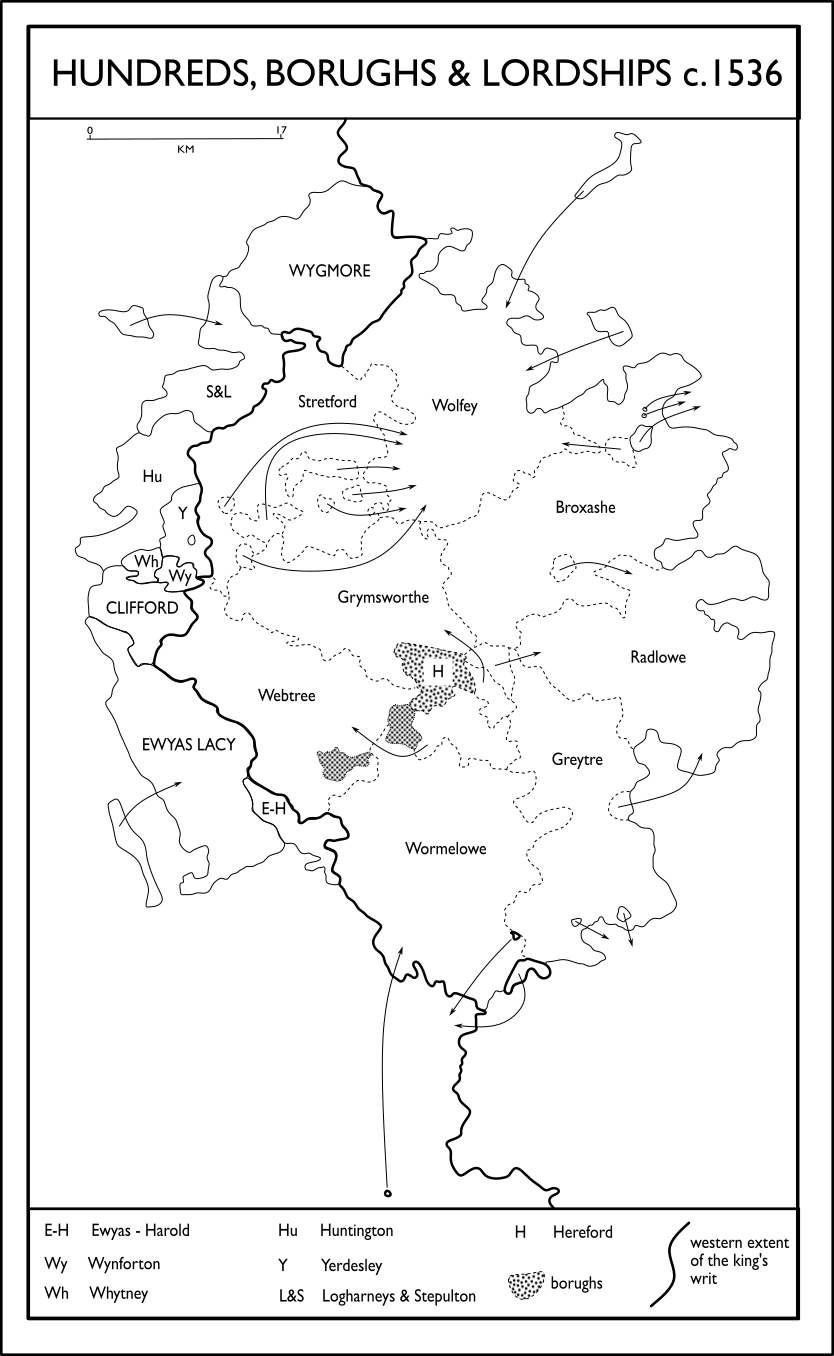

Before the arrival of the West Saxons, the region roughly corresponding to modern Herefordshire lay under the control of earlier Welsh kingdoms, principally the minor kingdom of Ergyng. Welsh origins in Herefordshire are evident in the survival of the Welsh language in parts of the county until the 19th century, the survival of many Welsh place names and the historic Welsh commote of Archenfield. In 1887 it was written:

"Archenfield was still Welsh enough in the time of Elizabeth for the bishop of Hereford to be made responsible together with the four Welsh bishops for the translation of the Bible and the Book of Common Prayer into Welsh. Welsh was still commonly spoken here in the first half of the nineteenth century, and we are told that churchwardens' notices were put up in both Welsh and English until about 1860."

Welsh was spoken by individuals until comparatively recently. The photograph shown is of a plaque in Welsh on display in St Margaret's Church, near Newton, which was dismantled from the roof of the nave during restoration in 1902. The plaque is dated 1574.

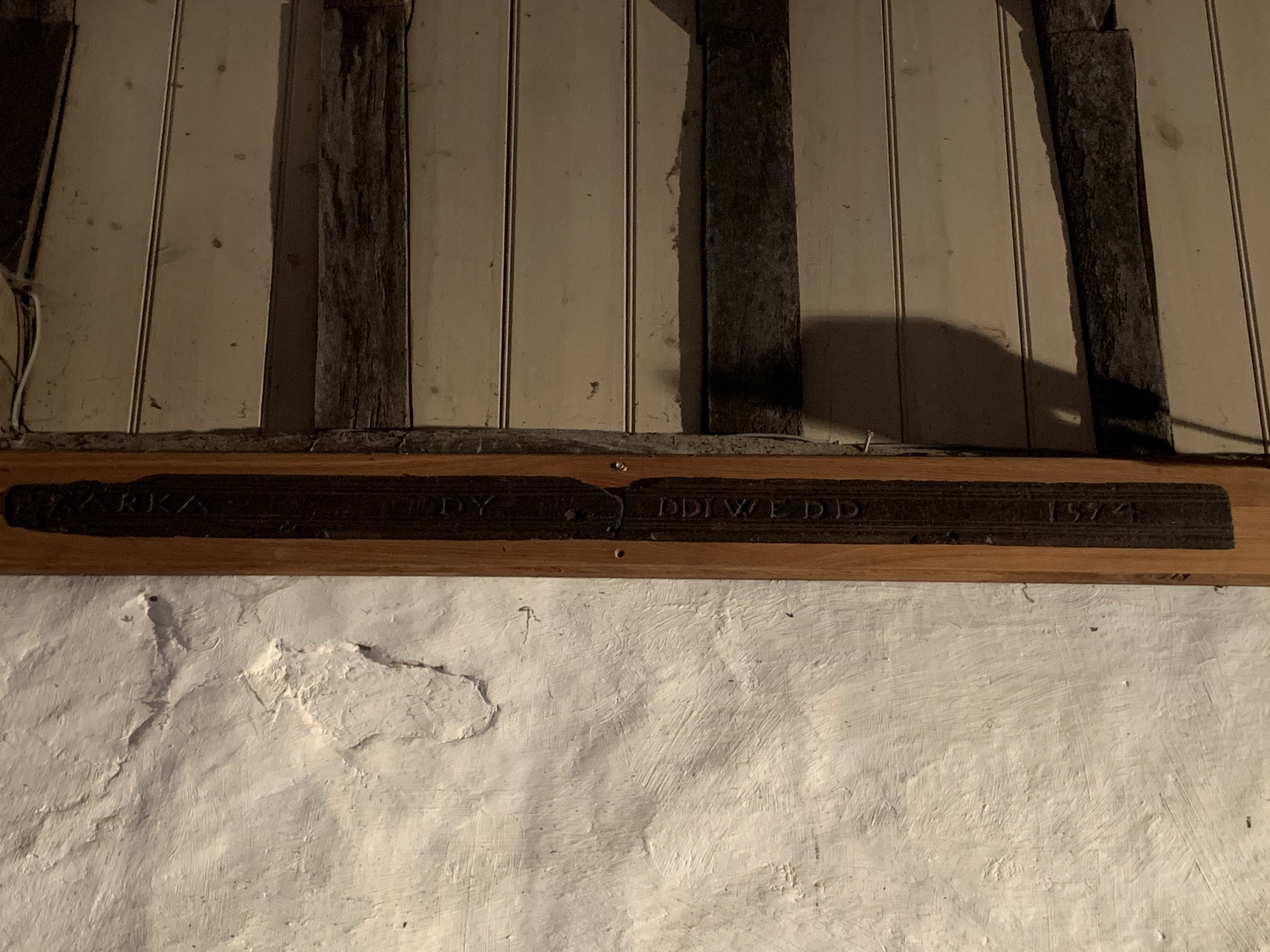
Plaque in Welsh Karka Dy ddiwedd, trans. 'Be mindful of your end', and dated 1574

A bilingual printed notice of the duties of churchwardens is also displayed in St Margaret's Church. It is likely to be at least 170 years old, since the churches transferred from the Diocese of St Davids to that of Hereford in the middle of the 19th century. Two fire-damaged Welsh bibles from Rowlestone are kept in the Herefordshire County Archives.

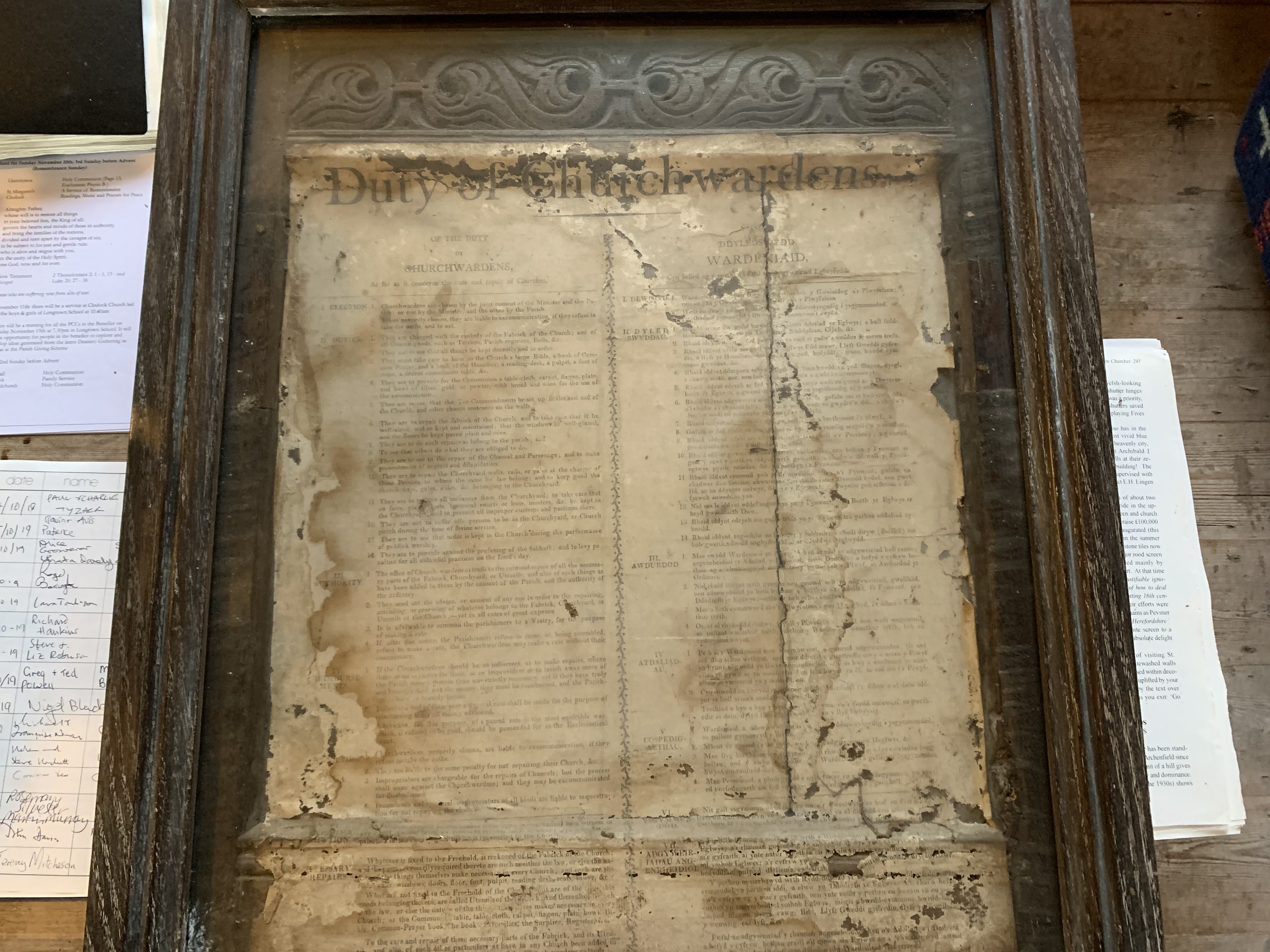
Notice of duties of Churchwardens in English and Welsh, in St Margaret's Church, Herefordshire

=== Anglo-Saxon control ===
At some time in the 7th century the West Saxons pushed their way across the Severn and established themselves in the territory between Wales and Mercia, and established the minor kingdom of Magonset, which was later absorbed into Mercia. The district which is now Herefordshire was occupied by a tribe, the Hecanas, who congregated chiefly in the fertile area about Hereford and in the mining districts round Ross-on-Wye. In the 8th century Offa extended the Mercian frontier to the Wye, securing it by the earthwork known as Offa's Dyke.

=== Danish and Norman control ===
A report in the Herefordshire Archaeology and Historic Environment Record provides this chronology of 9th Century involvement with the Danes:

During the 9th century the Vikings were able to make incursions into the south of Herefordshire by sailing up the Severn and Wye rivers. Between AD 866 and 874 King Burgred of Mercia was involved in almost constant battles with the Vikings. By 877 the Vikings were in the position of being able to establish one of their own leaders, Ceolwulf, as king.

In 2015, two individuals (operating without landowner permission), using metal detectors, found a large hoard near Leominster consisting primarily of Saxon jewellery and silver ingots but also coins; the latter date to around 879 CE. According to a news report, "experts believe it [the hoard] was buried by a Viking during a series of raids known to have taken place in the area at that time", while Wessex was ruled by Alfred the Great and Mercia by Ceolwulf II of Mercia. Imperial coins recovered from the treasure hunters depicted both Alfred the Great and Ceolwulf II of Mercia, indicating "a previously-unknown alliance between the kingdoms of Wessex and Mercia" according to a news report. "These coins enable us to re-interpret our history at a key moment in the creation of England as a single kingdom," said Gareth Williams, curator of early medieval coins at the British Museum.

A listing about the Archenfield area of Herefordshire appeared in the 1870-72 Imperial Gazetteer of England and Wales with the following specifics about early incidents involving the Danes:

IRCHINGFIELD, or ARCHENFIELD, a quondam liberty and a rural deanery in the S of Hereford. The liberty was known to the ancient Welsh as Urging, to the Saxons as Ircingafeld, and at Domesday as Arcenfelde; was ravaged in 905 by the Danes, and given afterwards, by the Crown, to the Earls of Shrewsbury; and had the custom of gavelkind, and some other peculiar customs.

In 914 CE the Danes again made their way up the Severn to the district of Archenfield and ravaged the area. According to the Anglo-Saxon Chronicle (915 CE, Worcester Manuscript, p. 99), the jarls leading the raids, Ohtor and Hroald, captured Cyfeiliog, also referred to as Cameleac or Cimeliauc, the Bishop of Llandaff. The bishop was later ransomed by King Edward the Elder for forty pounds in silver. The "jarl Hroald and the other jarl Ohtor's brother" were killed in 915 CE, probably at "Killdane Field" (or "Kill Dane") in Weston-under-Penyard and the raiders left the area, leaving some hostages as a peace bond.

In 921 CE, the Danes besieged Wigmore, which had been rebuilt in that year by Edward the Elder.

From the time of its first settlement the district was the scene of constant border warfare with the Welsh, and Harold, whose earldom included this county, ordered that any Welshman caught trespassing over the border should lose his right hand. In the period preceding the Conquest much disturbance was caused by the outrages of the Norman colony planted in this county by Edward the Confessor. Richard I's castle in the north of the county was the first Norman fortress erected on English soil, and Wigmore, Ewyas Harold, Clifford, Weobley, Hereford, Donnington and Caldicot were all the sites of Norman strongholds. Then William the Conqueror entrusted the subjugation of Herefordshire to William FitzOsbern, but Edric the Wild, in conjunction with the Welsh, prolonged violent resistance against him for two years.

=== Return to English control ===
During "The Anarchy" – the prolonged civil war of Stephen's reign – Hereford Castle and Weobley castle were held against the king, but were captured in 1138. Prince Edward, afterwards Edward I, was imprisoned in Hereford Castle, and famously escaped from there in 1265. In 1326 the parliament assembled at Hereford deposed Edward II. In the 14th and 15th centuries the forest of Deerfold gave refuge to some of the most noted followers of Wycliffe. During the Wars of the Roses the influence of the Mortimers led the county to support the Yorkist cause, and Edward, afterwards Edward IV, raised 23,000 men in this neighbourhood. The Battle of Mortimer's Cross was fought in 1461 near Wigmore. Before the outbreak of the civil war of the 17th century, complaints of illegal taxation were rife in Herefordshire, but a strong anti-Puritan feeling induced the county to favour the royalist cause. Hereford, Goodrich and Ledbury all endured sieges.

== Earls of Hereford ==
The earldom of Hereford was granted by William I to William FitzOsbern, about 1067, but on the outlawry of his son Roger in 1074 the title lapsed until conferred on Henry de Bohun about 1199. It remained in the possession of the de Bohuns until the death of Humphrey de Bohun, 7th Earl of Hereford in 1373; in 1397 Henry, Earl of Derby, afterwards King Henry IV, who had married Mary de Bohun, was created Duke of Hereford. Edward VI created Walter Devereux, a descendant of the de Bohun family, Viscount Hereford, in 1550, and his grandson, the famous earl of Essex, was born in this county. Since this date the viscounty has been held by the Devereux family, and the holder ranks as the premier viscount of England. The families of Clifford, Giffard and Mortimer figured prominently in the warfare on the Welsh border, and the Talbots, Lacys, Crofts and Scudamores all had important seats in the county, Sir James Scudamore of Holme Lacy being the original of the Sir Scudamore of Spenser's Faerie Queene. Sir John Oldcastle, the leader of the Lollards, was sheriff of Herefordshire in 1406, before arrest and execution for treason by Henry V.

=== Diocese ===
Herefordshire has been included in the diocese of Hereford since its foundation in 676. In 1291 it comprised the Deaneries of Hereford, Weston, Leominster, Weobley, Frome, Archenfield and Ross in the Archdeaconry of Hereford, and the Deaneries of Burford, Stottesdon, Ludlow, Pontesbury, Clun and Wenlock, in the Archdeaconry of Shropshire. In 1877 the name of the Archdeaconry of Shropshire was changed to Ludlow, and in 1899 the Deaneries of Abbey Dore, Bromyard, Kingsland, Kington and Ledbury were created in the Archdeaconry of Hereford. The Bishop held a number of Peculiarities in another jurisdiction: Dymock in Gloucestershire was named after a Queen's Champion from Lincolnshire who fought in the Welsh Wars for Edward I but the manor long had connections with the Talbots, manorial landowners and familial relations from the county, proven by recent archaeology. The manor was also occupied by the Roundheads and Scots during the Civil Wars, was on the railway line, and on the earlier canal from Hereford city.

== Politics ==
Herefordshire was governed by a sheriff as early as the reign of Edward the Confessor, the shire court meeting at Hereford where later the assizes and quarter sessions were also held. In 1606 a bill (Note: "A bill for explaining the Act 34 & 35 H. VIII., c. 26.") was promoted in the House of Commons to declare Hereford free from the jurisdiction of the Council of Wales, but it was rejected by the House of Lords; the county was not finally relieved from the interference of the Marcher Lords until the reign of William III and Mary II. Herefordshire was first represented in Parliament in 1295, when it returned two members, the boroughs of Ledbury, Hereford, Leominster and Weobley being also represented. Hereford was again represented in 1299, and Bromyard and Ross in 1304, but the boroughs made very irregular returns, and from 1306 until Weobley regained representation in 1627, only Hereford and Leominster were represented. Under the Reform Act 1832 the county returned three members and Weobley was disfranchised. The Reform Act 1867 deprived Leominster of one member, and under the Reform Act 1885 Leominster was disfranchised, and Hereford lost one member.

== Economy ==
Herefordshire has always been esteemed as an exceptionally rich agricultural area; the manufactures were comparatively unimportant, except for the woollen and cloth trade which flourished soon after the Conquest. Iron was worked in Wormelow hundred in Roman times, and the Domesday Survey mentions iron workers in Marcle. At the time of Henry VIII the towns had become much impoverished, and Elizabeth, to encourage local industries, insisted on her subjects wearing English-made caps from the factory of Hereford. Hops were grown in the county soon after their introduction into England in 1524. In 1580 and again in 1637 the county was severely visited by the plague, but in the 17th century it had a flourishing timber trade, and was also noted for its orchards and cider.

== Bibliography ==
- Aylmer, G., & Tiller, J., (eds) Hereford Cathedral: A History, (London, 2000)
- Bannister, A.T., Herefordshire and Its Place in English History, (Hereford, 1905).
- This article incorporates text from a publication now in the public domain: Chisholm, Hugh, ed. (1911). "Herefordshire". Encyclopædia Britannica. Vol. 13 (11th ed.). Cambridge University Press. pp. 355–358.
- Cooke, W.H., Matthews, J.H., and Watkins, Morgan G., Collections Towards the History and Antiquities of the County of Hereford (Hereford, 1882, 1897, 1913–15)
- Duncumb, John, General View of the Agriculture of the County of Hereford, (1805)
- Duncumb, J., Collections Towards the History and Antiquities of the County of Hereford [1804] (Cardiff, 1997)
- Heath-Agnew, E., A History of Herefordshire Cattle and Their Breeders, London, 1993
- Hopkinson, C., Herefordshire Under Arms, (Bromyard, 1985)
- Smith, B., Herefordshire Maps 1577-1800 (Woonton Almeley: Logaston Press, 2004)
- Williams, W.R., The Parliamentary History of the County of Hereford, (Brecknock, 1896)
