= Robert of Bath =

12th-century Bishop of Bath

- Bishop of Bath
- Appointed: before March 1136
- Term ended: 31 August 1166
- Predecessor: Godfrey
- Successor: Reginald fitz Jocelin
- Other posts: monk of Lewes Priory; Possibly Prior of Winchester

Orders
- Consecration: probably March 1136

Personal details
- Born: England
- Died: 31 August 1166
- Buried: Bath Abbey

Robert or sometimes Robert of Lewes (died 1166) was a medieval English Bishop of Bath. He began his career as a monk at Lewes Priory as well as performing administrative functions for Henry of Blois. It was Henry who secured Robert's selection as bishop. While bishop, Robert built in his diocese and set up the system of archdeacons there. He may have been the author of the Gesta Stephani, a work detailing the history of King Stephen's life.

== Life ==
Robert was a native of England, but his ancestry was Flemish, probably of noble birth. His birthdate and when he became a monk are not known. He was a Cluniac and a monk of Lewes Priory and a protégé of Henry of Blois who employed him at Glastonbury Abbey on administrative tasks. He may have been the prior of Winchester Cathedral but there is no certain evidence of this, as it is based on an appearance of a "Robert, prior of Winchester" on the 1130 Pipe Roll, and a 15th-century historian. He was named Bishop of Bath through the influence of Henry of Blois, and was consecrated probably in March 1136.

Robert was instrumental in reorganizing his diocese as well as building and restoration work at Wells. He was the bishop who set up the territorial organization of the archdeacons of the diocese. Contemporaries considered him pious as well as a man of business. Robert continued the building work on church building at Bath, and gave borough status to the town of Wells. He also reorganized the church at Wells, which had previously been the cathedral for the diocese prior to John of Tours moving the episcopal seat to Bath.

In 1138, during Robert of Gloucester's rising against King Stephen of England, Robert was in charge of the defenses of Bath. He captured Geoffrey Talbot, who was a supporter of Robert of Gloucester's, but when he went out to parley with another group of Gloucester's supporters, the bishop was captured even though he had been offered a safe conduct for the parley. The bishop was then exchanged for Geoffrey Talbot. In 1141, he was at the gathering where Henry of Blois changed allegiance to the Empress Matilda at Winchester.

Robert died 31 August 1166 and was buried in Bath Abbey before the high altar. He may have been the author of the Gesta Stephani, an identification first made by the historian R. H. C. Davis in 1962. While it is not certain that Robert was the author, the outlook of the work certainly fits with the known outlook of Robert.

== Citations ==
Catholic Church titles
Preceded by Godfrey	Bishop of Bath; 1136–1166	Succeeded by Reginald fitz Jocelin
