= John of Tours =

12th-century Bishop of Bath and Wells

- Bishop of Bath (previously Wells)
- Appointed: 1088
- Term ended: December 1122
- Predecessor: Gisa
- Successor: Godfrey
- Other post: royal chaplain

Orders
- Consecration: July 1088 by Lanfranc

Personal details
- Born: Tours
- Died: December 1122
- Buried: Bath Cathedral

John of Tours or John de Villula (died 1122) was a medieval Bishop of Wells in England who moved the diocese seat to Bath. He was a native of Tours and was King William I of England's doctor before becoming a bishop. After his consecration as bishop, he was either given or purchased Bath Abbey, a rich monastery, and then moved the headquarters of the diocese from Wells to the abbey. He rebuilt the church at Bath, building a large cathedral that no longer survives. He gave a large library to his cathedral and received the right to hold a fair in Bath. Not noted for his scholarship, he died suddenly in 1122.

== Early life ==
A native of Tours, John was an Angevin-French physician to King William I of England, being present at the king's deathbed in 1087. William of Malmesbury, the medieval chronicler, called him "a very skilled doctor, not in theoretical knowledge, but in practice." He had been a priest of Tours prior to becoming doctor to King William. He seems to have learned his medical skills not in a school, but was considered a skilled doctor. The name "de Villula" first appears in 1691, and is not a contemporary name. It resulted from a misreading of John's name in his episcopal profession.

== Bishop of Bath ==
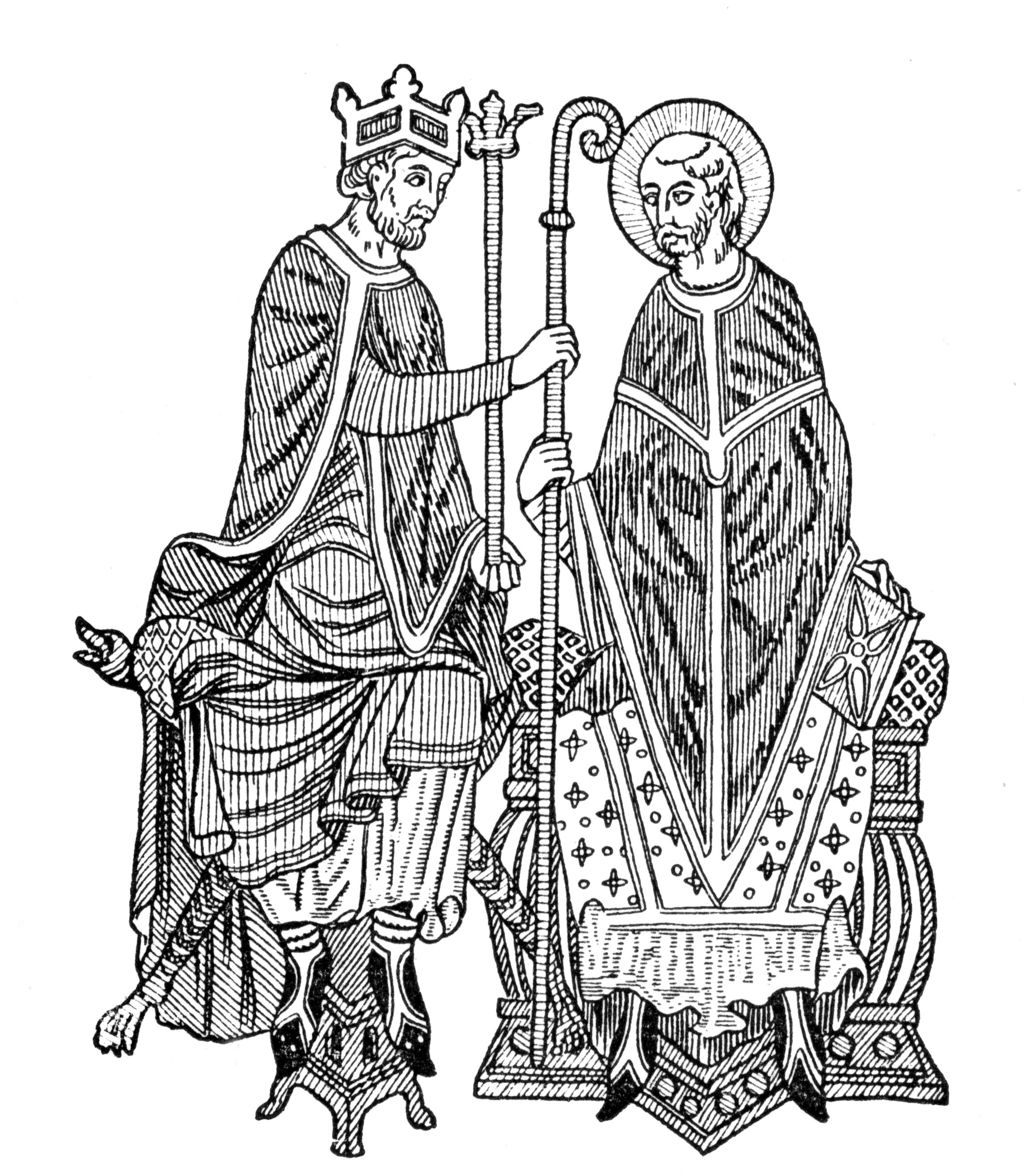
A woodcut illustration of Investiture, or the ceremonial granting of the symbols of an ecclesiastical office, by a king.

John was appointed Bishop of Wells in 1088 by King William II "Rufus", the son and successor to William I. The bishop's consecration was in July, at Canterbury by Archbishop Lanfranc, the Archbishop of Canterbury. He probably owed his appointment to the king's desire to honour his father's physician.

Shortly after his consecration, John bought Bath Abbey's grounds from the king, as well as the city of Bath itself. Whether John paid Rufus for the town or whether he was given the town as a gift by the king is unclear. The abbey had recently lost its abbot, Alfsige, and was, according to Domesday Book, the owner of large estates in and near the town. It would have been the wealth of the abbey that attracted John to take over the monastery. By acquiring the town of Bath, John also acquired the mint that was in the town. In 1090 he transferred the seat, or administration, of the bishopric to Bath Abbey, probably as an attempt to increase the revenues of his see. Bath was a rich abbey, and Wells had always been a poor diocese. By taking over the abbey, John increased his episcopal revenues. William of Malmesbury portrays the moving of the episcopal seat as motivated by a desire for the lands of the abbey, but it was part of a pattern at the time of moving cathedral seats from small villages to larger towns. When John moved his episcopal seat, he also took over the abbey of Bath as his cathedral chapter, turning his diocese into a bishopric served by monks instead of the canons located at Wells that had previously served the diocese.

John rebuilt the monastic church at Bath, which had been damaged during one of Robert de Mowbray's rebellions. As rebuilt, it was only surpassed in size by the cathedrals at Ely, Norwich, and Winchester. The present Bath Cathedral is not the building that John built, and it occupies only a fraction of the space that John's building encompassed. He also reformed the administration of his diocese, setting up archdeacons and organising a court for hearing ecclesiastical cases. His efforts to reform his diocese led to his cathedral chapter's complaining of their treatment, which John seems to have ignored. At Wells, he was accused of destroying the community of canons there, which had been created by his predecessor.

In 1092, John helped with the consecration of Old Sarum Cathedral, although its roof was almost immediately damaged by a storm and required decades of repair. In 1094, he performed the same service for Battle Abbey. After the accession of King Henry I of England, John received a confirmation of the grant of the city of Bath, paying 500 pounds of silver for the verification. In 1102, John secured from King Henry the right to hold fairs at Bath on the feast day of the cathedral's patron saint, Saint Peter. He gave an extensive library to the cathedral at Bath, and eventually the monks there became reconciled to him. John, however, continued to hold most of the old abbey's manors himself, rather than using them for the support of the monks.

== Investiture Controversy ==
John was one of the bishops who sided with King William against Anselm of Canterbury at the king's Whitsun council in 1097, one of the early councils called during the Investiture Controversy in England. During the reign of King Henry I, who succeeded his brother King William in 1100, John, along with Robert Bloet, the Bishop of Lincoln, consecrated abbots who had been invested in office by the king. John attended Anselm's reforming Council of London in 1102, which debated and passed decrees to reform the clergy.

== Death and legacy ==
John died in December 1122 and was buried in Bath Cathedral. He suffered a heart attack after dinner and died suddenly. Traditionally, the date of his death is given as 29 December.

Under John, the monks of Bath became known for their scholarship, although he was not particularly noted for learning. William of Malmesbury claimed he was generous and affable, although the chronicler acknowledged that the bishop treated the canons of Wells abominably. William also recorded that John was a heavy drinker and not given to self-restraint, but that his health was good and he lived to be old. At first, he treated the monks at Bath with contempt and confiscated much of the lands of the abbey for his own use, but in 1106, he restored their lands to them. John's canons of Wells disliked him because he reduced their income and destroyed some of their buildings as part of the movement of the see to Bath. A layman official of the diocese, Hildebert, was probably John's brother; and he held the offices of steward of the diocese and was also the provost of Wells, an inheritable office. John gave much of the revenues of Wells to Hildebert. Another relative, a nephew also named John, was named archdeacon in the diocese.

== Citations ==
Catholic Church titles
Preceded by Gisa	Bishop of Wells; 1088–1090	Succeeded by Himself as Bishop of Bath
Preceded by Himself as Bishop of Wells	Bishop of Bath; 1090–1122	Succeeded by Godfrey
