= Godfrey of Bath =

12th-century Bishop of Bath

- Bishop of Bath
- Appointed: 25 March 1123
- Term ended: 16 August 1135
- Predecessor: John of Tours
- Successor: Robert
- Other post: queen's chaplain

Orders
- Consecration: 26 August 1123 by William de Corbeil

Personal details
- Born: Leuven
- Died: 16 August 1135
- Buried: Bath Abbey

Godfrey (died 1135) was a medieval Bishop of Bath.

== Life ==
Godfrey was a native of Leuven and was chaplain to Adeliza of Louvain, second wife of King Henry I of England. Godfrey served as chaplain both before and after her marriage to the king. He came with her to England when she married Henry I.

Godfrey was nominated 25 March 1123, and consecrated 26 August 1123 by Archbishop William de Corbeil of Canterbury at St. Paul's London. During the last years of King Henry I's rule, Godfrey was often at the king's court and received a number of charters from the king.

Godfrey died on 16 August 1135 and was buried in Bath Abbey near the north altar.

== Citations ==
Catholic Church titles
Preceded by John of Tours	Bishop of Bath; 1123–1135	Succeeded by Robert
