= Halenald de Bidun =

12th-century Breton nobleman in England

Halenald de Bidun or Halneth de Bidun was a Breton who held land in England during the reigns of King Henry I and Stephen.

Halenald was from either Bidon or La Ville-Bidon, two locations in the Dol region of Brittany. By the late 1120s, he was overlord of a group of manors around Lavendon in Buckinghamshire. The lands were held in 1086 by William, who was the chamberlain of Geoffrey de Montbray, the Bishop of Coutances, when they were recorded in the Domesday Book as William's. The historian I. J. Sanders considered the honour of Lavendon as probably an English feudal barony, which if true would make Halenald the Baron of Lavendon.

Halenald gave gifts to Thornton Abbey in Lincolnshire and later became a monk at St Andrews Priory in Northampton.

Halenald married twice – first to Sara, who was the mother of his son John, who was his heir. His second wife was Agnes, but while the Complete Peerage states that she was the daughter of Pain fitzJohn and his wife Sybil and that she had previously been the wife of Warin de Munchensy. However, Katharine Keats-Rohan concluded the chronology of this reconstruction was faulty and instead sees Agnes, daughter of John fitzPayn as the wife of a younger Halenald de Bidun, the elder Halenald's son, while attributing unknown parentage to the latter's second wife Agnes. Halenald the elder had sons John, Simon, Halenald, Trihan, Walter, and Alfred. Walter is described as a "clerk", or a member of the clergy, and Alfred is described as a priest. Walter de Bidun became the chancellor of Scotland and was Bishop of Dunkeld-elect right before his death. Halenald had at least one daughter, Amicia and perhaps another named Matilda, who may have been the daughter of John de Bidun, however. Besides John, it is not clear which of his wives was the mother of his various children. Halenald died after 1156, and his widow survived him. Amicia married Gerard de Limesi, and Matilda married Walchelin Visdeloup, and was a widow in 1185.
