= Warin de Munchensy =

12th-century Anglo-Norman nobleman

Warin de Munchensy was an Anglo-Norman nobleman in 12th-century England.

Warin was the younger son of Hubert de Munchensy, lord of Edwardstone in Suffolk. It is not clear who his mother was as his father married twice—first to a woman who was possibly an heiress to Godric, the dapifer of Henry I of England and second to Muriel, daughter of Piers de Valoignes.

Around 1151 Warin witnessed the foundation charter of Old Buckenham Priory with his brother Hubert.

Warin married Agnes, daughter of Pain fitzJohn and his wife Sybil. Through his wife, Warin inherited lands previously held by the de Lacy and Talbot families, and these lands were considered by George Cokayne as the barony of Munchensy. I. J. Sanders, in his work on English feudal baronies argues that it was a probable barony, and names it as the barony of Swanscombe, centered on Swanscombe in Kent.

Warin died either in 1162 or before that, as his widow was married to Haldenald de Bidun in that year. She was once more a widow in 1185, when her sons were given as Ralph de Munchensy, William de Munchensy and Hubert de Munchensy. Ralph and William were laymen but Hubert was a member of the clergy. Agnes died around 1190 or 1191. William was the heir to the probable barony of Swanscombe.
