= Geoffrey Talbot (died 1129) =

12th-century Anglo-Norman baron

- Died: around 1129
- Other name: Geoffrey I Talbot
- Occupation: Baron
- Spouse: Agnes
- Children: Geoffrey Talbot; Sybil

Geoffrey Talbot (sometimes Geoffrey I Talbot; died c. 1129) was an Anglo-Norman nobleman in medieval England. Holding lands around Swanscombe in Kent, he is often considered to have been the feudal baron of Swanscombe. Besides his lands, he was also given custody of Rochester Castle. His heir was his son, also named Geoffrey.

== Career ==
Talbot held lands around Swanscombe, Kent which had been held in 1086 in the Domesday Book by Helto Dapifer, a follower of Odo of Bayeux. Talbot is recorded as the holder of these lands in the 1166 Cartae Baronum, which states that Talbot had the lands some time before his death. (Note: Who held the lands after Odo's forfeiture of his lands in 1088 is unknown.) The Cartae records that the lands around Swanscombe were assessed as owing 20 knight's fees. These holdings around Swanscombe are considered by some historians as probably comprising a feudal barony.

Sometime after 1086 Talbot held lands of the bishops of Rochester also, and around 1100 to 1103 was given control of Rochester Castle by Gundulf of Rochester, who was then the bishop. Talbot may be the same as a Geoffrey Talbot who held lands in Normandy at Cleuville from the Giffards and another estate at Sainte-Croix-sur Buchy near Rouen. For his lands in Kent, Talbot owed castle-guard at Dover Castle.

== Family and legacy ==
Talbot married Agnes, who survived him and owed two marks to the king for the right to take control of her dower lands. The family of Agnes is unclear, with David Crouch stating she was a member of the de Lacy family, and the Complete Peerage averring she was probably the daughter of Walter de Lacy and Emma, and sister of Roger and Hugh de Lacy. Katharine Keats-Rohan, however, posits that Agnes was probably the daughter of Helto Dapifer.

Talbot's heir was his son, Geoffrey Talbot, who came into control of his father's lands in 1129. Talbot and Agnes also had a daughter named Sybil, who appears on a grant of lands to Colchester. There may have been another daughter, as the Agnes who married Hugh de Lacy who died around 1115 was probably a daughter of Talbot. Besides the grant witnessed by Sybil, Talbot and Agnes also granted the advowson of a church at Thorington in Essex to Colchester.
