= Josce de Dinan =

12th-century Anglo-Norman landholder in England

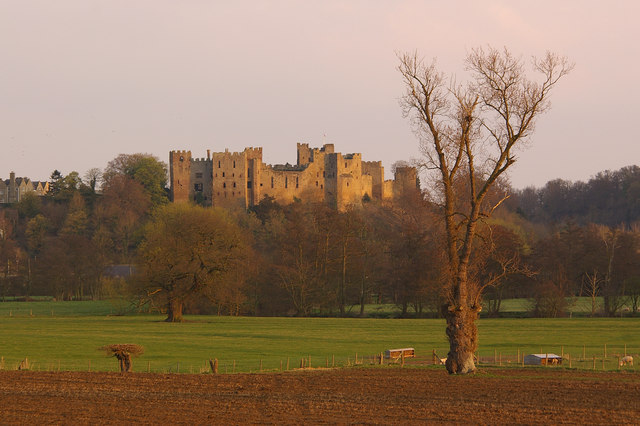
Modern view of the ruins of Ludlow Castle, which was once controlled by Josce

Josce de Dinan (Note: Sometimes known as Joce de Dinan, Josselin de Dinan, Joce de Dynan; Jocelin de Dinan, Joyce de Dinan, or Joceas de Dinan.) (died 1166) was an Anglo-Norman nobleman who lived during and after the civil war between King Stephen of England and his cousin Matilda over the throne of England. He was a landholder in the Welsh Marches when he was married by Stephen to the widow of Pain fitzJohn, a union that gave Josce control of Ludlow Castle. Control of the castle was contested by other noblemen, and the resulting warfare between the nobles forms the background to a late medieval romance known as Fouke le Fitz Waryn, which is mainly concerned with the actions of Josce's grandson, but also includes material on Josce's lifetime. Josce eventually lost control of Ludlow and was granted lands in compensation by Matilda and her son, King Henry II of England, who succeeded Stephen in 1154.

== Background and early life ==
Following King Henry I's death in 1135, the succession was disputed between the king's nephews—Stephen and his elder brother, Theobald II, Count of Champagne—and Henry's surviving legitimate child Matilda, usually known as the Empress Matilda because of her first marriage to the Holy Roman Emperor, Henry V. King Henry's only legitimate son, William, had died in 1120. After Matilda was widowed in 1125, she returned to her father, who married her to Geoffrey, Count of Anjou.

All the magnates of England and Normandy were required to declare fealty to Matilda as Henry's heir, but after the king's death in 1135, Stephen rushed to England and had himself crowned before either Theobald or Matilda could react. The Norman barons accepted Stephen as Duke of Normandy, and Theobald contented himself with his possessions in France.

But Matilda was less sanguine, and secured the support of her maternal uncle, the Scottish king David I, and in 1138 also that of her half-brother Robert, Earl of Gloucester, an illegitimate son of Henry I. (Note: Henry I had more than 20 illegitimate children.) Nobles in the Welsh Marches revolted against Stephen in 1136, but the revolt was not settled until 1138. In 1139, Matilda invaded southern England with her half-brother's support, and the period of civil war began.

Josce was the youngest son of Geoffrey de Dinan and Radegonde Orieldis, and had two older brothers, Oliver of Dinan and Alan of Becherel. Josce's family was from Brittany, and he was described by the historian Marjorie Chibnall as an "obscure Breton adventurer".

Josce moved from Devon in southern England to the Welsh Marches, the border between England and Wales, because the lords of Monmouth were also of Breton extraction. While in the Marches, he joined King Stephen's household.

== Ludlow Castle ==
Josce was married to Sybil, the widow of Pain fitzJohn. Pain died in 1137, and Sybil held Ludlow Castle against Stephen in 1139, but surrendered after a siege. Ludlow was an important strategic stronghold for control of the Welsh Borders, and Stephen decided to marry Pain's widow to someone he felt was trustworthy. Upon his marriage Josce also acquired control of the castle, built in the late 11th century. (Note: A bridge located near Ludlow Castle is named Dinham Bridge, and this is often erroneously held to have been named after Josce. The poem Fouke le Fitz Waryn claims the town now known as Ludlow was called Dinham "for a very long time". The derivation of "Dinham" is uncertain, and it has been suggested that the word may be Saxon in origin, though it is possible the town adopted the name from Josce de Dinan.) Josce probably also received many of the de Lacy family's holdings in southern Shropshire, but he rebelled against Stephen and fortified Ludlow against the king. Josce's position was so strong that when Stephen granted much of the surrounding lands to Robert de Beaumont, Earl of Leicester, Ludlow was specifically exempted. Stephen told Robert that he would have a royal grant of the castle if he could secure Josce's submission as a vassal.

Custody of Ludlow was contested not only by Stephen but also by Gilbert de Lacy, whose efforts to wrest the castle from Josce are the background to the medieval romance Fouke le Fitz Waryn; the extant prose version dates from the 14th century, but it was originally a 13th-century poem, now lost. Gilbert claimed the castle through his familial link with Sybil, fitzJohn's widow, who was a member of the de Lacy family. Others trying to take Ludlow were Hugh de Mortimer and Gilbert de Lacy. According to the Chronicle of Wigmore Abbey, some time after September 1148 (Note: The date is determined by the elevation of Gilbert Foliot as Bishop of Hereford, which took place in September 1148.) Mortimer and Josce became embroiled in a private war, during which Josce seized Mortimer while the latter was travelling. Josce imprisoned his captive in Ludlow and demanded a ransom of 3,000 silver marks, as well as, according to the Chronicle, Mortimer's "plate, his horses, and his birds". (Note: Plate in this would refer to his eating utensils, usually made of silver or other precious metals. His birds here would have referred to his hawks or falcons used in falconry.) Presumably, Mortimer met the ransom, as he is later known to have been a free man.

While Josce was absent from Ludlow, Gilbert de Lacy was able to take the castle. Josce laid siege to the castle but was unsuccessful in his attempt to retake it, and retreated to Lambourn with his military forces. Although the exact date of this event is unknown, it appears to have been sometime around 1150 or shortly before. Matilda gave Josce some lands around Lambourn after Ludlow's fall as compensation. Later he was given land in Berkshire by King Henry II (became king in 1154), Matilda's son, as further recompense for the loss of Ludlow. In 1156 Josce held lands in Berkshire, Wiltshire, Hampshire, Devonshire and Somerset. These holdings included the manor of Lambourn, worth £76 in income per year, as well as the manor of Stanton (now known as Stanton Fitzwarren in Wiltshire) in addition to the lands scattered in other counties.

Josce's grandson Fulk fitzWarin, who died in 1258, is ostensibly the hero of a lost romantic poem called Fouke le Fitz Waryn. The work survives as French prose in a loose corpus of medieval literature known as the Matter of England. However, it appears to confuse events of Fulk fitzWarin's lifetime with those of his grandfather's. Other errors in the work include transposing some of the Welsh Marcher barons of King Henry I of England's reign into nobles of William the Conqueror's time, and omitting an entire generation of fitzWarins. Although scholars believe Fouke le Fitz Waryn draws on genuine tradition, the difficulty in separating the fitzWarin biographies makes it a problematic source.

== Family ==
Josce died in 1166. He was survived by two daughters: Sibil, who married Hugh de Pulgenet and died in 1212, and Hawise who married Fulk fitzWarin, who died in 1197. In 1199, his two daughters petitioned the king regarding the ownership of the town and castle of Ludlow, but were turned down.
