= Roger de Lacy =

Anglo-Norman nobleman

Arms of de Lacy: Or a lion rampant purpure

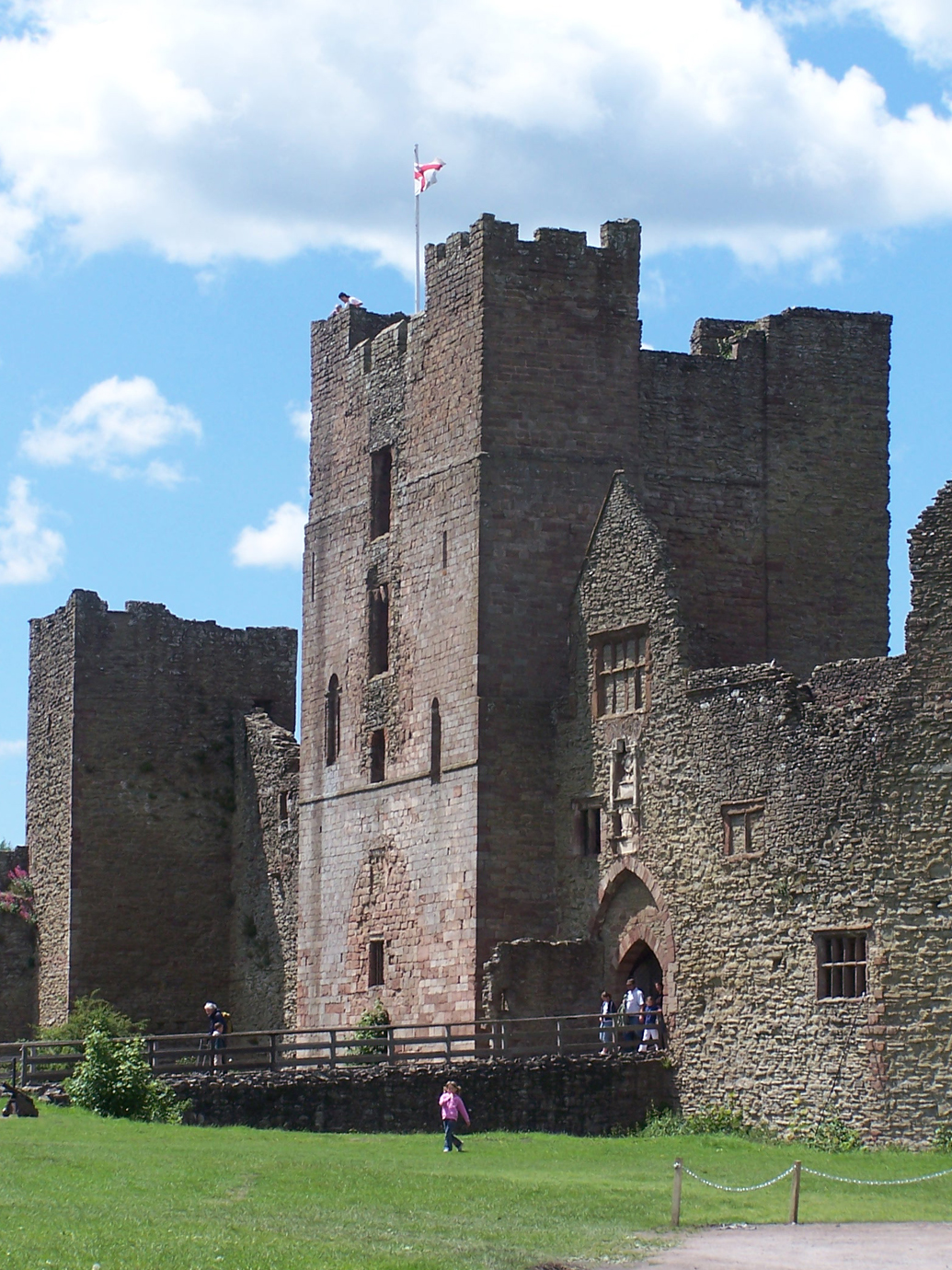
The entrance (right) to the inner bailey of Ludlow Castle, next to the keep (left). What is now the inner bailey marks the limit of the Norman castle.

Roger de Lacy (died after 1106) was an Anglo-Norman nobleman, a Marcher Lord on the Welsh border. Roger was a castle builder, especially at Ludlow Castle.

== Lands and titles ==
From his father, Walter de Lacy, Roger inherited Castle Frome, Herefordshire. The Domesday Survey (1086) shows Roger holding also Ocle Pychard, Almeley Castle, Eardisley Castle, Icomb Place and Edgeworth Manor. He had an insecure lordship at Ewias Lacy now known as Longtown Castle on the modern day Welsh border., in Longtown, Herefordshire; Stanton Lacy was probably also his after Walter. His main stronghold was Weobley. He held directly from the King. De Lacy also held 1.5 salthouses in Droitwich.

== Rebel Baron ==
Roger took part in the rebellion of 1088 against William Rufus, with the other local lords Osbern fitzRichard of Richard's Castle, Ralf of Mortemer, and Bernard of Neufmarche. He was later implicated in the conspiracy of 1095 against William and was exiled.

== Legacy of family conflict ==
Weobley passed to Roger's brother Hugh de Lacy, who died before 1115, when the de Lacy lands passed to Pain fitzJohn. Roger's son Gilbert de Lacy spent much effort recovering the Longtown and Ludlow holdings.

== Bibliography ==
- Fleming, Robin (2003). Domesday Book and the Law: Society and Legal Custom in Early Medieval England. Cambridge University Press. ISBN 978-0-521-52846-7.
- Remfry, P. M., Longtown Castle, 1048 to 1241 (ISBN 1-899376-29-1)
- Remfry, P. M., The Castles of Ewias Lacy, 1048 to 1403 (ISBN 1-899376-37-2)
