= Gesta Stephani =

12th-century Medieval English chronicle

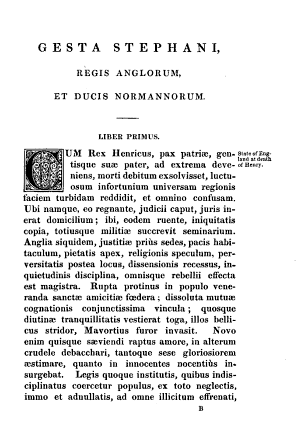
Gesta Stephani, from Sewell's edition, 1846

Deeds of King Stephen or Acts of Stephen or Gesta Regis Stephani is a mid-12th-century English history by an anonymous author about King Stephen of England and his struggles with his cousin Empress Matilda. It is one of the main sources for this period in the history of England.

Some historians think the author may have been Robert of Bath (also known as Robert of Lewes), Bishop of Bath from 1136 to 1166.

The Gesta Stephani was first published in Paris in 1619, from a manuscript in the episcopal library at Laon which was subsequently lost. A fuller manuscript was found in the 20th century, and since published, in the Municipal Library at Valenciennes, having been transferred from the nearby abbey of Vicoigne. The Latin text tells in 120 chapters of the Anarchy of King Stephen's reign, and ends with the accession of King Henry II.

== Background and authorship ==
The Gesta Stephani was written in two books. The historian R. H. C. Davis believes that the first book, which covers the first twelve years of Stephen's reign (1135–1147), was written in about 1148, while the second book, taken up to the accession of Henry II, was written after 1153. Davis examined the places named in the texts and found that most of them were in the South-West of England; unusually detailed descriptions of Bristol and Bath, as well as scornful comments about the former, suggest that the author may have been writing in or near Bath. This contrasts with an earlier statement by K.R. Potter that there is "no clear indication of any local attachment". However, Davis points out that comparisons with the chronicles of other writers based elsewhere in the country reveal considerable south-west bias in the Gesta, which had been overlooked by historians who compared it only with the account of William of Malmesbury, who was also writing in the south-west.

The authorship of the Gesta is not known. According to Richard Howlett, writing in 1886, the author was not from a monastery, and Davis agreed with this in his analysis of the author, because, while he does show a local bias, the author's knowledge of Exeter, London, Pevensey and Bedford all show that he was someone who travelled. Nonetheless, they were not an itinerant, and the author's writing reveals little knowledge of the north or East of England or the leading baronial families in those parts of the kingdom, while they placed too much emphasis on the exploits of relatively minor barons associated with the south west, including the de Tracy family. The writer appears to have been a scholar, and their work omits dates and extraneous detail for the sake of literary effect, while employing classical terms to offices and positions rather than their Mediaeval Latin equivalents. Scholars agree that the author was a supporter of Henry of Blois, Bishop of Winchester. However, historians differ over their exact relationship: Howlett suggested the author was Henry's chaplain, but Davis believes that the criticism of Henry contained in the Gesta makes this unlikely. Davis instead suggests that the author was a bishop, based on the style of writing, perspectives on the events mentioned in the chronicle, and the places the author visited; he goes further to speculate that it may have been Robert of Lewes, Bishop of Bath, who was the author. Robert Bartlett states that he was "perhaps" the author and Richard Huscroft writes that it was written either by him "or someone close to him".

== Manuscripts ==
Two manuscripts of the Gesta Stephani have been known to scholars, but one is now lost. The first, housed in the episcopal library at Laon, was printed in the seventeenth century, but subsequently disappeared. It stopped at 1147, was damaged, with some pages illegible, and included gaps in the text. The second manuscript was discovered in the Municipal Library at Valenciennes and was originally from the Abbey of Vicoigne; it includes all of the original manuscript's content, but carries on the work until the end of Stephen's reign and is legible where the original one was damaged. It contains the same four gaps as the first but, where pages appear to be missing in the first, the second manuscript includes gaps in the text, which leads R. A. B. Mynors to suggest that second was copied from the first.

== Publication ==
A manuscript of the Gesta Stephani was discovered in the libraries of the bishop of Laon in the early seventeenth century, and was first printed in 1619 at Paris by the French historian André Duchesne (1584–1640) in Historia Normannorum Scriptores Antiqui. (Note: This work includes the manuscript transcription of the Gesta Stephani, printed in full from pp. 926–975.) It was incomplete at that time, (Note: There were four gaps in the text, the end of Book II had fallen out and some of the pages were damaged to the point of illegibility.) and was lost after Duchesne's death. This text was reprinted in England by R.C. Sewell (1803–1864) in 1846 and by Richard Howlett (1841–1917) in 1886; the latter has been praised for its improvements to Duchesne's version and its useful preface. There have been two translations of the work into English, the first being by Thomas Forester in Henry of Huntingdon in 1853 and then second by Joseph Stevenson (1806–1895) in The Church Historians of England in 1858.

Another manuscript was discovered in the Municipal Library, Valenciennes, by Professor R.A.B. Mynors (1903–1989), who found it included with a version of the Gesta Regum by William of Malmesbury, catalogued in the library as MS 792. This new text continued the history of Stephen's reign up to 1154 and filled in the damaged passages which Duchesne was unable to transcribe. In 1955, this version was translated by K.R. Potter and published by Nelson's Mediaeval Texts, with an essay assessing it written by Dr A.L. Poole (1889–1963). It was reprinted in 1976 by Oxford University Press and included a new introduction by R.H.C. Davis (1918–1991), with contributions by Mynors.

=== Editions ===
- Duchesne, André, ed. (1619). Historia Normannorum Scriptores Antiqui. Paris. OCLC 461091103.
- Sewell, Richard Clarke, ed. (1846). Gesta Stephani. London: English Historical Society. OCLC 2200275.
- Forester, Thomas, ed. (trans.) (1853). The Chronicle of Henry of Huntingdon ... also, the Acts of King Stephen. London: Henry G. Bohn. OCLC 16745036.
- Howlett, Richard, ed. (1886). Chronicles of the Reigns of Stephen, Henry II and Richard I. Rolls series, iii.
- Potter, K.R. (trans.), ed. (1955). Gesta Stephani. London: Thomas Nelson & Sons. OCLC 504607315.
- Potter, K.R. (trans.), ed., Davis, R.H.C. (intro.) (1976). Gesta Stephani. Oxford: Oxford University Press. ISBN 0-19-822234-3.

== Contents ==
=== Gender ===
The author of the Gesta Stephani uses gender as a way to criticise. Men who changes sides in the war to support Matilda instead of Stephen are described in the Gesta Stephani as effeminate. The Gesta Stephani also criticises the Empress Matilda for not behaving in a feminine way. While medieval kings could were legitimately expected by society to express anger or displeasure, the author uses different terms to describe similar emotions when displayed by Matilda and to delegitimise her as ruler. The writer also creates a contrast between the Empress Matilda and the Queen Matilda, Stephen's wife. The queen is praised for her feminine qualities and masculine qualities that the author of the Gesta Stephani thought suitable for a queen. The historian Katherine Weikert describes the contrast between the two women as "The queen acts as a queen, and the empress attempts to act like a king".

== See also ==
- English historians in the Middle Ages
