= Fouke le Fitz Waryn =

Chivalric romance about the English baron Fulk III FitzWarin

Fouke le Fitz Waryn is a chivalric romance about the English baron Fulk III FitzWarin, written during the later 13th century, when the actual events of Fulk's life were still in living memory or common report. Probably originally composed in Old French verse, it survives only in an early 14th-century French prose version in a single manuscript in the Royal manuscripts, British Library, which is thought to follow the lost verse quite closely. The 16th-century antiquary John Leland saw and briefly described the French verse version, and made an extended abstract from a Middle English verse version called The Nobile Actes of the Guarines, the original of which is also lost. Various contemporary references show that the tale was widely-known in the later Middle Ages.

In recent years the work has proved a fruitful and versatile resource for the speculative analysis of its themes and its representation of literary archetypes. The Fouke le Fitz Waryn narrative, while constructed around historical events and factual or quasi-factual information, is not a fully historical account. It cultivates the literary and social preoccupations and heroic landscapes of its age, and is consciously absorbed within the framework of legendary and folkloric themes which are sometimes referred to as the "Matter of England". That term should not deflect the recognition that the literary and cultural, as well as the geographical, landscape which the real Fulk inhabited was equally English and Welsh in outlook, as it was also French and Latin in language.

About one-third of the text sets up the historical backdrop to Fulk's life, through his father and grandfather FitzWarin (who merge into one figure) and his grandfather Josce de Dinan, their relations with the Peverels during the Anarchy, and the confrontations of the English and Welsh rulers. Themes of outlawry, dispossession and restitution, adventure and occasional piety surround the main subject, culminating in Fulk's second marriage, blindness, death, and burial at Alberbury. Its tales of mysterious lands, imprisoned maidens, prophecies and similarly allegorical or chivalric material are instructive in the operations of the romance idiom. Some episodes have been compared to elements of the Robin Hood legends.

== Editions ==
- F. Michel (ed.), Histoire de Foulques Fitz-Warin, d'après un Manuscrit du Musée Britannique (Silvestre Libraire, Paris 1840). (Google) (Edition without translation, but includes the Leland abstracts).
- T. Wright (ed. and translator), The History of Fulk FitzWarin, an Outlawed Baron, in the Reign of King John, edited from a manuscript preserved in the British Museum, with an English translation and illustrative notes (Printed for the Warton Club, London, 1855). at pp. 1–183 text, pp. 183–231 notes.
- J. Stephenson (ed. and translator), 'The Legend of Fulk FitzWarin' (parallel French text and English translation), in Rerum Britannicarum Medii Aevi Scriptores, Rolls Series Vol. 66: Radulphi de Coggeshall Chronicon Anglicanum (etc.) (Longman & Co., Trübner & Co., London 1875), at pp. 277–415 (Google).
- A.C. Wood (ed.), Fulk Fitz-Warin. Text, and a Study of the Language (Blades, East and Blades, London 1911).
- L. Brandin (ed.), Fouke Fitz Warin, Les Classiques françaises du Moyen Age (Paris 1930).
- E.J. Hathaway (ed.), Fouke le Fitz Waryn, Anglo-Norman Text Society (Basil Blackwell, Oxford 1976).
