= Walter de Lacy, Lord of Weobley and Ludlow =

11th-century Anglo-Norman baron in England

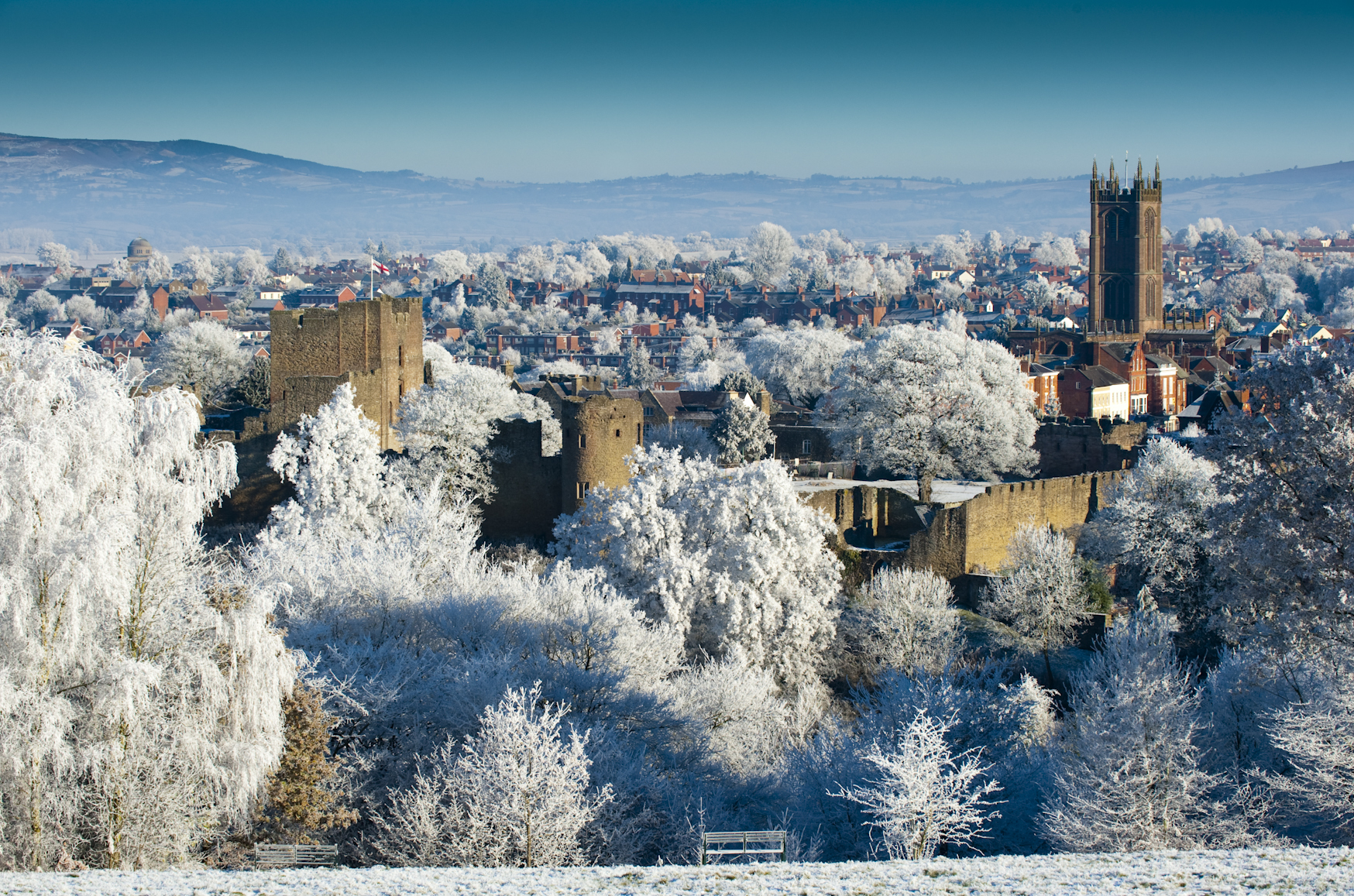
A winter scene of modern-day Ludlow, which was a centre of de Lacy's lands.

Walter de Lacy (died 27 March 1085) was a Norman nobleman who went to England after the Norman Conquest of England in 1066. He received lands in Herefordshire and Shropshire, and served King William I of England by leading military forces during 1075. He died in 1085 and one son inherited his lands. Another son became an abbot.

== Early life ==
Walter was originally from Lassy, in Normandy. He had a brother, Ilbert de Lacy. Ilbert was the ancestor of the de Lacy family of Pontefract. Both Walter and Ilbert jointly held the Norman lands that were held of the Bishop of Bayeux.

== Career in England ==
Walter was given the lordship of Weobley in Herefordshire after the Conquest. He is already attested in the Welsh Marches by 1069, when he is recorded stopping a Welsh attack and then raiding into Wales in retribution. Walter and Ilbert may have come to England in the household of Odo of Bayeux, the Bishop of Bayeux and half-brother of King William the Conqueror. Although some historians, such as W. E. Wightman, have argued that Walter was a follower of William fitzOsbern, others, including C. P. Lewis and K. S. B. Keats-Rohan, have argued that Walter was an independent agent in England.

By the time of Walter's death, he held a block of lands in Herefordshire along the border with Wales. Another group of lands was centered on Ludlow in Shropshire. These two groupings of lands allowed Walter to help defend the border of England against Welsh raids. Walter also had other lands in Berkshire, Gloucestershire, Worcestershire, and Oxfordshire. Walter kept a large number of his manors in demesne, managing them directly rather than giving them as fiefs to his knightly followers. Some of these lands in Hereford, including Holme Lacy, were held of the Bishop of Hereford through feudal tenure. In total, Domesday Book records Walter's lands as being worth £423 in income per year and as comprising 163 manors in 7 different counties. He was one of 21 individuals with land valued at more than £400 at the time of the survey.

In 1075, Walter was one of the leaders of the force that prevented Roger de Breteuil from joining up with the other rebels during the Revolt of the Earls. Walter had joined forces with Wulfstan the Bishop of Worcester, Æthelwig the Abbot of Evesham Abbey, and Urse d'Abetot the Sheriff of Worcester.

== Family and death ==
Walter married Emma or Emmelina – though some sources report these as successive wives, they probably are alternative renderings of the same wife's name. They had three sons, Roger, Hugh and Walter. Roger was the heir to Weobley and Walter became Abbot of Gloucester Abbey. Walter and Emma also had a daughter who became a nun at St Mary's Abbey, Winchester. A niece was married to Ansfrid de Cormeilles. Considerable confusion exists about Sybil, the wife of Pain fitzJohn. C. P. Lewis names her as the daughter of Walter, but W. E. Wightman calls her the daughter of Hugh, Walter's son. Yet another reconstruction, favoured by Bruce Coplestone-Crow, sees her as child of Geoffrey Talbot and his wife Agnes, whom he sees as daughter of Walter de Lacy.

The elder Walter died on 27 March 1085, falling off scaffolding at Saint Guthlac's Priory when he was inspecting the progress of the building at that monastery. He was buried in the chapter house at Gloucester Abbey. He was a benefactor to Gloucester Abbey, as well as Saint Guthlac's.
