= Chapel of St Mary Magdalene, Ludlow =

Ruined castle chapel in Shropshire, England

Chapel of St Mary Magdalene (Ludlow)
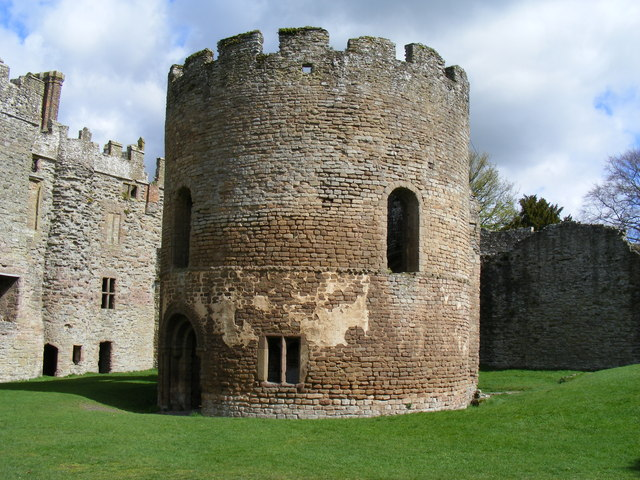
- Chapel of St Mary Magdalene (Ludlow)
- Chapel of St Mary Magdalene (Ludlow)
- 52°22′03″N 2°43′24″W
- OS grid reference: SO 50865 74597
- Location: Ludlow, Shropshire
- Country: England

Architecture
- Heritage designation: Grade I listed
- Style: Norman
- Years built: c. 1150

The Chapel of St Mary Magdalene is a Grade I listed ruined Norman chapel located inside the inner bailey of Ludlow Castle, Shropshire, England. It is notable for its Norman Doorway, and was partially restored in 2018.

== History ==
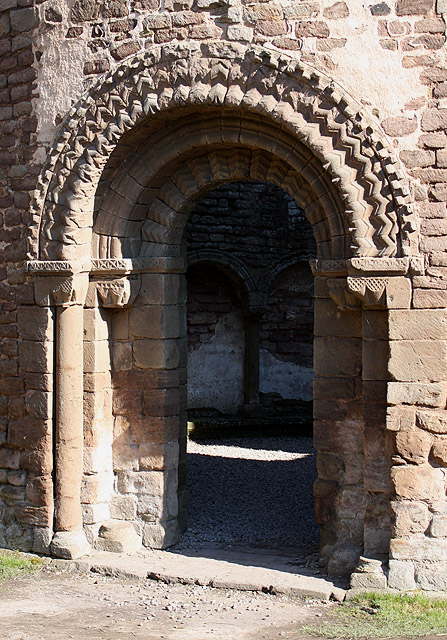
Norman doorway, Round Chapel, Ludlow Castle

The Chapel of St Mary Magdalene dates from the 12th century and is a rare survivor of a church with a round nave. The chancel, which does not survive (though its remains are visible), was rectangular. The chapel was built in the first half of the 12th Century, most likely by Gilbert de Lacy.

The chapel was remodelled in the early 16th Century, most likely around 1502 for the installation of the eldest son of King Henry VII, Arthur, Prince of Wales.

Over many centuries, like Ludlow Castle, the chapel fell into ruin. The ruins underwent extensive restoration in 2018; a new roof was installed, and the chapel today serves as a wedding venue. Much of the original Norman carving survives, including the arches of the door openings, as well as a variety of capitals and moulded arches.

== See also ==
- Grade I listed buildings in Shropshire
- Ludlow, Shropshire
