= Church of St Deinst, Llangarron =

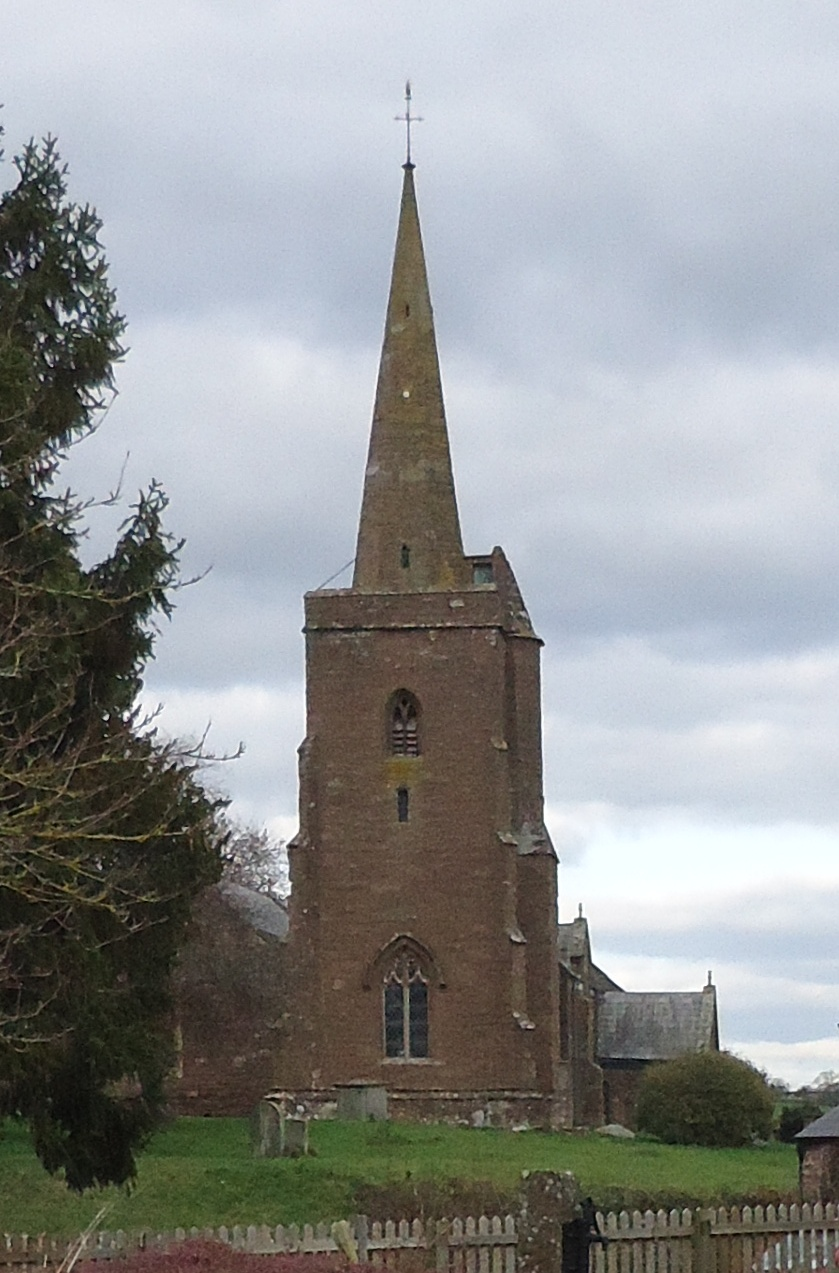

- Location in Herefordshire
- 51.8871°N 2.6838°W
- Location: Llangarron, Herefordshire
- Country: England
- Denomination: Church of England
- Website: Llangarron, St Deinst's Church

History
- Status: parish church
- Dedication: St Deiniol

Architecture
- Functional status: Active
- Heritage designation: Grade I listed
- Designated: 26 February 1966

Specifications
- Materials: Red sandstone ashlar and rubble masonry

Administration
- Province: Canterbury
- Diocese: Diocese of Hereford
- Parish: Llangarron

Clergy
- Vicar: Revd Ben Bentham

The Church of St Deinst, Llangarron, Herefordshire is a church of the Diocese of Hereford, England. The church is dedicated to the Celtic saint Deiniol and is the only church in England to bear such a dedication. It is an active parish church and a Grade I listed building.

== History ==
St Deiniol was a 6th century Celtic ecclesiastic, traditionally recorded as the first Bishop of Bangor. His name is variously rendered as Denoual, Deinst, and Daniel. Church dedications to the saint are rare, St Deinst's in Llangarron being the only such occurrence in England. (Note: Four dedications to St Deiniol exist in Wales, at Marchwiel, at Willington Worthenbury, and at Hawarden in the north of the country, and at Itton in the south.) The origins of the church at Llangarron were as a possession of Monmouth Priory. The present structure was mostly constructed in the 14th century, with restorations in the 19th and early 20th centuries. The 14th century work was probably a reconstruction of an earlier wooden church, dating from the 11th century. The later restorations were undertaken by George Pearson in 1841 and by John Pollard Seddon in 1900–1901.

The church remains an active parish church in the Diocese of Hereford. Refurbishment of the building took place in 2009, supported by a grant from the National Churches Trust. The redevelopment included the construction of a community hub, the Garron Centre.

The church is part of 'The Borders Group of Parishes'. The benefice comprises Goodrich with Welsh Bicknor, Marstow, Llangarron, Llangrove and Welsh Newton with Llanrothal.

In recent years the church has held a number of concerts, including a Baroque Concert "The Am’rous Flute", Hereford Concert Band who performed the Big Band sound, Chepstow Male Voice Choir, the Charles Medlam viola da gamba lunchtime recital and the Liberty Street Jazz Band. In 2010 the church was the venue for a Medieval Mystery Play.

== Architecture and description ==
The church is built of Old Red Sandstone, in part carved ashlar and in part rubble infill. The building comprises a nave, chancel, and a tower with an external stair turret. The style is Perpendicular Gothic. Alan Brooks, in his 2012 Herefordshire Pevsner, notes the "substantial" font and the Jacobean pulpit. The 14th-century font is octagonal in shape and perpendicular in design, with carved quatrefoils, tracery and fleurons.

The church contains an early carving, originally thought to be medieval tombstone commemorating a child, but also believed to be Romano-British in date. (Note: Pevsner doubts the earlier dating, ascribing the carving to the 14th century.) It is possibly a depiction of Deiniol.

== Listing designations ==
The church is a Grade I listed building. The interior, and the churchyard, contain an unusually large number of listed memorials, all designated Grade II. These include memorials to: Edward Tovey, Richard Knight, Silvaus Taner, the Mathews family, and two named family members, James and William, Edward, Benjamin, and William, all of the Watkins family, the Godwin family, Kate Hartland, Edmund Miles, Hannah Smith, Thomas and Elizabeth Smith, Thomas Wood, two memorials to members of the Woodward family, the Jones family, Walter and Mary Mayos, Mary Miles, Mary Philpotts, Mary Evans, another Mary Evans, Mary Williams, Thomas Carrier, Edward Taylor, two members of the Peake family, and the Gunters.

Other Grade II structures include a sundial which originally formed the tip of the spire and which was removed and reconfigured by Seddon, and three unidentified chest tombs.

== Gallery ==
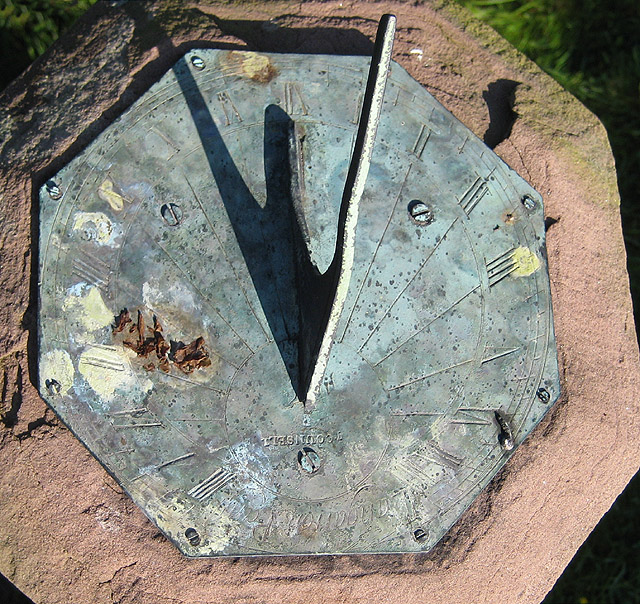
Sundial on top of the former spire finial

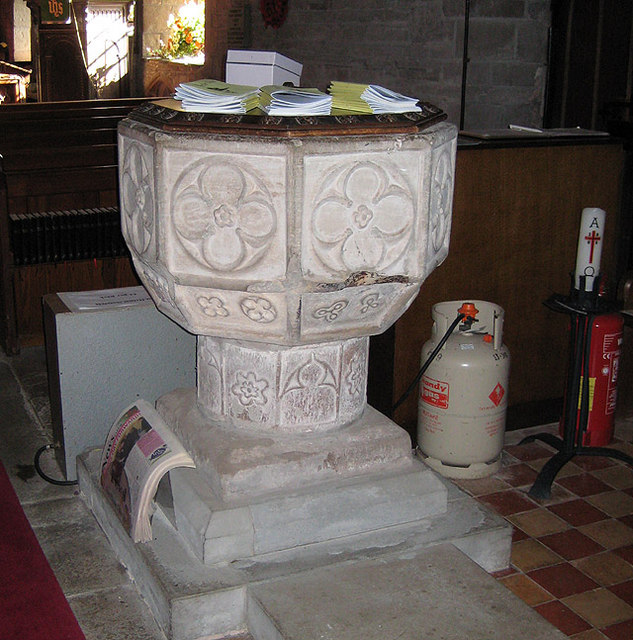
The 14th-century baptismal font

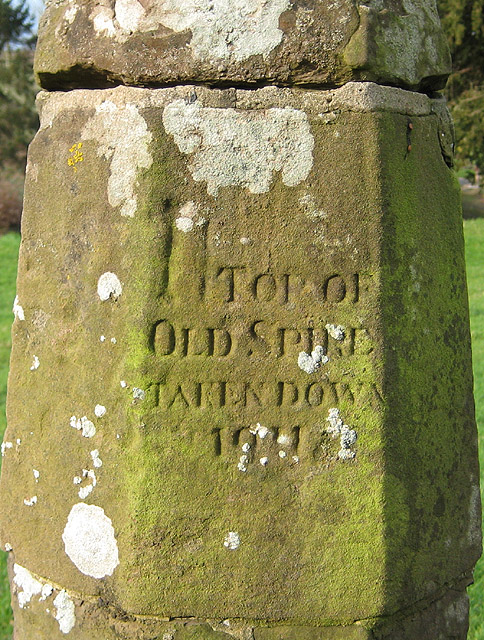
Top of the former spire

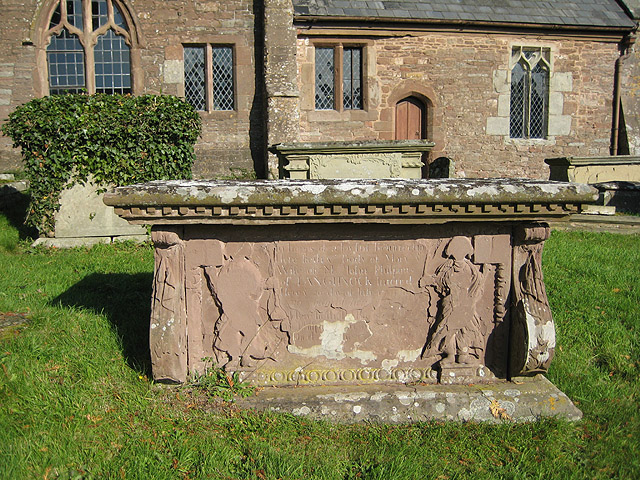
Chest tomb in the churchyard

== Sources ==
- Brooks, Alan; Pevsner, Nikolaus (2012). Herefordshire. The Buildings of England. Yale University Press. ISBN 978-0-300-12575-7.
