= St Wonnow's Church, Wonastow =

St Wonnow, Wonastow
- St Wonnow, Wonastow
- St Wonnow, Wonastow
- 51°47′36.29″N 2°44′49.75″W
- Location: Monmouth, Monmouthshire
- Country: Wales
- Denomination: Church in Wales
- Website: monmouthparishes.org

Administration
- Diocese: Monmouth

Clergy
- Vicar: Rev David McGladdery

The Church of St Wonnow is the parish church of Wonastow, a small rural village 2 miles (3.2 km) south-west of Monmouth, south east Wales. It is a Grade II* listed building.

== History and architecture ==
St Wonnows derives its name from Saint Wonnow or Winwaloe, a sixth-century saint in Brittany, whose cult was probably brought to Britain by Saint Gwenhael, his successor as abbot of Landévennec. The first church at Wonastow is thought to have been built in the seventh century, when Cynfwr ap Iago gave the church and village to the Diocese of Llandaff.

Parts of the present church are thought to date from the twelfth century. The chancel is in the Perpendicular style, built of Old Red Sandstone and with square-headed windows and cinquefoiled ogee lights. The roof, supported by four pairs of hammer beams, is of unknown mediaeval date, restored in 1977. Monuments inside the church include one to George Milborne, who died in 1637.

The entire building was heavily restored in the 1860s, and the tower is dated 1865. Further restoration was undertaken in the 1880s, through gifts by Sir John and Lady Adela Searle after they came to live at nearby Wonastow Court. They also provided a new porch in 1909, and a rood screen and reredos in 1913, as well as stained glass windows and a new altar.

== The church today ==
Although only small numbers attend the weekly service, there is a great deal of regard and affection for the church by the wider community as witnessed by the successful restoration programme in recent years. The church is normally locked but visitors can obtain the key locally by prior arrangement with the Vicar.

== Church incumbents ==
- 1830: Joseph Fawcett Beddy
- 1870: Thomas O. Tudor
- 1879: Peter Potter
- 1891: Francis Dudley
- 1915: James Percy Lax Amos
- 1923: H. Raymond Harvey
- 1924: Ernest Anderson Thorne
- 1939: Edmund Loftus MacNaghten
- 1942: Ronald Davies
- 1943: Edmund Ronald James Henry
- 1947: Oliver Vivian Griffiths
- 1964: Norman Havelock Price
- 1993: Julian Francis Gray
- 1998: Richard Pain
- 2009: David McGladdery
- 2018: S Ghezzi and K A Dack
