= Hereford Cathedral Library =

Theological library in Hereford, England

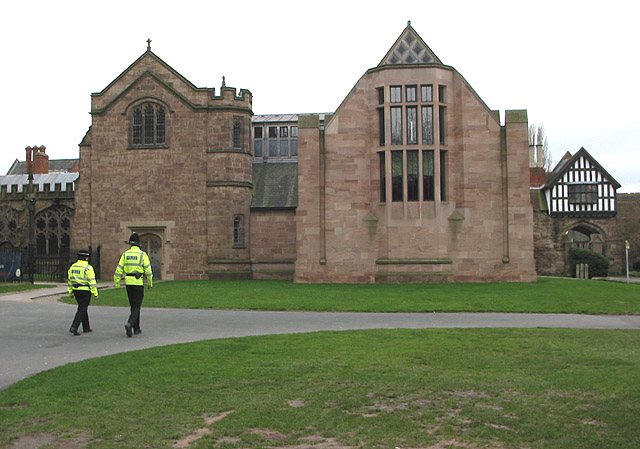
- The Chained Library at Hereford Cathedral
- 52.054219°N 2.715898°W
- Location: Hereford, United Kingdom
- Type: Christian library
- Scope: Historical books
- Established: 1611

Other information
- Website: herefordcathedral.org

Hereford Cathedral Library is a working theological lending and reference library located in Hereford Cathedral, Hereford, England; it also holds books and manuscripts of major importance to the history of the county of Herefordshire. Hereford Cathedral Library is also well known for its chained books as it is the only library of this type to survive with all of the chains, rods and locks still intact.

== History ==
=== 16th and 17th centuries ===
During the reign of Elizabeth I, in 1582, a commission investigating the cathedral found that the collection, gathered since the 12th century, was poorly organised and poorly kept. In 1590 the whole library was moved to the Lady Chapel, and in 1611 the Chained Library (with books in manuscript chained to their places) was established by Thomas Thornton. Thornton, who was canon of Hereford from 1583 onwards and vice-chancellor of Oxford University in 1583 and 1599, was the first to chain books in the library. William Brewster bequeathed the collection to St John's College, Oxford. Many books were added in the 17th century and in 1678 the collection from the Jesuit College at Cwm, Llanrothal, Wales, joined the library when the college was shut down following a raid by John Arnold of Monmouthshire at the time of the Popish Plot crisis.

=== 19th and 20th centuries ===
In the 1840s, the cathedral underwent considerable restoration work and the books and shelves had to be removed from the Lady Chapel. It was split between the North Transept and the Victorian Dean Leigh Library. In 1854, Francis Tebbs Havergal was appointed deputy librarian and he greatly improved the library and paid attention to details such as the room temperature and cleanliness. B. F. Streeter was responsible for a major change in the organisation of the library as were librarians such as Langton E. Brown and Maude Bull from 1897 onwards; Bull worked in the library for over fifty years until her death in 1951. For years, the notable scholar, Canon William Wolfe Capes (1834–1914), sorted records within the library; he printed a volume containing early records, presenting it to the members of the Cantilupe Society. Also important in the library's history were Frederick Charles Morgan (died 1978, aged 100) and his daughter Penelope (1976–90). F. C. Morgan supervised the cataloguing project of 1927 onwards, following a donation by the Dean Leigh Fund. His nephew Paul was succeeded as honorary librarian by Penelope Morgan who remained in the post until 1989. During the Second World War, the Mappa Mundi (the largest medieval map known to still exist) and other valuable manuscripts from the medieval period were kept elsewhere in safety and returned to the collection in 1946.

=== Mappa Mundi Library ===
In 1988 the Dean and Chapter proposed the sale of the Mappa Mundi and aroused considerable national opposition. Following the setting up of a dedicated trust, a donation from Sir Paul Getty, and an endowment from the National Heritage Memorial Fund, the Mappa and chained library were transferred to the Mappa Mundi Charitable Trust and a new building designed by Sir William Whitfield was opened on 3 May 1996 by the Queen to house the historic collections and the historic chained library, which is open to the public.

Both chained library and historic collections in store are now held in temperature-controlled, fire-resistant rooms and the Mappa and historic collection are much easier to access than they were in the cathedral. However, the chained library is still chained to the bookshelves.

== Collection ==
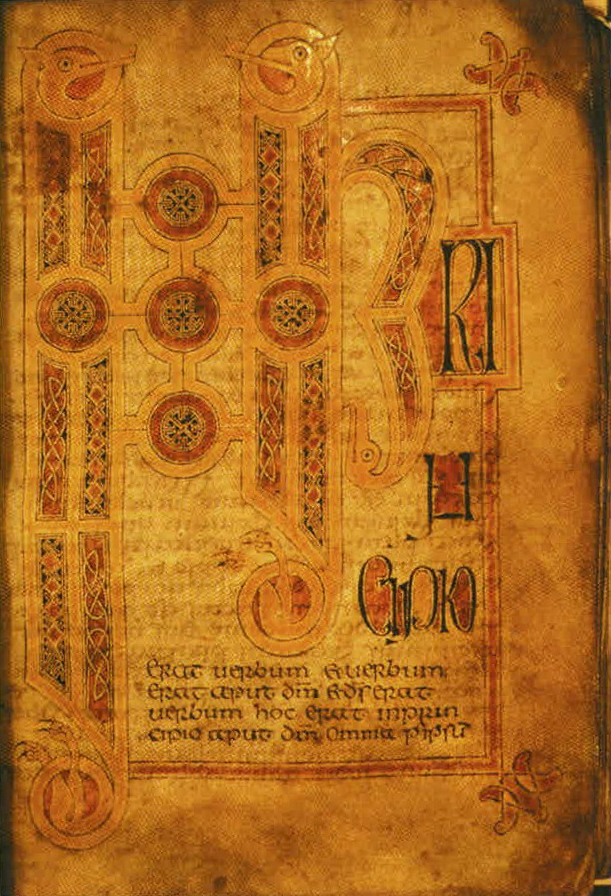
The Hereford Gospels, circa 780, illustrating the Gospel of John

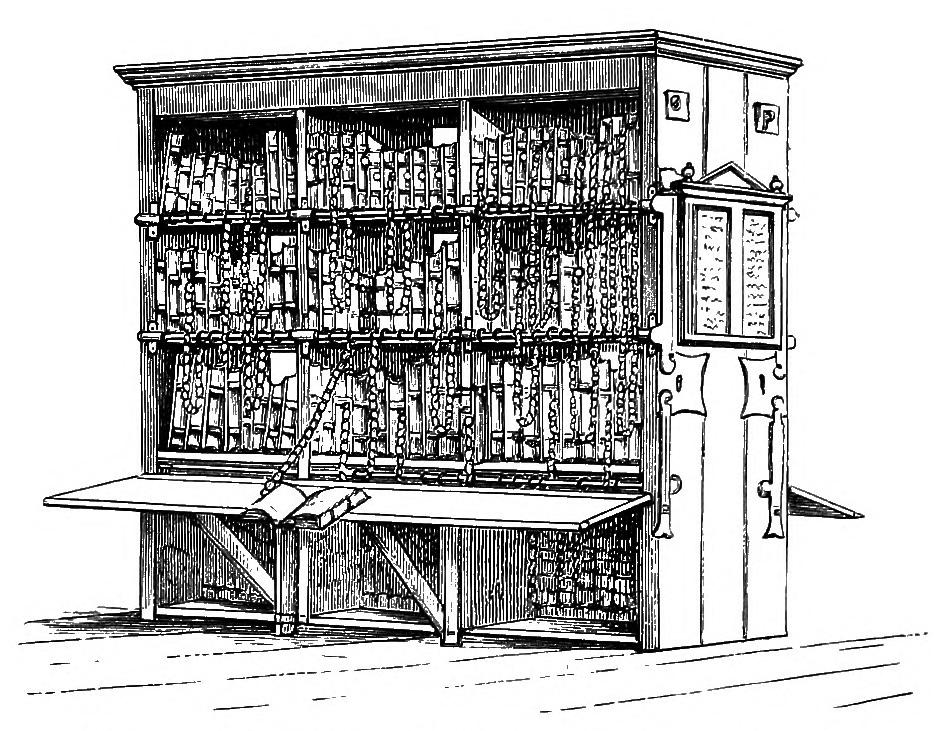
Drawing of Chained Books in Hereford Cathedral Library

Most of the books in the collection date to about 1100. The oldest volume in the library, the Hereford Gospels in Anglo-Saxon characters, dates to around the year 780 and was the only book to survive the 1055 fire. Many of the books and manuscripts were collected from Herefordshire, with many of those from the 14th century onwards related to county law. For several centuries books were stored in cupboards or wooden chests until the first library room was established, in the south-west cloister of the cathedral, in the 15th century.

The library contains mainly old books in manuscript chained to their places, some of them fine specimens of ancient handwriting, containing beautiful illustrations in gold and colour. The library has an ancient and well-preserved Hereford antiphonary of the 13th century. Another treasure is an ancient reliquary of oak, bequeathed to the cathedral by Canon Russell, said to have been obtained it from a Roman Catholic family in whose possession it had long been. It is covered with copper plates overlaid with Limoges enamel representing the murder and entombment of St. Thomas of Canterbury. The library is in possession of some 229 manuscripts, mainly theological, dated from the 8th to the 16th centuries. Aside from the Hereford Gospels, is the Wycliffite Bible and the 13th-century Hereford Breviary – the only surviving copy.

The Chained Library has about 1500 older books in its collection, dating mainly from the late 15th to the early 19th centuries, although it has some 56 books published before 1500. The bulk of the collection is of books on theology, biblical and church studies and law. Aside from the 150 volumes, dated to the 16th and 17th centuries, from the Jesuit Library at Llanrothal, it received, in 1925, 242 volumes on theology from Paul Foley of Stoke Edith House and, in 1978, 260 volumes printed between 1494–1782 from the Library of Lady Hawkins' School at Kington. The library has also received many other small donations over the years, revealing an important insight into the history of the county and ecclesiastical practices within it. The collection also contains music manuscripts used in Hereford Cathedral between the late 17th and 19th centuries and some 9,000 items printed after 1850, as well as a local history section.

== Bibliography ==
Notes

References

- Aylmer, G. E.; Tiller, John Eric (2000). Hereford Cathedral: a history (2000 ed.). Continuum International Publishing Group. ISBN 9781852851941. - Total pages: 672
