= Garren Brook =

River in Herefordshire, England

Coordinates: 51°51′44″N 2°38′27″W

The Garren Brook is a small river in Herefordshire, England which rises beneath the eastern slopes of Garway Hill. It flows east to the hamlet of Orcop where it turns south, taking a series of incised meanders past St Weonards before turning east again, then south past Llangarron, again in a series of incised meanders. Southeast of there it enters the right bank of the River Wye at Old Forge. Its largest tributary is the left bank stream known as The Gamber which enters it at Trehumfrey north of Llangarron, having originated on the north side of Orcop Hill. Other right bank tributaries include the Llantywaun and Llanerch brooks. It flows over a landscape formed in the mudstones and sandstones of the St Maughans and Brownstones formations of the Old Red Sandstone.
