= St John the Baptist's Church, Llanrothal =

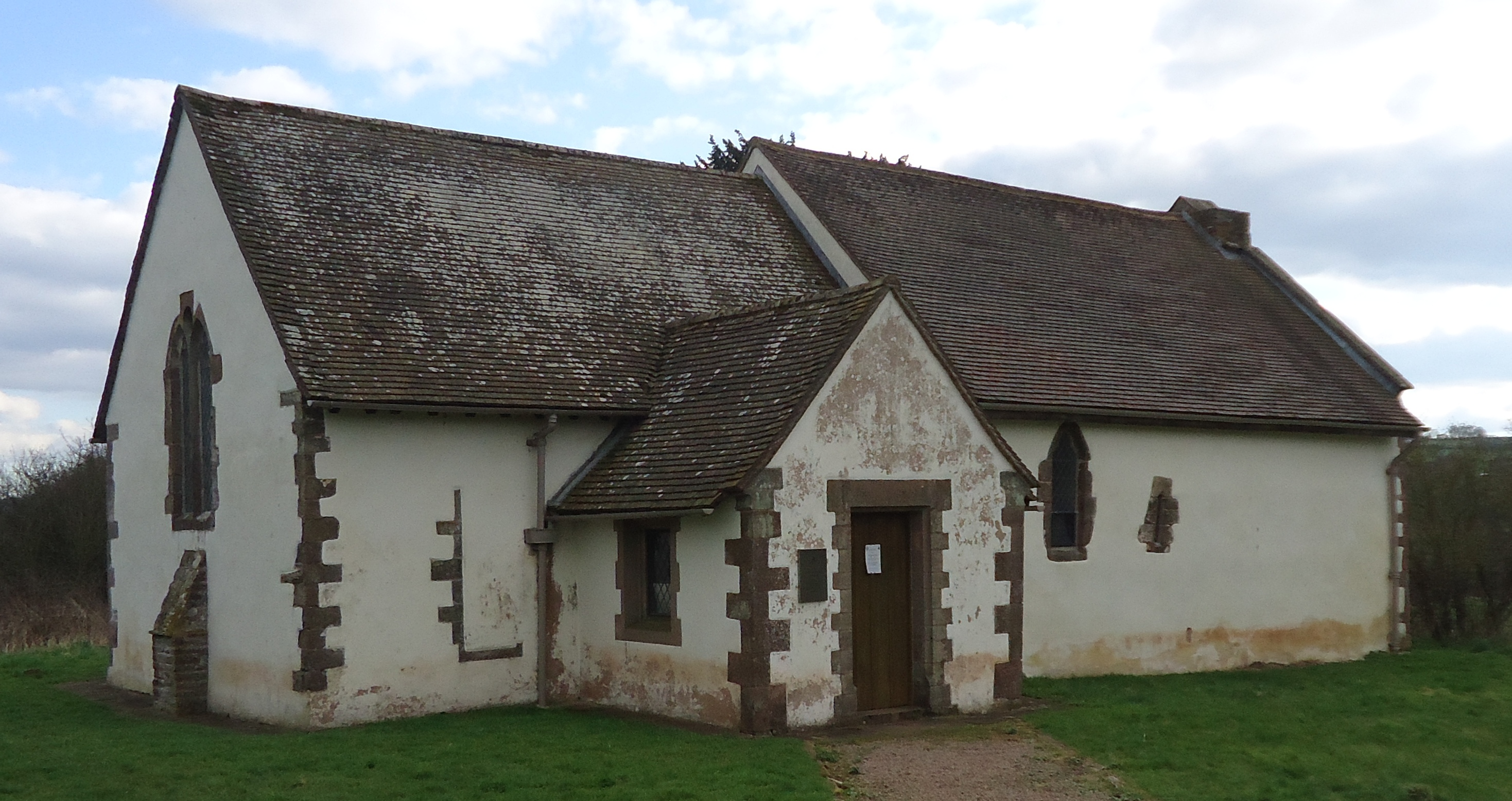
- St John the Baptist's Church, Llanrothal, from the northwest

- Location in Herefordshire
- 51.8633°N 2.7701°W
- OS grid reference: SO 470 185
- Location: Llanrothal, Herefordshire
- Country: England
- Denomination: Anglican
- Website: Churches Conservation Trust

History
- Dedication: John the Baptist

Architecture
- Functional status: Redundant
- Heritage designation: Grade II*
- Designated: 25 February 1966
- Architectural type: Church
- Style: Norman. Gothic

St John the Baptist's Church is a redundant Anglican church in Llanrothal, Herefordshire, England. It is recorded in the National Heritage List for England as a designated Grade II* listed building, and is under the care of the Churches Conservation Trust. It stands in a remote position close to the Wales–England border overlooking the River Monnow.

== History ==
The church is thought to have been founded by the Celtic Saint Ridol (or Ryddol) and re-dedicated to St John the Baptist in the Norman period. The present building dates from the 12th and 13th centuries. During the 20th century the chancel and vestry were restored. The church was vested in the Churches Conservation Trust on 1 April 1985.

St John's has been described as "one of the most isolated churches in Herefordshire". It lies a few hundred yards from the river.

== Architecture ==
The exterior of the church has been rendered. Its plan is simple, consisting of a nave and a chancel, with a north porch, which was previously a vestry. In the north wall of the nave is a Norman round-headed window from the 12th century, and a window from the 13th century with a trefoil head. There are two windows similar to the latter in the south wall. In the south wall of the chancel is a large four-light window. The east window has two lights, with a circular window above. Inside the church is a 17th-century panelled pulpit, and a brass chandelier which was donated by Ivor Bulmer-Thomas.

The font is a simple bowl on a narrow pedestal dating from the Norman period. It is decorated with a cross pattée, although there is no known association with the Knights Templar. The altar is simple and consists of a stone slab resting on two blocks of stone.

View of St John the Baptist's from the road

== See also ==
- List of churches preserved by the Churches Conservation Trust in the English Midlands
