= Wonastow =

Wonastow Llanwarw
- Village
- Church of St Wonnow
- Interactive map of Wonastow
- Coordinates: 51°47′41″N 2°44′56″W
- Country: Wales
- County: Monmouthshire

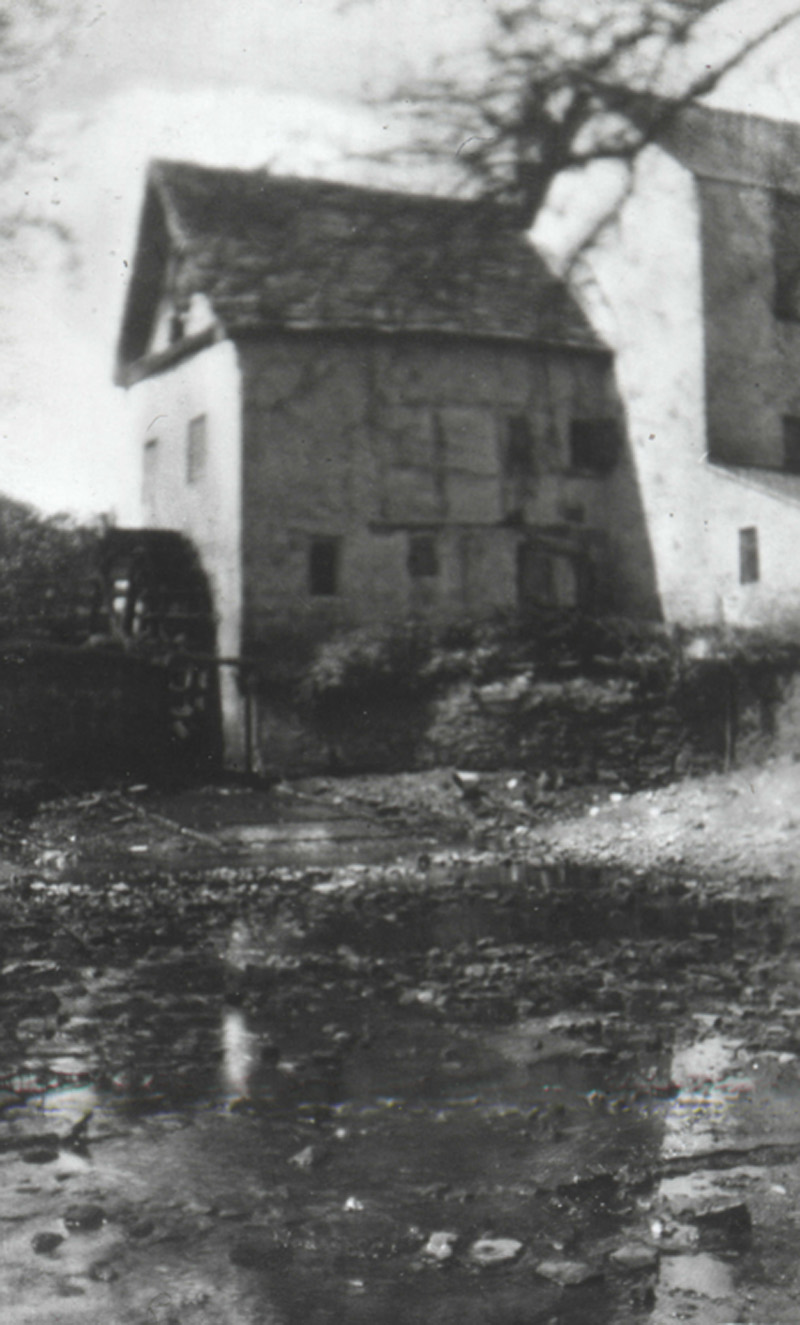
Wonastow Mill including the wheel

Wonastow (Welsh: Llanwarw) is a village in Monmouthshire, south east Wales. It is located 2 miles (3.2 km) south west of Monmouth.

== History and amenities ==
Wonastow has a twelfth-century church dedicated to St. Wonnow or Saint Winwaloe, believed to have been built on a seventh-century religious site.

There is also a chapel at Gwern-y-Saint, named Providence Chapel on the foundation stone, built in 1850 as a Primitive Methodist place of worship.

Built using locally found stone, on land gifted by Miss Williams of Gwern-y-Saint farm.

Services were held regularly until 2018 and on a more occasional basis since.

Monmouth's Wonastow Road industrial estate adjoins the road between Wonastow and Monmouth. In the 16th century the Harberte family held Wonastow Court, amongst them several High Sheriffs of Monmouthshire. In the 17th century the prominent Milbourne family had their seat here, amongst them men such as Henry Milbourne who was one of the most important magistrates of northern Monmouthshire of his time and his nephew, William Milborne (1633-1660), an MP.
