= Henry Milbourne =

Welsh magistrate

- Born: circa 1600
- Died: after 1692
- Occupation: Magistrate

Henry Milbourne, also Milburne or Milborne, (circa 1600 – after 1692) was a Welsh magistrate who served as the Recorder of Monmouth and as agent to the Duke of Beaufort.

== Biography ==
Milbourne hailed from Wonastow, near Monmouth, South Wales and reportedly had his seat at Wonastow Court. He is also linked to the village of Clytha. He was the uncle of William Milbourne (c.1633–1660), also of Wonastow, and in 1658, William is recorded as entering his uncle's chambers at the Middle Temple. He was also the great-uncle of the MP Clayton Milbourne (aft. 1676–1726).

Milbourne served as a steward at the Jesuit college at The Cwm which was owned by the Worcester Estate, in the parish of Llanrothal, Herefordshire in the 1670s. During this period, Milbourne probably lived in nearby Hilston House, a few miles away across the border in Monmouthshire. He is known to have been the steward of Cwm at the time it was raided, during the Popish Plot in 1678, by Border Protestants such as Herbert Croft, John Arnold of Monmouthshire and ultra-Protestant Charles Price. Arnold reportedly gave some of his harshest criticism to Milbourne, describing him as an "undoubted Papist" who only "held lands wirth £100 per annum in one county, but is made justice of the peace in four". He denounced Milbourne in the House of Commons but with little success; several MPs believed Arnold's report was poorly constructed and some believed that the lord-lieutenant was a Catholic activist in South Wales. Also involved in the dispute was Milbourne's uncle Rowland Prichard, who claimed "to pay an extra £10 a year rent to be allowed to have mass said at his house at Llanrothal" and one of Milborne's servants. Milbourne is said to have "laid violent hands on the chief constable so that the servant could escape" and was fined a shilling per Sunday, which Milbourne refused to levy. Milbourne was then involved in the Wentwood Case along with the Deputy Governor of Chepstow. Milbourne assisted John Aubrey and Thomas Fuller with research for their works.
