= Cwm, Llanrothal =

Jesuit gathering place

Cwm
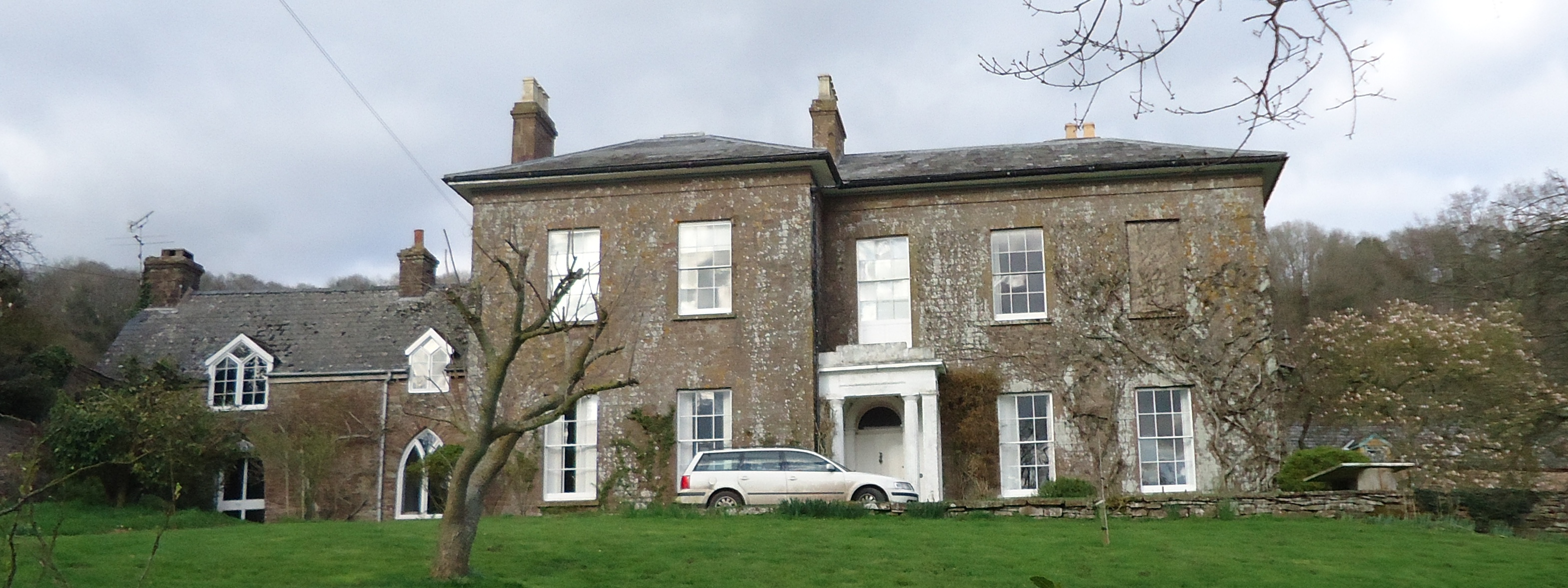
- Cwm

- Location within Herefordshire

General information
- Location: Near Llanrothal, Herefordshire, England
- Coordinates: 51°51′17″N 2°44′36″W

Cwm (also known as Come and Welsh Jesuit College of St Francis Xavier) was a Jesuit gathering place, Ecclesiastical province and college in Llanrothal, Herefordshire, England. It became a Jesuit college in 1622. Based in a large farmhouse, the Cwm included two houses, called "Upper Cwm" and "Lower Cwm". They were divided by a walled forecourt and during their prime in the early 17th century each was able to generate £60 (equivalent to £10,000 in 2025) annually in rents from its own land.

In 1678, Cwm came under attack during the Popish Plot, when it was raided by such Protestants as Bishop Croft, John Arnold of Monmouthshire and ultra-Protestant Charles Price. Some 150 volumes of its library were confiscated and removed to Hereford Cathedral Library. In 1830 the original buildings were mostly demolished and the existing structure, now a Grade II listed building, dates from soon afterwards,

== History ==
The Jesuits' South Wales Mission was originally based about 14 miles (23 km) to the south, in Raglan, Monmouthshire, but soon after the year 1600, their Superior received from the Earl of Worcester an estate called The Cwm in the parish of Llanrothal. In the post-Reformation period, South Wales was a strongly recusant part of the country and Jan Morris, in her history The Matter of Wales, suggests that "the most Catholic district of all Wales, probably of all Britain, was that corner of Gwent by the English border". The estate consisted of farm buildings and land between the villages of Welsh Newton and Llanrothal, about 5 miles (8 km) from Pontrilas. The Cwm became "one of the two focal points of disturbance in June and July 1605". That year, Father Robert Jones who resided at Cwm, was implicated in an attempt to save two of the Gunpowder Plot perpetrators.

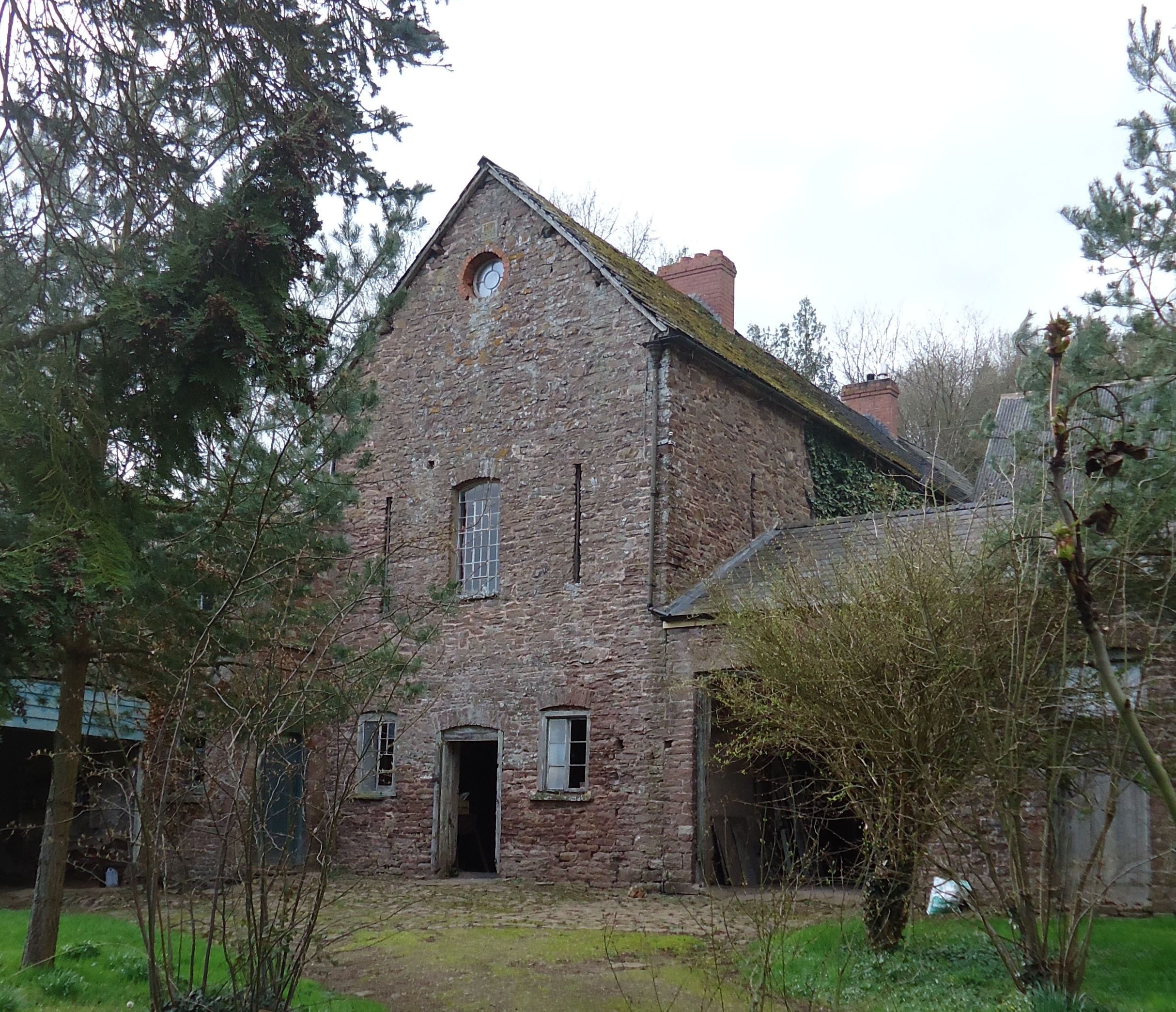
Lower Cwm house

Henry Milbourne worshipped with the Jesuits at the Cwm for some time and refused to issue warrants under the Elizabethan legislation, saying that it was not intended for use against Papists. In the early 17th century, it was home to the recusant William Griffith. The province was founded in 1622 by Fr. John Salusbury (d. 1625), and it sheltered the College of St Francis Xavier, leading the Cwm college to become known as the Welsh Jesuit College of St Francis Xavier. After Salusbury's death, Charles Gwynne (also known as Bodvel) became rector. Serving as a refuge for priests (1625–1678), in 1648 it was the base of the martyr St David Lewis, who became head of the Catholic seminary there.

In time the existence of the college became a matter of public knowledge, and by 1676 there were demands in the House of Commons for it to be suppressed. In 1678, it came under attack during the Popish Plot, when it was raided by such Protestants as Bishop Croft, John Arnold of Monmouthshire and ultra-Protestant Charles Price.

== Buildings and grounds ==
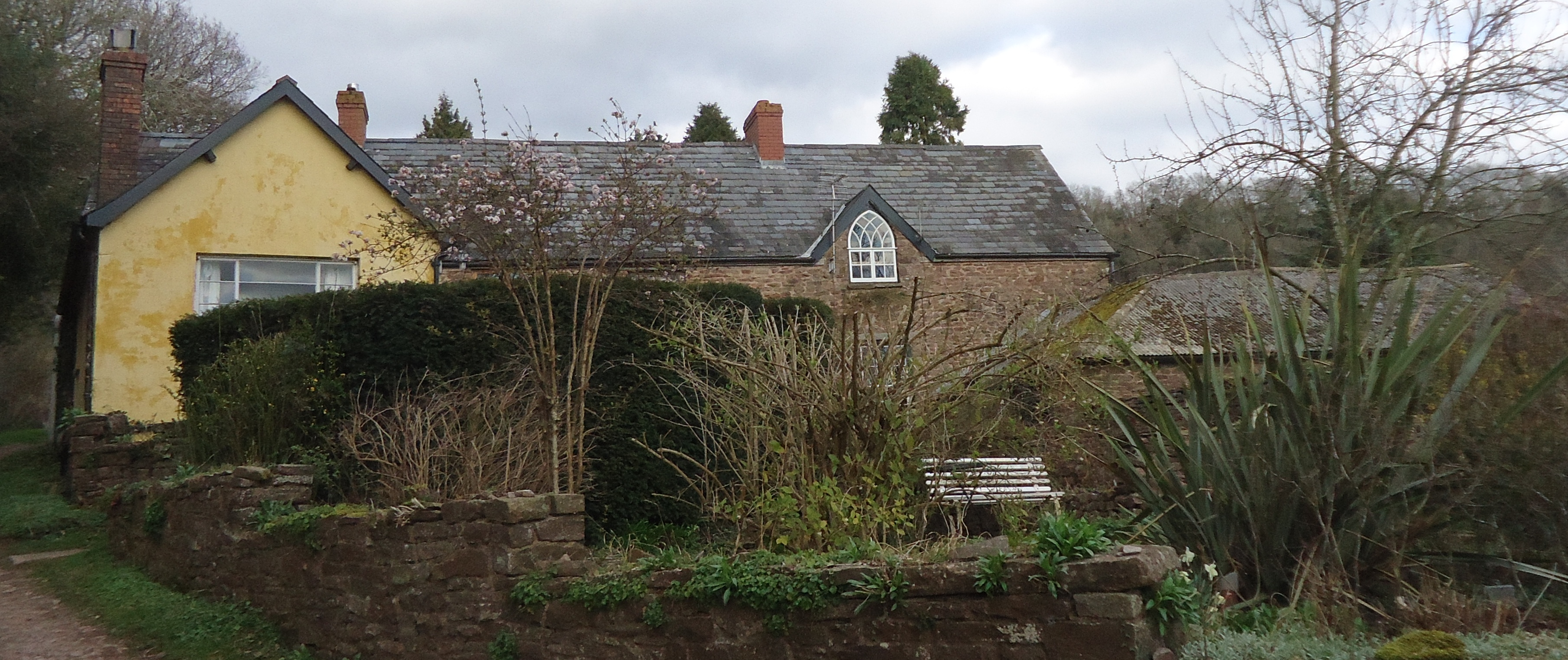
Lower Cwm house

Based in a large farmhouse, the Cwm included two houses, called "Upper Cwm" and "Lower Cwm". They were divided by a walled forecourt and during their prime each was able to generate £60 (equivalent to £10,000 in 2025) annually in rents from its own land. At one time, Cwm had a library, and in 1678 some 150 volumes were confiscated and removed to Hereford Cathedral Library.

The original buildings were mostly demolished in 1830. The existing structure dates from soon afterwards, and is on the site of the now demolished 17th-century house that held the Jesuit college and incorporates part of it. Enough remains of the original house, half-way up the long range of hills which slope down to the River Monnow, to trace the life led by its Jesuit inmates in the penal times. Originally a shooting box, and subsequently a farmhouse, it is Grade II listed, together with the terrace in front of the house, and the retaining wall to the side, which contains rare bee boles. There is a wood in the area known today as Cwm Wood.

== See also ==
- List of Jesuit sites
