= William Wolfe Capes =

British librarian

William Wolfe Capes (1834–1914) was a notable Hereford scholar.

== Life ==
Capes attended St Paul's School, London, and the Queen's College, Oxford, where he matriculated in 1851, graduating B.A. in 1856, and becoming a Fellow there. Ordained in 1868, he was a cleric in the Diocese of Winchester, rector of Liphook, rector of Bramshott, and canon of Worcester. In addition, he served as Fellow of Hertford College, Oxford, as well as bursar, fellow, tutor and reader of the Queen's College, Oxford. A noted scholar, he dealt with records of the Hereford Cathedral Library, presenting his published work to the members of the Cantilupe Society. He was also a member of the Canterbury and York Society. He was elected an honorary fellow of Queen's College, Oxford in November 1902.

Capes was the uncle of Charles Webster Leadbeater, an influential member of the Theosophical Society. The essayist Walter Pater was his student.

== Partial list of works ==
- The Roman Empire of the second century; or, The age of the Antonines. With ... maps (1876)
- University life in ancient Athens (1877)
- Livy: An account of his life and works (1879)
- The Roman Empire of the second century or The age of Antonines (1880)
- Stoicism (1880)
- The English church in the 14th and 15th centuries (1900)
- Scenes of rural life in Hampshire among the manors of Bramshott, (1901)
- Charters and Records of Hereford Cathedral. (840–1421) Transcribed and edited with an introduction by W. W. Capes. Lat. (1908)
- The Register of Richard de Swinfield, Bishop of Hereford (A.D. 1283–1317). Transcribed and edited by W. W. Capes. Lat. (1909)
- The Register of Thomas de Charlton, Bishop of Hereford (A.D. 1327–1344). Edited by William W. Capes. (1912)
- The Register of William de Courtenay, Bishop of Hereford, A.D. 1370–1375. Edited by William W. Capes. (1913)
- The Register of John Trefnant, Bishop of Hereford, A.D. 1389–1404. Edited by William W. Capes. (1914)
- The Register of Thomas Poltone, Bishop of Hereford, A.D. 1420–1422. Transcribed by the late William W. Capes ... To which is prefixed a memoir of Canon Capes by John Percival, Lord Bishop of Hereford. Lat. (1916)
