= Llangarron =

Village in Herefordshire, England

Coordinates: 51.8870°N 2.6846°W

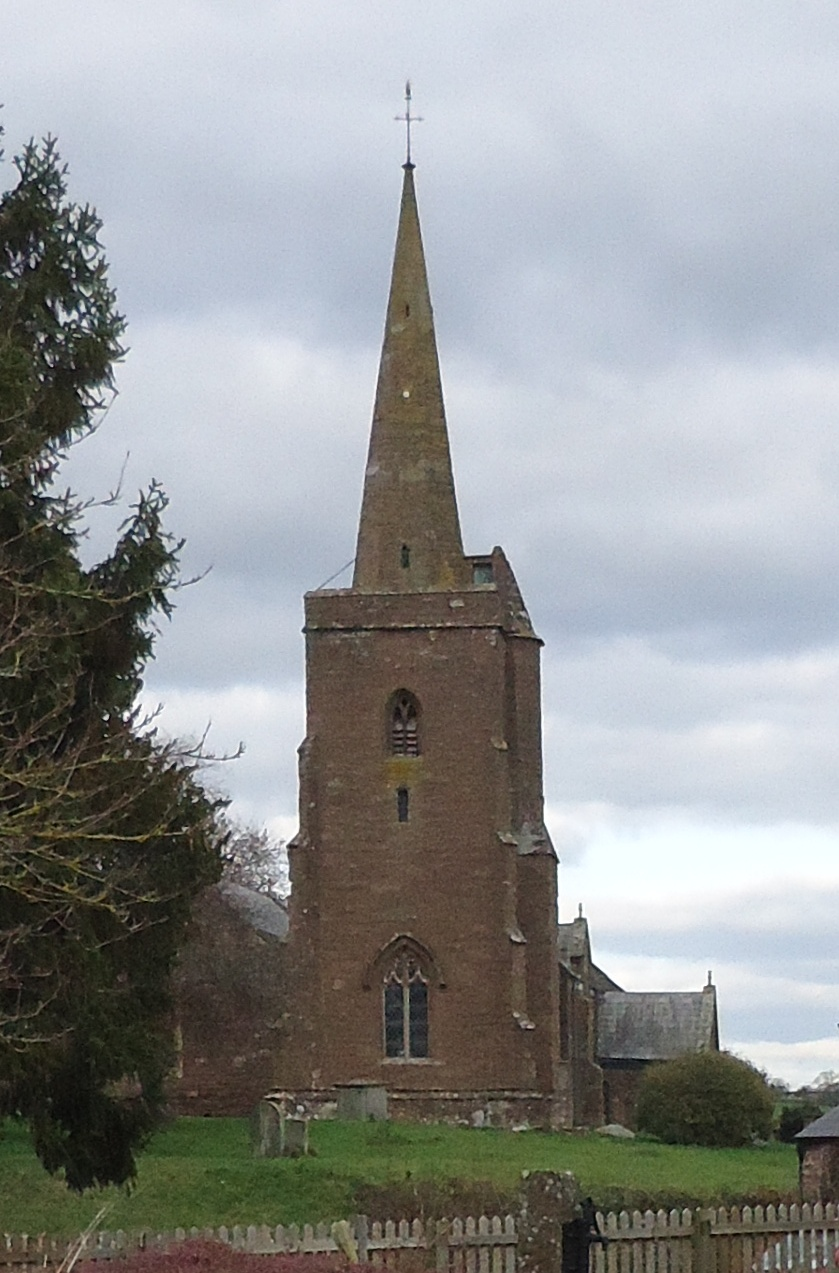
- Church of St Deinst, Llangarron

- Location within Herefordshire
- Population: 1,053 (2011 Census)
- Unitary authority: Herefordshire
- Ceremonial county: Herefordshire
- Region: West Midlands
- Country: England
- Sovereign state: United Kingdom
- Post town: Ross-on-Wye
- Postcode district: HR9
- Police: West Mercia
- Fire: Hereford and Worcester
- Ambulance: West Midlands
- UK Parliament: Hereford and South Herefordshire

Llangarron is a small village and civil parish in southwest Herefordshire within 7 miles (11 km) of both Ross-on-Wye (Herefordshire, England) and Monmouth (Monmouthshire, Wales). The population of the civil parish at the 2011 census was 1,053. The civil parish includes the settlements of Llangrove, Llancloudy, Biddlestone and Three Ashes. The church is dedicated to St. Deinst (a Celtic saint who died in c584). The village no longer has a post office nor pub, though it does have a community hall.

The name, also spelt Llangarren and Llangarran, refers to the Garron Brook, a tributary of the River Wye. Several local farms have Welsh names, a representative legacy of the Welsh kingdom of Ergyng (Herefordshire today), and the fluid nature of the England-Wales border in the past. A variant suggestion is that the name derives from “garan”, Welsh for stork or heron, as a heron-like bird is depicted in the church gates.

== Church and other buildings ==
The dedication to 'St Deinst' exists for no other Anglican church. It is identified with St. Deiniol, or Deiniel, a sixth-century abbot-bishop and founder of a monastery at Bangor and to whom the mediaeval Bangor Cathedral was dedicated. Records of a church at Llangarron begin in the reign of Edward the Confessor, when a church was consecrated at the site, and a subsequent re-consecration as "lan garan" church is recorded in the reign of William I.

Other buildings of note in the parish, all of which are Grade II* listed, are Langstone Court, a late seventeenth-century red-brick house, Ruxton Court, an Elizabethan stone and half-timbered farmhouse, and Bernithan Court, which was built in about 1960 on the foundations of an older house.

== Governance ==
An electoral ward in the same name exists. This ward stretches towards Ross-on-Wye with a total population taken at the 2011 Census of 3,357.

== See also ==
- Archenfield
