= Wonastow Court =

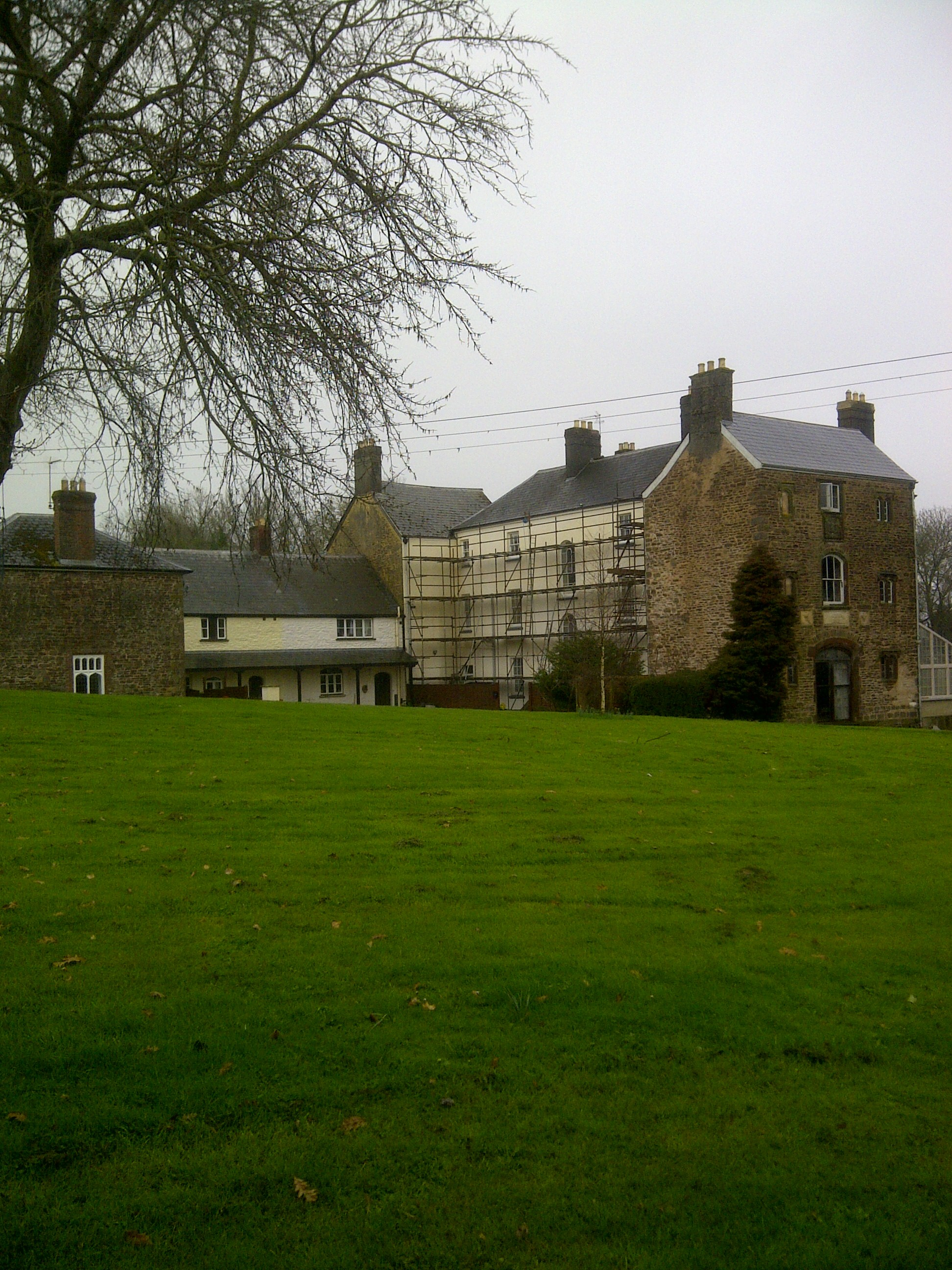
- Wonastow Court
- Interactive map of the Wonastow Court area

General information
- Location: Wonastow, Wales
- Coordinates: 51.7939°N 2.7472°W
- Construction started: 1803 and earlier
- Client: Thomas Swinnerton

Design and construction
- Designations: Grade II listing / Cadw/ICOMOS Register of Parks and Gardens of Special Historic Interest in Wales

Wonastow Court, in Wonastow, Monmouthshire, Wales, is a 19th-century country house with earlier origins and later additions. The court is a Grade II listed building, and its gardens are listed, also at Grade II, on the Cadw/ICOMOS Register of Parks and Gardens of Special Historic Interest in Wales.

== History ==
The origins of the court are a 16th-century manor house, subsequently reduced and rebuilt. The existing central block was built for Thomas Swinnerton in 1803. Newman describes the court as "classical in style, of three storeys and five bays with (a) Doric porch. To the right of the central block is a gatehouse in a "Tudor style" of the later 19th century, whilst to the left is the original 17th-century house of the Milbournes. At one time the mansion had its own chapel but that had been converted into offices by the 20th century. The court is a Grade II listed building as of 5 January 1952. Its gardens are listed, also at Grade II, on the Cadw/ICOMOS Register of Parks and Gardens of Special Historic Interest in Wales.

It was owned by Sir Lionel Milborne-Swinnerton-Pilkington bt. in 1901 although the person living there was Sir John Henry Seale, who was a baronet, Deputy Lieutenant and a Justice of the Peace.
