= Christian library =

Library with a focus on Christianity

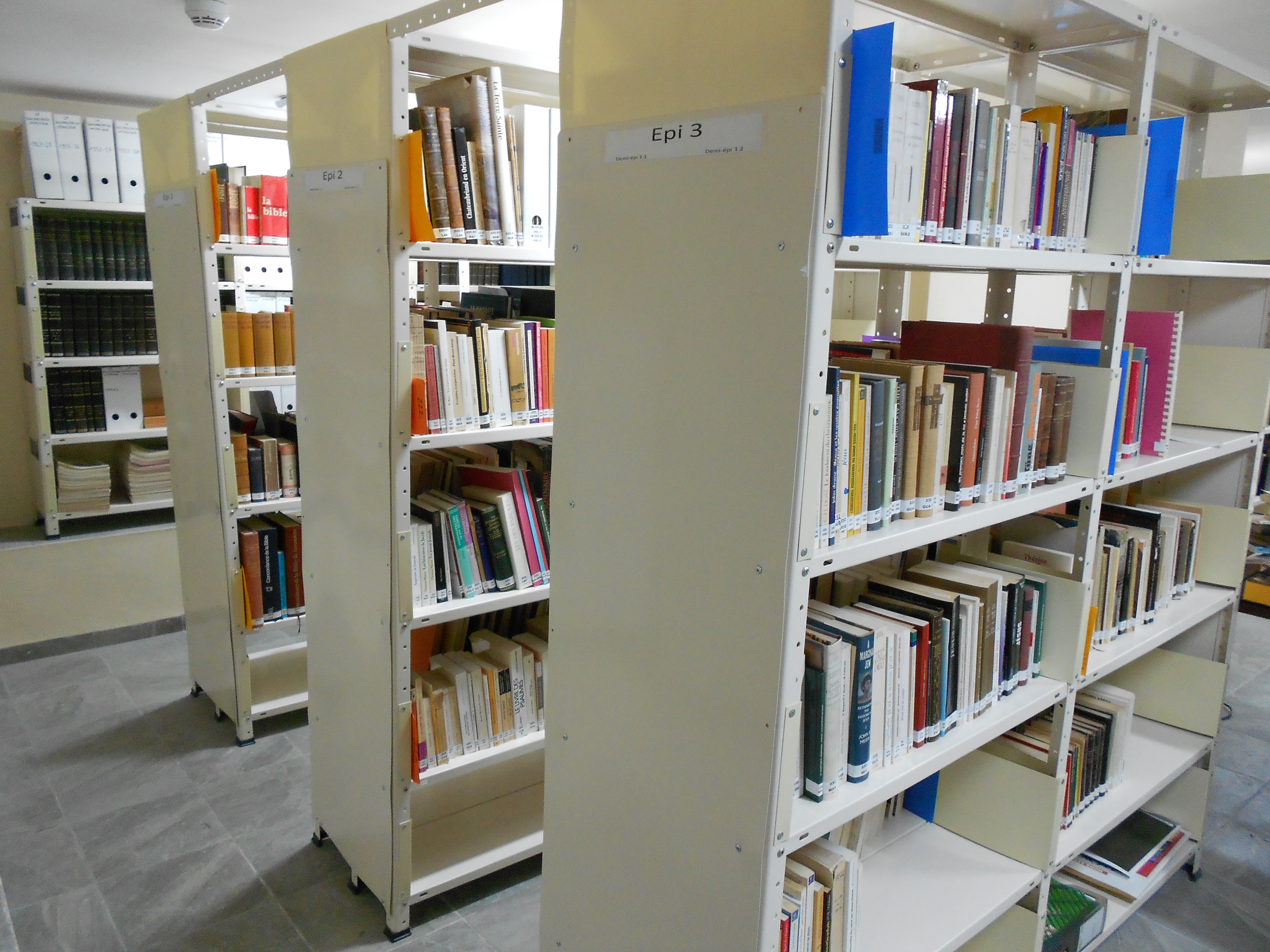
Image on the cover page of the "Assomptionist Community Library: Computer Entry and Dewey Classification" report.

A Christian library or theological library is a kind of library that has its origins in the Jewish religion whose practice and transmission depended on the keeping and duplication of sacred texts. Like Judaism, Christianity depends fundamentally on the preservation and study of a sacred text. From this it follows that the texts and the secondary literature will be collected for the use of the literate members of the religious communities and passed on to succeeding generations.

== Early Christian libraries ==
The integral relationship between Christianity and its texts has always ensured a central place for books, for learning, and for libraries among Christians. The passing of two millennia has witnessed changes in the manner and intensity of Christian scholarship, yet it has always been the case that theological learning is inconceivable without libraries and librarians doing the work both of collecting the theological insights of the past and anticipating future theological and religious trends.

The establishment of the Christian canon has classically been a subject of central interest to the Christian religion (though in more recent years it has become a special study for theologians and textual critics). It also has a direct bearing on the origins of Christian libraries. As preliminary consensus in the formation of a canon was arrived at, early Christian communities would typically entrust to a member of the community the task of providing care and security for those documents that authentically represented the identity and cohesion of each community in this upstart (and frequently embattled) religion.

The impulse to keep valued texts and documents safe but accessible shaped the patterns of early collections, and the first recorded mention of early Christian library activity comes down to us from a context of hostility. Under the Emperor Diocletian (3rd-century), a series of edicts against the Christians included orders that Christian books be seized and destroyed. From this it can reasonably be inferred that it was typical for a local Christian assembly to possess a collection of texts of one kind or another, and that the authorities considered the destruction of such materials to be an essential part of suppressing the Christian faith.

=== The library at Jerusalem ===
Bishop Alexander of Jerusalem established a library during his tenure (first half of the 3rd century): this is known from the records of an actual "reader", Eusebius of Caesarea, who mentions some of the works he found there. Possibly Alexander's library had as its model the notable Classical collection of Alexandria: it may be that while still in the Egyptian city, Origen encouraged his student Alexander to initiate a center for study in Jerusalem.

=== The library at Caesarea ===
Origen influenced the establishment of the early Christian library of greatest renown, that at Caesarea, based on his own private collection. The great Jerome was later associated with this library, although a lot of the specific library work appears to have been the task of Pamphilus who, according to Jerome, "searched throughout the world for examples that were true and eternal monuments of gifted writers." Through these efforts, the library grew to include thousands of volumes, a staggering accomplishment when one considers the labor involved in copying by hand. The breadth and quality of this collection is attested by the range of sources cited by Eusebius, who relied on this library in research for his works. Primary collections included all the works of Origen, as well as contemporaries such as Clement of Alexandria, Apollinaris, Justin, Irenaeus, and virtually all the important ecclesiastical writers of the period. Since the library performed the critical functions of copying, revising and gathering texts into usable selections, scriptural texts were present in abundance.

Preservation issues also presented themselves: we have record of there having been projects to "convert" the library (or at least its most heavily used segments) from papyrus to parchment. Caesarea's was, in almost every modern sense, principally a research rather than a congregational or liturgical library. In this setting ambitious critical works were housed, and ever more ambitious and critical works were written, and it would be some time before any Christian library again rose to the standard set in Caesarea.

=== The library at Alexandria ===
Of a specifically Christian library in Alexandria (as distinct from the renowned Classical library of Alexandria of earlier centuries) less is known. Given the prominence of the city within the Greek world of letters, it is quite possible that authoritative teaching figures such as Pantaenus and Clement put their personal libraries at the disposal of students, and that over time a Christian library took shape.

=== The early library of the Bishop of Rome ===
It was not until the 4th and 5th centuries, when political conditions permitted, that "episcopal" libraries took shape in Rome, situated in the Lateran Palace. Here were housed not only theological works, but, in keeping with the administrative function, archives as well.

=== The library at Hippo Regius ===
Of all the Christian libraries in the West in the first six centuries, most is known most about the library at Hippo, home of Augustine. No distinction is made in the contemporary accounts between his personal library and that of the church, so it is probable that the two were housed together The librarian recorded over a thousand items under Augustine's personal authorship, and the collection is certain to have included scriptural books, the works of other Latin and Greek Christian writers, and a rich selection of "secular" works. The collection was fully catalogued but along with the rest of the collection this index is lost.

=== Further improvements ===
When it was safe to do so, Christianity made the most of the accomplishments of Roman civilization with respect to books and libraries: if the possession of a well-stocked library was considered an enviable adornment to a Roman house, it is probable that a similar element of prestige was conferred on those Christian gathering places which possessed the premier collections of letters and texts. Jerome (4th and 5th century), for example, was able to assume that wherever there was a congregation, books would be found. In the course of things, those churches that became regional administrative centers tended to develop the best collections.

=== The Near East ===
Of early Christian libraries in the East, far less is known. The Imperial Library of Constantinople encompassed at its peak over 100,000 items but in no sense was it primarily a theological library.

== Libraries in the monastic setting ==
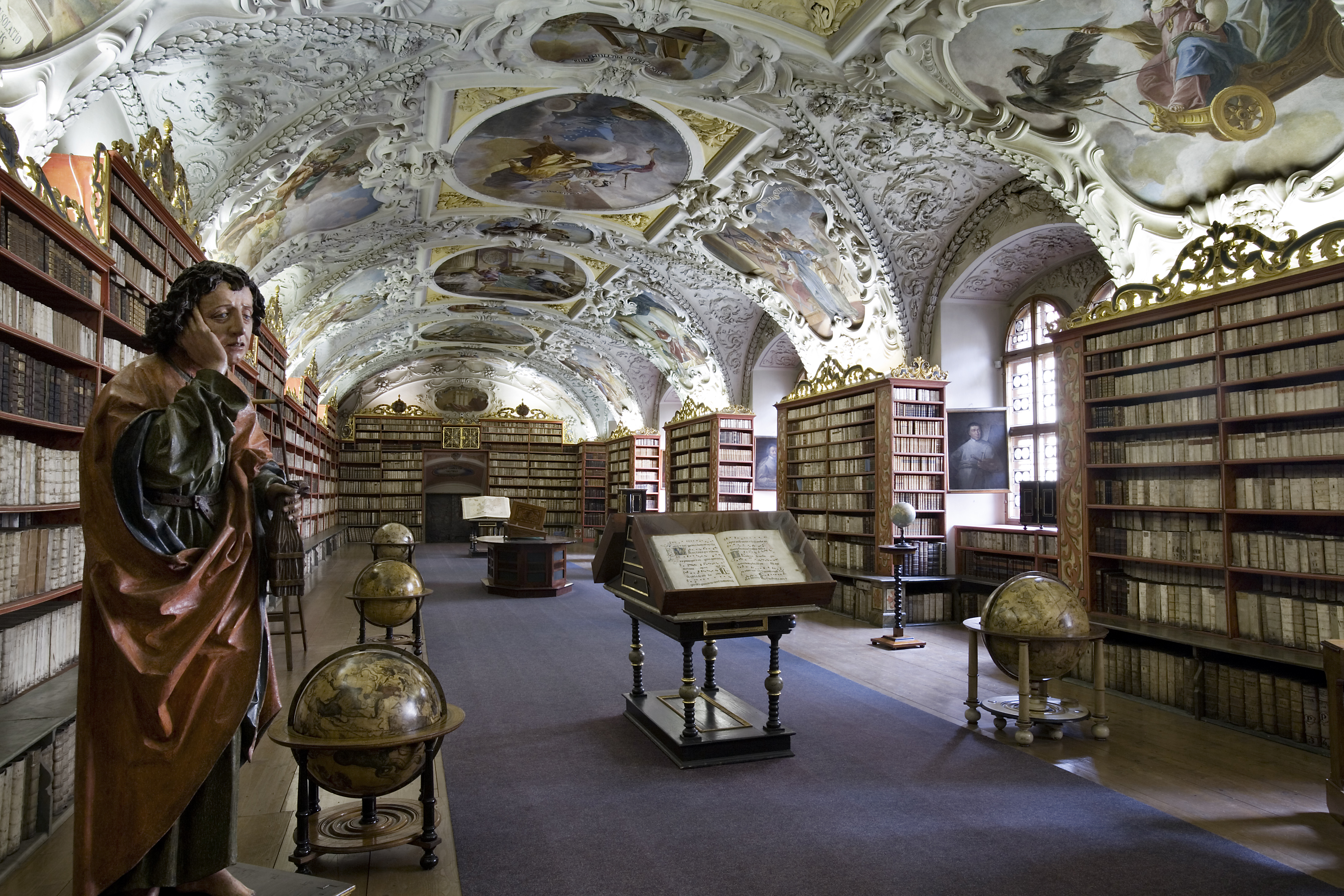
Library of Strahov Monastery.

The earliest examples come from Egypt. Monasteries under the direction of Pachomius (4th century) and Shenouda (5th century) required that members learn to read, and it was further expected that they would borrow and study texts from the community's collection. (Twentieth-century archeological discoveries—Phobaimmon and Nag Hammadi, for example–-have indicated that there was a tremendous amount of activity in writing and copying texts, and one library "catalog" from the period lists eighty titles.) Collections were composed of biblical texts, lectionaries, church canons, hagiography/biography, etc.

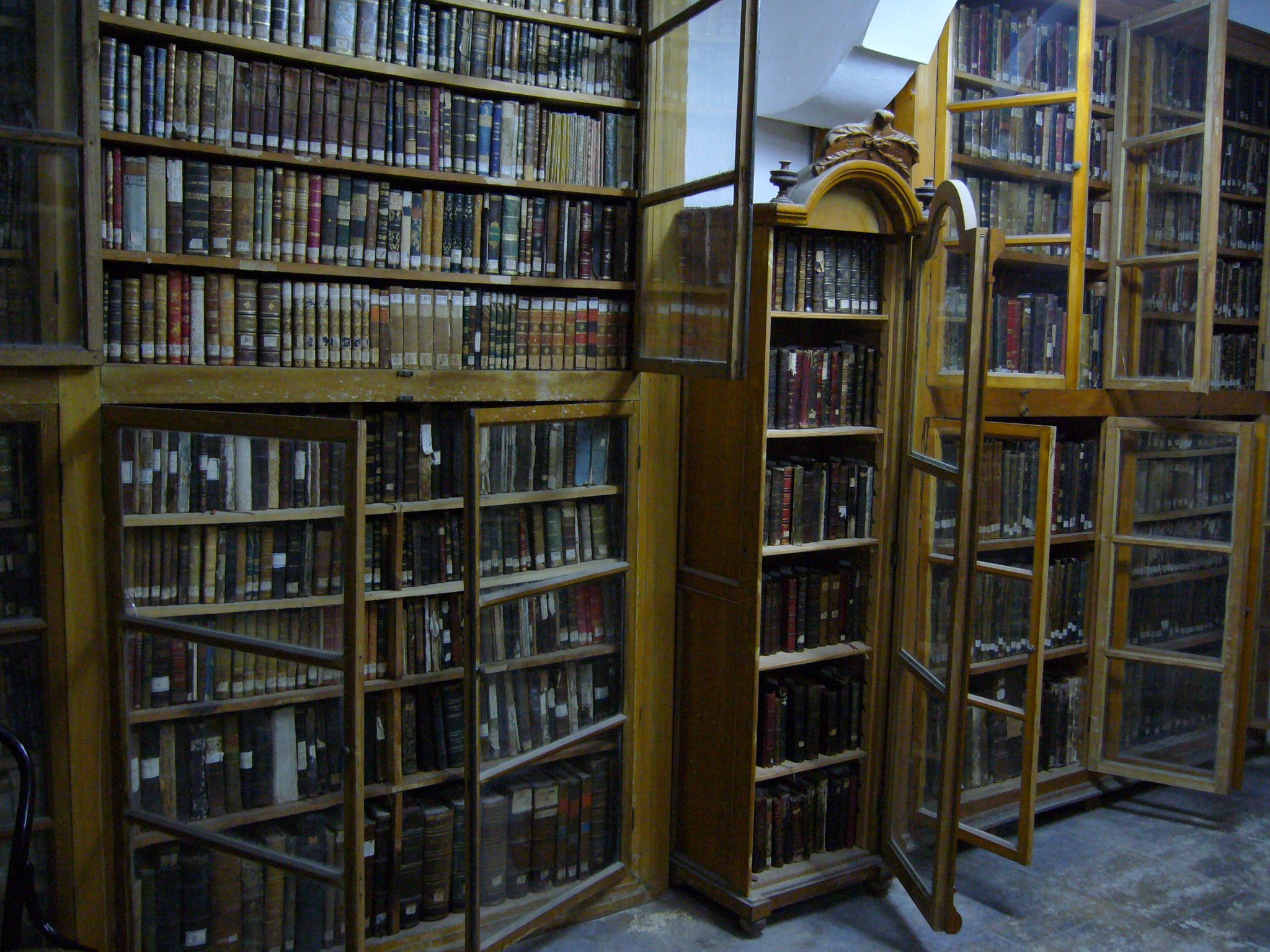
Monastic library in Mount Athos.

In Eastern Christendom, monastic libraries developed on a similar pattern. "Catalogs" were simply inventories of items held by the community. On those rare occasions when a community's benefactor would donate their personal collection, the tendency was not to dispose of questionable or even heretical works: given the short supply of texts, almost any item would be considered a "rare book". The common practice in monastic life was for the abbot (or equivalent) to be charged with the responsibility for securing and caring for the collection.

Cassiodorus, a monk from southern Italy, left a compendious work of bibliography, the Institituiones divinarum et saecularum litterarum (Institutes of Divine and Secular Literature), which surveys first Christian and then secular texts, providing notes and commentary along the way. An earlier attempt at Rome to establish a theological school had been frustrated, and so on his family's estate at Calabria he established the "Vivarium", as a setting in which "to incorporate systematic theological study into monastic life." (Gamble, 1990) With this in view he assembled a large library of both Christian and Classical texts and designed a curriculum of study. He undertook his monastic and bibliographic work only after a long and well-rewarded career in the service of the Goths, and hence the work we remember him for can be seen as aspiring "to combat the growing chaos of the world" (Southern, " Benedictine," 167). We learn from the Institutiones how he had these sub-collections housed, what they included, together with how they were obtained.

== The Later Middle Ages ==
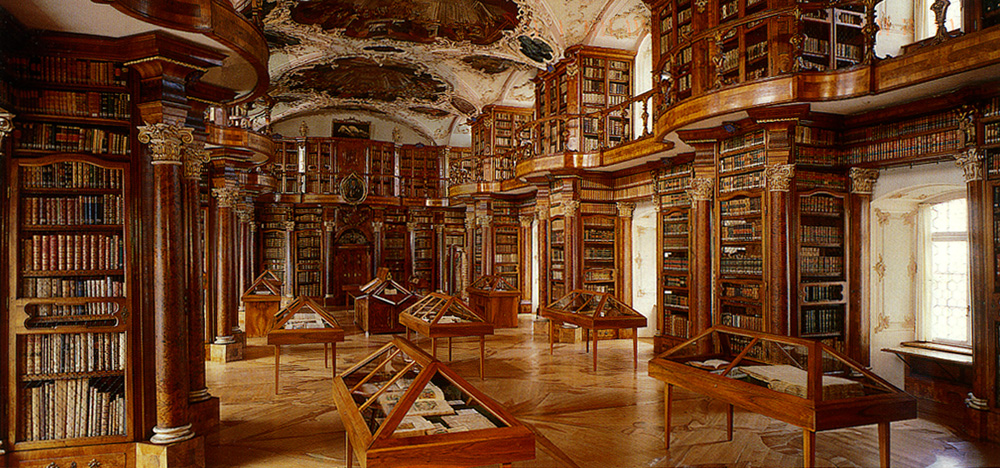
Abbey library of Saint Gall.

Cassiodorus may have been aware of the inception of the library at Monte Cassino under the influence of St. Benedict (LeJay and Otten, "Cassiodorus.") In any event, with the Imperial City increasingly under attack, the locus of library activity shifted increasingly to the rural monastic houses. Benedict supported and energized the place of the library in the community by delegating one or two senior brothers to walk on "patrol" at a set hour, to ensure that no one is engaged in idle chatter, rather than being diligent in his reading. (Thurston, "Libraries," 228-32.)

During the succeeding centuries, such libraries played an increasingly strategic role in defending the tradition of learning from decay, pillage, and even disappearance. By the standards of the later Middle Ages, a monastery collection numbering more than a thousand would have been considered very large. Quality and utility rather than mass were most to be desired. Catalogs varied in complexity and in volume, and "chained books" were common enough to indicate that security was a lively concern.

Typically a large, pillared hall would serve as a reading room, with built-in cupboards to store the books. Carrels for study were often set around the perimeter to utilize available light. An additional floor might house a scriptorium.

The same period saw the flowering of monastic libraries in Britain. Once the Roman occupation ended in the mid-Fifth century, Columba founded the meditation and copying center at Iona off the coast of Scotland. A century later witnessed the arrival of Augustine of Canterbury, sent to England by Gregory the Great, and this set in motion the establishment of greater conformity to the will of Rome on the part of the English church. A side-effect of this harmony was a marked increase in monastic library development in England, and a key figure in this maturing was Benedict Biscop of Wearmouth on the North Sea Coast. In the tradition of Pamphilius and Cassiodorus, Biscop traveled far to get the works he required: "he sought [books] where they were best to be found among the desolate remains of ancient civilization in Italy." (Southern, 168) Most importantly, what he retrieved from the Continent contained everything that was necessary for understanding the main outlines of the Christian learning of the ancient world (Southern, 168). These books supported the scholarship of [Bede], "the greatest example of Benedictine scholarship and of the use to which a Benedictine library can be put." (Southern, 170)

The rise of universities and their libraries was energized greatly by bequests: Bp. Robert Grosseteste to Oxford, Humphrey, Duke of Gloucester to Cambridge, Robert de Sorbon to the University of Paris, etc. The emerging university libraries, small though they may have been at first, rapidly assumed a different function than the monastic libraries. Research activity, rather than copying and preservation, predominated. The advent of new technology - the printing press - in the late 14th century helped take this distinction (the beginnings of a "demand" model) still further.

In France, prior to 1200 all of the major theological schools had all grown up in the environs of cathedrals: St. Victor, Ste. Genevieve, Notre Dame. This association of the cathedral and academy proved to have a decisive influence in determining both where and how theological research and education were to be carried out for centuries to come.

By 1500 there were between 75 and 85 universities in Western Europe. Most began without formal libraries, but over the course of time the user of private tutors' collections in faculties of theology and elsewhere gave way to more methodical and sustainable collection schemes.

== Early Modern Europe ==
=== The Renaissance ===
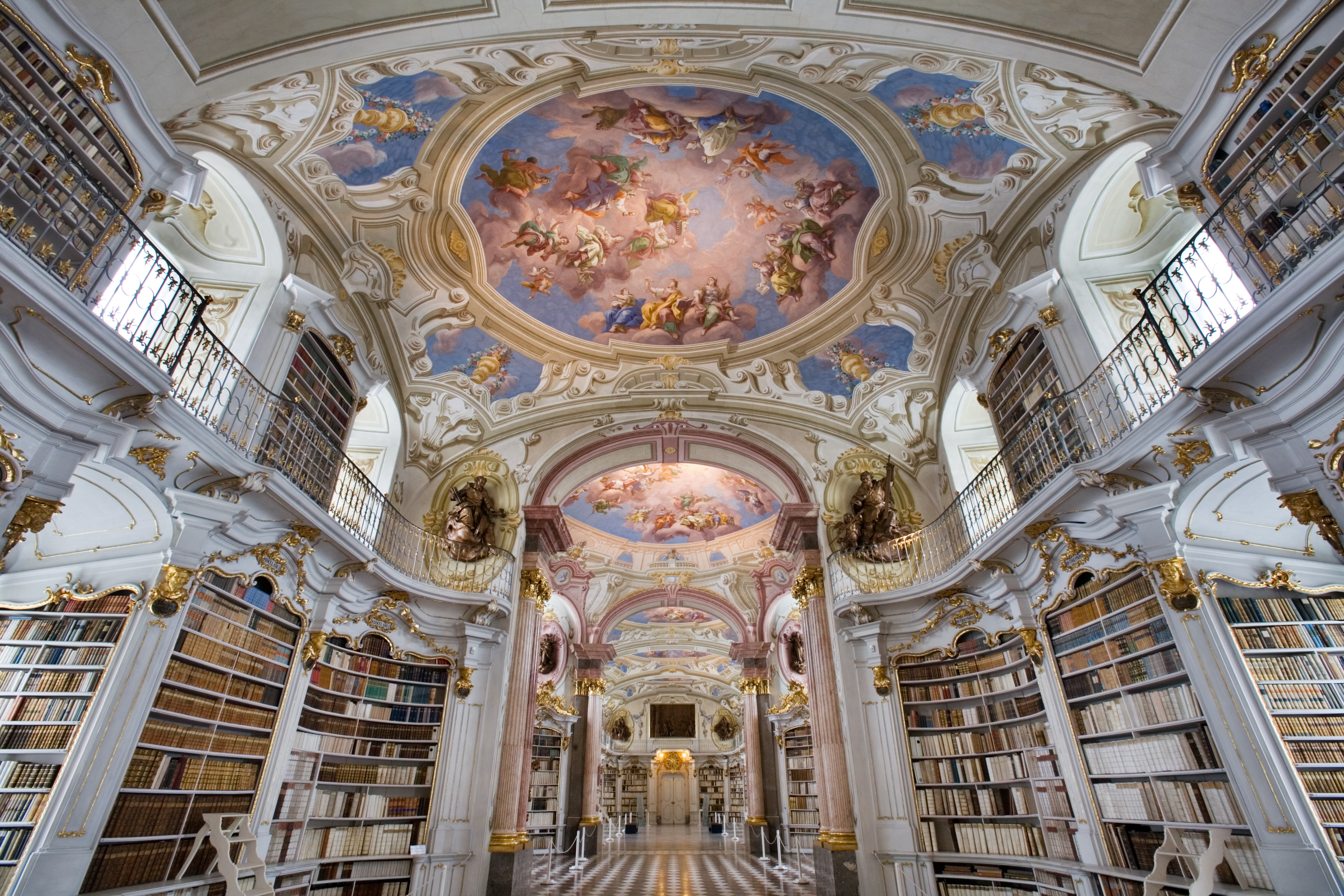
Interior of the Admont Abbey Library.

If the later Middle Ages were characterized by the "rescue and preservation" of Christian texts by monastics on the fringes of the world, the Renaissance (14th-17th centuries) was an era of recovery. The Renaissance brought an appetite more for Greek and Latin classical texts than for Christian works, but the general effect was a positive one for libraries.

The advent of the printing press had a direct and rapid effect on libraries. It offered not only the prospect of more copies of more volumes being on the market, but made the unprecedented range of available editions a consideration: "the desired classics were appearing in versions more reliable than their predecessors because of the Humanist scholarship, and far more stable once in print than anything the manuscript age could have produced."

This change-of-focus showed itself first in Italy: Petrarch, Boccacio, Salutati and others rediscovered, aggressively collected, and copied manuscripts from all-but-lost collections during the 14th century. Significantly, when this appetite turned into something of a "gold-rush", it was almost invariably to places such as the Benedictine library of Monte Cassino where text-hunters turned. For economic and other reasons, Florence became the center of such activity. Across Europe the focus for library expansion and activity became the royal or princely libraries: aggressive activity in collecting, gathering and protecting texts from their scattered locations was characterized by individuals rather than churches or even universities.

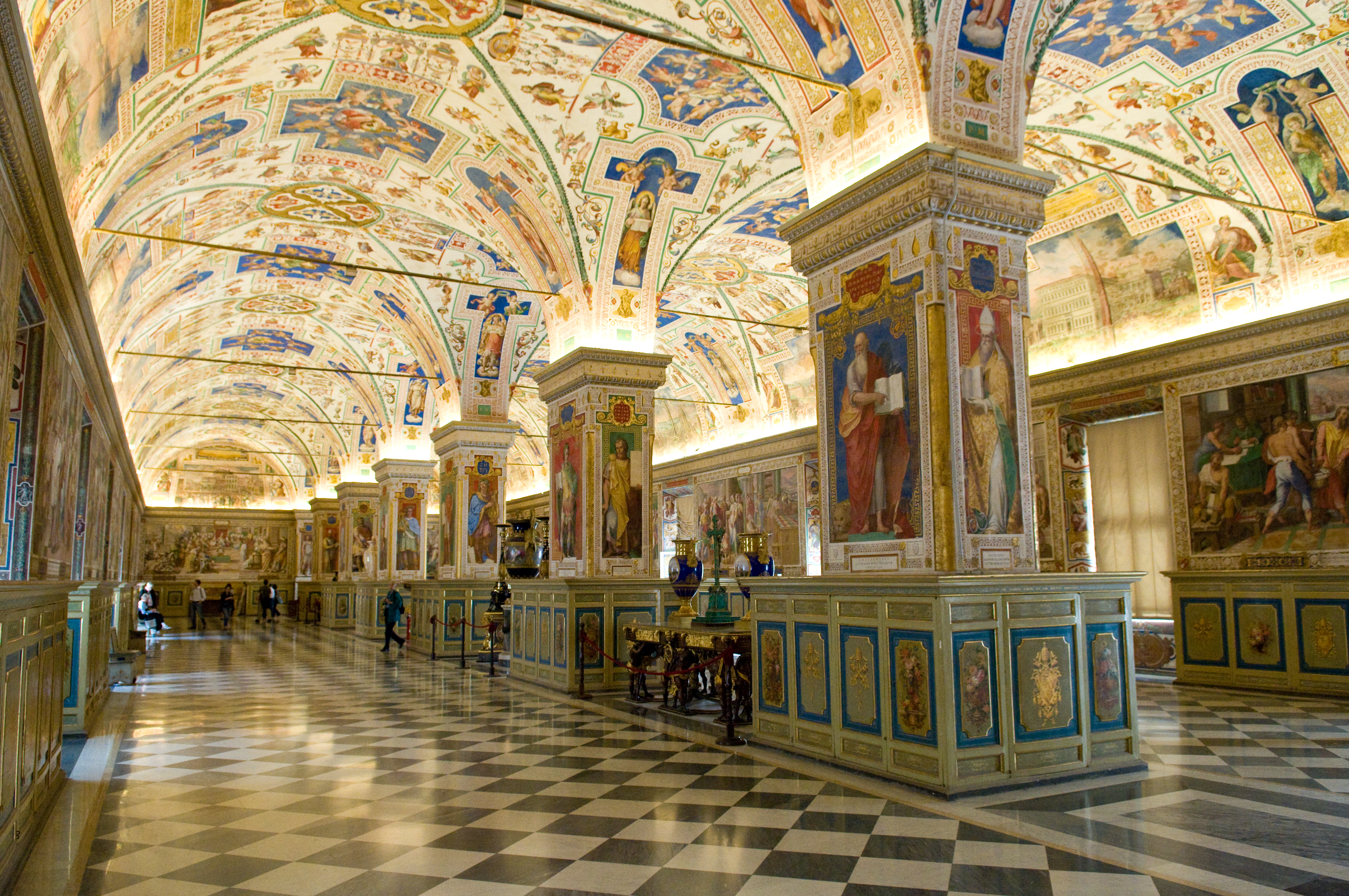
The Sistine Hall of the Vatican Library.

The greatest of these book-hunters were personal agents of wealthy noblemen. Perhaps this is why the greatest legacy for theological librarianship of this essentially humanist cultural movement was the effect it had on the Vatican Library. Its earlier collection had been dispersed during the interval at Avignon, so that on his accession Pope Nicholas found only 350 volumes extant. The library of the Vatican was brought back to health essentially as a combination of personal library collections, such as that of the Duke of Urbino (1120 volumes added to the Vatican Library after his death).

In the Low Countries and in England the effect of the Renaissance was somewhat different: Erasmus in Rotterdam was not only a collector in his own right, but brought together the best of the specifically Christian tradition with the emergent humanism of the Continent.

=== The Protestant Reformation ===
The turmoil generated by the English monarchy's break with Rome in the 16th century had a devastating effect on theological library collections. In Yorkshire alone, for example, under the aegis of various religious orders, there may have been more than fifty abbeys, priories, etc., each of them having at least a modest library. Yet within the space of little more than a generation, this whole structure was dismantled. State-authorized visitations during the reigns of Henry VIII and Edward VI meant the break-up of collections not only in the monasteries but also at the universities as well. Insofar as this process was guided by any principle, it was to suppress that which was medieval and to elevate that which was Classical and Humanist in character. In large measure this had the desired effects of cutting British libraries loose from the literary tradition associated with Rome, and of turning interest toward the Anglo-Saxon church. There is some evidence that the abrupt "change of fashion" in theological literature and learning brought in by the Henrician Reformation had the curious effect of extracting significant portions of monastic collections from purely religious surroundings. So quickly did materials intrinsic to the Catholic tradition become devalued (the monarchy was aggressive and quite ruthless in moving the Church in the direction of Protestant humanism) that it was not uncommon for displaced monks, friars and abbots to be able to take with them, gratis, items from monastic libraries.

Additionally, some private collectors (John Leland, Matthew Parker, William Cecil, Robert Cotton, etc.) were able to save some of the monastic holdings from destruction. It was in the spirit of such private generosity that efforts to overturn the Reformation's more destructive impulses that moved Thomas Bodley to help re-establish the library at Oxford.

Similar currents can be observed in the Continental Reformation, with some books taken from the monasteries moved to Lutheran churches. A more enduring effect was the shift of surviving monastic collections to the universities. Many universities which were founded in the 16th century had their libraries enriched tremendously by works taken from Dominican and Jesuit libraries, especially. Leipzig's collection, for example, received 1,500 manuscripts and 4,000 printed books in this fashion. Basel received the contents of both the city's cathedral library and a nearby Dominican library. This can hardly have been what the monks and scribes had in mind amid their earlier toils, but at least the works lived on in active use. Many libraries suffered damage or disruption during the Thirty Years' War in the 17th century, but in general the 17th and 18th centuries were a period of remarkable growth in theological collections of Continental Europe: again, the uniform trend was away from the cloisters and into the academy.

=== The Enlightenment ===
==== Great Britain ====
Religious dissent in England had the effect of prompting some dissenters to leave for America, where their views on Church, State and education found expression in new colleges. Many of those who remained in England found themselves denied access to the universities by the Acts of Uniformity (1549 and after). Their response was to found their own "academies", 35 of which were established between 1680 and 1780. Library resources for these schools were chiefly supplied by the private collections of the academies' benefactors.

During the same time period were also established endowed libraries for the use of parishioners. In this case it appears that literature was made available to keep readers from lapsing into the "easy moral ways" thought to be characteristic of the Restoration era.

The labors of Rev. Thomas Bray demonstrate how far a "philanthropic" vision for Christian libraries could sometimes extend. It came to Bray's attention that many ministers, both Anglican and Dissenting, in Britain and in the Colonies, simply lacked the means to procure theological books, and were effectively consigned to rural parishes where they were not within reasonable distance of books to borrow. The result was the formulation of "Parochial and Lending Libraries". He drafted a six-page list of titles to be included, and aimed to set up such a collection for every deanery in England, and appealed for donations of books and money to the aristocracy. Eventually the SPCK (which he helped found late in the 17th century) thought well enough of the enterprise to undertake its sponsorship.

The new idea of a regional, or even a lending library of theological literature was taken even further by a Non-Conformist Scot, James Kirkwood, who proposed the support of such ventures with a property tax. Kirkwood won the support of the scientist Robert Boyle for the translation and distribution of Gaelic Bible translations in the north of Scotland. In this formerly deprived region he also helped establish 77 "lending libraries" in the early decades of the 18th century.

==== France ====
By contrast, the paroxysm that rocked France at the end of the 18th century was felt first by the libraries of the Jesuits. Whether impelled by the jealousy of other orders, or whether anti-clerical sentiment was simply an explosion looking for a place to occur, the Jesuits took the brunt. A series of edicts meant to rein in their influence and holdings culminated with the actual dissolution of the order in 1773. Most French universities, having close ties with the Church, did not survive the Revolution. As was the case in the Reformation, their book and manuscript collections were dispersed mostly to university or private libraries, in Vienna, Graz, Innsbruck, etc.

The French Revolution brought similar changes to ecclesiastical libraries, though there seemed to be a more overtly destructive impulse at the root of changes. The idea was to confiscate collections and redistribute them for the benefit of the public. One contemporary estimate put the number of books seized at 12 million. The urge to protect one's own literary property had its effect once again, however, and many of the items made their way into clandestine or private collections.

== North American seminary libraries ==
=== Origin and development ===
Theological collections had almost always been a component part, often indeed the central part, of cathedral or university libraries. In North America this situation was altered forever by several factors:

1. After the Enlightenment, theology was reassessed to the status of one subject of inquiry among many, rather than retaining its place as the "Queen of the Sciences". 2. Emigration to American afforded the opportunity to reconsider the entire system of theological education. 3. In North America, theological education would no longer be driven, dominated or informed by a state church. Other factors – new schools of thought as well as "market forces", personal philanthropy, etc. - would play a stronger role than previously.

It is true that the idea of an independent seminary had occasional antecedents in Europe, but the model that emerged in America was in almost every respect unique. Harvard and Yale and other colleges were established for the training of clergy, but at the time this was not considered to be a specialized and professional education. The lines of demarcation between secular and theological learning were not clear. Of the 400 books donated by John Harvard shortly after the founding of the college, about two thirds were theological, and since the collection's growth depended largely on donations from clergy, this proportion did not change rapidly. The Harvard "shelf-list" was compared with a recommended-list of the time, Richard Baxter's Christian Directory, which indicated that the collection at Harvard was at best meager. (Baxter, as well as Samuel Willard's Brief Directions to a Young Scholar, Cotton Mather's' Manductio ad Ministerium, Directions for a Candidate of the Ministry, and Jonathan Edwards's The Preacher, as Discourse ... to which is added a Catalogue of Some Authors were some of the conspectuses for theological literature which were used at the time.)

In 18th-century America, consensus on theology and theological training came under considerable strain. Traditionally, it was thought that theological training was best carried out through a rigorous program in academic subjects. But revivalist trends outside the academy and theological ferment within it led to increasing distrust.

The option of personal apprenticeship in the home of a respected clergyman—what came to be called the "Schools of the Prophets"–-grew in popularity in the aftermath of the Second Great Awakening (1740 and after) Joseph Bellamy of Bethlehem, CT, was probably the best example: his personal library consisted of approximately 100 books and at least 350 pamphlets (an essential medium for "broadcasting" sermons at the time). There is some irony in the fact that, though it removed many of the best divinity students from the academy, this "unorthodox" approach produced more than its share of highly learned pastors, on the strength of the erudition of the "Prophets", the power of example, and perhaps sometimes of the quality of their personal libraries.

This "un-orthodox" trend in the training of Protestant ministers helped prepare the ground for another development in theological libraries: the institution of "free-standing" schools of theology. Some of these (Harvard, Yale) remained affiliated with the original colleges, others (Andover, Princeton, Pittsburgh) became independent entities. Some remained independent but affiliated with a larger institution (Union Theological Seminary with Columbia University). But what is of signal importance in all cases is that here were assembled collections for theology and divinity and nothing else. Again, donations of private theological collections provided the foundation Several seminary libraries were formed on this basis by the end of the 18th century (New Brunswick, Service Seminary in PA, St. Mary's-Baltimore). The first part of the 19th century saw excellent theological collections being gathered at Andover (later merged with the Harvard Divinity Collection), Hartford (sold much later to Candler School of Theology at Emory University), Yale, Auburn/Union in New York (the Burke Library would later merge under the Columbia University Libraries system), Colgate-Rochester (and subsequent mergers from Bexley Hall and Crozer Theological Seminary), General, Drew, Princeton, Gettysburg, St. Charles Borromeo, etc. In the Midwest, the St. Mary of the Lake Seminary was founded in 1844, and on the west coast what is now the Pacific School of Religion came into existence in 1866.

=== Situation in the nineteenth and twentieth centuries ===
In North America, both denominational and non-denominational schools of theology had seen remarkable proliferation by the middle of the 19th century. When, in 1924, the first comprehensive study of ministerial education was undertaken, 161 Protestant schools were listed. This number had increased to 224 only a decade later. In his important survey of theological libraries in 1930, Yale's Raymond Morris indicated that theological libraries ranged in collections from a few hundred volumes up to almost 200,000. This was impressive numerical growth, but he found that libraries were almost always under-supported financially, with repercussions being felt in collections, facilities and staffing.

Within the Catholic communion in North America, growth patterns had also been phenomenal. An overview in 1960 listed 93 diocesan seminaries (50 considered "major"), as well as 294 "houses of study", with a total of almost 20,000 students in preparation. While at that time none of the Catholic collections were on the same scale as the largest Protestant libraries, many contained more than 100,000 items.

It is clear now that by the time the surveys by Beach and Harrington were carried out (1960), a watershed had been crossed, and that demographics of theological education and of church attendance were in the process of rapid change. Among Catholic seminaries, the number of candidates for the priesthood has fallen drastically in the past thirty years (by 2/3, according to some estimates). On the Protestant side, while the overall number of students has remained strong, at the same time attendance patterns have been in sharp decline, and this has drastically reduced the number of graduates who end up serving in parishes. The second half of the 20th century contrasted sharply with the first, and the number of theological colleges and libraries had grown too quickly and too broadly to correspond with trends in the last three decades of the century. This has posed enormous, complex challenges for seminaries and their librarians: serious dislocation, and too many unevenly distributed schools.

=== The Character of present-day collections ===
The magnificent wealth of resources now in evidence is the result of a complex and lengthy development process. Which is another way of saying that there have been slightly different routes taken to attain the caliber enjoyed by many collections today. Some have relied principally on rapid denominational growth (which generated demand for clergy and brought in funding required from denominations and benefactors); some have prospered from the skill and vision of exceptional library leadership; some libraries have built their reputations on exquisite collections purchased and then donated by private individuals; still others have excelled in cultivating niche collections or services.

The individual collections are unique, and the product of many sets of circumstances, so summarizing adequately here would be difficult. (Though dated, earlier overviews by Allison, Walker, Gapp, and Hadidian still provide useful outlines of the distinctive strengths of most collections. A useful, centralized source for current information on seminaries and their libraries is American Theological Library Association index

As the 21st century begins, it is fair to say that the legacy remains strong, but the structure which supports it is showing signs of strain.

For example:

- Decline in church membership within many denominations.
- The smaller number of students in seminary (and the tuition revenue they contribute).
- The steadily increasing costs of adding to collections, which makes it difficult for all but a few libraries to maintain acquisitions budgets.
- The rapid incursion of Communications Technology and Electronic Resources is beginning to call into question the continued need for physical library collections.
- The growing demand for distance-learning programs pushes the seminary to reconfigure the way it offers access to course materials.

No one can predict what effect these developments might have on theological libraries in the 21st century. In cases where the parent institutions have found it impossible to remain in operation, libraries have been sold intact or dispersed. Where there are a number of reasonably compatible schools in a specific area, on some occasions libraries have been merged outright, or retained separate libraries but established a consortial arrangement. In the latter case, efficiencies result from reciprocal borrowing privileges and from avoiding duplicate acquisitions where possible.

It seems a foregone conclusion that there will be further such retrenchments in the coming years, quite likely on a more widespread basis. With trends like these emerging in recent years, the role of the American Theological Library Association (founded 1947) has been of vital importance. The primary function of the association has been to offer coordination and support of theological library activity in the US and Canada.

ATLA's other notable contributions have been the development and production of the Religion Indexes (1949 ff.) in print and more recently in electronic versions, its preservation initiatives in assembling core theological collections in microform (1973 and after).

The most recent initiative from ATLA has been the ATLAS serials project, which will bring fifty key theological periodicals to market in an alternative, electronic format. ATLA has ongoing relationships with sister agencies, such as the CONSEIL (International Council of Theological Library Associations) and ANZTLA (Australian and New Zealand Theological Library Association).

== The twentieth century and beyond: growth, retrenchment, redefinition ==
Depending upon one's perspective, trends during the 20th century can be seen as evidence of a bright or an uncertain future for theological libraries.

In Europe, by the end of the 19th century theological education and training for the ministry had come almost universally under the auspices of the universities. Among other things this usually meant the demise of discrete theological collections within separate facilities, though this did not necessarily mean the devaluation of such collections. Indeed, it is fair to say that as the 20th century opened, not only the finest theological collections but the most erudite and distinguished centers of theological research were in Germany and in Britain (Heidelberg, Tübingen, Göttingen, Berlin, Oxford and Cambridge, to name only a few).

What no one could have predicted was the devastation brought by wars, from the beginning to the end of the century. The University of Nancy in France lost its library in 1914, as did Louvain in the same year. Great libraries of theology at Monte Cassino, at Dresden, and at Caen were wrecked in 1944. As recently as 1992 the state library at Sarajevo fell victim to a rocket attack. The numerical losses here and elsewhere were high: Hamburg and Frankfurt each lost 600,000 vols., Würzburg 350,000, and so on.

Political as well as military upheavals have had an adverse effect on European theological library collections and activity. Libraries in Eastern Europe illustrate this vividly: collection priorities in places such as Jena, Rostock and Leipzig could hardly be said to have been favorable to theological research during the years 1945-1990. Moreover, since the reunification of the two German states, the massive amounts of money and personnel which it would take to bring theological collections back to acceptable standards has not been easy to come by. Nevertheless, these challenging conditions have led to significant co-operation between libraries, particularly through BETH - the European Theology Libraries Association.

Of all Continental theological collections, few managed to navigate the various catastrophes of the century better than the Vatican Library. Steadily enriched by a sequence of outstanding gifts over several centuries, even the French Revolution and the Napoleonic Era did little lasting harm. By the end of the 19th century, the library encompassed close to half a million books, and tens of thousands of manuscripts. Several of the Popes (Leo XIII and Pius XI) have taken a keen and active interest in the library, and great effort and expense has been taken to ensure that the collections not only continue to grow but are well cared-for. Like many of Europe's great theological libraries, bibliographic searching is now enabled globally via the Internet. Increasingly, well-financed libraries such as the Vatican's are working aggressively to develop plans for uploading digital versions of some of their treasures (most often archival materials) onto web-servers.

== Summary ==
This overview has demonstrated that the role and function of theological libraries have always been characterized by continuity amid turmoil, resourcefulness amid frequently inadequate resources, and advocacy of that which is of lasting value within a setting of constant ecclesiastical, societal and political change. In the words of Cassiodorus:

We aim both to preserve what is old and to build something new; we desire to raise up things that are modern without diminishing the works of our ancestors. (cited in Southern, 169)

Only on very rare occasions have the legacy and contributions of theological libraries been noticed, and then usually long after the fact. (Thomas Cahill's How the Irish Saved Civilization provides a pleasant exception.) But lasting acclaim is quite beside the point: from Pamphilius of Caesarea onward, theological libraries have most often been energized by the efforts of those who savor a degree of anonymity.

The "Age of Information" is commonly considered as posing a dire threat (or at least a plausible alternative) to the perpetuity of printed texts and paper-based library collections. But of course it also holds out the promise of unprecedented collaboration between the excellent collections and the astute librarians who work in them. Hence there is reason for hope that the best days for theological libraries are not in the past but in the future.

Stewart, David (2001). "Christian Libraries". International Dictionary of Library Histories. Vol. 1. London: Fitzroy Dearborn. pp. 48–54.

== List of Online Christian Libraries ==
- The Vatican Library
- The Post-Reformation Digital Library
- Online Library of Liberty
- The NTS Library
- The Evangelical Christian Library
- The Library of the Saints
- Christian Classics Ethereal Library
