= Llanrothal =

Village in Herefordshire, England

Coordinates: 51.862599°N 2.763799°W

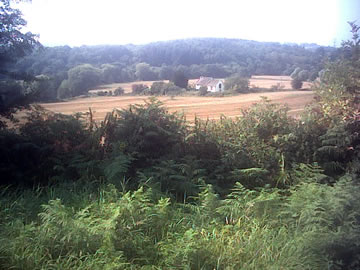
- View of the remote church of St John the Baptist's

- Location within Herefordshire
- Unitary authority: Herefordshire
- Ceremonial county: Herefordshire
- Region: West Midlands
- Country: England
- Sovereign state: United Kingdom
- Post town: Monmouth
- Postcode district: NP25
- Police: West Mercia
- Fire: Hereford and Worcester
- Ambulance: West Midlands
- UK Parliament: Hereford and South Herefordshire

Llanrothal is a small village and historical parish in Herefordshire, England in the Monnow Valley, on the border with Monmouthshire, Wales. The River Monnow flows near here along the border. The village is located 5 miles (8 km) by road northwest of Monmouth. It contains a 12th-century church, St John the Baptist's which stands in a remote position close to the England–Wales border overlooking the river.

Llanrothal Court, in the village, is an early 14th-century hall house, with cross-wings added in the 15th or 16th century and further additions from the 17th, 19th and 20th centuries. It is a Grade II listed building.

Another historically important building in the village is The Cwm. Originally a shooting box, and subsequently a farmhouse, it is also Grade II listed, together with the terrace in front of the house, and the retaining wall to the side, which contains rare bee boles. The present building, dating from about the 1830s, is on the site and incorporates part of a demolished 17th-century house that was a Jesuit province and college.

The name Llanrothal may possibly derive from the Welsh "Ridol's church", perhaps after Saint Ruald/Roald or the personal name Hrodwald.

== History ==
During the 17th century religious persecution of the Catholic Church in Wales, Llanrothal was a secret stronghold of outlawed Jesuits and Recusant Welsh gentry such as Henry Milbourne, who resided in the village and whose family worshipped at The Cwm in the 17th century. In the early 17th century the house became the headquarters of the Jesuit mission in South Wales and remained an important Catholic centre until its discovery and sacking by the Bishop of Hereford in 1678, in the anti-Catholic backlash following the Popish Plot. William Vychan, or William the Younger, also lived at Llanrothal, although he is also associated with Penrhyn, in Caernarfonshire.

Throughout its history, the village has been associated with nearby Welsh Newton, and today they together form the Welsh Newton Llanrothal Group Parish Council.

== Sources ==
- Pevsner, Nikolaus (2003). Herefordshire. The Buildings of England. Yale University Press. ISBN 0-300-09609-7.
