= Llangrove =

Village in Herefordshire, England

Coordinates: 51.869403°N 2.688282°W

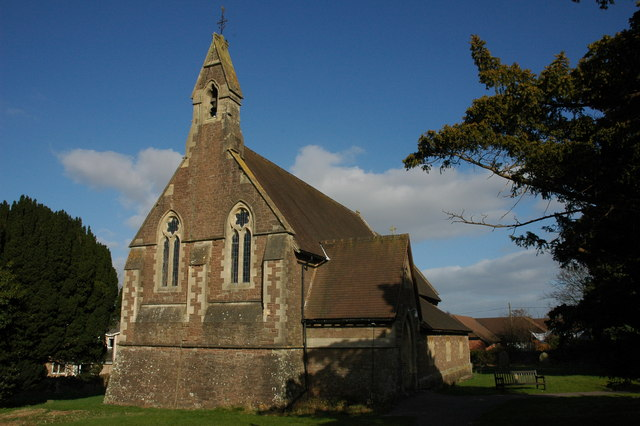
- Christ Church

- Location within Herefordshire
- Civil parish: Llangarron
- Unitary authority: Herefordshire
- Ceremonial county: Herefordshire
- Region: West Midlands
- Country: England
- Sovereign state: United Kingdom
- Post town: Ross-on-Wye
- Postcode district: HR9
- Police: West Mercia
- Fire: Hereford and Worcester
- Ambulance: West Midlands
- UK Parliament: Hereford and South Herefordshire

Llangrove is a small village in the civil parish of Llangarron, located in southwestern part of Herefordshire, England. It lies approximately seven miles from both Ross-on-Wye in Herefordshire and Monmouth in Monmouthshire,Wales.

The village contains a pub (The Royal Arms), a church of England primary school (Llangrove CE Academy), a village hall and an Anglican Christ Church. It formerly had a shop and a post office.

The village of Llangrove has been known by many different names and spellings over time, including Langrove, Longrove, Longgrove, Longuegroue, Long-grove, Long Grove. The earliest documented form, from 1372, is “Longegroue”, for example in reference to underwood of 100 acres. Later, the early parish registers of Llangarron recorded Long Grove. Later, the early parish registers of Llangarron recorded Long Grove.In 1862, a local directory referred to 'Llangrove Common'. Parish records (from before there was a church at Llangrove) record the burial of Elizabeth Evans of the Grove. Older residents recalled living on the Grove.

Llangrove is not a 'traditional village' built around a village green; instead, its centre is marked by the church, the war memorial and the school. The village is sited on high ground. To the north, on clear days, there are uninterrupted views of the Malverns Hills and around to May Hill. To the south, the outlook takes in one can see Symonds Yat and the Doward, extending round to Welsh Newton Common, and westwards towards to Garway and the Brecon hills.

== History ==
The parish of Llangrove is of relatively recent formation, having been carved out of Llangarron in 1856–7. The land for the building of the church and the school was given by Mrs Marriott, the lady of the manor of Goodrich. The fact that she owned land in the centre of the village reflects the fact that the populated centre of Llangrove has been largely formed upon land which was originally a common belonging to the lord of the manor of Goodrich. Extensive encroachment settlement took place on this common, and the adjacent one of Old Grove from the 17th C onwards, though mostly in the later 18th C & 19th C. By the time of the formation of the new parish, there were many souls in need of a nearer church than the parish church at Llangarron, though there was already a non-conformist element. Long Grove and Old Grove commons were enclosed with the consent of the manor's ‘meese’ tenants after proposals were initiated in 1815.

The original name of the common was Long Grove, and in 1372 it is mentioned as ‘Longegroue’ with ‘Douwarth’ as underwood ‘containing 100acres; it is made into charcoal every ninth year, and is then worth 10l.’ Old Grove is not mentioned separately at this early date. Old Grove is typical of the wooded commons within the manor of Goodrich, being steeply sloping uncultivatable land. Long Grove is different, mostly being relatively flat land although somewhat exposed at around 140m above sea level. It bears a resemblance in situation to Garway common, which has remained largely undeveloped. Perhaps this is a reflection of the easier attitude to encroachment of Goodrich manor, provided (of course) that the encroachers paid their fines in lieu of rent. Together, Old Grove and Long Grove covered about 124 acres in 1718.

=== Wellington Bomber Crash ===
On 7 July 1942, a Wellington bomber (T2962) on a training flight from Edgehill, near Banbury, crash-landed in Llangrove after two of its engines failed. It ended up in a field opposite Christ Church in the village, only narrowly avoiding the church and school. Two of the six crewmen were killed: Pilot Sgt F. H. S. Bush from London, and Observer Sgt R. J. McKean from Glasgow. Other crew members Sgt LC Baker, Sgt TG Baycroft, Sgt A Hill and Sgt HA Hill were all injured in the crash.

The Revd Frank Easton, who had been the Vicar since 1936, rushed to assist the crew, but had a heart attack and died as he cycled home afterwards. He was 59. Sarah Watkins, the church organist, also collapsed and died of heart failure on the way to the crash scene.

A memorial plaque was unveiled 3 October 2010 in Christ Church Llangrove.

== Churches and Chapels of Llangrove ==
=== Christ Church ===
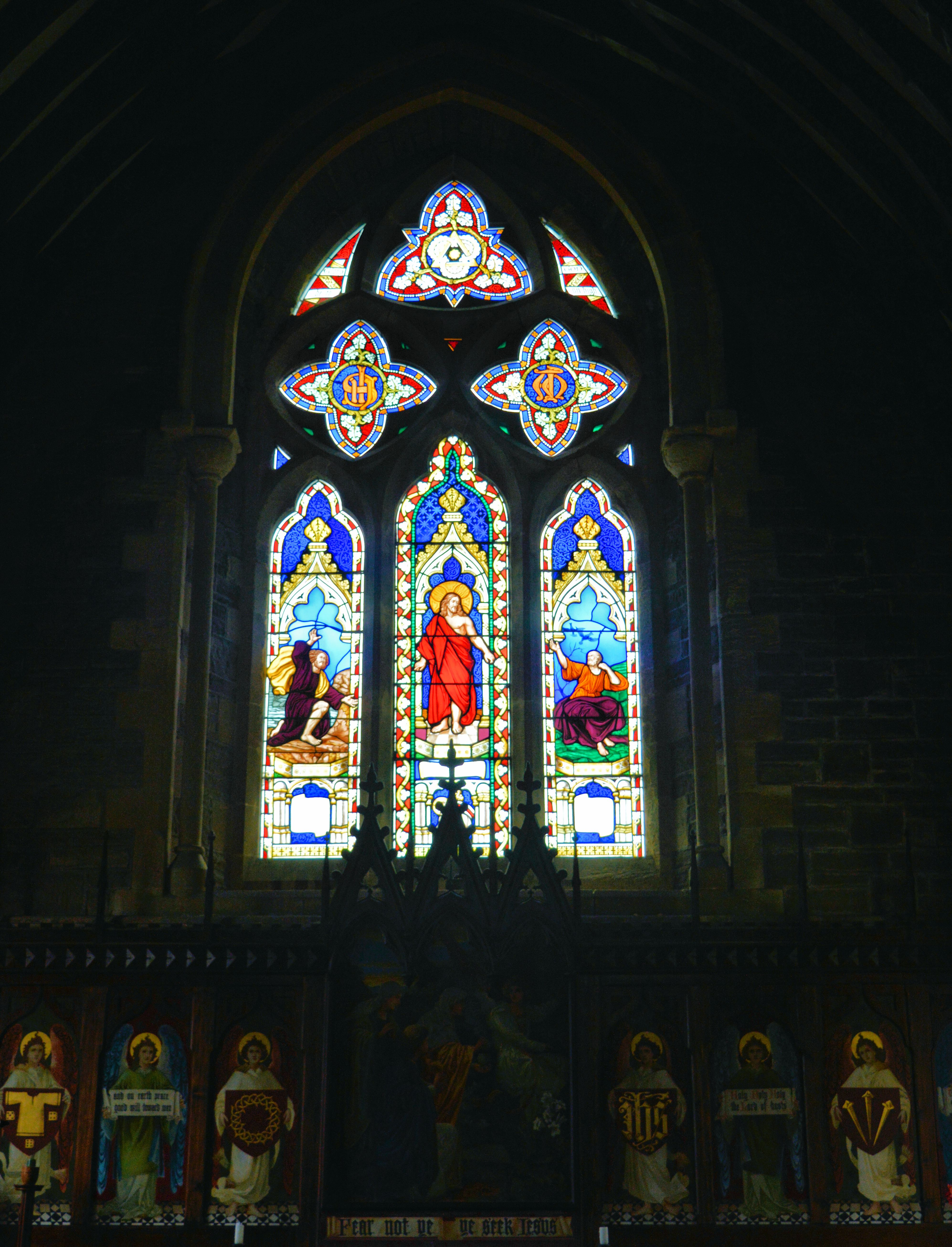
Stained glass in Christ Church

Christ Church is currently the only active church within Llangrove. It is located in the village centre on the main route through the village. Built between 1854 and 1856, it is the first complete church building to be designed by George Frederick Bodley (1827–1907) who went on to become one of the major architects of the Victorian Gothic revival. Coursed and square sandstone rubble, ashlar dressings, C20 tiled roof. Nave, south porch and south aisle, chancel. In the style of c1300. Four-bay nave: three windows with 2-trefoiled lights to south aisle; lean-to roof east of gabled porch. Gabled bell cote to west end. Two-bay chancel with one window of 2-trefoil headed lights and cinquefoil in roundel with hoodmold to west and 3-light window to east with trefoils and cusping to outer lights flanking central trefoil headed light with trefoil roundel above, hoodmold, central stepped buttress and diagonal buttressing to east end. Interior: nave: trussed rafter roof. Open wagon roof to chancel; south arcade: three bays, simple chamfered piers without capitals.

The land was given by Mrs Catherine Marriott, Lady of the Manor of Goodrich, so that the new church could be built. She paid for the whole cost of building and furnishing, about £1,500.

Christ Church is also a Grade II listed building.

=== Glynston Chapel ===
Glynston Chapel was a church situated in Chapel Meadow, adjacent to the road to Welsh Newton Common on the edge of Llangrove and was a Chapel of Worship. It is believed that there were never any wedding or funerals carried out in the chapel. There are no remains today but mention was made of it in the 17th century as Glynstons Chapill. In 1816 ruins of a chapel called Gluistons Chapel were recorded. In September 1989 a parched area 29 paces into the meadow. This was apparently visible on a level area a few yards north of a line of an old watercourse, c12' wide, 20' long, area then widened c18-26' & about 22' long giving an overall length of c42'. The chapel is thought to have stood until the Black Death after which it fell into decline.

=== Congregational Chapel ===
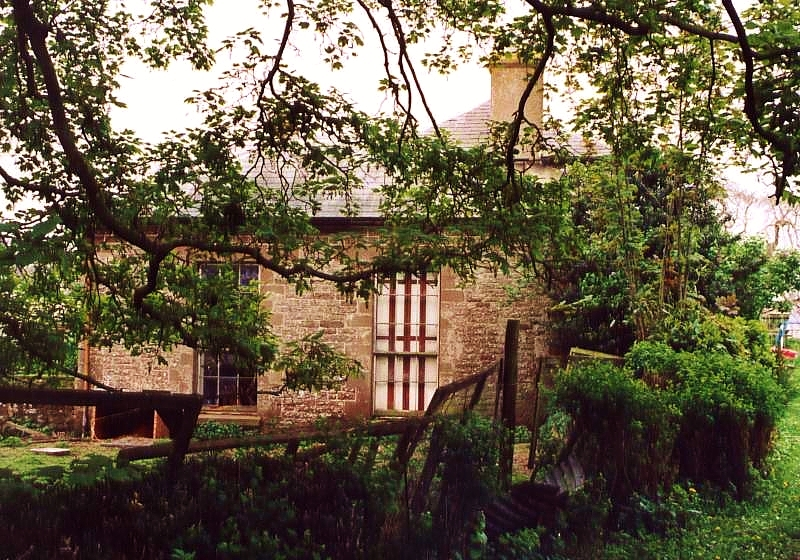
Chapel remains

Former non-conformist chapel adjoining former rectory (Llangrove Cottage qv). c1840. Built of coursed and squared sandstone rubble with ashlar dressings and a hipped slate roof. Rectangular shaped building adjoining Llangrove Cottage to west, north entrance, moulded cornice and string course, cast iron canopy supported on four pillars to entrance, semi-circular headed doorway with fanlight and panelled doors. Two windows to west side with flat arches, stone heads with keystones and glazing bar sash windows. Interior consists of panelled shutters to windows and panelled dado and central cupola.

Llangrove Cottage was bought by the Reverend John Jones who added a large room which was used for public worship and it became known as the Langrove Congregational Church. In the garden, it is said lie several gravestones and somewhere under the front doorway is the Jones family vault where some of the family, and the children who died young, are buried.

This ceased to be a place of worship 20 October 1968. It remains on its old site in a farmyard. It obtained Grade II Listed Building status on 3 July 1985.

=== Methodist Chapel ===
This has ceased to be a place of worship 23 June 1968 and has been converted into a dwelling.

== Dwellings ==
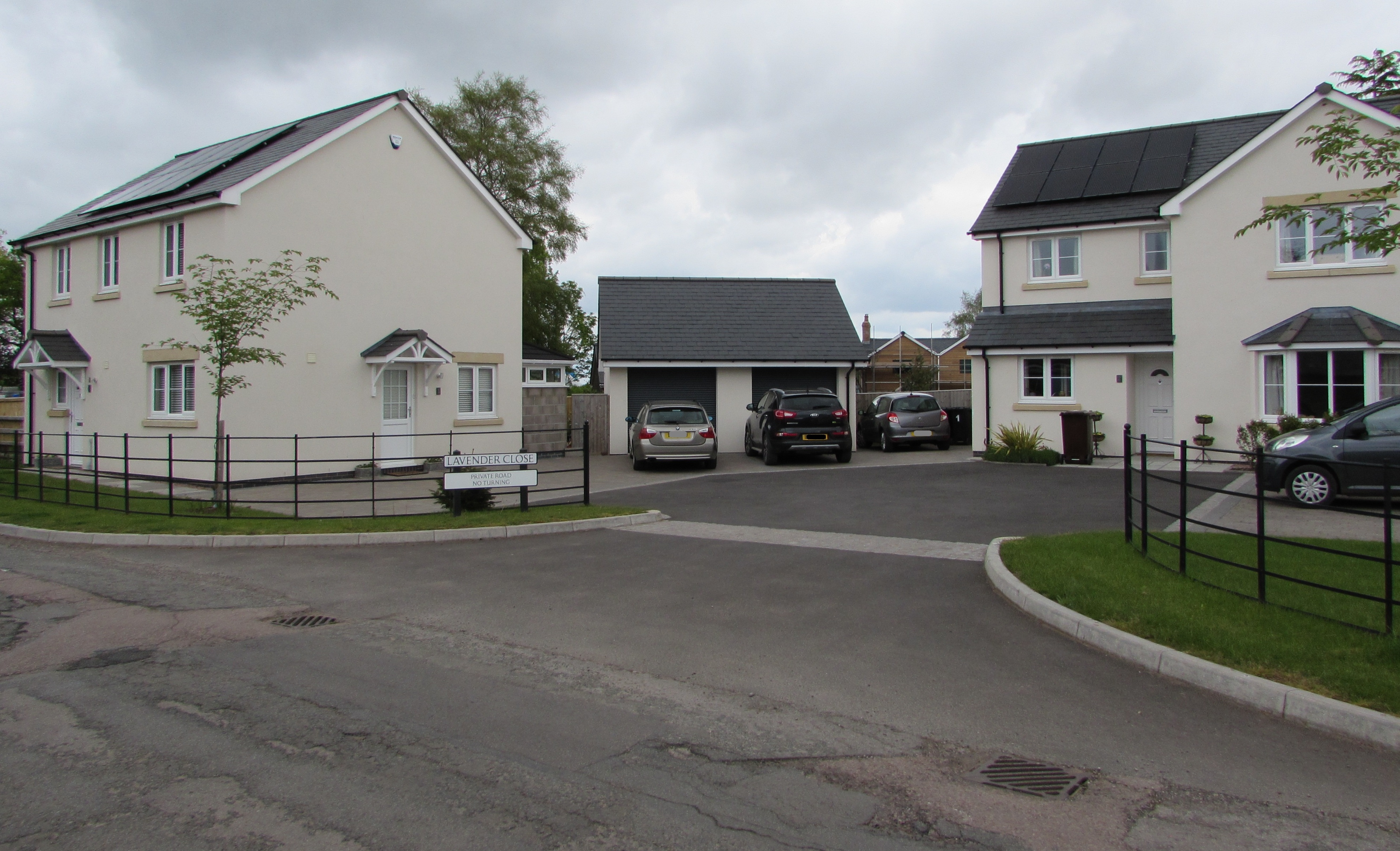
Lavender Close

The village consists of a number of old cottages, small farmhouses, bungalows and modern housing; much of the building has taken place in the last few years. The housing is mainly along the minor road that leads through the village.

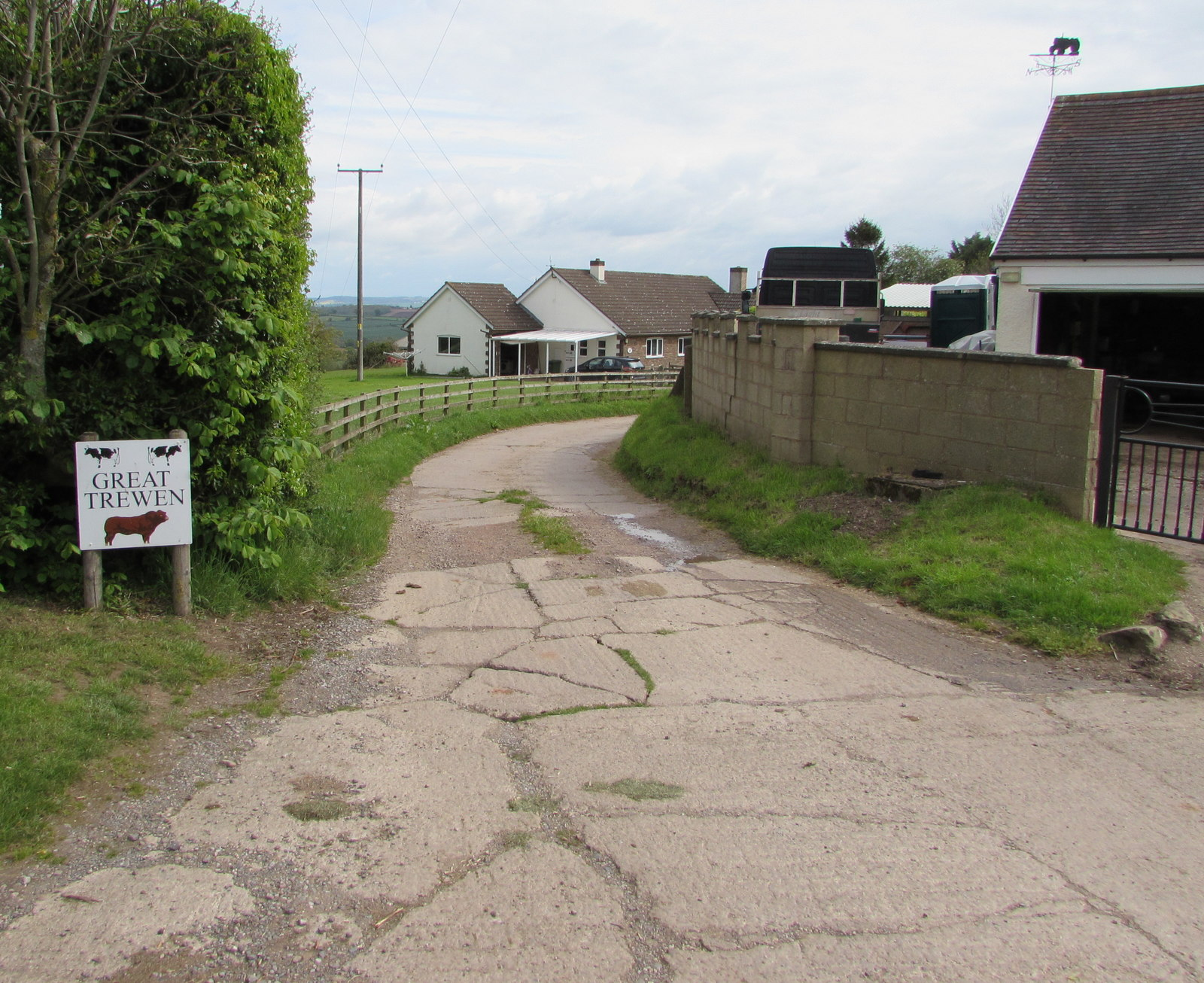
Great Trewen Farm

The tiny hamlet of Trewen lies just outside the village. It consists of Great Trewen, Symond's Trewen, Little Trewen, Trewen Cottage and Trewen farm. There was an old house at Great Trewen, pre-Elizabathan era, which has sadly burned down, but it is thought that it was whitewashed and so the hamlet was named Trewen; gwyn, from which wen comes, meaning white. There still remains an old barn whose beams and crucks are said to have come from oaks in the Forest of Dean; some of the beams are reputed to be old ships' timbers.

Many of the old cottages in Llangrove are built end-on to the lane; this was so that residents did not have to step out of their front doors onto the muddy lane.

Cobblers Cottage is an example of the typical small dwellings that originally existed in the village, built probably around the middle of the 18th century,. It is the last surviving intact building of its kind in the village (the only other surviving cottage is derelict, fronting the grounds of Llangrove House). It is named after the occupation of a former inhabitant who is reputed to have lived there with his wife and six children. The cobbler worked under a tarpaulin at the front of the house and his children slept in the loft. The surrounding grounds would have originally been a smallholding providing fresh meat and vegetables for the family. The cottage is now an outbuilding in the grounds of a house called Breamore.

== Listed Buildings ==
Listed Buildings in Llangrove are the former Congregational Chapel, the adjoining Llangrove Cottage, Christ Church and Llangrove War Memorial. On the outskirts of the village two other listed buildings are the Cow Shed at The Grove and the Barn at The Grove, both of which have now been converted into accommodation. Beyond the village to the west four properties have listed status, Great Trewen Farmhouse, Barn at Great Trewen Farm, Ragged House and Ruxton Court.

Llangrove Cottage gained Grade II Listed Building status on 3 July 1985. Former rectory, now farmhouse. Dated 1824. Ashlar, rendered to rear, brick stacks, hipped slate roof. Two rooms deep with rear service wing forming T-plan with former congregational chapel (qv) adjoining to west. Main central entrance and stairwell, end stacks. Two storeys, three windows: glazing bar sashes, central gabled porch, partly-glazed C19 door. Interior: contemporary ramped staircase.

=== Llangrove War Memorial ===
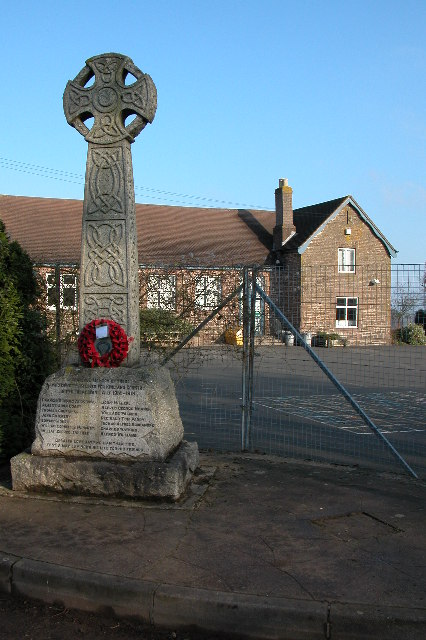
Memorial by the school

Llangrove War Memorial is situated in the centre of the village at the eastern gate to the church and one of the school entrances at the junction of Church Lane. It is listed at Grade II for the following two principal reasons, firstly historic interest as an eloquent witness to the tragic impact on the local community of the events of the First World War, secondly for architectural interest since the memorial is a dignified and sombre Celtic-style cross, neatly made and well-proportioned.

==== History ====
The aftermath of the First World War saw the biggest single wave of public commemoration ever with tens of thousands of memorials erected across England. This was the result of both the huge impact on communities of the loss of three quarters of a million British lives, and also the official policy of not repatriating the dead: therefore the memorials provided the main focus of the grief felt at this great loss. One such memorial was raised at Llangrove as a permanent testament to the sacrifice made by the members of the local community who lost their lives in the First World War.

==== Details ====
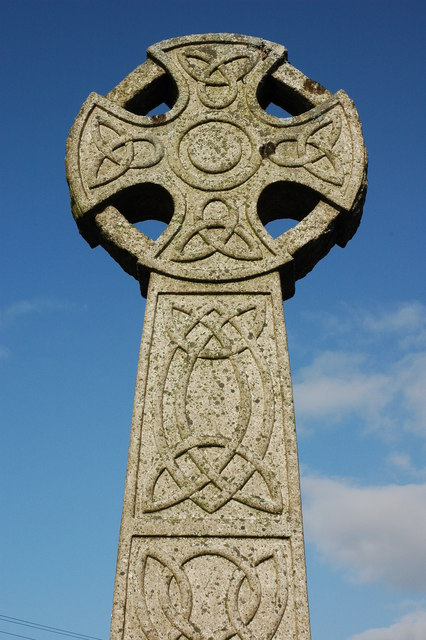
Celtic details on the cross

A First World War memorial, dating from around 1920. The memorial is constructed of stone. The memorial stands in a prominent roadside location in front of the primary school and a short distance from Christ Church (Grade II).

The memorial comprises a tall Celtic wheel-cross with tapering shaft on a tapering rectangular pedestal and single-stepped base. The face and shaft of the cross are decorated with carved interlace.

The main inscription in leaded lettering on the south face of the plinth reads:

IN GRATEFUL MEMORY OF THESE

WHO GAVE THEIR LIVES FOR KING AND COUNTRY

IN THE GREAT WAR. A.D. 1914 – 1918

(14 NAMES)

GREATER LOVE HATH NO MAN THAN THIS,

THAT A MAN LAY DOWN HIS LIFE FOR HIS FRIENDS

== Notable people ==
=== Authors ===
The village has several published authors:

Simon Jones - The transit of Mercury

Julia Sutherland - The Tug of War

Karen Wren - The Forest of Dean, The Wye Valley -, The Best of Herefordshire's Golden Valley & Welsh Borderland, The Elan Valley - a Photographic Tour, Caring for your Companion Pet Rabbit - a Guide for Grown-Ups: The ultimate rabbit-owner's manual to help you provide the best for your furry friend.

Caroline Davis Hayward - My Garland of Verses, A Selection of Poems

=== Singers ===
Catherine King, mezzo-soprano, studied at Trinity College Cambridge and the Guildhall School of Music.

=== Awards ===
==== Dame Commander of the Order of the British Empire ====
Dame Sumeshni Tranka DBE (Sue Tranka) is a South African-born nurse and healthcare administrator serving as the Chief Nursing Officer (CNO) for Wales since August 2021. She is the first person from a minority ethnic background to hold a chief nurse position in the United Kingdom.

==== Order of the British Empire ====
Air Commodore (Retired) Vivian (Viv) Warrington OBE - learnt to fly during National Service with the RAF from 1952 to 1954. On completion of his National Service he went to university and, after graduating, he re-joined the RAF in 1957 on a permanent engagement. He has flown a variety of aircraft but principally the Canberra and Vulcan bombers. He has served in Cyprus, Germany and Belgium, plus nearly 10 years in Lincolnshire (often referred to in the RAF as 'Bomber County'!), and has travelled widely on service deployments. His postings have included CO of No 617 Squadron (The Dambusters), Station Commander of RAF Scampton and Deputy United Kingdom Military Representative at the NATO Headquarters in Brussels. He retired early from the RAF in 1988 and took up the appointment of Director of Protocol in the Hong Kong Government. He retired finally following the transfer of sovereignty over Hong Kong to The People's Republic of China in 1997.

Brigadier (Retired) Martin Vine OBE served in the Gloucestershire Regiment and was their last Commanding Officer before amalgamation in 1994. He is a past Honorary Colonel of the Herefordshire & Worcestershire ACF and Rifles County Colonel Herefordshire.

==== British Empire Medal ====
Mrs. Wendy Price, Manager and Supervisor, Llangrove Leapfrogs Childcare and Girl Guide Leader, Ross-on-Wye, Herefordshire. For services to Children, Young People and Families. (The London Gazette, 29 December 2012, Supplement: 60367, Page: 32)

Mrs. Agnes Lawrence. Agnes was left a widow at the age of 28 with four small children and another baby on the way. She undertook the delivery of the daily and Sunday newspapers in the village and surrounding area while her children were at school and a neighbour looked after her baby son. The newspapers had to be collected from a village three miles away and delivered to a very scattered community. She also delivered the mail. For 54 years, come rain, sun, wind or snow, Mrs Lawrence never failed to deliver the mail, still on foot. Agnes was also employed as school caretaker and cleaner, and she cleaned the church and rang the bell for 43 years. In 1969 she was awarded the BEM which was presented to her by Colonel J. F. Maclean, the Lord Lieutenant of the county. Agnes died in 1975 aged 86. After her death her daughter, Mary, recalled the times during the dreadful winters of 1940 and 1946 when the snow was as high as the hedges, but still she and her mother got the mail and newspapers delivered.

== Amenities ==
The village hall is located opposite the village school and was built in 1960. The parish has scout and brownie groups.

Herefordshire Wildlife Trust has a nature reserve on the edge of the village. The village is close to the Wye Valley an Area of Outstanding Natural Beauty (AONB)

=== Public House ===
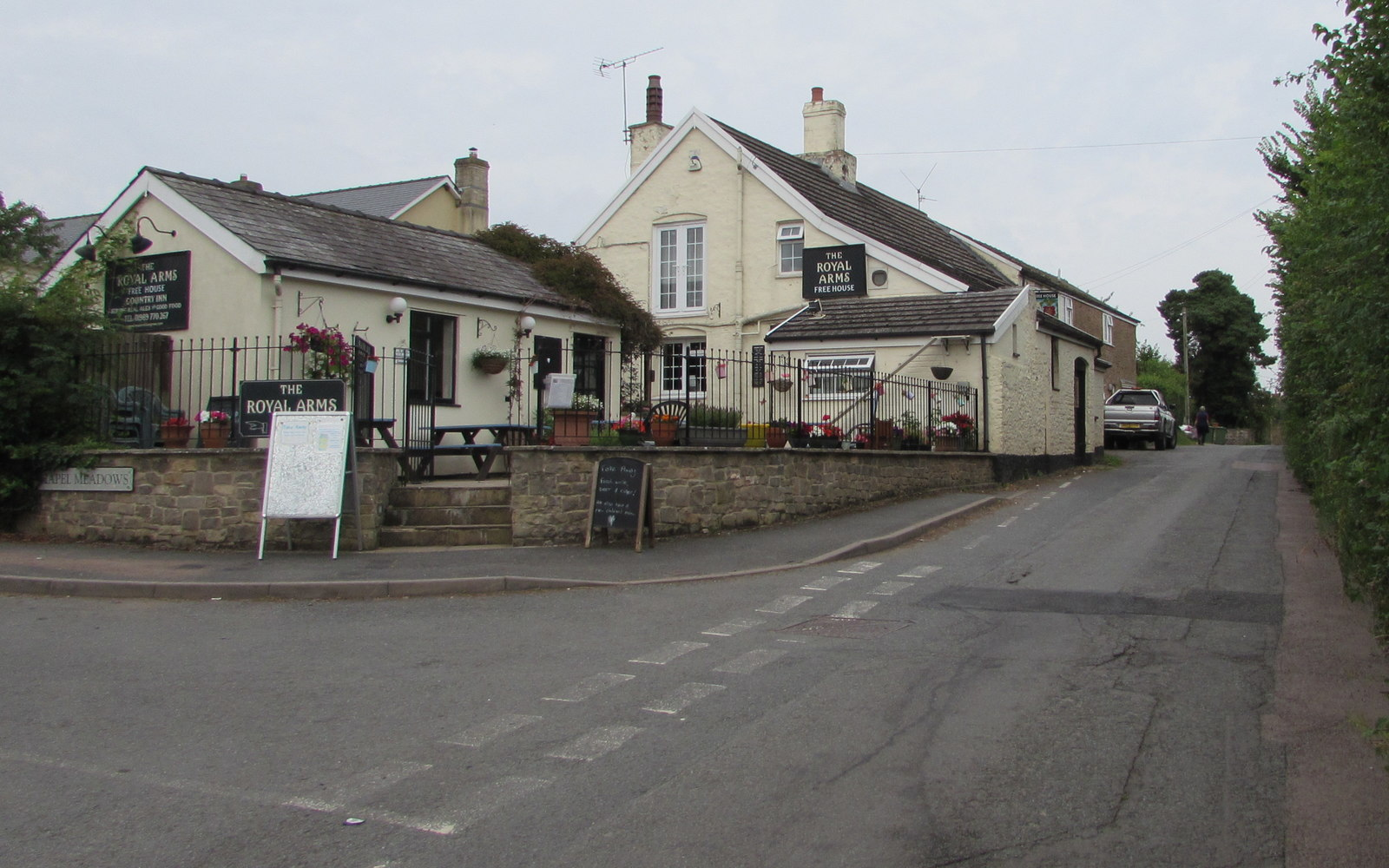
The Royal Arms

The only public house in the village is The Royal Arms. There was another 'beer house' called the Plough and Harrow during the 1850s run by a Richard Meredith, but the site is unknown. The Royal Arms, a wayside pub, is in a building that dates back to the 17th century. It was a blacksmith's shop and 'beer house' in the early 19th century owned by the Watkins family of blacksmiths and by 1851 became known as the Smith's Arms run by James Weal. From around 1858 until 1870 the landlady was Mrs. Elizabeth Burford, and although Charles Mapp had purchased the Smiths Arms in 1862 for £300, he did not take over the running of the pub until 1870. During his occupancy of nearly 30 years he changed the pub's name to The Royal Arms in 1881 to commemorate Queen Victoria's long reign. In 1890, The Royal Arms was sold to Alton Court Brewery, and since then, despite various changes, it has remained open. It is now an independent pub.

== Film & TV ==
Survivors (1975 TV series) was filmed extensively in and around Herefordshire and the old black smith's/garage in Llangrove appears in Episode 4 of Series 1. An episode of 'Escape to the Country' was filmed in The Royal Arms and featured a number of local residents.

== Sport and Leisure ==
Llangrove currently has a table tennis club. It did have cricket and football teams.

== Transport ==
There have never been any railways in or around the village. The nearest station would have been Symonds Yat, some miles away and across the river. There is no daily public bus service to the village; school buses provide transport for secondary schooling.

== Livelihoods ==
Llangrove is surrounded by open countryside with numerous farms. It is thought that the village supported these farms with workers and small industries such as blacksmith and cobbler.

The soil is sandy and loamy; subsoil, sandstone rock. In 1921 the chief crops were wheat, barley, oats and turnips.

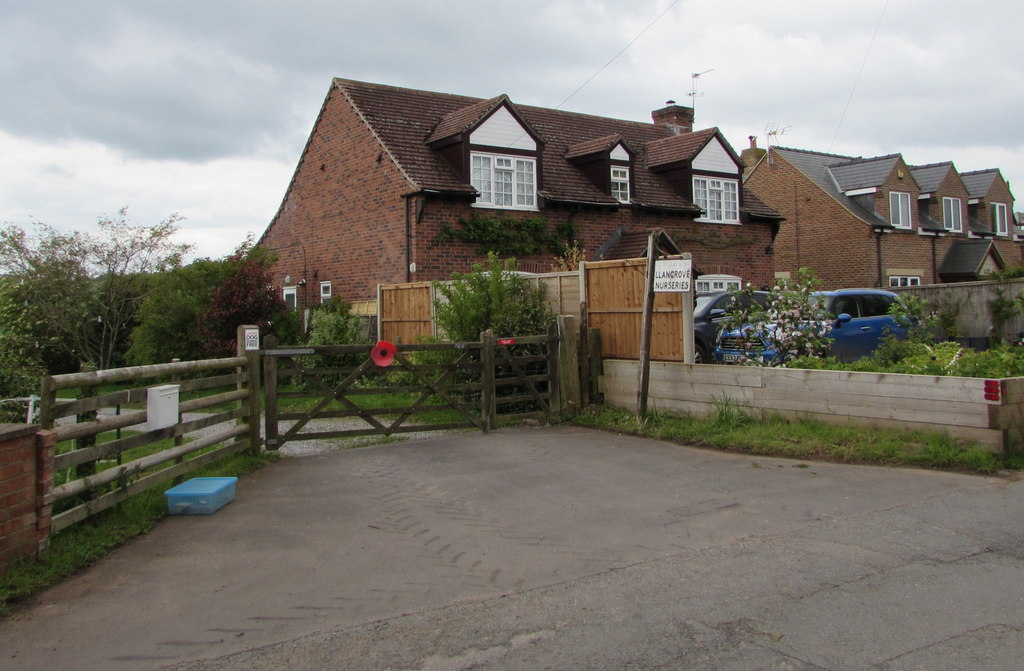
Entrance to Llangrove Nurseries

The village supported several nurseries in the past:

- Llangrove Nurseries, situated in the centre of the village to the south of the road through Llangrove. Owned by the Williams family, operated from the late 1930s through to 2000. Grew a variety of crops - tomatoes, freesias, bedding plans, geraniums, hanging bskets etc., ; and blackcurrants (supplied to Beechams for Ribena), raspberries (self pick), potatoes etc.
- Bryn Elm, which grew mostly flowers situated to the east of the village.
- Ken Trev Nurseries, situated beyond the north side of the village at the end of Church Lane. Believed to have ceased trading in 2019.

== Population ==
Year	Population of Llangrove
1861	742
1871	573
1911	367
1921	474
2022	442 (persons entitled to vote)

== Governance ==
Llangrove is within the electoral ward of Llangarron which stretches towards Ross-on-Wye with a total population taken at the 2011 Census of 3,357. The Local Government is Herefordshire Council.

== See also ==
- Archenfield
