= Diocese of Hereford =

Diocese of the Church of England

Coordinates: 52.0542°N 2.7160°W

Diocese of Hereford Dioecesis Herefordiensis
- Coat of arms

- Flag

Location
- Ecclesiastical province: Canterbury
- Archdeaconries: Hereford, Ludlow

Statistics
- Parishes: 338
- Churches: 402

Information
- Cathedral: Hereford Cathedral
- Language: English

Current leadership
- Bishop: Richard Jackson
- Archdeacons: Derek Chedzey, Archdeacon of Hereford; Samantha Hustwayte, Archdeacon of Ludlow

Website
- hereford.anglican.org

The Diocese of Hereford is a Church of England diocese based in Hereford, covering Herefordshire, southern Shropshire and a few parishes within Worcestershire in England, and a few parishes within Powys and Monmouthshire in Wales. The cathedral is Hereford Cathedral and the bishop is the Bishop of Hereford. The diocese is one of the oldest in England (created in 676 and based on the minor sub-kingdom of the Magonsæte) and is part of the Province of Canterbury.

== Bishops ==
The diocesan Bishop of Hereford (Richard Jackson) was, until 2020, assisted by the Bishop suffragan of Ludlow (which see was created in 1981) — it has been announced that the suffragan See is not to be filled. The provincial episcopal visitor (for parishes in this diocese – among twelve others in the western part of the Province of Canterbury – who reject the ministry of priests who are women, since 1994) is the Bishop suffragan of Oswestry, who is licensed as an honorary assistant bishop of the diocese in order to facilitate his work there.

Three retired bishops are licensed as assistant bishops in the diocese:

- Michael Westall (Bishop of South West Tanganyika) lives in Kingstone, Herefordshire.
- David Thomson (Bishop of Huntingdon), lives in Hereford.
- Michael Bourke (Bishop of Wolverhampton) also lives in the diocese at Little Stretton, Shropshire.

== Statistics ==
As reported in the Church of England's Statistics for Mission 2018, published in October 2019, the diocese had a population of 331,000, fewer than any other except Sodor and Man. With 402 churches, the population per church was 820, the lowest of any diocese and less than 60% of the 1420 in the next lowest, St Edmundsbury and Ipswich. Average weekly church attendance was 8,700, a new low, down from 9,300 in 2017. The total worshipping community was estimated at 13,300, up from 11,700 in 2014, and 44% of these were aged over 70 years.

== Archdeaconries and deaneries ==
The following deanery mergers have taken place:

- Kington and Weobley before 1972
- Ross and Archenfield before 1979

Diocese	Archdeaconry	Deanery	Paid clergy	Churches	Population	People/clergy	People/church	Churches/clergy
Diocese of Hereford	Archdeaconry of Hereford	Deanery of Abbeydore	5	35	12,046	2,409	344	7
Diocese of Hereford	Archdeaconry of Hereford	Deanery of Bromyard	5	23	10,465	2,093	455	4.6
Diocese of Hereford	Archdeaconry of Hereford	Deanery of Hereford	18*	44*	79,772	4,432	1,813	2.44
Diocese of Hereford	Archdeaconry of Hereford	Deanery of Kington and Weobley	5	30	14,142	2,828	471	6
Diocese of Hereford	Archdeaconry of Hereford	Deanery of Ledbury	5	22	17,884	3,577	813	4.4
Diocese of Hereford	Archdeaconry of Hereford	Deanery of Leominster	7	35	22,808	3,258	652	5
Diocese of Hereford	Archdeaconry of Hereford	Deanery of Ross and Archenfield	9	39	28,355	3,151	727	4.33
Diocese of Hereford	Archdeaconry of Ludlow	Deanery of Bridgnorth	10	34	28,851	2,885	849	3.4
Diocese of Hereford	Archdeaconry of Ludlow	Deanery of Clun Forest	5	27	10,383	2,077	385	5.4
Diocese of Hereford	Archdeaconry of Ludlow	Deanery of Condover	6	36	20,001	2,857	556	5.14
Diocese of Hereford	Archdeaconry of Ludlow	Deanery of Ludlow	6	42	28,238	4,706	672	7
Diocese of Hereford	Archdeaconry of Ludlow	Deanery of Pontesbury	5	24	15,091	3,018	629	4.8
Diocese of Hereford	Archdeaconry of Ludlow	Deanery of Telford Severn Gorge	5	9	25,952	5,190	2,884	1.8
Total/average			92	400	313,988	3,413	785	4.35

*including Cathedral

== Churches ==
=== Extra-parochial areas ===
- Brockhampton Dingle (population 0)
- Dinmore (population 20)
- Dinmore Preceptory (population 18)
- Hampton Wafer (population 0)
- Hill End and Old Church Moor (population 6)
- Horderley Hall (population 0)
- Liberty of St John the Baptist (population 19): Hereford Cathedral of SS Mary the Virgin & Ethelbert the King
- Livers Ocle (population 42)
- Ludlow Castle (population 1)
- New Court (population 0)
- New Hampton (population 46)
- Treville (population 51)
- Woodhouse (population 0)

=== Archdeaconry of Hereford ===
==== Deanery of Abbeydore ====
- Benefice of Black Mountains
  - Parish of Clodock and Longtown (population 627)
    - St Clydog's Church, Clodock (medieval parish church)
    - St Peter's Church, Longtown (medieval chapel to Clodock, closed and converted to house C20th)
  - Parish of Craswall (population 153): St Mary's Church (medieval chapel to Clydog)
  - Parish of Llanveynoe (population 103): SS Beuno & Peter's Church (medieval chapel to Clydog)
  - Parish of Michaelchurch Escley (population 169): St Michael's Church (medieval)
  - Parish of Newton (population 126): St John the Baptist's Church (1842)
  - Parish of St Margaret's (population 159): St Margaret's Church (medieval)
- Benefice of Borderlink
  - Parish of Blakemere (population 77): St Leonard's Church (medieval)
  - Parish of Bredwardine with Brobury (population 229)
    - St Andrew's Church, Bredwardine (medieval)
    - St Mary Magdalene's Church, Brobury (medieval, abandoned 1850s)
  - Parish of Clifford (population 366): St Mary the Virgin's Church (medieval)
  - Parish of Cusop (population 389): St Mary's Church (medieval)
  - Parish of Dorstone (population 400): St Faith's Church (medieval, rebuilt 1826, 1890)
  - Parish of Hardwicke (population 177): Holy Trinity Church (1851)
  - Parish of Moccas (population 107): St Michael & All Angels' Church (medieval)
  - Parish of Preston-on-Wye (population 194): St Lawrence's Church (medieval)
- Benefice of Cagebrook
  - Parish of Allensmore (population 556): St Andrew's Church (medieval)
  - Parish of Clehonger (population 1,571): All Saints' Church (medieval)
  - Parish of Eaton Bishop (population 435): St Michael & All Angels' Church (medieval)
  - Parish of Kingstone (population 1,499): St Michael & All Angels' Church (medieval)
  - Parish of Thruxton (population 47): St Bartholomew's Church (medieval)
- Benefice of Ewyas Harold
  - Parish of Abbeydore (population 283)
    - St Mary's Church (medieval abbey, reconsecrated as parish church 1634)
    - Cockyard Mission Hall (1920s, converted smithy)
  - Parish of Bacton (population 60): St Faith's Church (medieval)
  - Parish of Ewyas Harold and Dulas (population 904)
    - St Michael & All Angels' Church, Ewyas Harold (medieval)
    - St Michael's Church, Dulas (medieval, rebuilt 1866, redundant 2008)
  - Parish of Kentchurch with Llangua (population 339)
    - St Mary's Church, Kentchurch (medieval)
    - St James's Church, Llangua (medieval, originally St Kew's, redundant 1950s)
  - Parish of Kilpeck (population 258): SS Mary & David's Church (medieval, originally St David's Church)
  - Parish of Rowlestone and Llancillo (population 110)
    - St Peter's Church, Rowlestone (medieval)
    - St Peter's or St Tysilio's Church, Llancillo (medieval, redundant 2006)
  - Parish of St Devereux (population 93): St Dubricius' Church (medieval)
  - Parish of Walterstone (population 97): St Mary's Church (medieval)
  - Parish of Wormbridge (population 131): St Peter's Church (medieval)
- Benefice of Wyedore
  - Parish of Madley with Tyberton (population 1,327)
    - Church of the Nativity of the Blessed Virgin Mary, Madley (medieval)
    - St Mary's Church, Tyberton (medieval, rebuilt 1721)
  - Parish of Peterchurch (population 1,037): St Peter's Church (medieval)
  - Parish of Vowchurch and Turnastone (population 206)
    - St Bartholomew's Church, Vowchurch (medieval)
    - St Mary Magdalene's Church, Turnastone (medieval)

==== Deanery of Bromyard ====
- Benefice of Bredenbury
  - Parish of Bredenbury with Grendon Bishop and Wacton
    - St Andrew's New Church, Bredenbury (1877)
    - St Andrew's Old Church, Bredenbury (medieval, abandoned 1877)
    - St John the Baptist's Church, Grendon Bishop (medieval)
    - St Andrew's Church, Wacton (medieval, abandoned 1881)
  - Parish of Collington: St Mary's Church (medieval, rebuilt 1856)
  - Parish of Edwyn Ralph: St Michael & All Angels' Church (medieval)
  - Parish of Little Cowarne
  - Parish of Pencombe with Marston Stannett
  - Parish of Thornbury
  - Parish of Ullingswick

Benefice	Churches	Link	Clergy	Population served	Ref
(St Andrew)	St Michael, Edwyn Ralph; St Guthlac, Little Cowarne; St John, Pencombe; St Anna, Thornbury; St Luke, Ullingswick		Rector: Elizabeth Sidwell	1,526	
Bromyard (St Peter) and Stoke Lacy	St Peter, Bromyard; Brockhampton Chapel; St Peter & St Paul, Stoke Lacy		Vicar: Phillip Miller; Curate: David Hall; Licensed Lay Minister Michael Wild	5,268	
Edvin Loach (St Mary) with Tedstone Delamere, Tedstone Wafer, Upper Sapey, Wolferlow and Whitbourne	St Mary, Edvin Loach; St James, Tedstone Delamere; St Michael, Upper Sapey; St John the Baptist, Whitbourne		Priest-in-Charge: Vacant; NSM: Dawn Hyett	1,412	
Frome Valley Group of Parishes, The, Comprising Acton Beauchamp, Bishops Frome, Castle Frome and Fromes Hill, Evesbatch, Much Cowarne, Ocle Pychard, and Stanford Bishop	St Giles, Acton Beauchamp; St Mary the Virgin, Bishop's Frome; St Michael, Castle Frome; St Matthew, Fromes Hill; St Andrew, Evesbatch; St Mary the Virgin, Much Cowarne; St James the Great, Ocle Pychard; St James, Stanford Bishop		Vicar: Steven Baggs; NSM: Richard Allaway	2,259	

=== Deanery of Hereford ===
Benefice	Churches	Link	Clergy	Population served	Ref
Bartestree Cross Group	St Peter, Dormington; St Peter, Lugwardine; St John the Baptist, Weston Beggard; St Bartholomew, Westhide; St Peter, Withington		Rector: Tiffany Jackson	4,051	
Pipe-Cum-Lyde (St Peter) and Moreton-On-Lugg	St Peter, Pipe-Cum-Lyde; St Andrew, Moreton-on-Lugg				
Stretton Sugwas (St Mary Magdalene)	St Mary Magdalene, Stretton Sugwas				
Credenhill (St Mary) Brinsop and Wormsley, Mansel Lacy and Yazor, Kenchester, Bridge Sollers and Bishopstone	St Mary, Credenhill; St Lawrence, Bishopstone; St Andrew, Bridge Sollars; St George, Brinsop; St Michael, Kenchester; St Michael, Mansel Lacy		Priest-in-Charge: Rana James; NSM: Angie Deane	2,978	
Fownhope Group	St Mary, Fownhope; All Saints, Brockhampton; Holy Rood, Mordiford; St George, Woolhope; St Nicholas, Checkley		Rector: Owen Pembrey	2,296	
Hereford (St Peter with St Owen) (St James)	St Peter with St Owen, Hereford; St James, Hereford; St Giles' Chapel, Hereford		Vicar: Andy Morgan; Associate Vicar: Curate: Elliot Swattridge; Curate: Luke Aylen; OLM: Sharon Elson	5,796	
Hereford South Wye (St Francis) (St Martin)	St Martin, Hereford; St Peter, Upper Bullinghope		Team Rector: Anne Dowdeswell; Curate: Lauren Bell	22,894	
Wye, South Rural Parishes, Including Ballingham, Dinedor, Holme Lacy, and Little Dewchurch	St David, Little Dewchurch		Vicar: Vacant	1,449	
Wye, South Rural Parishes, Including Ballingham, Dinedor, Holme Lacy, and Little Dewchurch	St Andrew, Dinedor		Vicar: Vacant	1,449	
Hereford, West Team Ministry (All Saints) (Holy Trinity) (St Michael) (St Nicholas)	All Saints, Hereford; Holy Trinity, Hereford; St Nicholas, Hereford; St Michael, Breinton		Team Rector: Ruth Hulse; Team Vicar: Vacant; Curate: Joanna Burden; Curate: Louis Benyon	13,710	
Tupsley (St Paul) with Hampton Bishop	St Paul, Tupsley; St Andrew, Hampton Bishop		Vicar: Curate:	11,308	
Holmer (St Bartholomew) (St Mary) with Huntington	St Mary Magdalene, Huntington; St Bartholomew, Holmer; St Mary, Holmer		Vicar: Steven Lee; Assistant Vicar: Rob Oram; Curate: Erin Butler	8,321	

=== Deanery of Kington and Weobley ===
Benefice	Churches	Link	Clergy	Population served	Ref
Eardisley (St Mary Magdalene) with Bollingham, Willersley, Brilley, Michaelchurch, Whitney, Winforton, Almeley and Kinnersley	St Mary, Almeley		Rector: Marcus Small	2,221	
Eardisley (St Mary Magdalene) with Bollingham, Willersley, Brilley, Michaelchurch, Whitney, Winforton, Almeley and Kinnersley	St Mary Magdalene, Eardisley; St Mary, Brilley; St Silas, Bollingham; St James, Kinnersley; SS Peter & Paul, Whitney; St Michael & All Angels, Winforton		Rector: Marcus Small	2,221	
Kington (St Mary) with Huntington, Old Radnor, Kinnerton and Titley	St Mary, Kington; St Thomas a Becket, Huntington; St Mary the Virgin, Kinnerton; St Stephen, Old Radnor; St Peter, Titley		Rector: Ben Griffith; Curate: Linda McDermott; NSM: Paul Buckingham	4,004	
Letton (St John the Baptist) with Staunton, Byford, Mansel Gamage and Monnington	St John the Baptist, Letton; St John the Baptist, Byford; St Mary, Monnington-on-Wye; St Mary, Staunton-on-Wye		Vicar (Weobley): Philip Harvey	2,245	
Weobley (St Peter and St Paul) with Sarnesfield and Norton Canon	SS Peter & Paul, Weobley; St Nicholas, Norton Canon; St Mary, Sarnesfield		Vicar (Weobley): Philip Harvey	2,245	
Arrowvale Group	St Mary the Virgin, Pembridge; St Mary, Byton; St Michael & All Angels, Lyonshall; St Mary's Chapel, Moorcourt; St John the Evangelist, Shobdon; St Peter, Staunton-on-Arrow		Rector: Anna Branston	2,868	
Presteigne (St Andrew) with Discoed, Kinsham, Lingen and Knill	St Andrew, Presteigne; All Saints, Kinsham; St Michael & All Angels, Knill; St Michael & All Angels, Lingen; St Michael, Discoed		Rector: Stephen Hollingshurst; NSM: Debbie Venables	2,804	

==== Closed churches in the area ====
Church	Location	Founded (building)	Closed
St Michael, Michaelchurch-on-Arrow	Brilley	Medieval Not a closed church; continues fully operational 26/07/2020 and operates in conjunction with Brilley. RDJ - Diocese of Hereford 26.07.20	
Ednol Church	Kinnerton	Medieval?	C19th Not associated with Kinnersley parish. Part of the Parish of Old Radnor. RDJ - Diocese of Hereford 26.07.20

=== Deanery of Ledbury ===
Benefice	Churches	Link	Clergy	Population served	Ref
Colwall (St Crispin's Chapel) (St James the Great) with Upper Colwall (Good Shepherd) and Coddington	St James the Great, Colwall; All Saints, Coddington		Rector: Melanie Horton; NSM: Anne Lanyon-Hogg	2,455	
Cradley (St James) with Mathon and Storridge	St James, Cradley		Rector: Robert Ward	2,031	
Cradley (St James) with Mathon and Storridge	St John the Baptist, Mathon		Rector: Robert Ward	2,031	
Cradley (St James) with Mathon and Storridge	St John the Baptist, Storridge		Rector: Robert Ward	2,031	
Cider Churches Benefice, The, Comprising Aylton, Little Marcle, Much Marcle with Yatton, Pixley, Putley, and Wellington Heath	Aylton Parish Church; St Michael & All Angels, Little Marcle; St Bartholomew, Much Marcle; All Saints, Yatton; St Andrew, Pixley; Putley Parish Church; Christ Church, Wellington Heath		Vicar: Valerie Tait; NSM: John Rhodes	1,789	
Hop Churches Benefice, The, Comprising Bosbury, Canon Frome, Munsley, Stoke Edith, Stretton Grandison with Ashperton, Tarrington, and Yarkhill	Holy Trinity, Bosbury		Vicar: Mandy Williams; NSM: Nicola Seabright; NSM: John Watkins	2,083	
Hop Churches Benefice, The, Comprising Bosbury, Canon Frome, Munsley, Stoke Edith, Stretton Grandison with Ashperton, Tarrington, and Yarkhill	St John the Baptist, Yarkhill		Vicar: Mandy Williams; NSM: Nicola Seabright; NSM: John Watkins	2,083	
Hop Churches Benefice, The, Comprising Bosbury, Canon Frome, Munsley, Stoke Edith, Stretton Grandison with Ashperton, Tarrington, and Yarkhill	St James, Canon Frome; St Bartholomew, Munsley; St Mary, Stoke Edith; St Bartholomew, Ashperton; St Lawrence, Stratton Grandison; SS Philip & James, Tarrington		Vicar: Mandy Williams; NSM: Nicola Seabright; NSM: John Watkins	2,083	
Ledbury (St Michael and All Angels) with Eastnor	St Michael & All Angels, Ledbury		Vicar: Keith Hilton-Turvey; NSM: William Simmonds	9,526	
Ledbury (St Michael and All Angels) with Eastnor	St John the Baptist, Eastnor		Vicar: Keith Hilton-Turvey; NSM: William Simmonds	9,526	

=== Deanery of Leominster ===
Benefice	Churches	Link	Clergy	Population served	Ref	
Wellington and the Pyons Group	St Peter, Birley; St Lawrence, Canon Pyon; St Francis, Westhope; St Mary the Virgin, King's Pyon; Ledgemoor Mission Room; St Margaret of Antioch, Wellington		Vicar: Anne Price	2,023		
Mortimer's Cross Group	St Michael & All Angels, Kingsland; SS John the Baptist & Alkmund, Aymestrey; St Andrew, Leinthall Earles; St Mary the Virgin, Eardisland		Rector: Julie Read; Curate: Rosie Roberts	1,946		
Leominster Team Ministry			Team Rector: Guy Cole; Team Vicar: Vacant; Team Vicar: Matthew Burns; Curate East: Fiona Honeysett; Curate West: William Talbot-Ponsoby; Lay Pioneer: Kathy Bland; Lay Pioneer: David Bland	16,427		
Leominster Team Ministry	St Peter & St Paul, Leominster; Eastern Parishes: St Luke, Stoke Prior; St James the Great, Kimbolton; St Dubricius & All Saints, Hamnish; St Leonard, Hatfield; St John of Jerusalem, Ford; St Mary the Virgin, Hope-under-Dinmore; St Peter, Pudleston; St Michael, Bockleton; St Mary the Virgin, Middleton-on-the-Hill; St Andrew, Leysters; St Mary the Virgin, Humber; St Bartholomew, Docklow; Western Parishes: St Mary the Virgin, Dilwyn & Stretford; St George, Orleton; St Michael, Brimfield; All Saints, Eyton; St Peter & St Paul, Eye; St Leonard, Yarpole; St Michael & All Angels, Croft; , Luston; St John, Ivington; All Saints, Monkland		Team Rector: Guy Cole; Team Vicar: Vacant; Team Vicar: Matthew Burns; Curate East: Fiona Honeysett; Curate West: William Talbot-Ponsoby; Lay Pioneer: Kathy Bland; Lay Pioneer: David Bland	16,427		
Burghill (St Mary the Virgin)	St Mary the Virgin, Burghill		Rector (Burghill Benefice): Dr. Philip Brown; Reader:Susannah Peppiatt	3,234		
Wigmore Abbey, Comprising Adforton, Aston, Brampton Bryan, Burrington, Downton, Elton, Leinthall Starkes, Leintwardine, and Wigmore	St Andrew, Adforton; St Giles, Aston; St Barnabas, Brampton Bryan; St George, Burrington; St Giles, Downton; St Mary the Virgin, Elton; St Mary Magdalene, Leinthall Starkes; St Mary Magdalene, Leintwardine; St James the Apostle, Wigmore		Rector (Burghill Benefice): Dr. Philip Brown; Reader:Susannah Peppiatt	3,234	Rector: Dr. Adrian Thompson; Distinctive Deacon: Lucy Thompson; Distinctive Deacon: Elizabeth Womack	2,412
Maund Group, Comprising Bodenham, Felton and Preston Wynne, Marden with Amberley and Wisteston, and Sutton St Nicholas and Sutton St Michael	St Michael & All Angels, Bodenham; St Michael the Archangel, Felton; Holy Trinity, Preston Wynne; Amberley Chapel; St Mary the Virgin, Marden; St Michael, Sutton St Michael; St Nicholas, Sutton St Nicholas		Rector (Burghill Benefice): Dr. Philip Brown; Reader:Susannah Peppiatt	3,234	Rector: Paul Roberts	3,735

=== Deanery of Ross and Archenfield ===
Benefice	Churches	Link	Clergy	Population served	Ref
Ariconium: Aston Ingham, Hope Mansel, Linton, the Lea, Upton Bishop and Weston-Under-Penyard	St John the Baptist, Aston Ingham; St Michael, Hope Mansel; St Mary the Virgin, Linton; St John the Baptist, The Lea; St John the Baptist, Upton Bishop; St Lawrence, Weston-under-Penyard		Rector: David Howell	3,431	
Wye Brooks Benefice, The, Comprising Goodrich, Llangarron, Llangrove, Marstow, Welsh Bicknor, and Welsh Newton with Llanrothal	St Giles, Goodrich		Vicar: Philip Bentham; NSM: Richard Jones; OLM: Penny Powdrill	2,453	
Wye Brooks Benefice, The, Comprising Goodrich, Llangarron, Llangrove, Marstow, Welsh Bicknor, and Welsh Newton with Llanrothal	St Deinst, Llangarron; Christ Church, Llangrove; St Matthew, Marstow; St Mary the Virgin, Welsh Newton		Vicar: Philip Bentham; NSM: Richard Jones; OLM: Penny Powdrill	2,453	
Ross (St Mary the Virgin) with Walford and Brampton Abbotts	St Mary the Virgin, Ross-on-Wye; St Michael & All Angels, Walford; Brampton Abbotts Church		Rector: Sean Semple; Curate: Tiffany Jackson; NSM: Caroline Pascoe; Hon. Curate: Christopher Blanchard	12,066	
St Weonards (St Weonard)	St Weonard, St Weonards; St Michael, Garway; St Dubricius, Hentland; St Catherine, Hoarwithy; St John the Baptist, Orcop; St Denys, Pencoyd; St Mary, Tretire		Rector: Vacant; NSM: Fran Pullen	2,001	
Stowcaple	St Bridget, Bridstow; St Mary, Foy; SS Andrew & Mary, How Caple; St John the Baptist, King's Caple; St Peter, Peterstow; St Michael, Sollers Hope		Vicar: Crispin Pemberton	2,330	
Stowcaple	St Tysilio, Sellack		Vicar: Crispin Pemberton	2,330	
Wormelow Hundred, Comprising Dewsall with Callow, Little Birch, Llandinabo, Llanwarne, Much Birch, and Much Dewchurch	St Michael, Dewsall; St Mary, Little Birch; St Junabius, Llandinabo; Christ Church, Llanwarne; SS Mary & Thomas a Becket, Much Birch; St David, Much Dewchurch		Rector: Mark Johnson	2,378	
Wye Reaches Group, The, Comprising Bishopswood, Dixton Newton, Ganarew, and Whitchurch	All Saints, Bishopswood; St Peter, Dixton Newton; St James, Wyesham; St Swithin, Ganarew; St Dubricius, Whitchurch		Vicar: Tim Starling; OLM: Penny Powdrill (see above)	3,696	

=== Deanery of Bridgnorth ===
Benefice	Churches	Link	Clergy	Population served	Ref
Alveley (St Mary the Virgin) and Quatt	St Mary the Virgin, Alveley; St Andrew, Quatt		Rector: Vacant; NSM: Ruth Sims	2,242	
Bridgnorth (St Mary Magdalene) (St Leonard) (St James) and Morville Parishes Team Ministry, Including Acton Round, Astley Abbotts, Aston Eyre, Monkhopton with Upton Cressett, Morville, Oldbury, Quatford, and Tasley	St Mary Magdalene, Bridgnorth; St Leonard, Bridgnorth; St James, Bridgnorth; St Calixtus, Astley Abbotts; St Nicholas, Oldbury; St Mary Magdalene, Quatford; SS Peter & Paul, Tasley; St Mary, Acton Round; Aston Eyre Parish Church; St Peter, Monkhopton; St Gregory, Morville		Team Rector: Vacant; Team Vicar: Vacant; NSM: Marjorie Brooks	14,827	
Claverley (All Saints) with Tuckhill	All Saints, Claverley; Holy Innocents, Tuckhill		Vicar: Garry Ward	1,838	
Ditton Priors (St John the Baptist) with Neenton, Burwarton, Cleobury North, Aston Botterell, Wheathill and Loughton and Chetton	St John the Baptist, Ditton Priors; St Michael & All Angels, Aston Botterell; St Giles, Chetton; SS Peter & Paul, Cleobury North; All Saints, Neenton; Loughton Parish Church; Holy Trinity, Wheathill		Rector: Vacant	1,820	
Highley (St Mary) with Billingsley, Glazeley and Deuxhill and Chelmarsh	St Mary, Highley		Vicar: Kina Robertshaw; NSM: Val Smith; NSM: Angie Forster; NSM: David Poyner	4,424	
Highley (St Mary) with Billingsley, Glazeley and Deuxhill and Chelmarsh	St Mary, Billingsley		Vicar: Kina Robertshaw; NSM: Val Smith; NSM: Angie Forster; NSM: David Poyner	4,424	
Highley (St Mary) with Billingsley, Glazeley and Deuxhill and Chelmarsh	St Peter, Chelmarsh		Vicar: Kina Robertshaw; NSM: Val Smith; NSM: Angie Forster; NSM: David Poyner	4,424	
Highley (St Mary) with Billingsley, Glazeley and Deuxhill and Chelmarsh	St Bartholomew, Glazeley		Vicar: Kina Robertshaw; NSM: Val Smith; NSM: Angie Forster; NSM: David Poyner	4,424	
Stottesdon (St Mary) with Farlow, Cleeton St Mary, Silvington, Sidbury and Middleton Scriven	St Mary, Stottesdon; St Mary, Cleeton; St Giles, Farlow; St John the Baptist, Middleton Scriven; Holy Trinity, Sidbury; St Michael, Silvington		Rector: Mark Daborn	1,564	
Worfield (St Peter)	St Peter, Worfield; Ackleton Mission Room		Vicar: Jeannetta Stokes	2,136	

=== Deanery of Clun Forest ===
Benefice	Churches	Link	Clergy	Population served	Ref
Bishop's Castle (St John the Baptist) with Mainstone, Lydbury North and Edgton	St John the Baptist, Bishop's Castle; St Michael the Archangel, Edgton; St Michael & All Angels, Lydbury North; St John the Baptist, Mainstone		Priest-in-Charge: Stephanie Fountain; Curate (Churchstoke): Carol Whittock	4,827	
Churchstoke (St Nicholas) with Hyssington and Sarn	Holy Trinity Church, Sarn		Priest-in-Charge: Stephanie Fountain; Curate (Churchstoke): Carol Whittock	4,827	
Churchstoke (St Nicholas) with Hyssington and Sarn	St Nicholas, Churchstoke; St Etheldreda, Hyssington		Priest-in-Charge: Stephanie Fountain; Curate (Churchstoke): Carol Whittock	4,827	
Clun Valley Benefice, The, Comprising Bettwys-Y-Crwyn, Clun, Clunbury with Clunton, Hopesay, and Newcastle	St Mary, Bettws-y-Crwyn; St George, Clun; St Swithin, Clunbury; St Mary, Clunton; St Mary the Virgin, Hopesay; St John the Evangelist, Newcastle		Vicar: Vacant	2,676	
Middle Marches Benefice, The, Comprising Bedstone, Bucknell, Chapel Lawn, Clungunford, Hopton Castle, Llanfair Waterdine, and Stowe	St Mary, Bedstone; St Mary, Bucknell; St Mary, Chapel Lawn; St Cuthbert, Clungunford; St Edward, Hopton Castle; St Mary, Llanfair Waterdine; St Michael & All Angels, Stowe		Vicar: Martin Quayle	1,870	
Wentnor (St Michael and All Angels) with Ratlinghope, Myndtown, Norbury, More, Lydham and Snead	St John the Baptist, Myndtown		Rector: Vivienne Hatton	1,010	
Wentnor (St Michael and All Angels) with Ratlinghope, Myndtown, Norbury, More, Lydham and Snead	St Michael & All Angels, Wentnor; Holy Trinity, Lydham; St Peter, More; All Saints, Norbury; St Margaret, Ratlinghope; St Mary the Virgin, Snead		Rector: Vivienne Hatton	1,010	

=== Deanery of Condover ===
Benefice	Churches	Link	Clergy	Population served	Ref
Apedale Group, The, Comprising Cardington, Eaton Under Heywood, Hope Bowdler, and Rushbury	St James, Cardington; St Edith, Eaton-under-Heywood; St Andrew, Hope Bowdler; St Peter, Rushbury		Rector: Lisa Harper; NSM:	1,617	
Church Stretton (St Laurence)	St Laurence, Church Stretton; St Michael & All Angels, All Stretton; All Saints, Little Stretton		Rector: Stephen Johnson; Curate: Mary Carter; Hon. Curate: Christobel Hargreaves	4,833	
Condover (St Andrew and St Mary) with Frodesley, Acton Burnell and Pitchford	SS Andrew & Mary, Condover; Ryton Mission Chapel; St Mary, Acton Burnell; St Mark, Frodesley; St Michael & All Angels, Pitchford		Rector: Geoff Garrett	2,222	
Craven Arms	St Margaret, Acton Scott; St Thomas, Halford; St John the Baptist, Stokesay; Holy Trinity, Wistanstow		Vicar: Clive Munday; NSM (Ac, Hal, Sto): Mervyn Williams		
Dorrington (St Edward) with Leebotwood, Longnor, Stapleton, Smethcote and Woolstaston	St Edward, Dorrington; St Mary, Leebotwood; St Mary, Longnor; St Michael, Smethcott; St John, Stapleton; St Michael & All Angels, Woolstaston		Rector: Laura Hnatiuk	1,616	
Wenlock, Comprising Berrington with Betton Strange, Church Preen, Cound, Cressage, Easthope, Harley, Hughley, Kenley, Much Wenlock with Bourton, Sheinton, Shipton, and Stanton Long	All Saints, Berrington; St Margaret, Betton Strange; St John the Baptist, Church Preen; St Peter, Cound; Christ Church, Cressage; St Peter, Easthope; St Mary, Harley; St John the Baptist, Hughley; St John the Baptist, Kenley; Holy Trinity, Bourton; Holy Trinity, Much Wenlock; SS Peter & Paul, Sheinton; St James, Shipton; St Michael & All Angels, Stanton Long		Team Rector: Matthew Stafford; Curate: Alison Walker; NSM: John Cumberland	6,151	

=== Deanery of Ludlow ===
Benefice	Churches	Link	Clergy	Population served	Ref
Ashfords, The, Including Ashford Bowdler, Ashford Carbonel, Caynham, Knowbury, Ludford, and Richards Castle	St Andrew, Ashford Bowdler; St Mary, Ashford Carbonell; St Mary, Caynham; St Paul, Knowbury; St Giles, Ludford; All Saints, Richards Castle		Rector: Lynn Money	2,086	
Bromfield (St Mary the Virgin), Including Bitterley with Middleton, Bromfield, Clee St Margaret and Cold Weston, Onibury, Stanton Lacy, and Stoke St Milborough with the Heath and Hopton Cangeford	St Peter, Stanton Lacy		Rector: Justin Parker	2,201	
Bromfield (St Mary the Virgin), Including Bitterley with Middleton, Bromfield, Clee St Margaret and Cold Weston, Onibury, Stanton Lacy, and Stoke St Milborough with the Heath and Hopton Cangeford	St Mary the Virgin, Bromfield; St Mary, Bitterley; Holy Trinity, Middleton; St Margaret, Clee St Margaret; St Michael & All Angels, Onibury; Heath Chapel; St Milburgha, Stoke St Milborough		Rector: Justin Parker	2,201	
Cleobury Mortimer (St Mary the Virgin) with Hopton Wafers, Neen Sollars and Milson, Neen Savage with Kinlet and Doddington	St Mary the Virgin, Cleobury Mortimer; St John the Baptist, Doddington; St Michael & All Angels, Hopton Wafers; St John the Baptist, Kinlet; St Mary, Neen Savage; St George, Milson; All Saints, Neen Sollars		Rector: Ashley Buck; Curate: Joseph Simons	4,850	
Corvedale Benefice, The, Comprising Culmington, Diddlebury, Holdgate, Munslow, and Tugford	All Saints, Culmington; St Peter, Diddlebury; Holy Trinity, Holdgate; Broadstone Chapel; St Michael, Munslow; St Catherine, Tugford; St Margaret, Abdon		Rector: John Beesley	1,606	
Ludlow (St John) (St Laurence)	St John the Evangelist, Ludlow		Rector: Kelvin Price; Curate: Lawrence Gittins; Curate: Wayne Davies	10,511	
Ludlow (St John) (St Laurence)	St Laurence, Ludlow		Rector: Kelvin Price; Curate: Lawrence Gittins; Curate: Wayne Davies	10,511	
Tenbury Team Ministry, the (St Mary) (St Michael and All Angels), Including Burford, Clee Hill, Coreley, Greete, Hope Bagot, Little Hereford, and Whitton	St Mary, Burford; St Peter, Clee Hill; St Peter, Coreley; The Knowle Church; St James, Greete; St John the Baptist, Hope Bagot; St Mary Magdalene, Little Hereford; St John the Baptist, Nash; Boraston Church; St Michael & All Angels, Tenbury; St Mary, Tenbury Wells; St Mary, Whitton		Team Rector: Sian Harris; Team Vicar: Mark Inglis; Curate: Lizzie Womack; NSM: Susan Foster	6,984	

=== Deanery of Pontesbury ===
Benefice	Churches	Link	Clergy	Population served	Ref
Chirbury (St Michael), Marton, Middleton and Trelystan with Leighton	St Michael, Chirbury; St Mark, Marton-in-Chirbury; Holy Trinity, Middleton-in-Chirbury; St Mary the Virgin, Trelystan; Holy Trinity, Leighton		Vicar: William Rowell	1,307	
Ford (St Michael), Gt Wollaston and Alberbury with Cardeston	St Michael, Ford; St Michael & All Angels, Alberbury; St Michael, Cardeston; St Margaret, Wattlesborough; All Saints, Middletown; St John the Baptist, Great Wollaston		Vicar: Greg Roberts; OLM: Maxine Neal	3,079	
Hanwood, Great (St Thomas) and Longden and Annscroft with Pulverbatch	St Thomas, Great Hanwood		Rector: Graham Phillips; OLM: Sheila Dawson-Campbell	2,633	
Hanwood, Great (St Thomas) and Longden and Annscroft with Pulverbatch	St Edith, Pulverbatch; Christ Church, Annscroft; St Ruthen, Longden		Rector: Graham Phillips; OLM: Sheila Dawson-Campbell	2,633	
Minsterley (Holy Trinity), Habberley and Hope with Shelve	Holy Trinity, Minsterley; St Luke, Snailbeach; St Mary, Habberley; Holy Trinity, Hope; All Saints, Shelve		Rector: Greg Smith	2,846	
Pontesbury First and Second Portions (St George)	St George, Pontesbury		Priest-in-Charge: Greg Smith	2,816	
Westbury (St Mary), Worthen and Yockleton	Holy Trinity, Yockleton		Rector: David Moss	2,410	
Westbury (St Mary), Worthen and Yockleton	St Mary, Westbury; All Saints, Worthen		Rector: David Moss	2,410	

=== Deanery of Telford Severn Gorge ===
Benefice	Churches	Link	Clergy	Population served	Ref
Broseley (All Saints) with Benthall, Jackfield, Linley, Willey and Barrow	All Saints, Broseley; St Mary the Virgin, Jackfield; St Giles, Barrow		Priest-in-Charge: Christopher Penn	5,715	
Coalbrookdale (Holy Trinity), Iron-Bridge and Little Wenlock	Holy Trinity, Coalbrookdale; St Luke, Ironbridge; St Lawrence, Little Wenlock		Priest-in-Charge: Ernest Okeke; NSM: Janet Edwards; NSM: Pamela Morgan	3,725	
Madeley (St Michael)	St Michael, Madeley; Sutton Hill Church; Woodside Church		Priest-in-Charge: Alan Walden; Priest-in-Charge: Dawn Taffinder; Curate: Iain MacIntyre	16,512	

== Dedications ==
=== Medieval churches ===
- All Saints: Clehonger
- St Andrew: Allensmore, Bredwardine
- St Bartholomew: Thruxton, Vowchurch
- St Beuno: Llanveynoe
- St Clydog: Clodock
- St David: Kilpeck
- St Dubricius: St Devereux
- St Faith: Bacton, Dorstone
- St James: Llangua (red.)
- St Kew: Llangua
- St Lawrence: Preston-on-Wye
- St Leonard: Blakemere
- St Margaret: St Margaret's
- St Mary: Clifford, Craswall, Cusop, Kentchurch, Tyberton, Walterstone
- SS Mary & Ethelbert: Hereford Cathedral
- St Mary Magdalene: Brobury, Turnastone
- St Michael: Dulas, Eaton Bishop, Ewyas Harold, Kingstone, Michaelchurch Escley, Moccas
- Nativity of Mary: Madley
- St Peter: Longtown, Peterchurch, Rowlestone, Wormbridge
- St Tysilio: Llancillo

=== Post-medieval churches ===
- St John the Baptist: Newton (1842)
- St Mary: Abbeydore (1634)
- Holy Trinity: Hardwicke (1851)
- No dedication: Cockyard (1920s)

== Benefices by population ==
Benefice	Population	Churches	Clergy (Nov 2025)
Cagebrook	4,108	5	1 Priest-in-Charge, 1 NSM
Wyedore	2,570	5	1 Rector
Ewyas Harold	2,275	10	Vacant
Borderlink	1,939	8	Vacant
Black Mountains	1,337	6	1 Priest-in-Charge (also Curate in Ewyas Harold), 1 NSM

== Deaneries by population ==
Deanery	Population	Churches	Clergy (Nov 2025)	Pop. per stip. cl.
Abbeydore	12,229	34	1 Rector, 2 Priests-in-Charge, 2 NSMs	4,076

== Sources ==
- Haydn's Book of Dignities (1894) Joseph Haydn/Horace Ockerby, reprinted 1969
- Whitaker's Almanack 1883 to 2004, Joseph Whitaker and Sons Ltd/A&C Black, London
- Church of England Statistics 2002
