= Madley Communications Centre =

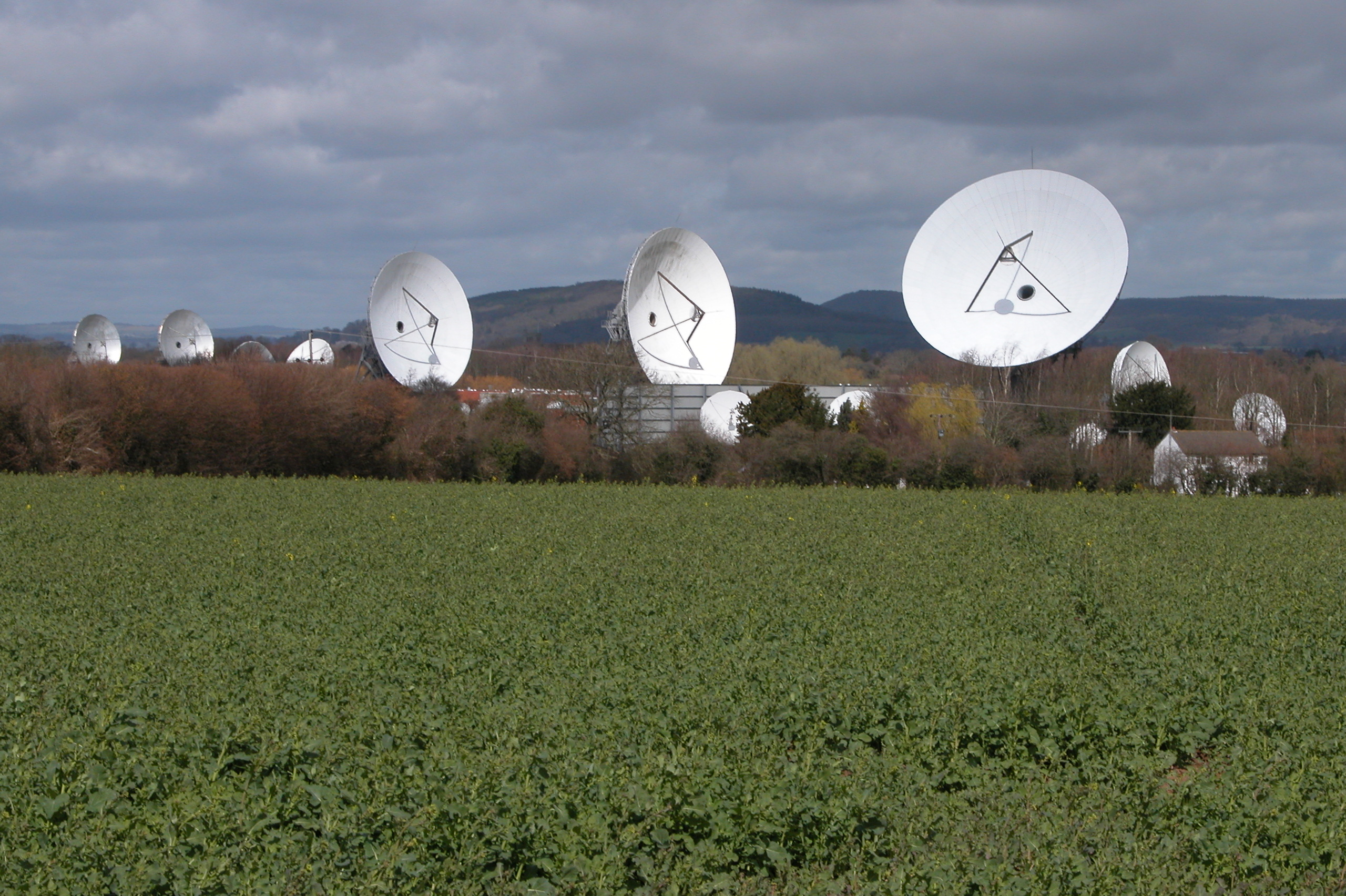
- Earth receiving dishes

- Location within Herefordshire

General information
- Type: Earth station
- Location: Kingstone, Herefordshire
- Coordinates: 52.03198°N 2.84049°W
- Construction started: 1975
- Inaugurated: September 1978
- Owner: BT Group
- Landlord: BT Group

Technical details
- Floor area: 218 acres (0.88 km^{2})

Madley Communications Centre is BT Group's earth satellite tracking station, between Madley and Kingstone, Herefordshire, England.

== Earth position ==
It lies on Coldstone Common at grid reference SO424374. The site dates from 1975 and is in active use for international telephone, fax and television transmission and reception. The station is in the civil parish of Kingstone, although most of the former airfield is in Madley, to the west of the site. The Roman road running south from Kenchester passes close to the north of the site.

=== Geology of the area ===
The site is in a sheltered rock bowl between the Malvern Hills and the Black Mountains. This allowed the ground to take the weight of the large receiving dishes, but the most important fact was the lack of background electronic noise. What nearby electronic noise there was is said to compare to the strength of heat felt on the Moon from an electric fireplace on Earth.

== History ==
The site first went into service in September 1978 on the site of the disused World War II airfield RAF Madley, built in 1940.

== Structures ==
There are over 65 dishes, the smallest being 90 centimetres (35 in) with the three main dishes each having a diameter of 32 metres (105 ft) and weighing 290 tonnes. Madley 1, the first of the dishes, tracks a satellite about 22,236 miles (35,785 km) away, positioned over the Equator in geostationary orbit. The site covers a range from 66 degrees east to 314 degrees east, covering two thirds of the planet.

== Transmissions ==
Madley was the first UK satellite site to transmit a fully digital transmission via time division multiple access (TDMA).

Until its closure in 2008, Goonhilly in Cornwall provided a similar role.

== Other use of grounds ==
The grounds are leased as an educational nature reserve, Madley Environmental Study Centre.
