= St Mary's Church, Tenbury Wells =

Church of St Mary the Virgin
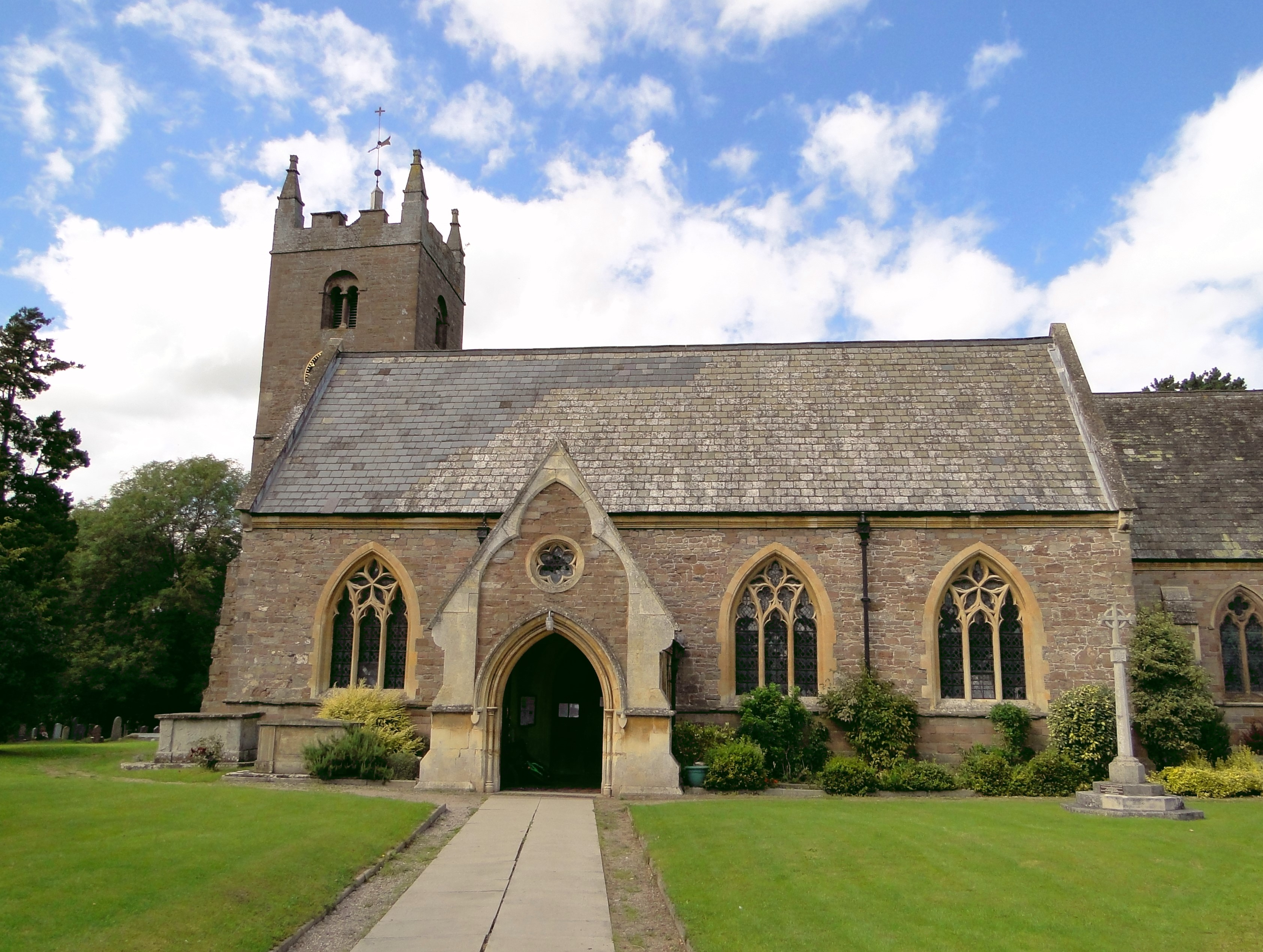
- Church of St Mary the Virgin
- 52°18′42.84″N 2°35′46.82″W
- OS grid reference: SO 59442 68368
- Country: England
- Denomination: Church of England
- Website: www.tenburyteam.co.uk/tenbury_wells.html

Architecture
- Heritage designation: Grade II*
- Designated: 18 April 1966

Administration
- Diocese: Hereford

St Mary's Church is an Anglican church in Tenbury Wells, in Worcestershire, England. The church dates from the 12th and 14th centuries, with later rebuilding and renovation. It in the Diocese of Hereford, and is Grade II* listed.

== History and description ==
The oldest part of the church is the tower, of the mid 12th century. In the 14th century the nave and chancel were rebuilt, and north and south aisles were created, producing the present layout.

The church is situated near the River Teme; there was a serious flood in 1770, and much of the church had to be rebuilt. The east and south walls of the south aisle were rebuilt, and the walls of the north aisle were repaired.

There was restoration in 1864 to the plans of Henry Woodyer, the architect of the Church of St Michael and All Angels, built near Tenbury in the 1850s. There was another flood on 14 May 1886; in the south aisle there is a brass plate indicating the height to which the flood water rose.

=== Interior ===
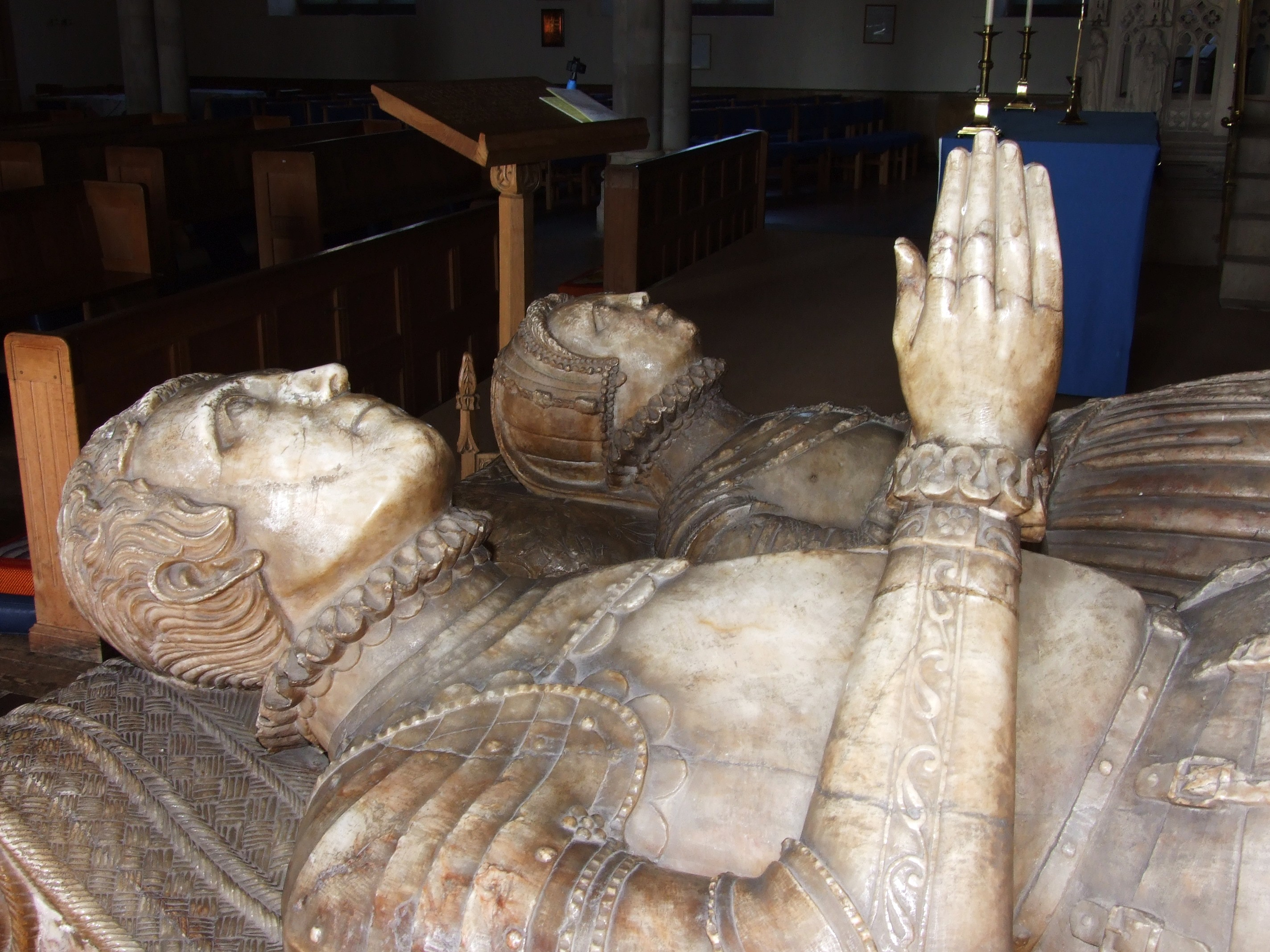
Tomb of Thomas Acton of Sutton, and his wife Mary

Between the nave and aisles there are four-bay arcades, with pointed arches, on pillars with a quatrefoil plan, and there is a pointed chancel arch. The chancel, nave and aisles have open timber trussed roofs. There is a west gallery. There is a stone pulpit, with figure reliefs, and a stone font. All these features date from the 19th century. The south porch, organ chamber and vestry date from the late 19th century.

There are memorials in the chancel, and in the north and south aisles.

An alabaster tomb at the east end of the south aisle has well-detailed recumbent effigies of Thomas Acton of Sutton (died 1546) and his wife Mary (died 1564). Panels on the tomb have the images of their two sons Lancellot and Gabriell, who died in infancy, shown as kneeling youths; another panel shows their daughter and heir Joyce, who erected the tomb in 1581. She married the politician Thomas Lucy.

== Churchyard ==
The churchyard contains six Commonwealth war graves, of an officer and four soldiers of the British Army from World War I and a Royal Air Force warrant officer of World War II.
