= Magnae =

Magnae (Latin for "The Greats") may refer to:

- Magnae Carvetiorum (Carovoran) in northern Britain
- Magnae Dobunnorum (Kenchester) in southwestern Britain
