= Stretton Sugwas =

Village in Herefordshire, England

Coordinates: 52.078°N 2.783°W

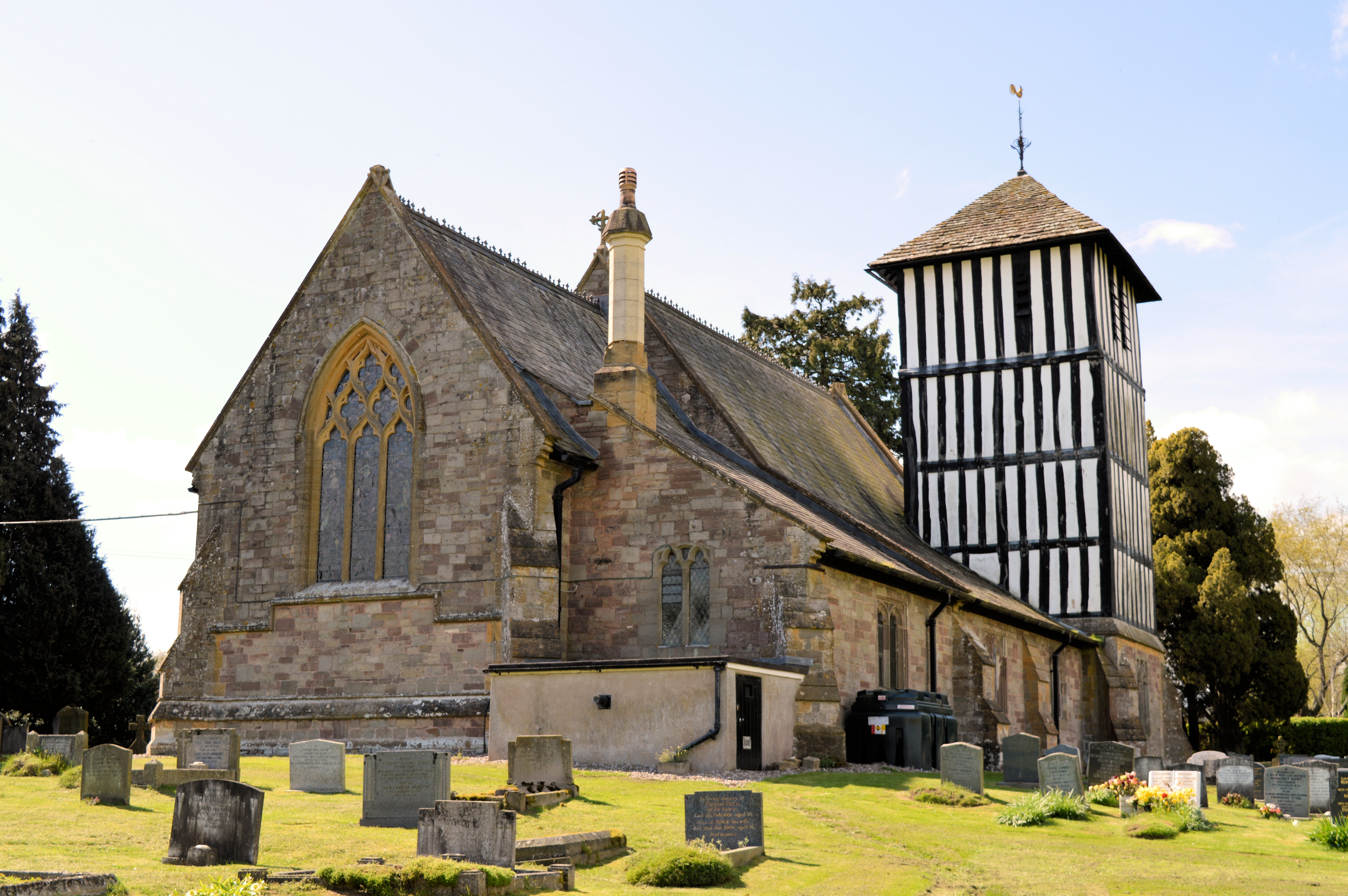
- Church of St Mary Magdalene, Stretton Sugwas

- Location within Herefordshire
- Population: 505 (2011 Census)
- Unitary authority: Herefordshire
- Shire county: Herefordshire
- Region: West Midlands
- Country: England
- Sovereign state: United Kingdom
- Post town: Hereford
- Postcode district: HR4
- Police: West Mercia
- Fire: Hereford and Worcester
- Ambulance: West Midlands
- UK Parliament: North Herefordshire

Stretton Sugwas (/ˈstrɛtən ˈsʌɡəs/ STRET-ən SUG-əs) is a village and civil parish in Herefordshire, England, about 4 miles (6.4 km) northwest of Hereford. The parish also includes the hamlet of Swainshill. The population of this Civil Parish at the 2011 census was 505. In 1087 the village was held by Roger de Lacy and consisted of two and a half hides paying geld, in demesne there was 2 ploughs, 1 villan, 9 bordars, 4 oxmen, and 2 radknights, as well as a mill rendering 32d. The village had increased in value from 40 to 50s from the time of the conquest to that of Domesday. The village lies within the ancient Hundred of Grimsworth

== Etymology ==
The toponym element stretton refers to a farmstead or village on a Roman road, which in this case passes east–west through the village. Sugwas derives from Sugwas Pool and means either "alluvial land frequented by sparrows" or "marshy alluvial land".

== Notable sites ==
Stretton Sugwas never had a railway station of its own, although the route of the old Hay and Brecon line can still be traced alongside the old Roman Road and into Credenhill. The old Roman Road also can still be walked up to the old Roman town of Magnis (Kenchester). The church is dedicated to St Mary Magdalene. Opposite the church is the village hall and on the T junction at the end of the village is a war memorial.

The only public house in the main village was the Traveller's Rest, which was at the opposite end of the village, there are currently no open public houses in the village. It also has a village school which has become an academy. The nearest post office was Credenhill until 2012 when it was closed; now the nearest post office is on Kings Acre Road. The Priory Hotel occupies the former rectory site near to the original church. This church had to move to its current siting in the 1870s due to subsidence in its original siting.

== Swainshill ==
Further down the A438 road from the war memorial is the hamlet of Swainshill, part of Stretton Sugwas civil parish. In Swainshill, the former Kites Nest pub became an Indian Restaurant, the Basmati, most recently demolished to make way for housing. Not far from Swainshill is the National Trust's The Weir Garden.

== New Roman Road and Cattle Market ==
In 2003-04 the main Roman Road leading to Stretton Sugwas and Credenhill, for a long time just a narrow country lane was improved. This was not without local objections to begin with, however the economic benefit to the village has no doubt been improved with the construction of a new cattle market at the current outskirts of the village. This new site has seen up to a 59% increase in trade compared to the old city centre site.

== Otter tunnel ==
In February 2012 an Otter tunnel was opened under the A438 road allowing the otters safe access to the River Wye. This was constructed as part of the Yazor Brook flood defences project.
