= Tyberton =

Village in Herefordshire, England

Coordinates: 52.051630°N 2.9028768°W

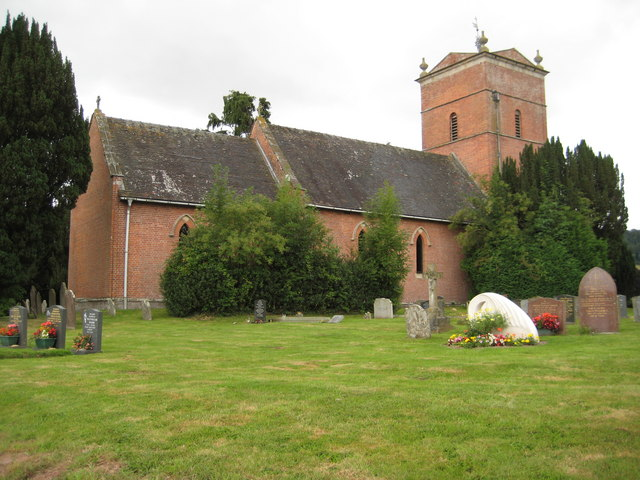

- Location within Herefordshire
- Area: 9.090 km^{2} (3.510 sq mi)
- Population: 178 (2011 census)
  - Density: 20/km^{2} (52/sq mi)
- Civil parish: Tyberton
- Unitary authority: County of Herefordshire
- Shire county: Herefordshire
- Region: West Midlands
- Country: England
- Sovereign state: United Kingdom
- Police: West Mercia
- Fire: Hereford and Worcester
- Ambulance: West Midlands

Tyberton or Tiberton is a village and civil parish 8 miles (13 km) west of Hereford, in the county of Herefordshire, England. In 2011 the parish had a population of 178. The parish touches Blakemere, Madley, Peterchurch, Preston on Wye and Vowchurch. Tyberton shares a parish council with Blakemere, Bredwardine, Moccas and Preston-on-Wye called "Wyeside Group Parish Council".

== Landmarks ==
There are 9 listed buildings in Tyberton. Tyberton has a church dedicated to St Mary.

== History ==
The name "Tyberton" means 'Tidbeorht's farm/settlement'. Tyberton was recorded in the Domesday Book as Tibrintintune.
