= Kinnerton =

Kinnerton may refer to:

- Higher Kinnerton, Flintshire, Wales
- Lower Kinnerton, Cheshire, England
- Kinnerton, Powys, Wales
- Kinnerton Street, Belgravia, London
