= Preston on Wye =

Village in Herefordshire, England

Coordinates: 52°04′N 2°54′W

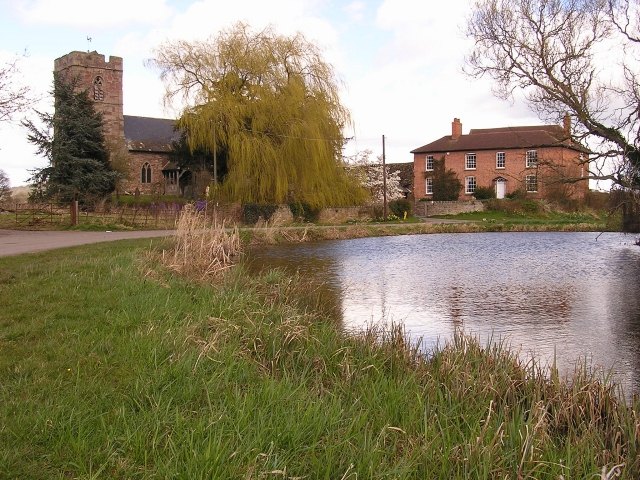

- Location within Herefordshire
- Unitary authority: Herefordshire
- Shire county: Herefordshire
- Region: West Midlands
- Country: England
- Sovereign state: United Kingdom
- Post town: Hereford
- Postcode district: HR2
- Police: West Mercia
- Fire: Hereford and Worcester
- Ambulance: West Midlands
- UK Parliament: Hereford and South Herefordshire

Preston on Wye is a village and civil parish in Herefordshire, England. It is situated near the River Wye, about 9 miles west of Hereford. Nearby places are Monnington on Wye, Lulham and Moccas.

It was a nascent town in the 13th century, its tradesmen mentioned alongside those of Bromyard, Ledbury, and Ross-on-Wye in a mandate of Henry III of November 1272 as entitled to trade in the city of Hereford "free from toll and all other exactions". But as with other projected towns in medieval Herefordshire like Wigmore it never developed fully.

Village events include plays and medieval banquets by the local drama group, The POW Players. There is a newly refurbished village hall and a pub (The Yew Tree), also a Church of England Church, St Lawrence's, a Baptist Chapel and a Methodist Chapel. There is a bi-weekly bus service into Hereford and daily buses to the local primary school in Madley and secondary school in Kingstone. The village hall hosts the local community access point "Cow Pats" twice weekly on Wednesday nights and Saturdays, providing a rural cybercafé.

According to the Book of Llandaff a local warrior prince, Gwrfoddw, who was king of Ergyng, after a victory in battle over the Saxons granted land at Bolgros to Bishop Ufelfyw - Bolgros was said to be "on the banks of the Wye, at some distance from Mochros (now Moccas)" - in thanksgiving for the victory. Bolgros is believed to have been Preston-on-Wye, and a church was built on the site of the present church, dedicated to the Holy Trinity, St Peter, St Dubricius and St Teilo.

The village has two seasonal campsites located close to the River Wye for canoeists.
