= Church of St Michael and All Angels, Kingsland =

- Church of St Michael and All Angels, Kingsland
- 52°14′49.2″N 2°48′41.9″W
- OS grid reference: SO 44683 61287
- Location: Kingsland, Herefordshire
- Country: England
- Denomination: Church of England
- Website: kingslandchurch.co.uk

Administration
- Diocese: Diocese of Hereford

Listed Building – Grade I
- Official name: Church of St Michael
- Designated: 11 June 1959
- Reference no.: 1167022

The Church of St Michael and All Angels is an Anglican church in the village of Kingsland, in Herefordshire, England. It is in the Diocese of Hereford. The building dates from the early 14th century, with some later additions of the 15th and 16th centuries. It is Grade I listed.

== History and description ==
Building of the church was begun in the late 13th century by Maud de Braose, widow of Roger Mortimer, 1st Baron Mortimer of Wigmore Castle. He was lord of the manor, and died in 1282. After Maud's death in 1301, construction continued under Edmund Mortimer, 2nd Baron Mortimer and his wife Margaret. She continued the supervision of the construction after her husband's death in 1304. Two small lancet windows survive from an earlier church on the site.

There is a chancel and nave, aisles, west tower, a timber-framed south porch dating from the 15th century, a north vestry, of which the upper storey was added in the 16th century, and a north porch with adjoining Volka Chapel.

The tower has five stages; the lower four are of the 14th century, with the top stage added in the 15th century, on which there is a crenellated parapet and carved gargoyles. There are stepped buttresses at the outer corners of the tower. There are eight bells.

=== Interior ===
The chancel, showing the east window and barrel roof

The east window is of the 14th century; details include Christ in Glory, the Coronation of the Virgin, Tobias and the Angel, and there are coats of arms including that of Maud de Braose. There are other 14th-century windows in the north and south walls of the chancel. For the duration of World War II, the east window was removed and buried on a local hillside.

To the right of the altar in a piscina and a three-seat sedilla, with seats of different heights.

There was restoration of the chancel in 1866–68 by George Frederick Bodley. His work includes the barrel roof: it shows the IHC Christogram, and the central column shows the names of classes of angels; around the border, words from Psalm 148, in Latin, are inscribed. Also part of Bodley's restoraton are the encaustic tiles on the floor of the chancel.

The Lady Chapel is at the east end of the south aisle. It was founded as a chantry chapel by Edward IV after the Battle of Mortimer's Cross in 1461. Above the altar there is a framed cartoon by Sir Frank Brangwyn, of the Crucifixion, created for a projected stained glass window.

The font, dating from the 14th century, has an octagonal bowl and a plain stem. The pews date from the 19th century. The organ, installed in 1883, was rebuilt in 1969 by Nicholsons of Malvern.

Among the memorials in the church is a brass plaque, a memorial to John Gethin of Kingsland, and his wife and children. They died in 1896 when the ship Drummond Castle, in which they were passengers, struck rocks near Ushant, near Brittany, and sank. Their bodies were never recovered.

Restoration, for which funding was granted in 2020, was completed in 2022, and the church was afterwards re-opened by Richard Jackson, Bishop of Hereford.

=== Volka Chapel ===
The Volka Chapel

The Volka Chapel, contemporary with the church, adjoins the north porch on the left. It is small, and it is thought it may be a chantry chapel, dedicated to Margaret Mortimer, who oversaw the completion of the church. There is a stone coffin in the chapel; it was opened in 1826, and found to contain the remains of a woman and infant. They were buried in the churchyard.

=== Churchyard ===
There is a war memorial in the churchyard, about 45 metres (148 ft) east of the chancel, erected about 1920. It was made by W. G. Storr Barber, originally of Leominster; his other works include a statue for the war memorial in Leominster, and memorials in Hereford and Worcester. There is a wheel cross on a tapered shaft. The memorial is listed Grade II.

There is a churchyard cross about 15 metres (49 ft) south of the church, probably of the 15th century. It has an octagonal shaft, broken at about 1.5 metres (4 ft 11 in), above an octagonal socket stone. It is listed Grade II.

== See also ==
- Grade I listed buildings in Herefordshire
