= RAF Madley =

Former RAF station in Herefordshire, England

RAF Madley
- Near Madley, Herefordshire in England
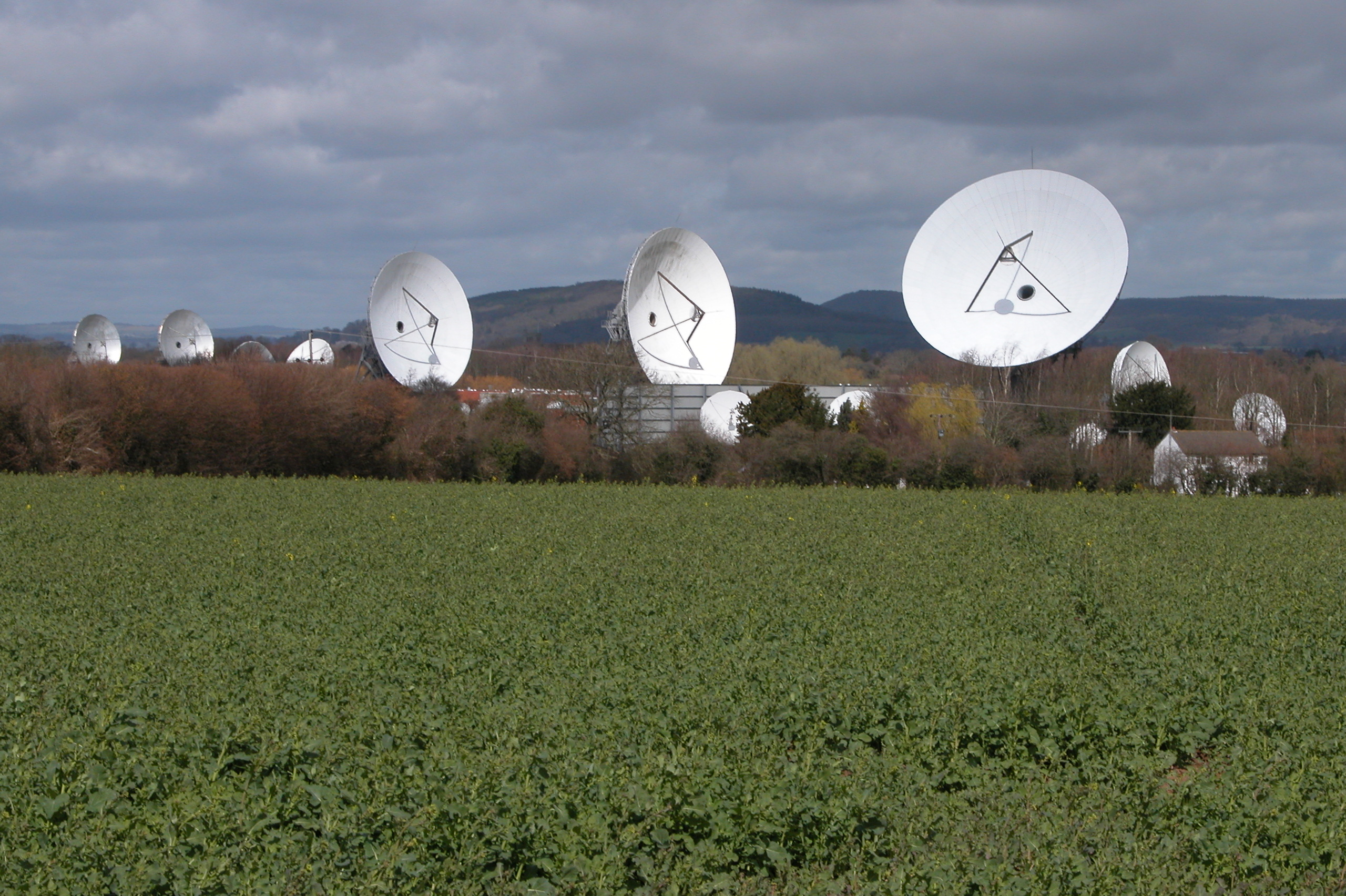
- Madley Communications Centre earth satellite tracking station

Site information
- Type: Royal Air Force station
- Owner: Air Ministry
- Operator: Royal Air Force
- Controlled by: RAF Flying Training Command

Location
- Shown within Herefordshire RAF Madley (the United Kingdom)
- Coordinates: 52°01′55″N 002°50′56″W

Site history
- Built: 1941
- In use: 1941 - 1947
- Battles/wars: European theatre of World War II

Airfield information
- Elevation: 81 metres (266 ft) AMSL
Runways
Direction	Length and surface
00/00	1,005 metres (3,297 ft) Concrete/Tarmac
00/00	1,005 metres (3,297 ft) Concrete/Tarmac
00/00	1,280 metres (4,199 ft) Concrete/Tarmac

Royal Air Force Madley or more simply RAF Madley is a former Royal Air Force station situated 6.2 miles (10 km) south west of Hereford in Herefordshire, England. The station was in use during the Second World War as a training base and was located between the villages of Kingstone and Madley.

== History ==
The site opened as a training centre for aircrew and ground wireless operators on 27 August 1941. In 1941, No. 4 Signals School RAF was stated up at the base. The school was disbanded and renamed as No. 4 Radio School RAF in January 1943.

In 1943, the grass airfield was reinforced with Sommerfeld Tracking and the centre's population rose to about 5,000. Also in 1943, RAF Madley became a base for one of ten Royal Air Force Mountain Rescue Teams (MRT) that had been set up to rescue lost aircrew. The site was visited in 1944 prior to D-Day by US General George S. Patton, and later by Rudolf Hess (who had been held prisoner near Abergavenny) on his way to the Nuremberg Trials in 1946.

The station was not bombed by the Luftwaffe, however, as with other bases, crashes of friendly aircraft were commonplace. On Christmas Day 1944, a Liberator crashed in the station environs which precipitated the usual search for the crew. This had proved fruitless as the crew had baled out over Belgium as they assumed the heavily flak-damaged aircraft was about to crash. However, the aircraft somehow made it all the way to Madley without its aircrew.

The comedian and actor Eric Sykes was a radio operator at RAF Madley during the Second World War.

== Units posted here ==
- No. 4 Radio School (January 1943 - December 1946)
- No. 4 Signals School (August 1941 - January 1943)
- No. 8 Anti-Aircraft Co-operation Unit RAF (July 1941 – 1943)
- No. 25 Maintenance Unit RAF (April 1952 - March 1954)
- No. 26 Squadron RAF detachment during 1942 using the North American Mustang I
- No. 50 Gliding School RAF (January 1946– January 1947)

== Current use ==
Today only a few hangars remain, and Madley Communications Centre now occupies part of the site. Other parts of the site have been converted into a wildlife wetlands centre that is used for study. The B4352 and an unclassified road now cut what was the airfield area in two.

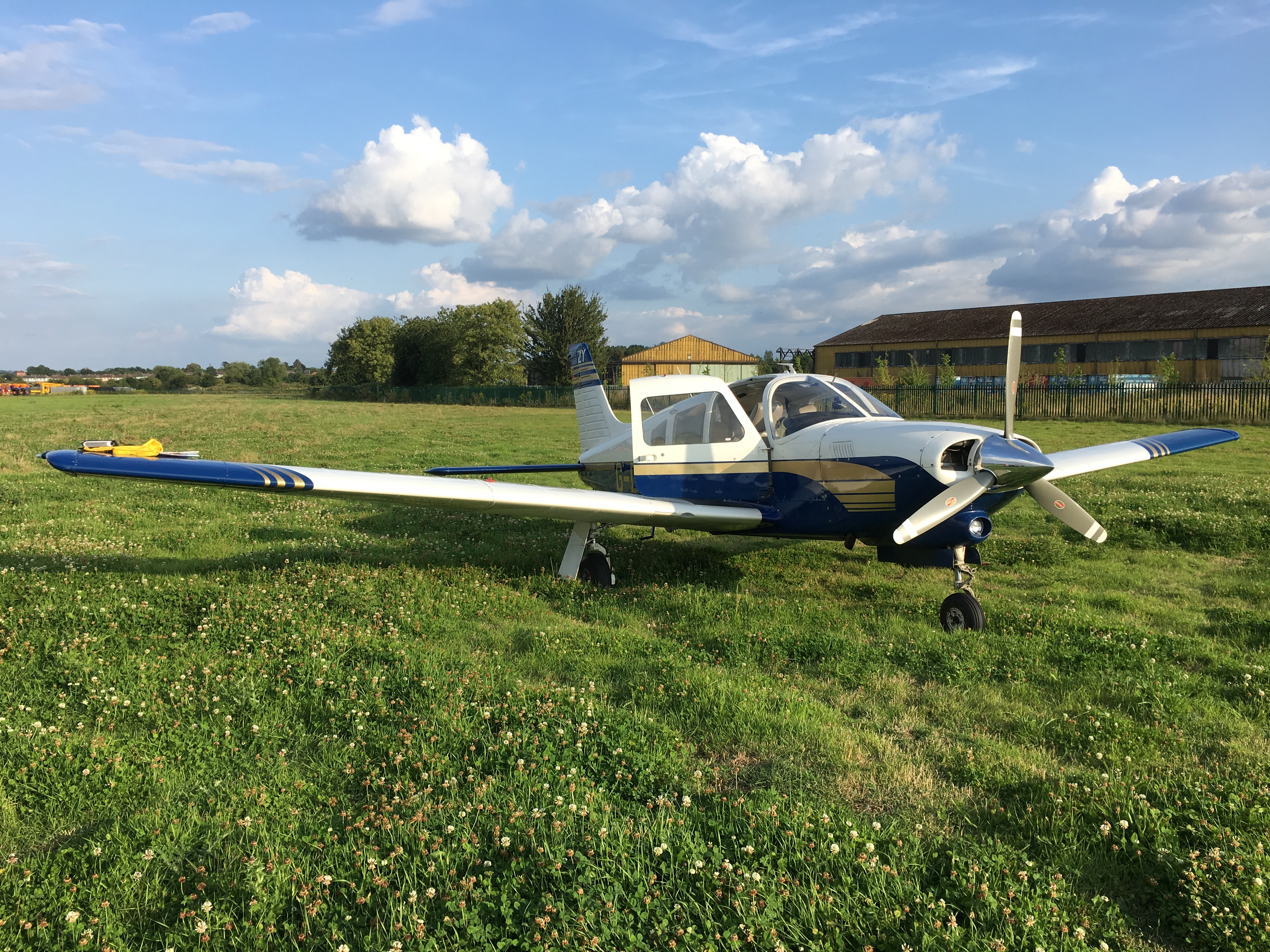
Piper Arrow aircraft at RAF Madley after engine failure, 1 August 2019

On 1 August 2019 a Piper Arrow single engined aeroplane registered G-DIZY suffered an engine failure and made an emergency landing on the grass south of the runway intersections. It was later dismantled and removed by road for repair.

== See also ==
- List of former Royal Air Force stations
