= Church of St Mary Magdalene, Stretton Sugwas =

Church of St Mary Magdalene
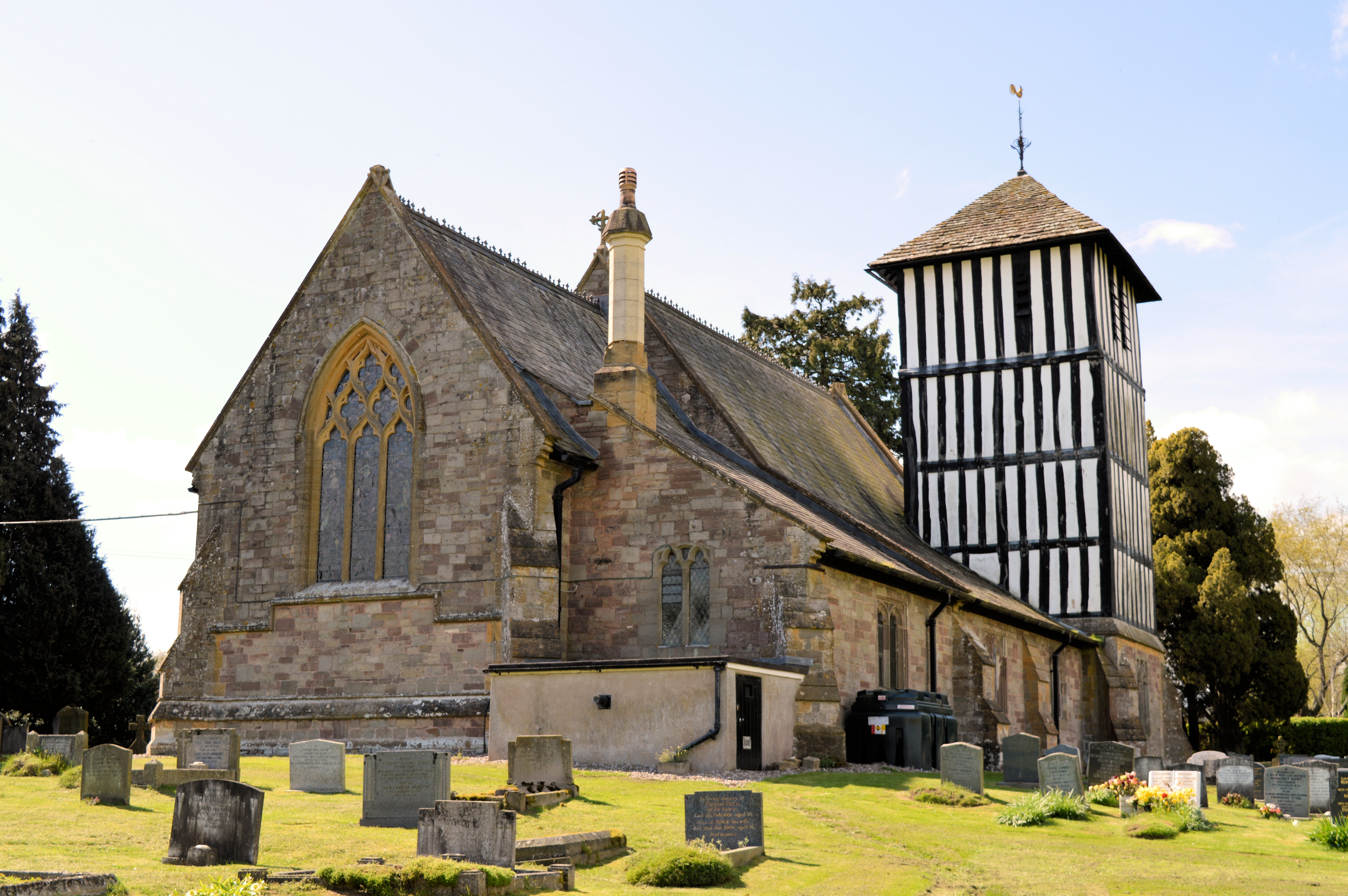
- Viewed from the north-east
- Church of St Mary Magdalene
- 52°4′26.400″N 2°47′23.316″W
- OS grid reference: SO 460 420
- Location: Stretton Sugwas, Herefordshire
- Country: England
- Denomination: Church of England

History
- Dedication: Mary Magdalene

Architecture
- Heritage designation: Grade II*
- Designated: 27 January 1967
- Architect: William Cheiake
- Completed: 1880

Administration
- Diocese: Diocese of Hereford

The Church of St Mary Magdalene is an Anglican church in the village of Stretton Sugwas, in Herefordshire, England. The church is in the Burghill Benefice. The building, dating from the late 19th century, incorporates features from the earlier 12th-century church. It is Grade II* listed.

== Description ==
The church was built in 1877–1880 by William Cheiake of Hereford. It is of sandstone, with a roof of Welsh slate; the tower in the north-west has a timber-framed upper part, similar to the 16th-century tower of St Bartholomew's Church at Holmer.

The former church of Stretton Sugwas, built about 1150 and in disrepair by the 1870s, was demolished; the floor plan is visible in the grounds of the Priory Hotel in the village. Pieces were re-used in the new building. Timbers from the old church were incorporated in the tower; Romanesque arches in the south doorway, and in the doorways leading into the tower, are from the old church. Some of the windows were re-set from the old church. Windows in the chancel are 19th-century: two 2-light windows in the south of the chancel and the east window of 3 lights with tracery.

The font is medieval. In the south wall of the nave is an incised slab, from the old church, to Richard Greenway (or Grevelhay) and his wife (1473). The 19th-century screen at the entrance to the vestry incorporates parts of the 15th-century chancel screen from the old church.

There are four bells in the tower: bells 1 to 4 are dated respectively 1671, 1813, 1930 and 1706. The former no. 3 bell, which is cracked, stands at the back of the north aisle.

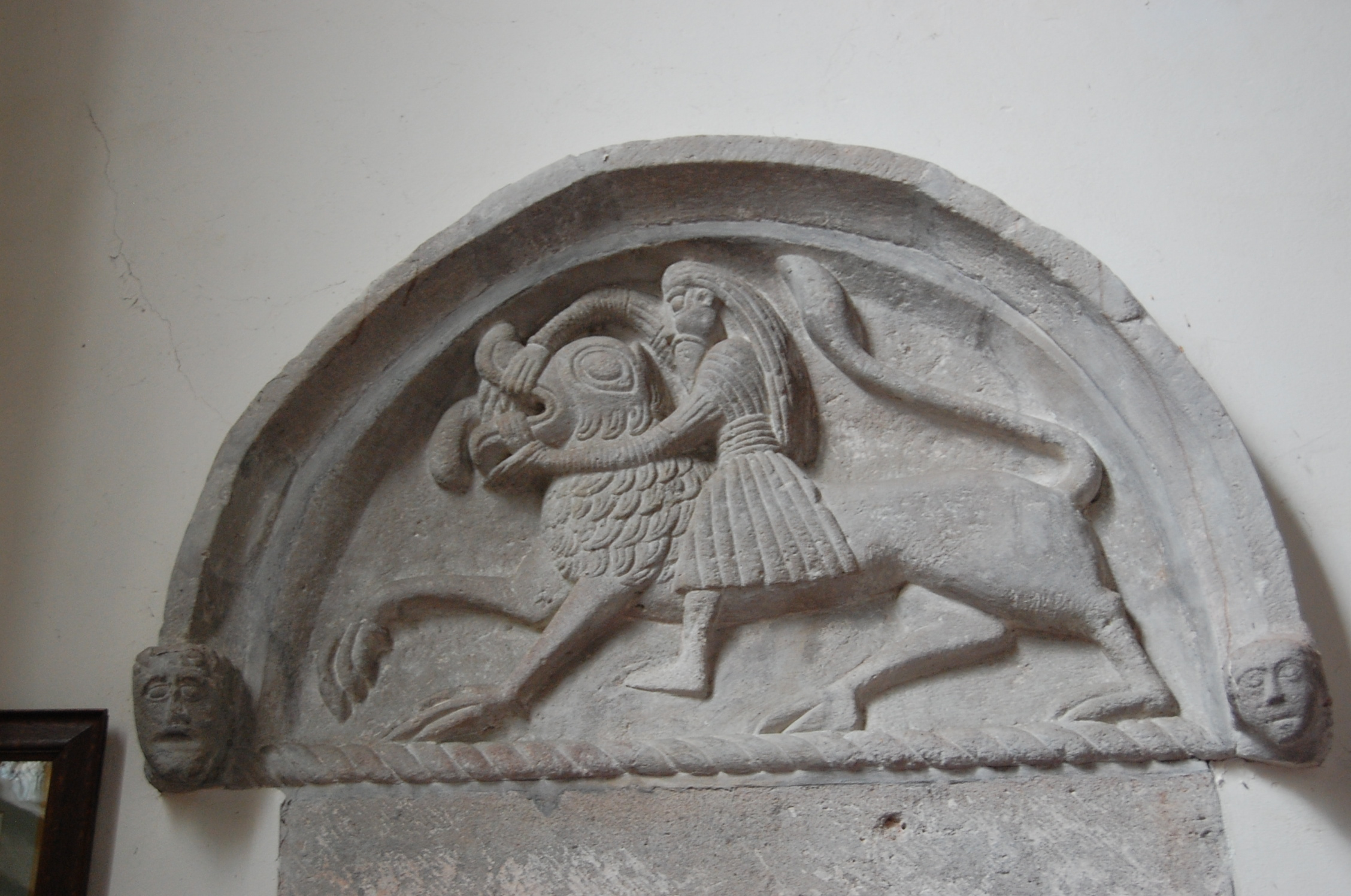
Tympanum of Samson and the lion

The Samson Tympanum, installed from the old church, is a particularly notable feature. It is situated is above the door to the tower, opposite the south door. A relief carving shows Samson astride a lion and forcing its jaws open. It is thought to have been created by a medieval sculptor known as the Chief Master, working under the patronage of Ralph de Baskerville.
