= The Weir Garden =

National Trust property in Herefordshire, England

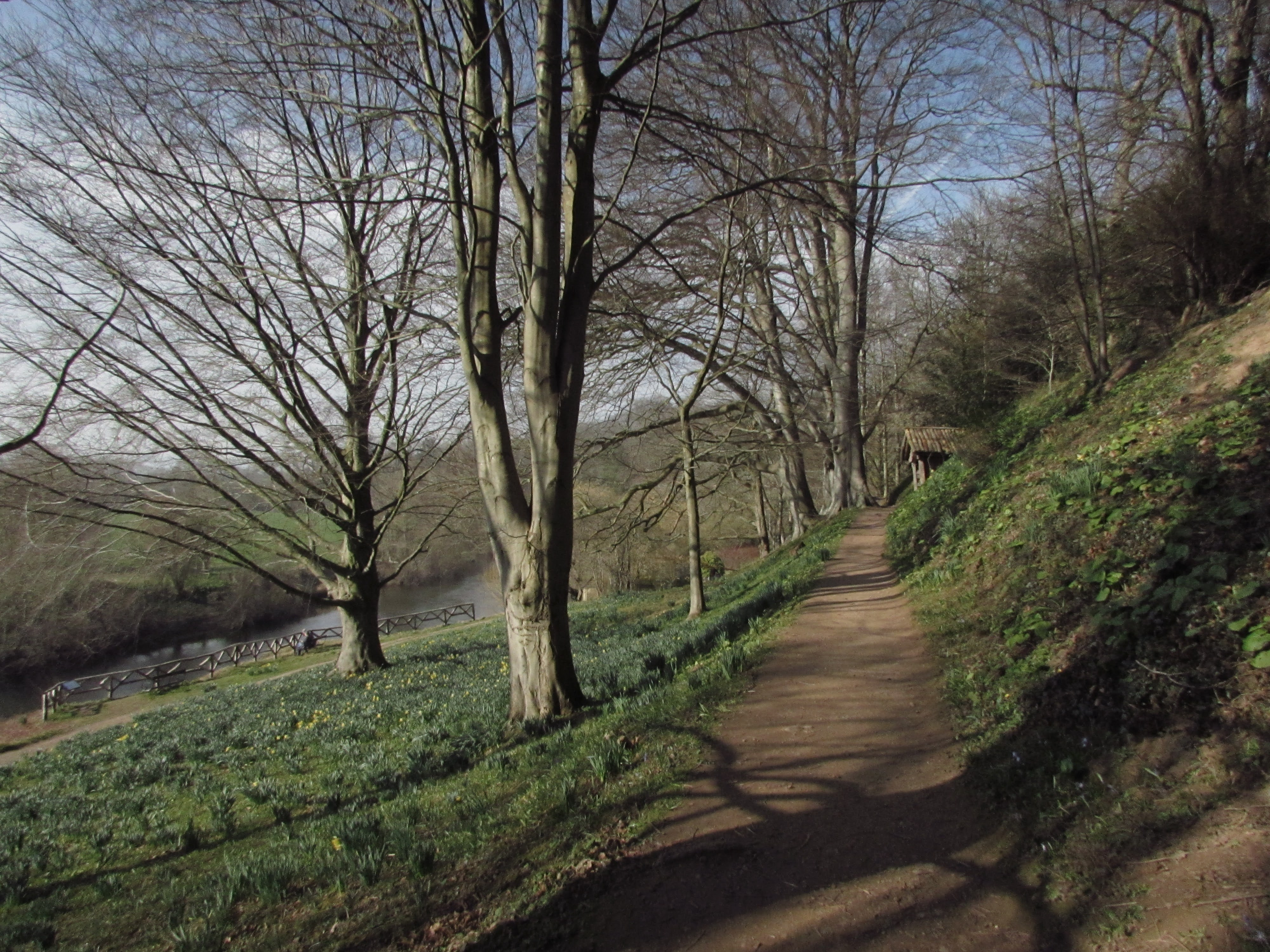
- A footpath in the Weir Garden.

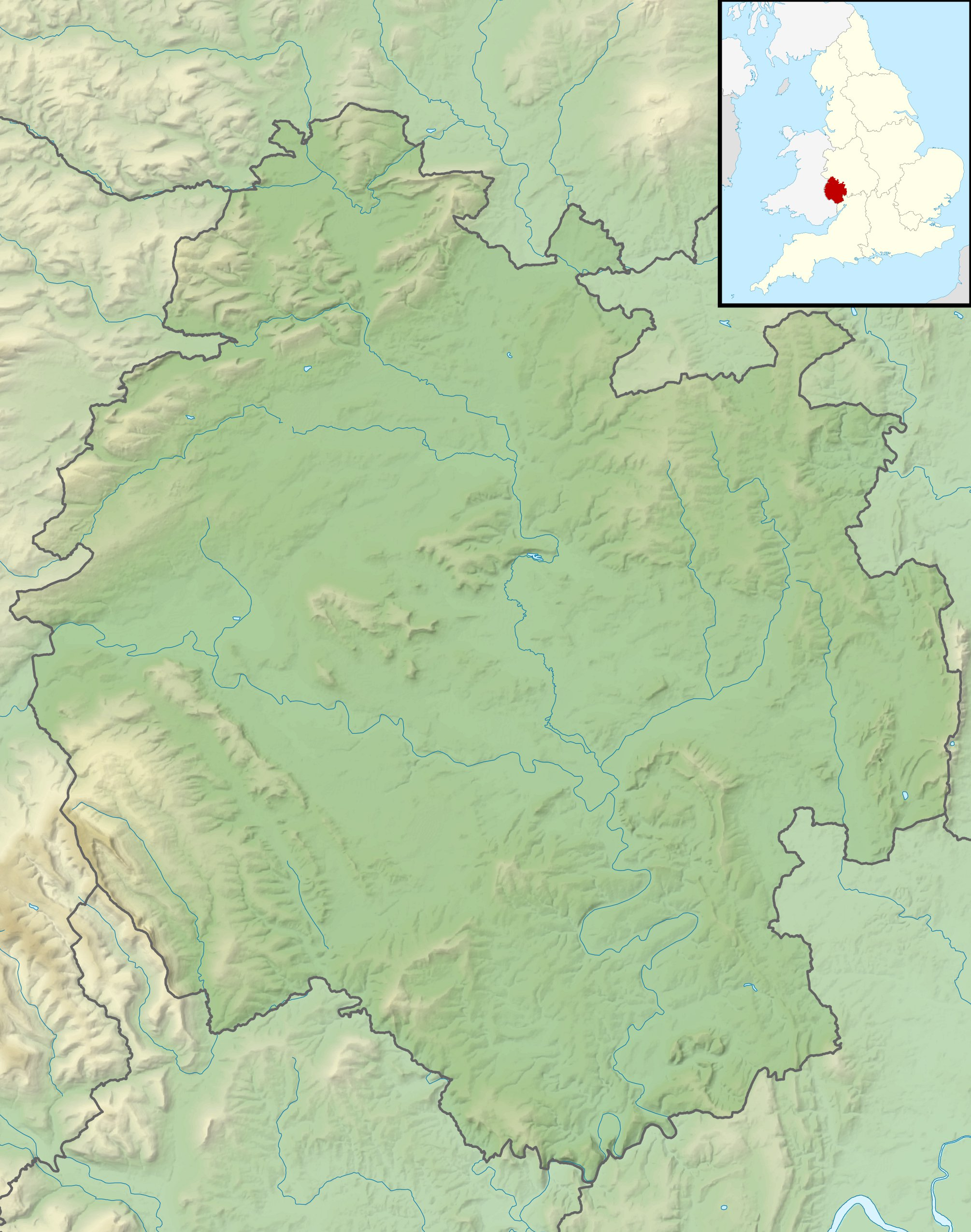
- Location within Herefordshire
- Interactive map of The Weir Garden
- Location: Stretton Sugwas
- Nearest city: Hereford
- OS grid: SO 43505 41913
- Coordinates: 52°04′21″N 02°49′32″W
- Water: River Wye
- Website: https://www.nationaltrust.org.uk/visit/worcestershire-herefordshire/the-weir-garden

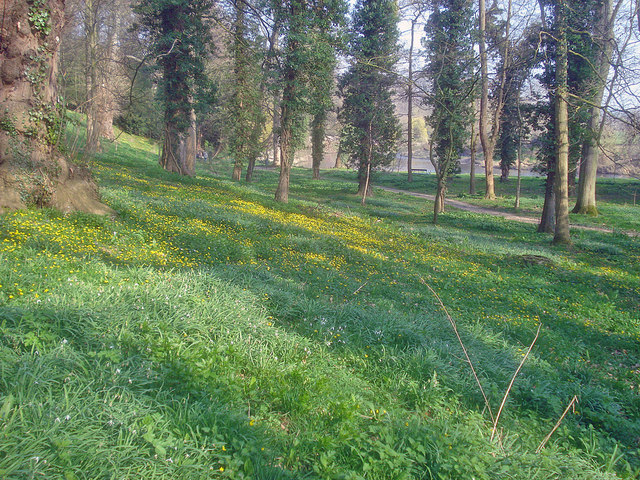
Western end of the Weir Gardens.

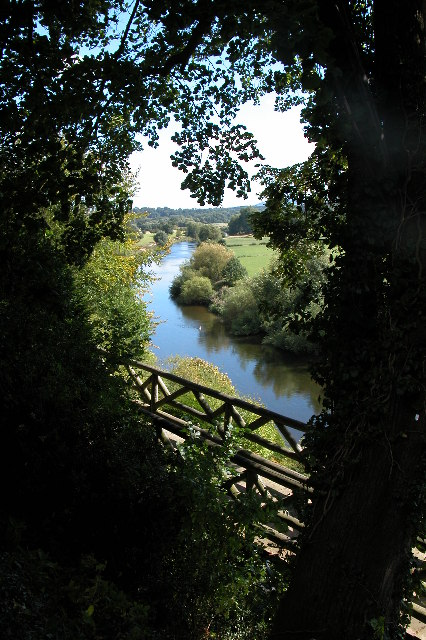
The Weir Gardens and the River Wye.

The Weir Garden is a National Trust property near Swainshill (see Stretton Sugwas), Herefordshire, lying alongside the River Wye 5 mi (8.0 km) west of Hereford on the A438 road.

The garden covers 10 acres (4 hectares), and was the creation of its prior owner, Roger Parr, and his head gardener, William Boulter. The adjoining house is used as a nursing home and is not open to the public.

The south-facing aspect of the garden allows for a wide variety of plantings, and this, combined with the riverside, attracts a notable variety of wildlife. Notable birds include blackcaps, mute swans, kingfishers, goosanders and in summer, sand martins, whilst teal often over-winter here. There are also a great many insects, including the rare club-tailed dragonfly, banded demoiselle damselflies and white-legged damselflies, as well as a range of butterflies, hoverflies and crickets.

The ruins of a Roman temple possibly associated with a high-status Roman villa, which may have connections to the nearby Roman town of Magnis, lie inside the Weir Garden by the River Wye. There is an octagonal cistern filled by a spring and a ruined buttress by the river. These are the highest standing Roman ruins in Herefordshire.

As of August 2023, the property is open from 10:30 to 16:30, every day until 5 November and then from 10:30 to 16:00 on weekends, except Christmas Eve, for the rest of the year.
