= Kingstone High School =

Location
- Kingstone; Herefordshire, HR2 9HJ; England
- Coordinates: 52.0220°N 2.8457°W

Information
- Type: Academy
- Motto: Achieving Success Together
- Local authority: Herefordshire
- Trust: Kingstone Academy Trust
- Department for Education URN: 137073 Tables
- Ofsted: Reports
- Headteacher: Matthew Morris
- Gender: Mixed
- Age: 11 to 16
- Enrolment: 595 as of 11 September 2025
- Capacity: 636
- Colors: Navy blue and daisy yellow
- Website: www.kingstone-high.hereford.sch.uk

Kingstone High School is a mixed secondary school located in Kingstone in the English county of Herefordshire.

Previously a community school administered by Herefordshire Council, Kingstone High School converted to academy status in August 2011. It continues to co-ordinate with Herefordshire Council for admissions and mainly serves the areas of South Hereford and the Golden Valley.

Kingstone High School offers GCSEs and BTECs as programmes of study for pupils. The main school building was built in the 1960s, with other buildings added later.
