= SS Drummond Castle =

UK flagged steamship sank in 1896

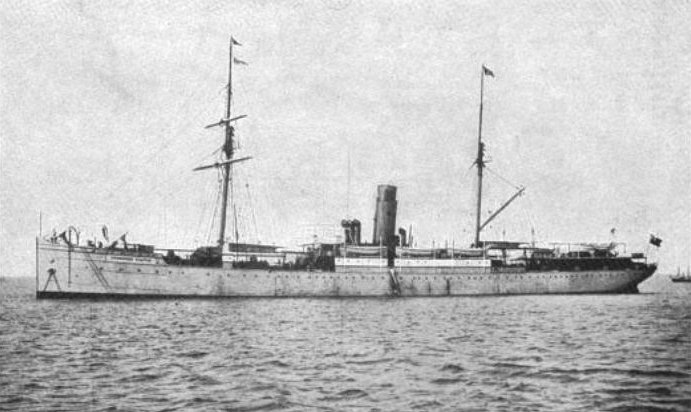
- Drummond Castle

History

- Name: Drummond Castle (1883–1895)
- Operator: Donald Currie & Co. (1881–1896); Castle Mail Packet Company (1896)
- Builder: John Elder & Co., Govan, Glasgow, Scotland
- Yard number: 246
- Launched: 17 February 1881
- Fate: Ran aground and sank 16 June 1896

General characteristics
- Tonnage: 3,706 GRT
- Length: 365 ft (111 m)
- Beam: 43.5 ft (13.3 m)
- Draught: 31.3 ft (9.5 m)

SS Drummond Castle was a steamship built in 1881 by John Elder & Co. of Govan, Glasgow, Scotland, for D. Currie & Co. and later operated by the Castle Mail Packet Company. The ship sank on 16 June 1896 off Ushant.

== Sinking ==
The Drummond Castle departed Cape Town, South Africa, on 28 May 1896 for London via Delagoa Bay, Natal and Las Palmas, with 143 passengers and 102 crew. On 16 June the Drummond Castle was off Ushant, the sea was calm but foggy.

The safe passage past Ushant is to the north, but for an unknown reason the Drummond Castle sailed between Ushant and Molène. Around 23:00 the Drummond Castle struck rocks at the south entrance to the Fronveur Sound, within four minutes the ship had sunk.

Two crew were rescued by Breton fishermen; one passenger managed to reach Molène. The other 242 crew and passengers were drowned. The main cargo was 1,943 bales of wool, skins, hides and horns, weighing 450 tons; the rest was 250 tons of coal.

A Board of Trade wreck inquiry was held in July 1896 in Westminster. The inquiry concluded that the loss was due to "careless or unskillful navigation".
