= Brobury =

Village in Herefordshire, England

Coordinates: 52.094°N 2.957°W

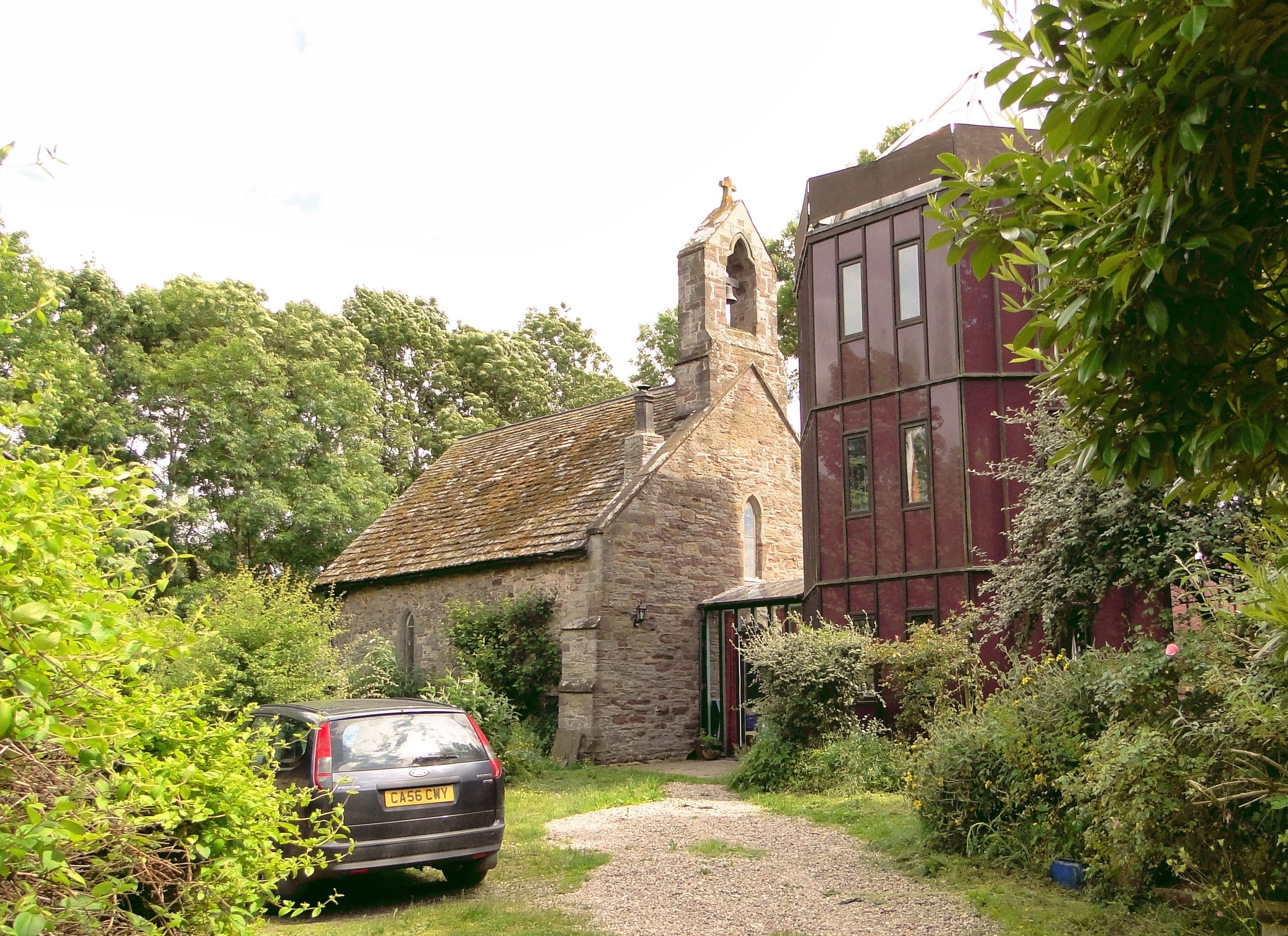
- Former church

- Location within Herefordshire
- Civil parish: Brobury with Monnington on Wye
- Unitary authority: County of Herefordshire
- Ceremonial county: Herefordshire
- Region: West Midlands
- Country: England
- Sovereign state: United Kingdom

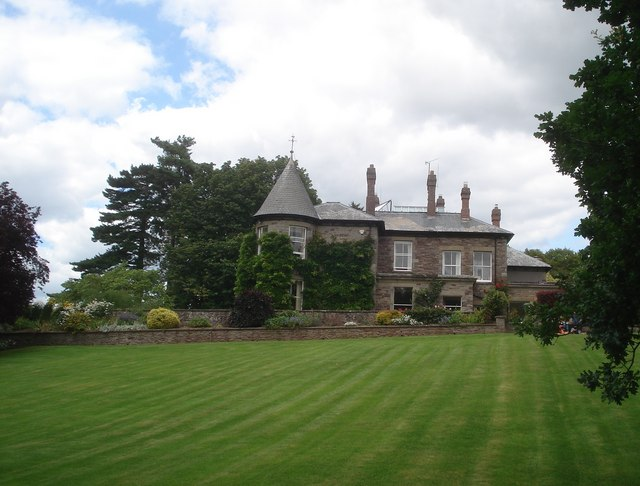
Brobury House

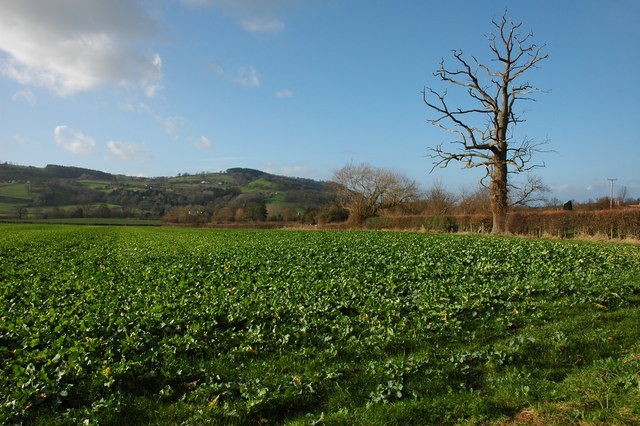
Farmland at Brobury

Brobury is a village and former civil parish, now in the parish of Brobury with Monnington on Wye, in western Herefordshire, England, located between Hereford and Hay-on-Wye. In 1961 the parish had a population of 20. On 1 April 1987 the parish was abolished and merged with Monnington on Wye to form "Brobury with Monnington on Wye".

It lies across the River Wye from Bredwardine.
