= Church of St Michael and All Angels, Tenbury Wells =

Church of St Michael and All Angels
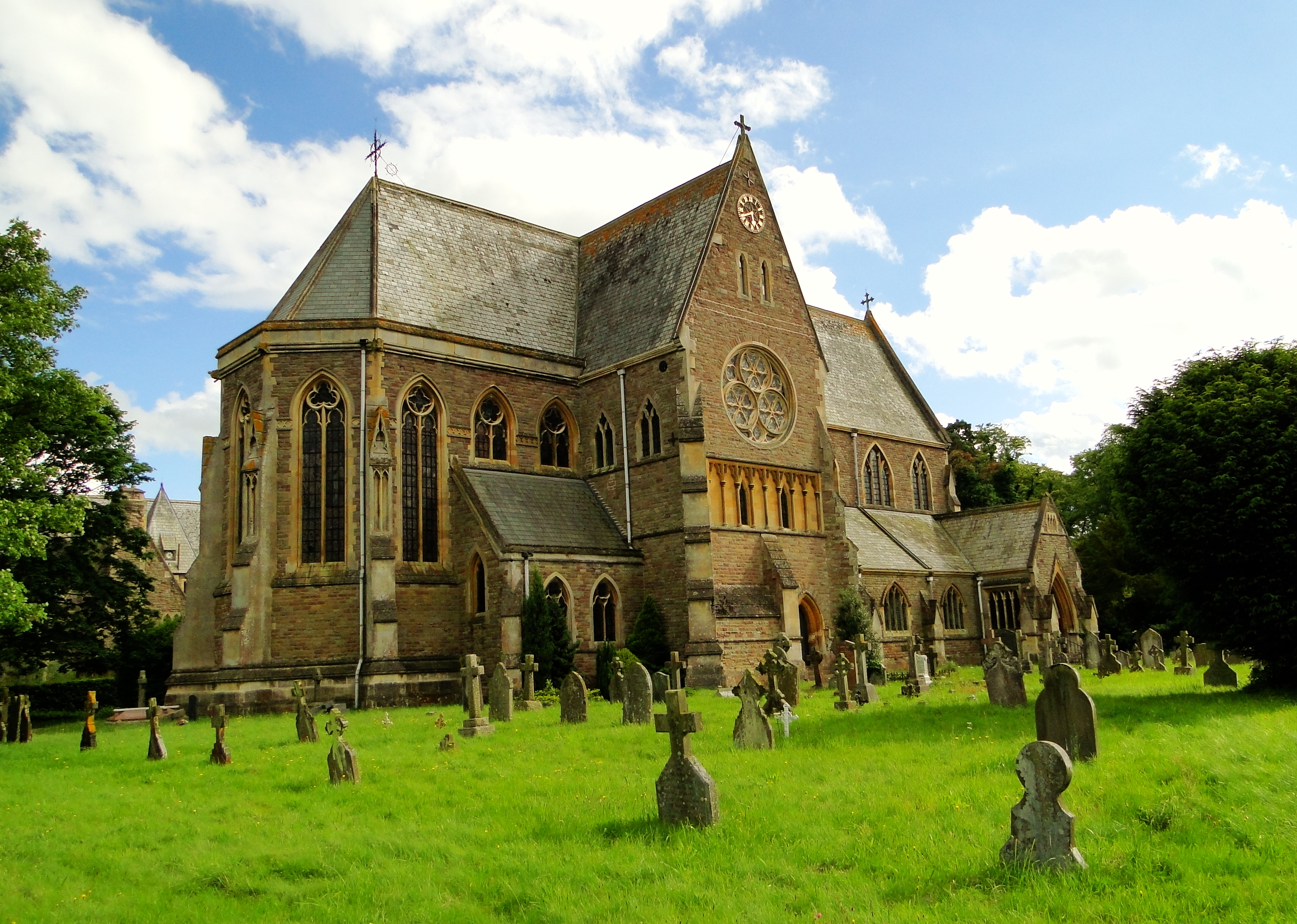
- Church of St Michael and All Angels
- 52°17′17.880″N 2°36′47.628″W
- OS grid reference: SO 58268 65753
- Country: England
- Denomination: Church of England
- Website: www.saintmichaelstenbury.org.uk

History
- Founder: Frederick Ouseley

Architecture
- Heritage designation: Grade II*
- Designated: 24 October 1988
- Architect: Henry Woodyer
- Style: Gothic Revival
- Completed: 1858

Administration
- Diocese: Hereford

The Church of St Michael and All Angels is an Anglican church about 1 mile (1.6 km) south-west of Tenbury Wells, in Worcestershire, England. It was built in 1858 as part of St Michael's College, a former school. The church, in the Diocese of Hereford, is Grade II* listed.

== History ==
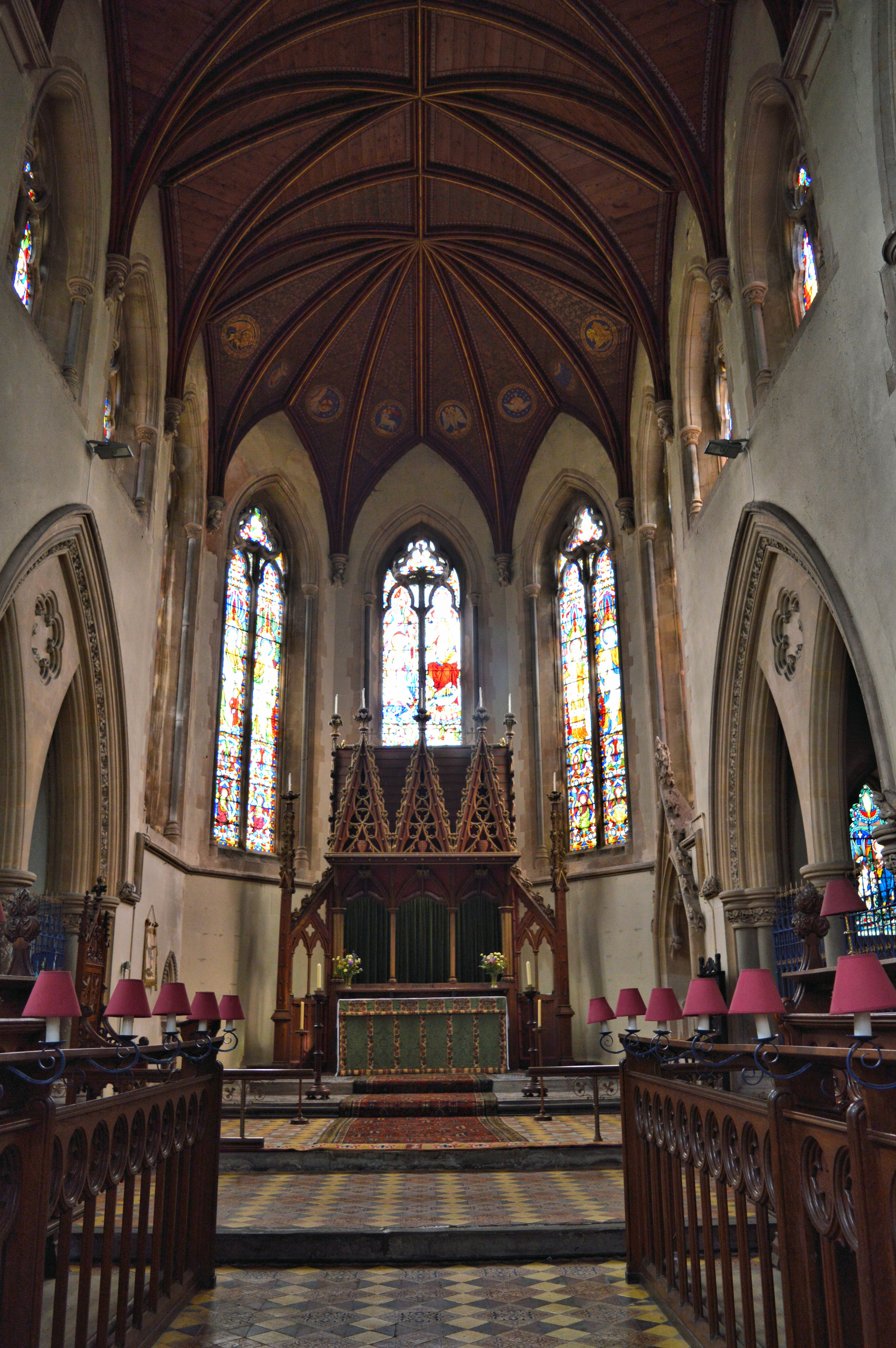
The chancel

The church was part of St Michael's College, a boys' school founded by Sir Frederick Ouseley in 1856. The church and the college buildings were designed by Henry Woodyer, known for his church buildings in Gothic Revival style, and built from 1856 to 1858.

Sir John Betjeman wrote: "Sir Frederick was concerned to train boys who as organists and choristers would be able to maintain the tradition of English cathedral church music.... Ouseley intended St. Michael’s to be what it is—the parish church of the district, with a resident choir and organist supplied from the College attached to it."

Ouseley was the first vicar, and warden of the college, retaining the offices until his death in 1889. John Stainer (1840–1901) was selected by Ouseley to be organist of the church, and was resident for two years from 1857. Stainer, later organist of St Paul's Cathedral, considered his success as a church musician to be largely due to this period at Tenbury.

The church has continued to be a parish church; St Michael's College closed in 1985.

== Description ==
The church is built of coursed sandstone rubble with ashlar dressings. The nave has aisles and a clerestory; there are north and south transepts and an apsidal chancel. Original features include the altar rail, choir stalls, chancel screen, stone pulpit and tiled floors; also the limestone font which has a tall oak cover. There is stained glass by Hardman & Co. The organ by Henry Willis & Sons, replacing an earlier organ, was installed in 1873.
