= Monnington on Wye =

Village in Herefordshire, England

Coordinates: 52°05′10″N 2°55′04″W

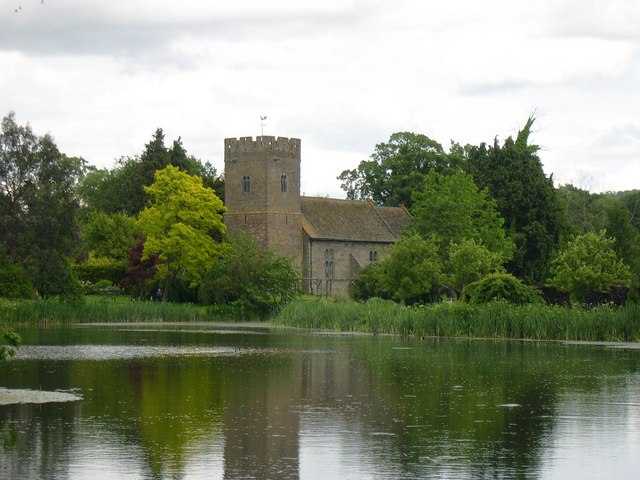
- St Mary's Church

- Location within Herefordshire
- Civil parish: Brobury with Monnington-on-Wye
- Unitary authority: Herefordshire
- Shire county: Herefordshire
- Region: West Midlands
- Country: England
- Sovereign state: United Kingdom
- Post town: Hereford
- Postcode district: HR4
- Police: West Mercia
- Fire: Hereford and Worcester
- Ambulance: West Midlands
- UK Parliament: North Herefordshire

Monnington on Wye is a village and former civil parish, now in the parish of Brobury with Monnington-on-Wye, in western Herefordshire, England, located between Hereford and Hay-on-Wye. In 1961 the parish had a population of 64. On 1 April 1987 the parish was abolished and merged with Brobury to form "Brobury with Monnington on Wye".

The place-name 'Monnington' is first attested in the Domesday Book of 1086, where it appears as Manitune. The name means 'Manna's town or settlement', or 'the town or settlement of Manna's people'.

The church of St Mary's is a grade I listed building.

Monnington Court includes a moot hall, completed before 1230.

Monnington is regarded as a possible location of Owain Glyndŵr's retirement, death and burial.
