= Kinnerton, Powys =

Coordinates: 52°15′38″N 3°06′34″W

Kinnerton
- Location within Powys
- Principal area: Powys
- Preserved county: Powys
- Country: Wales
- Sovereign state: United Kingdom
- Post town: PRESTEIGNE
- Postcode district: LD8
- Dialling code: 01544
- Police: Dyfed-Powys
- Fire: Mid and West Wales
- Ambulance: Welsh
- UK Parliament: Brecon, Radnor and Cwm Tawe

Kinnerton is a village in Powys (historically in Radnorshire), Wales.

Kinnerton first appears in records as Kynardton in 1304, meaning "Cyneheard's farm or settlement".
