= Magnis (Kenchester) =

Coordinates: 52.081°N 2.818°W

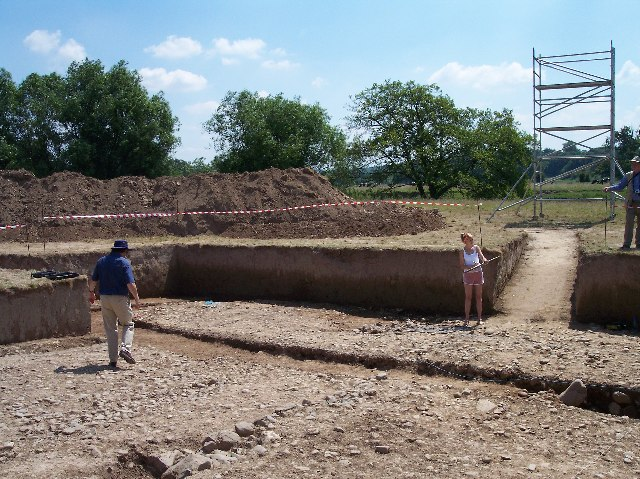
Excavations of the Roman road just south of Magnae in 2005

Magnae, sometimes Magnae Dobunnorum (Latin for "The Greats of the Dobunni") to distinguish it from the Magnae of the Carvetii on Hadrian's Wall in northern Britain, (Note: Both names are sometimes also given as Magnis, the form under which it appears in the Antonine Itinerary owing to Latin's declensions. It is also sometimes misspelled as singular Magna.) was a Romano-British town and an important market centre for the British Dobunni tribe, located near modern-day Kenchester in Herefordshire, England. The town was shaped as an irregular hexagon, with a single main street along the line of the main Roman Road running east–west through the area, and an irregular pattern of side streets with tightly packed buildings leading off it.

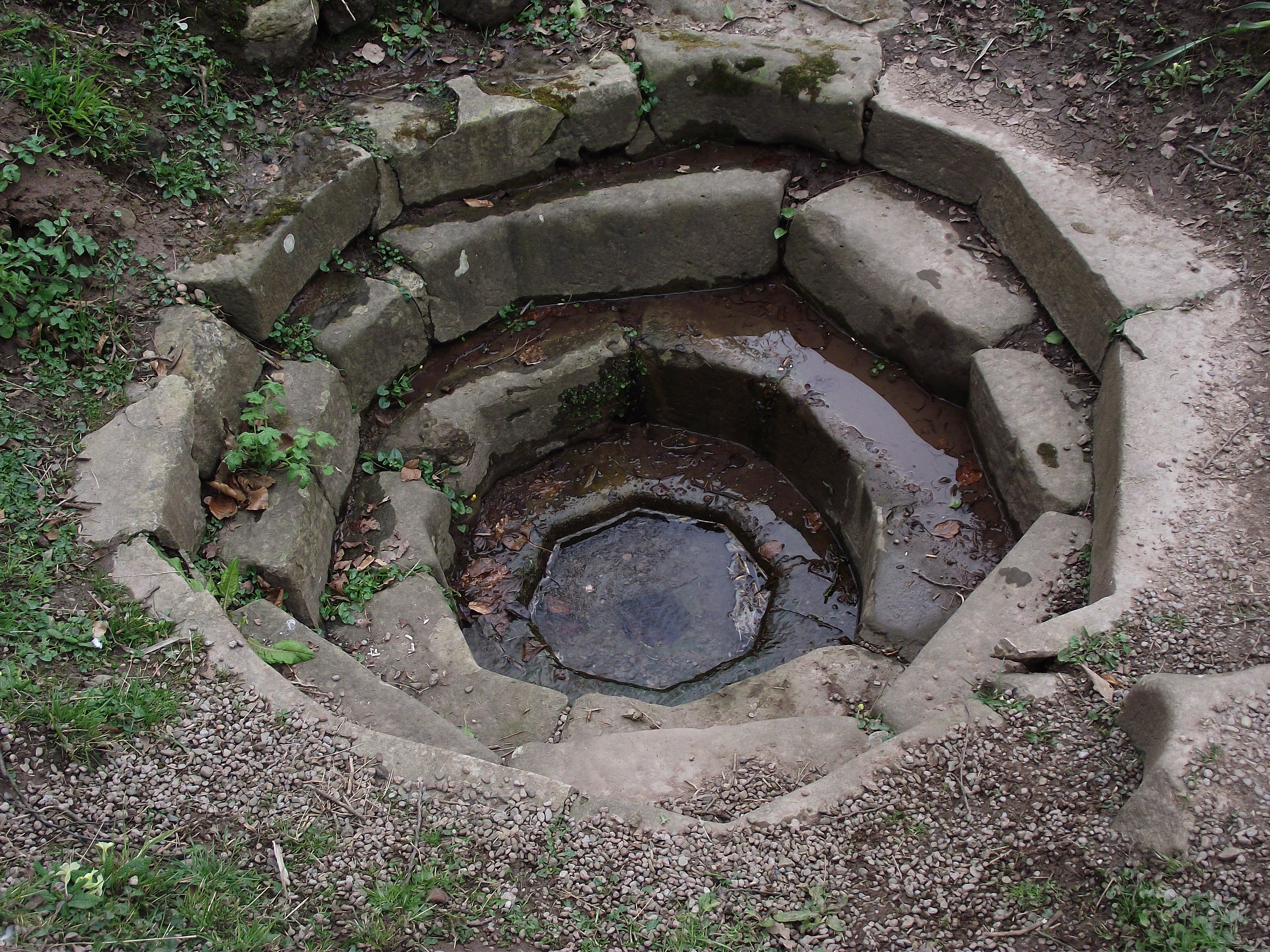
A picture of the Roman cistern at The Weir Garden in Herefordshire

== Name ==
The Roman town is securely identified with the "Magnis" which appears both in the Antonine Itinerary and Ravenna Cosmography. The town is today sometimes referred to under the name "Magna". However, the town was not a colonia, nor a tribal capital, and Rivet and Smith derive the name from the Celtic word maen meaning 'stone' or 'rock'. The name may apply to the hills visible to the north of Kenchester.

== History ==
The ruins of a Roman private bath house or temple that was possibly associated with a high-status Roman villa, which may have connections to Magnis, lie inside the Weir Garden by the River Wye. There is an octagonal cistern filled by a spring, and a ruined buttress by the river. These are the highest standing Roman ruins in Herefordshire.

Earthen defences have been found dating from the 2nd century, with later stone defences being built by the 4th century and occupation likely to have continued into the 5th century.

Sometime after the Battle of Deorham in 577 the town had become the base of the Mercian subkingdom of the Magonsaete ("Magon-dwellers").
