= Kenchester =

Civil parish in Herefordshire, England

Coordinates: 52.08132°N 2.821936°W

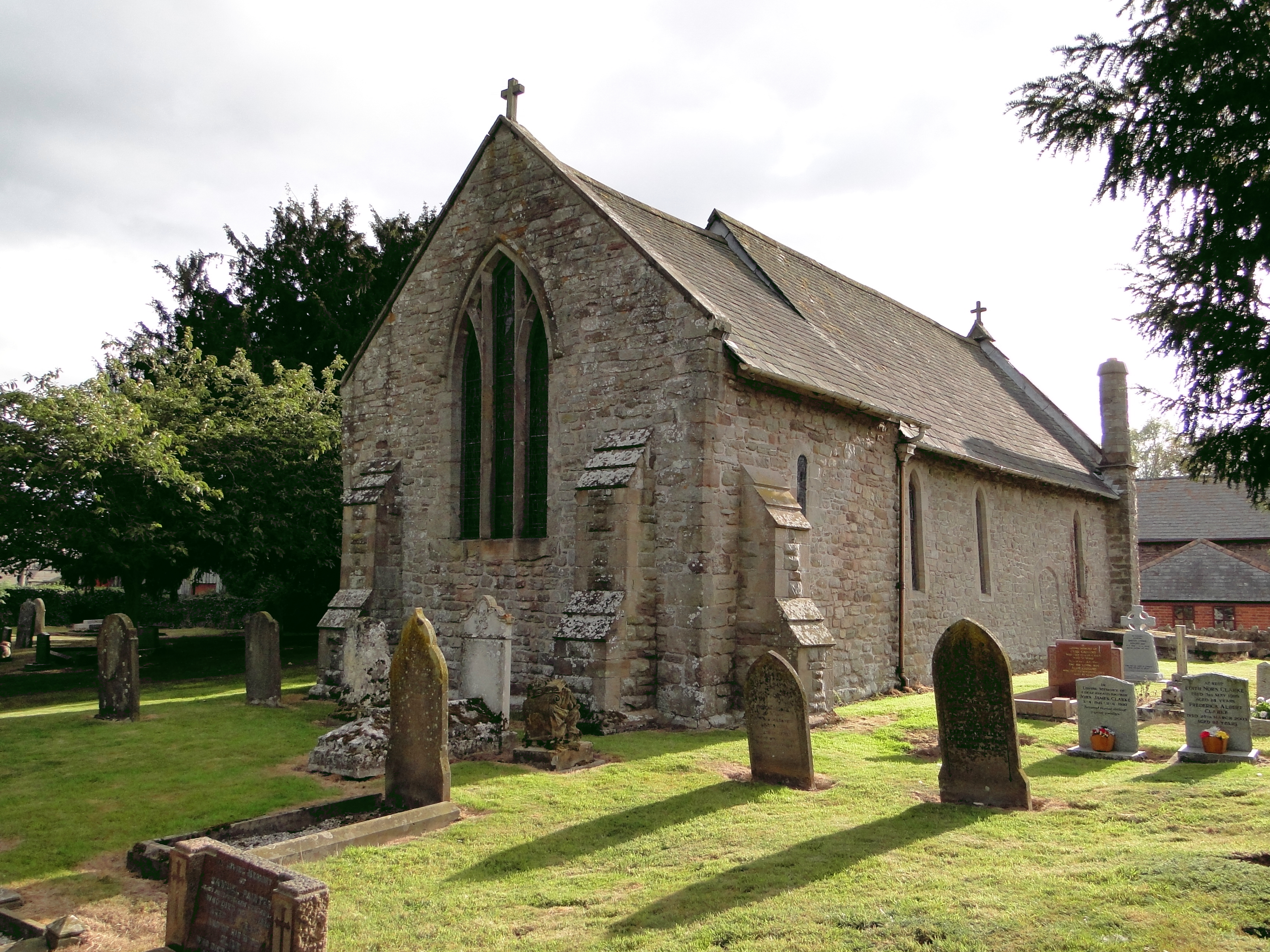
- Church of St Michael, Kenchester

- Location within Herefordshire
- Unitary authority: Herefordshire
- Ceremonial county: Herefordshire
- Region: West Midlands
- Country: England
- Sovereign state: United Kingdom
- Post town: HEREFORD
- Postcode district: HR4
- Police: West Mercia
- Fire: Hereford and Worcester
- Ambulance: West Midlands
- UK Parliament: North Herefordshire

Kenchester is a parish in Herefordshire, England. It is about 5.5 miles (9 km) west-northwest of Hereford.

Kenchester is near the Romano-British town of Magnis, and was once part of the Angles' Magonsæte kingdom.

The Church of St Michael is a Grade I listed building.
