= Madley =

Village in Herefordshire, England

Coordinates: 52.044°N 2.849°W

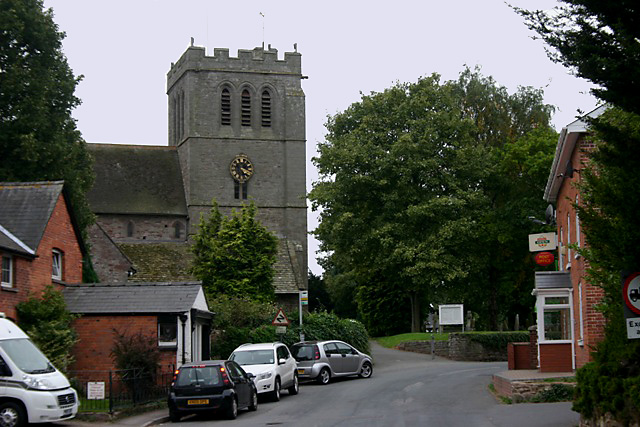
- Post office and church

- Location within Herefordshire
- Population: 1,200 (2011 Census)
- OS grid reference: SO419387
- Unitary authority: Herefordshire
- Shire county: Herefordshire
- Region: West Midlands
- Country: England
- Sovereign state: United Kingdom
- Post town: Hereford
- Postcode district: HR2
- Police: West Mercia
- Fire: Hereford and Worcester
- Ambulance: West Midlands
- UK Parliament: Hereford and South Herefordshire

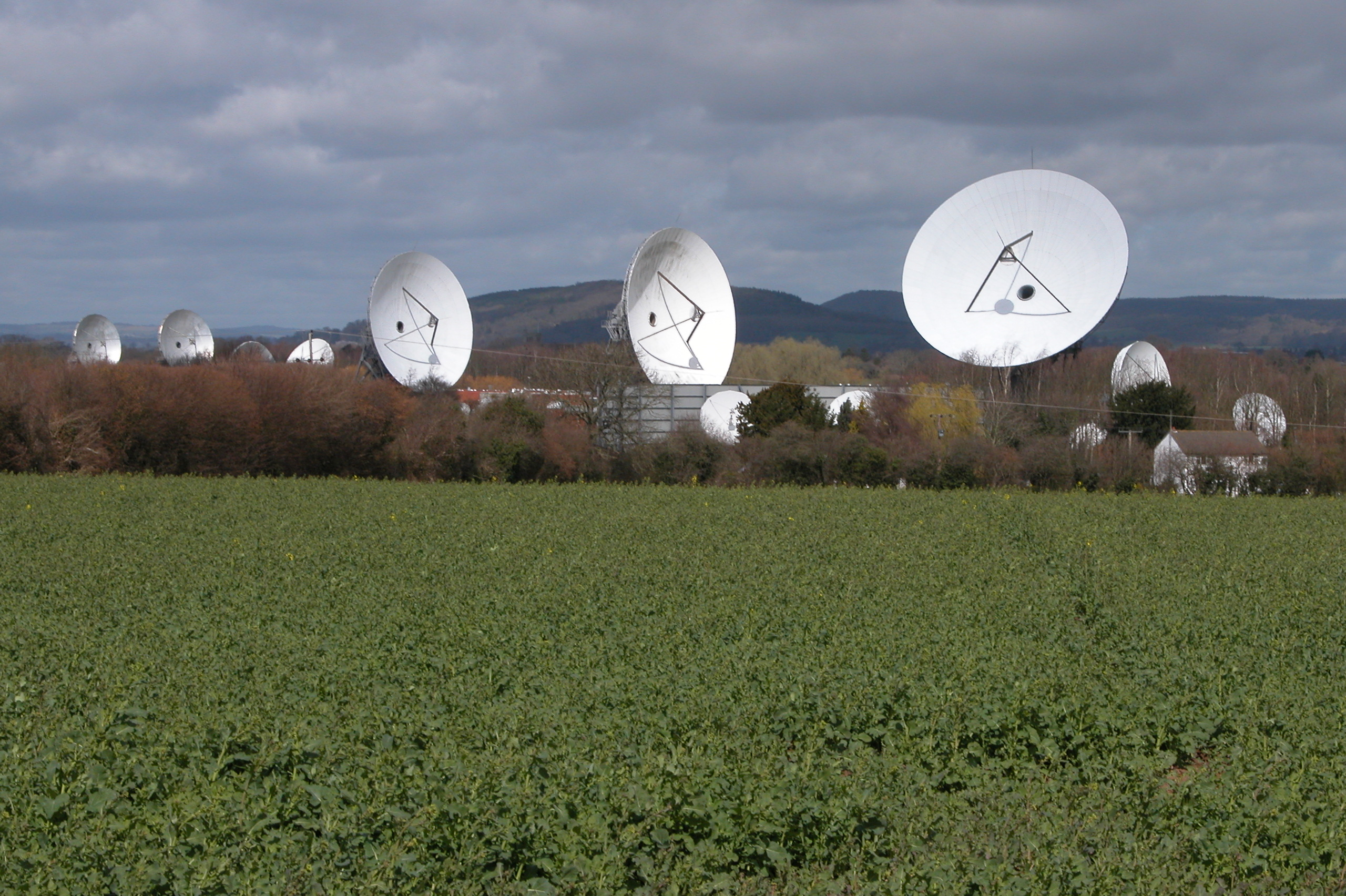
Madley Communications Centre earth satellite tracking station

Madley is a village and civil parish in the English county of Herefordshire. It is located six miles west of the city of Hereford. The population of the civil parish at the 2011 census was 1,200.

== Other settlements ==
The parish includes the hamlets of Canon Bridge, Wormhill, Winmoor, Lulham, Upper and Lower Chilstone, Upper and Lower Shenmore, Cublington, Great and Little Brampton, Webton and Webton Court. Madley is the second largest parish in the county of Herefordshire.

== Etymology ==
The name Madley most probably originated from Middle Welsh matle, equivalent to modern Welsh mad lle, meaning “good place”; but this was later reinterpreted by English speakers through folk etymology as Mada-ley, “meadow of Mada”, as the suffix -ley is common in English place names (e.g. Hadley, Shipley) as a shortened form of the word leigh (“meadow”).

== History and amenities ==
Madley is most famous as the birthplace of Saint Dubricius, the 6th century evangelist of South Wales. He was born at Chilstone which is named after the 'Child Stone' that marked the spot. The parish has a fine medieval Church of England parish church which replaced that founded by St Dubricius. The church of the Nativity of the Blessed Virgin Mary is one of the best known local examples of Norman architecture with gargoyles carved into the tower itself. It is a Grade I listed building.

The British Telecom's Madley Communications Centre is on part of the disused World War II airfield RAF Madley. It was built in 1940 by Welsh contractors and opened as a training centre for aircrew and ground wireless operators on 27 August 1941. In 1943 the grass airfield was reinforced with Sommerfeld Tracking and the centre's population rose to about 5,000. The site was visited in 1944 prior to D-Day by US General George S. Patton, and later by Rudolf Hess (who had been held prisoner near Abergavenny) on his way to the Nuremberg trials in 1946. Today only a few hangars remain. On 1 August 2019 a Piper Arrow single engined aeroplane registered G-DIZY suffered an engine failure and made an emergency landing on the grass south of the runway intersections. It was later dismantled and removed by road.

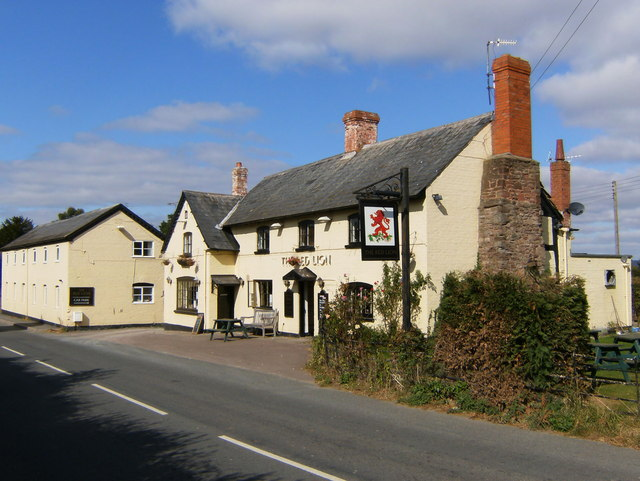
The Red Lion

The Red Lion in Madley is an old coaching inn dating back to the 16th century and is a grade II listed building. Here mail was delivered by mail coach from London and distributed to recipients in the locality. The pub itself is built on a well which is situated under the hallway by the pub cellar. A stream also runs under the rear car park and flows under the land of the Red Lion Garage.

=== Former amenities ===
The Red Lion Garage was built in the 1940s by Johnathan Edwards and was run as a successful family business until 1986 when it was taken over by Tim and Martin Edwards (now deceased c.2006) and redeveloped in 2003. The old traditional butchers' shop in Madley was run by Herbie and Audrey Cresswell in the 1960s. It was later owned by Gordon Watkins and is now demolished with a garage on the site.
