= Kingstone, Herefordshire =

Village in Herefordshire, England

Coordinates: 52.009°N 2.817°W

Kingstone
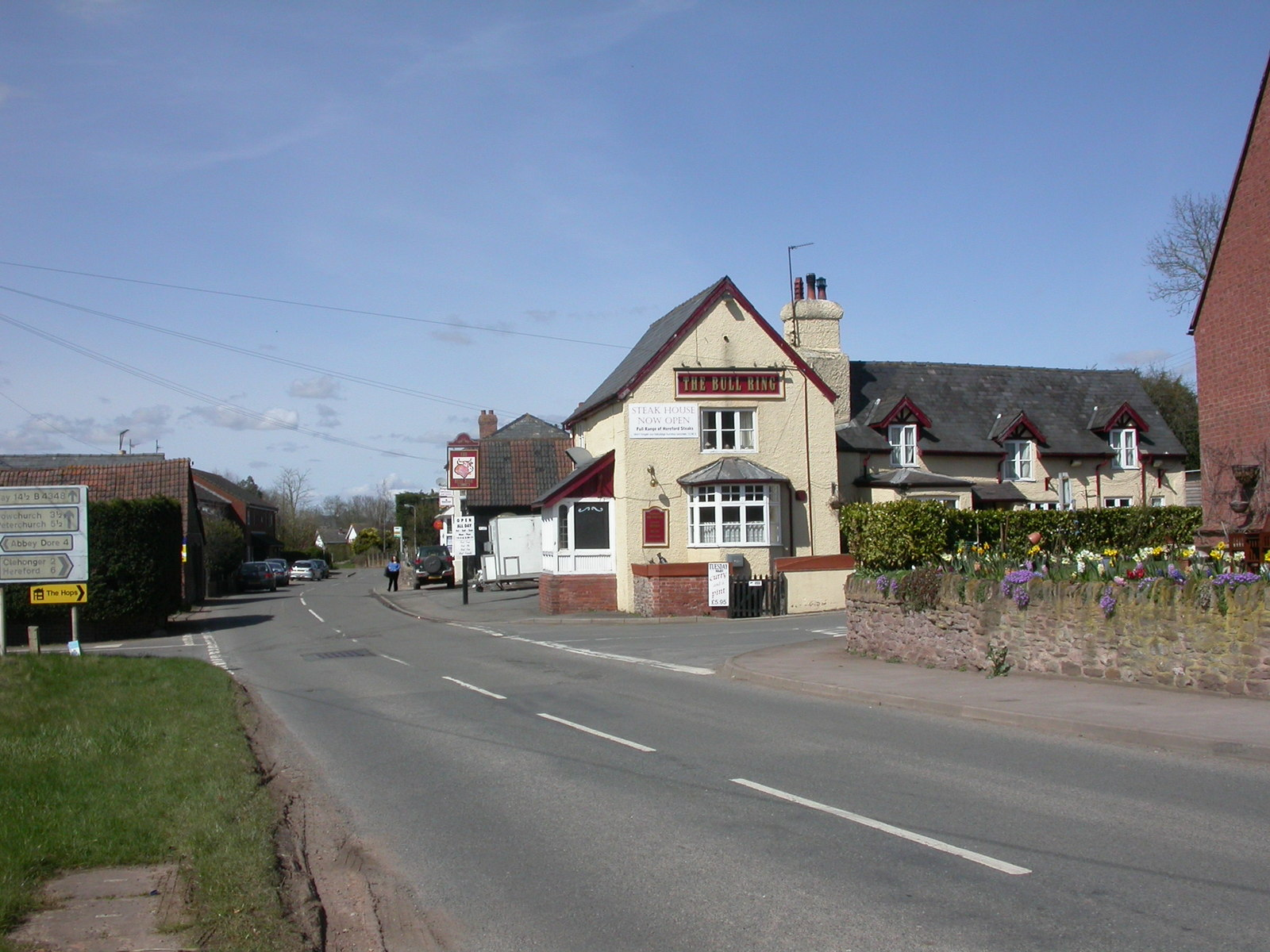
- Crossroads in Kingstone with pub and post office

- Location within Herefordshire
- Population: 1,373 (2011)
- OS grid reference: SO4235
- Unitary authority: Herefordshire
- Ceremonial county: Herefordshire
- Region: West Midlands
- Country: England
- Sovereign state: United Kingdom
- Post town: HEREFORD
- Postcode district: HR2
- Dialling code: 01981
- Police: West Mercia
- Fire: Hereford and Worcester
- Ambulance: West Midlands
- UK Parliament: Hereford & South Herefordshire

Kingstone is a civil parish and a large village in rural Herefordshire, England. It lies within the historic area of Archenfield, near the Welsh border, south-west of the city of Hereford. The parish church is dedicated to St. Michael and All Angels.

The village has both a primary school, which also serves nearby Thruxton, and a secondary school, Kingstone High School.
