= RAF Credenhill =

Former RAF station in Herefordshire, England

RAF Credenhill
- Near Credenhill, Herefordshire in England
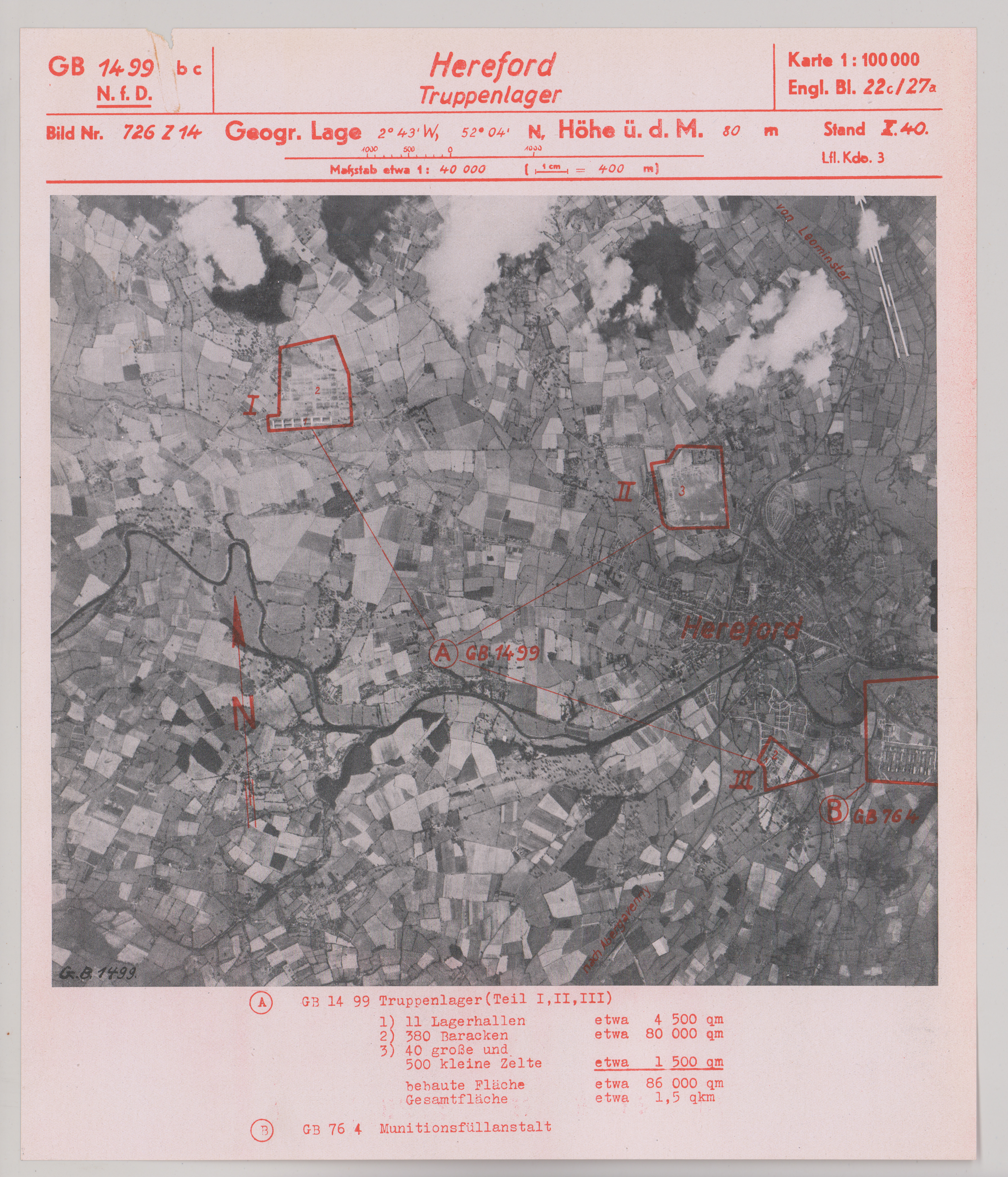
- RAF Hereford on a target dossier of the German Luftwaffe, 1940

Site information
- Type: Royal Air Force station
- Owner: Ministry of Defence
- Operator: Royal Air Force

Location
- Shown within Herefordshire
- Coordinates: 52°05′06″N 002°47′42″W

Site history
- Built: 1939
- In use: 15 June 1940 - 23 April 1994
- Battles/wars: Second World War

Airfield information
Helipads
Number	Length and surface
01	40 metres (131 ft) Asphalt

RAF Credenhill, also known as RAF Hereford, is a former non-flying Royal Air Force station situated in the village of Credenhill near Hereford, England, United Kingdom. It was commissioned in 1940 and served as home for a range of training schools from 1940 until closure in 1994. The site was subsequently obtained by the British Army.

== History ==
=== First World War ===
After the outbreak of the First World War, the Ministry of Munitions were required to create a number of Royal Ordnance Factory munitions production facilities quickly and cheaply. In 1912 Herefordshire County Council had bought 185 acres (75 ha) of the former Rotherwas estate from the Lubienski-Bodenham family, overlooked by Dinedor Hill and bordered by the Wye meadows.

A site of 100 hectares (250 acres) was acquired by the Ministry on 15 June 1916, at Lower Bullingham just south of Hereford on the junction of the Welsh Marches Line and the Hereford, Ross and Gloucester Railway. Laid out to a standard design, ROF Rotherwas encompassed:

- 27 miles (43 km) standard-gauge railway
- 3 miles (4.8 km) of roads
- 9 miles (14 km) of guard fence
- 10 miles (16 km) of footpaths and sentry paths
- 370 buildings varying in floor area; like a typical munitions facility, the buildings were widely spaced on safety reasons, to avoid complete destruction of the facility in case of an explosion

For storage purposes, the ROF also acquired railway-connected lands at Credenhill the Credenhill Railway Sidings.

All components were produced elsewhere, with the facility responsible for final production: inserting explosive into shells and fitting detonators. Shell filling began on 11 November 1916, with both Lyddite and Amatol explosives being used in production. From June 1918, supplied with dichloroethyl sulphide by the National Smelting Company at Avonmouth Docks, the facility produced mustard gas shells. By the end of WW1, the average output of shells from the facility was 70,000 per week.

=== Second World War ===
In 1939, the Credenhill Railway Sidings was requisitioned and shortly after the outbreak of the Second World War preparations and construction started with the station officially opening on 15 June 1940. A 112-bed hospital was established on 15 June 1940, opposite the main camp. The Commonwealth Training Programme was begun in 1942, and the station was used as an assembly point for officers and airmen about to proceed to Canada for training.

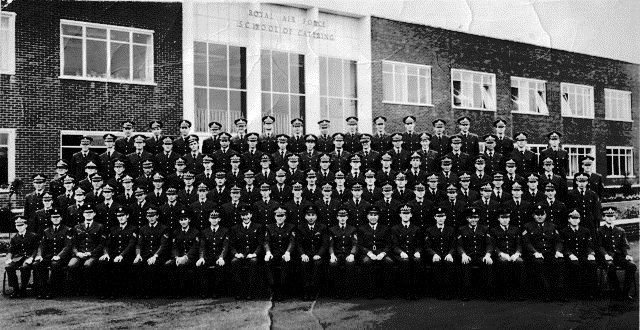
Graduation photograph of 2 Squadron RAF Admin Apprentices, RAF Hereford, August 1973; the final entry to graduate from No. 3 School of Technical Training

The following units were posted here:-

- No. 11 School of Technical Training from 15 June 1940 to 30 September 1945.
- School of Torpedo Maintenance from 1942 to 1946.
- No. 7 Mobile Parachute Servicing Unit from 17 April 1944 to February 1945.
- HQ, No. 24 Group from September 1944 to December 1944.
- No. 1 Air Crew Officers School from 1 November 1944 until 1 May 1946.
- No. 2 School of Administration and Accounting Training from 1944 to May 1948.
- No. 6 School of Recruit Training from 1950 to 1952
- No. 533 Squadron RAF Regiment from 1 July 1952 to ?
- Administrative Apprentice Training School from 1953 to 1959, 1962-63
- RAF School of Catering from September 1958 - ?
- No. 3 School of Technical Training from April 1959 until 17 May 1974.
- School of Basic Training for WRAF from 25 March 1974 to August 1982.
- Youth Training Squadron from September 1983 to 1994.

== Closure ==
On 23 April 1994 the station closed. The site was obtained by the British Army to redevelop for the Special Air Service headquarters base with the SAS subsequently moving there from Hereford in 1999. In 2000 the base was designated as Stirling Lines.
