= ROF Rotherwas =

Former ordnance factory in Herefordshire, England

Coordinates: 52.037926°N 2.690392°W

ROF Rotherwas was a Royal Ordnance Factory filling factory, No 4, located in Rotherwas, Dinedor Parish, Herefordshire, England.

== Background ==
In the early 20th century, the Lubienski-Bodenham family - descended from Mary Tudor, the daughter of King Henry VII - owned the Rotherwas estate, which included a mansion house, Rotherwas Court, and 2,500 acres (1,000 ha) of land on the south side of the River Wye. After the death of Count Louis Pomian Lubienski Bodenham in 1912, (Note: His great-grand daughter was actress Rula Lenska.) the family line ended. The Rotherwas estate was dismantled in 1913. Thirteen of the mansion's wood panelled rooms were sent to America (the Rotherwas Room survives at Amherst College) and the land was put up for sale. At the resultant auction, Herefordshire County Council bought 185 acres (75 ha) that was overlooked by Dinedor Hill and was bordered by the Wye meadows.

== World War I ==
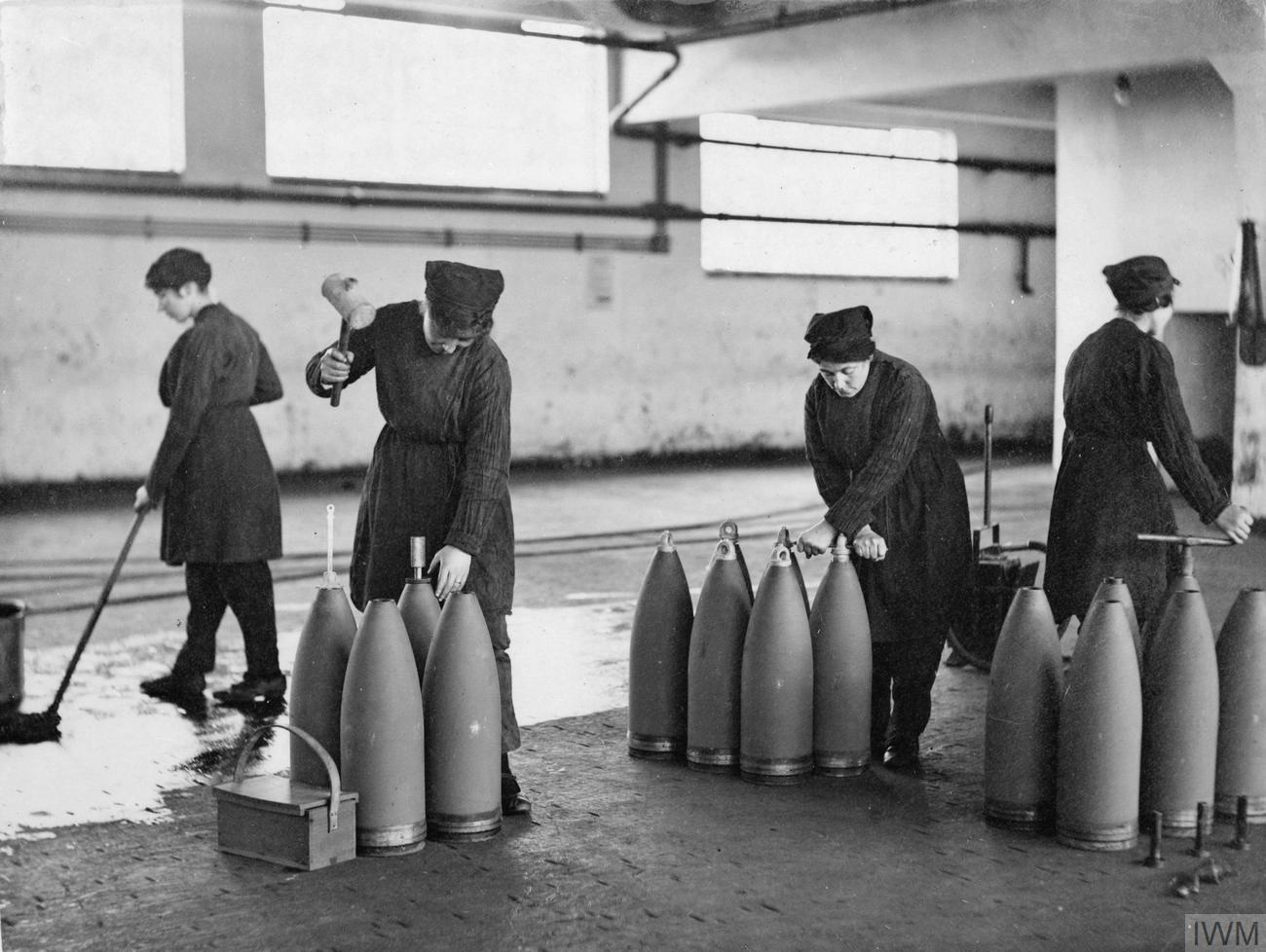
Workers at Rotherwas during WW1

At the outbreak of World War I, the Ministry of Munitions were looking to create a number of munitions production facilities quickly and cheaply. A site of 100 hectares (250 acres) was acquired by the Ministry on 15 June 1916, located south of Hereford on the junction of the Welsh Marches Line and the Hereford, Ross and Gloucester Railway. Laid out to a standard design, the site encompassed:

- 27 miles (43 km) standard-gauge railway
- 3 miles (4.8 km) of roads
- 9 miles (14 km) of guard fence
- 10 miles (16 km) of footpaths and sentry paths
- 370 buildings varying in floor area. Like a typical munitions facility, the buildings were widely spaced on safety reasons, to avoid complete destruction of the facility in case of an explosion
- A rail connected outpost was established at Credenhill as a munitions store. During WW2 this land was again requisitioned for defence and became RAF Hereford, once the home of the Special Air Service.

All components were produced elsewhere, with the facility responsible for final production: inserting explosive into shells, and fitting detonators. Shell filling began on 11 November 1916, with both Lyddite and Amatol explosives being used in production. From June 1918, alongside the main plant at Banbury and supporting site at Chittenden; all three were supplied with dichloroethyl sulphide by the National Smelting Company at Avonmouth Docks, to produce mustard gas shells. By the end of WW1, the average output of shells from the facility was 70,000 per week.

At peak of 6,000 employees; by October 1918, there were 5,943 employees, 3,977 of which were women. Workers were transported in from billets in Hereford, Leominster and Ross on Wye. Dedicated trains were run from Hereford Barrs Court railway station to the specially built factory station, with free tickets supplied to all employees.

== Between the wars ==
The only ROF of 25 sites retained between the wars, it was put into care and maintenance from 1920. From 1926 onwards it resumed filling gas shells, staffed by about 400 men. By the late 1930s it was used by the Royal Navy for filling sea mines.

== World War II ==
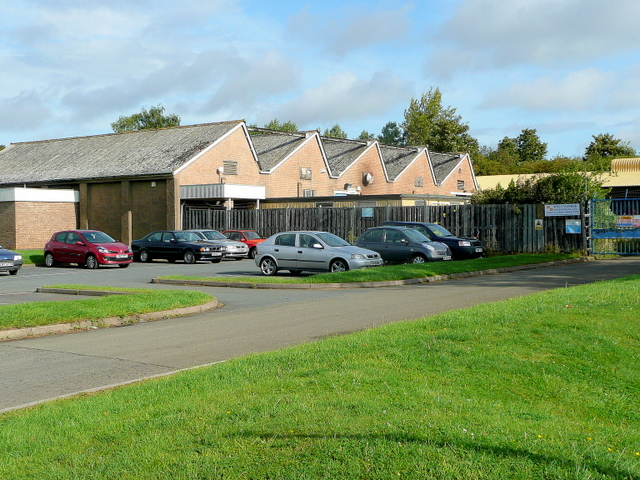
Former ROF Rotherwas distribution buildings from World War II, now used for commercial purposes just north of Netherwood Road. August 2009

During World War II, the facility was used to produce shells, and bombs for the Royal Air Force. The site employed over 8,000 staff, mainly women. The site suffered three major incidents:

- 12 September 1941: a milling machine overheated, creating explosions which killed three people
- 27 July 1942: a single Nazi Luftwaffe bomber dropped two 250 kg bombs, killing 22 people
- 30 May 1944: a 2,000 pounds (910 kg) bomb exploded during filling operations exploded (see below)

=== 1944 explosion ===
On 30 May 1944, a 2,000 pounds (910 kg) naval bomb being prepared at Rotherwas was seen smoking. Three workers - James Winter Little, Frederick J. Tyler and A Morris - started dousing the bomb with water. Six members of the factory fire brigade cooled the bomb down and 800 fellow workers were evacuated from the southern section of the factory. The bomb split open and exploded and Morris was killed. Assistant Fire Officer F. A. Lewis and Leading Fireman H. E. Davies were thrown 30 foot out of the building. A second explosion was more powerful and the building collapsed on the firefighters, killing firefighter St Vincent De Lisle Carey. A third worker, trained in first aid, was helping colleagues and was also killed. The Hereford fire brigade and British, Canadian and American servicemen from the Herefordshire bases helped to bring the fire under control. In total, 31 2000lb bombs and mines exploded.

The explosions damaged homes and businesses across the city. Nine hundred tons of live ammunition lay under the rubble and it took a month for a specialist team to make the site safe. WL Fitzmaurice defused 1500 pounds of explosives on his own to protect his colleagues whilst being continuously soaked by hosepipe.

King George V awarded five George Medals, nine British Empire Medals, an OBE and an MBE and 34 other commendations to workers for their bravery.

Miss Mona Cawthorne was in the Mechanised Transport Corps at ROF Rotherwas. She was presented with a letter of commendation from the Director General CS Robinson for her bravery in transporting the injured to hospital despite being injured herself.

In 2003, volunteers from the Hereford Waterworks Museum found a Blackstone 5-cylinder diesel engine, multi belt drive system and a Mather & Platt two stage centrifugal pump at Rotherwas. The fire engine has been fully restored and is part of a special exhibition in the Rotherwas Building at the Waterworks Museum.

Ruskin Spear recalled the explosion in a painting called A Royal Ordnance Factory Explosion, Hereford depicting damage to the site and demolished buildings. The painting is now part of the Imperial War Museum collection.

== Present ==
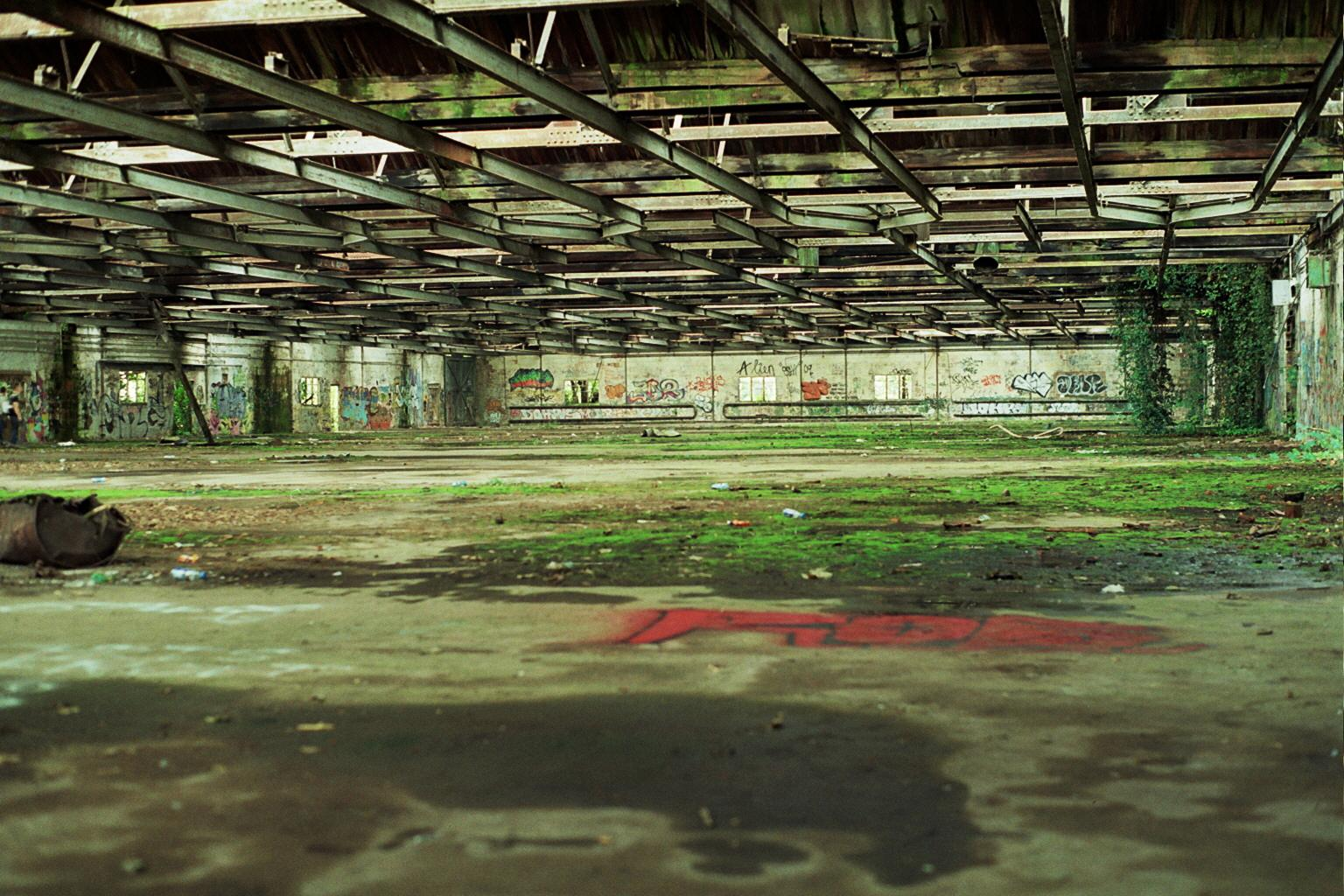
One of the now derelict distribution buildings. Note the overhead rails for carrying munitions.

With vastly reduced production after World War II, the city and county council lobbied for various business to relocate to the site. As the ROF was reduced in scale, parts of the site were redeveloped with various commercial industrial facilities.

The ROF closed in 1967. In 1975 Herefordshire County Council bought 93 hectares (230 acres) for redevelopment as an industrial estate. A number of World War I buildings survive, as does a group of World War II Romney huts to the north-east, now used as industrial starter units.

In September 2020, the newly refurbished Shell Store building opened at Rotherwas. A £7.3 million project built a new shell around the existing steel frame from 1916. It has room for up to 25 businesses, conference space and a cafe. Part of the original floor showing the imprints made by shells can be seen.
