= David Ord =

British businessman (born 1948)

Sir David Charles Ord (born July 1948) is a British businessman.

== Early life and education ==
Ord graduated from University College London and was a Sloan Fellow of the London Business School.

== Career ==
He is the co-owner and Co-Chairman of the Bristol Port Company, which owns Royal Portbury Dock and Avonmouth Docks which make up the modern Port of Bristol. The docks were operated by the Port of Bristol Authority, part of Bristol City Council, until 1991, when the council granted a 150-year lease to the Bristol Port Company. In 2014 the council sold the freehold of the port to the company for £10 million, but retained a 12.5% non voting stake in the company.

He was non-executive chairman of Mitie from 2003 to 2008 and was the south west regional treasurer of the Conservative Party from 1999. He is a member of the Society of Merchant Venturers. He made donations to the local Conservative party, which led to member of parliament Charlotte Leslie, being accused of not declaring these as being potentially relevant to her opposition to the Severn Barrage. She was later cleared of wrongdoing in relation to the declaration of the donations.

His larger donations, estimated to be £77,500 in 2013, to the national conservative party led to speculation about his influence in connection with plans for the barrage. He is a director of Open Europe, a think tank promoting ideas for economic and political reform of the European Union. He is chairman of the Trade Policy Research Centre.

Since 1998, Ord has been a member of The Society of Merchant Venturers, a private club whose membership is invited "from individuals who have been successful in their chosen area of business".

Ord is a Director of First Corporate Consultants, Limited. He donated £100,000 to Reform UK on December 11, 2023.

== Controversies ==
Prior to his knighthood in the 2017 New Year Honours, David Ord has donated more than £930,000 to the Conservative Party since 2013. Jeremy Corbyn has said “The Conservatives are making a mockery of our honours system. Every crony appointment is an insult to the incredible people from right across Britain who are rewarded for the great contributions they make to our national life.” A Downing Street source has defended the honours for Conservative donors, saying: “Being involved in political parties is generally considered to be an important part of civic society, and the alternative is having state funding for political parties, which is not where the consensus lies. When people dedicate their time and service to civil society it’s appropriate they can be honoured.”
