= Chittening =

Industrial estate in Bristol, England

Coordinates: 51.529°N 2.675°W

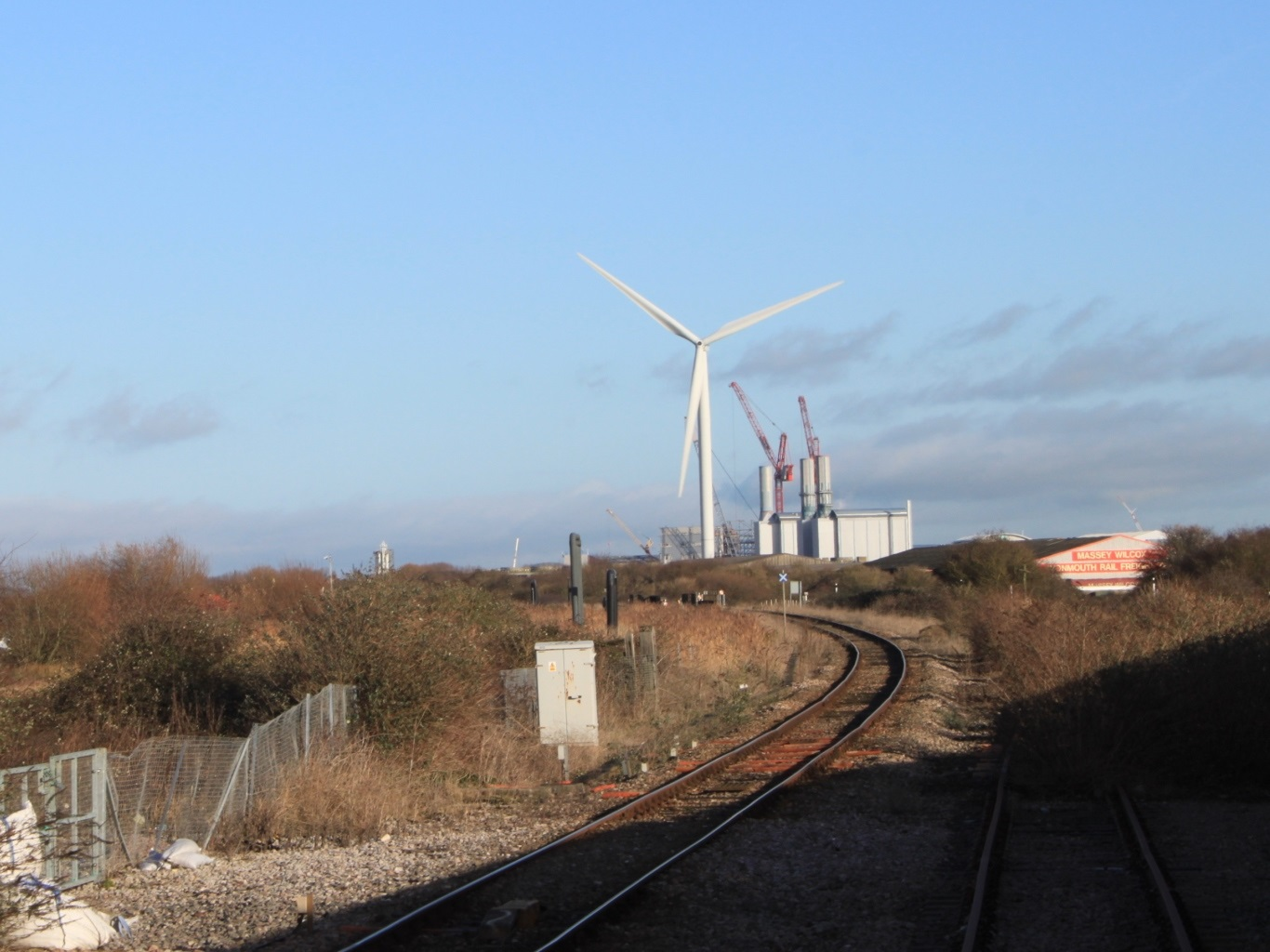

- Location within Bristol
- OS grid reference: ST532813
- Unitary authority: Bristol
- Region: South West
- Country: England
- Sovereign state: United Kingdom
- Post town: BRISTOL
- Postcode district: BS11
- Dialling code: 0117
- Police: Avon and Somerset
- Fire: Avon
- Ambulance: South Western
- UK Parliament: Bristol North West

Chittening is an industrial estate in Avonmouth, Bristol, England, bypassed by the A403 road, near the River Severn. It lies within the city boundary of Bristol, in Avonmouth ward, but used to be beyond it, in historic Gloucestershire, on former marshland at the southern end of the Vale of Berkeley.

== History ==
=== Name and early history ===
Chittening was once a farm, first recorded in 1658 and 1702 as Chitnend. The name is from chitten end(e), from Middle English or Early Modern English chitte 'young of an animal; brat, child' + end(e) 'end [of a parish or estate]'. Chittening was in the ancient parish of Henbury in Gloucestershire. It was added to Bristol in the early 20th century.

There was a medieval Chapel on the site which stood until 1918. It had been in domestic use since 1845.

=== No. 23 Filling Factory ===
During World War I, the Ministry of Munitions built a filling factory for artillery shells on the site, which was farmland commandeered by the military for its closeness to Avonmouth docks and to the site of the National Spelter Company's chemical works (Spelter being zinc or a zinc alloy) in St Andrew's Road, Avonmouth, later the National Smelting Company. At Chittening, Nobel Explosives filled shells with chloropicrin, derived industrially from picric acid. In defiance of the Hague Convention on weapons, the German army used mustard gas (dichloroethyl sulphide) against Allied troops on the Eastern and Western Fronts in 1917, and the British minister of munitions, Winston Churchill, ordered supplies to be manufactured in Britain for use in retaliation. Having first used captured German gas in late 1917, and then gas produced at factories in Manchester and Runcorn, from June 1918 three filling factories, at Banbury, ROF Rotherwas at Hereford, and Chittening, were supplied with freshly manufactured mustard gas by the National Smelting Company. By November 1918, with unskilled female labour, Chittening had produced 85,424 mustard gas shells, but at a human cost of 1213 notified cases of associated illness, including at least two deaths which were later attributed to influenza. The story of the women who filled the shells at such great personal risk has been told in the stage play Gas Girls. Rather late in the day, a small hospital and surgery were opened on the site around the time of the Armistice.

=== Surviving relics of the mustard gas operation ===
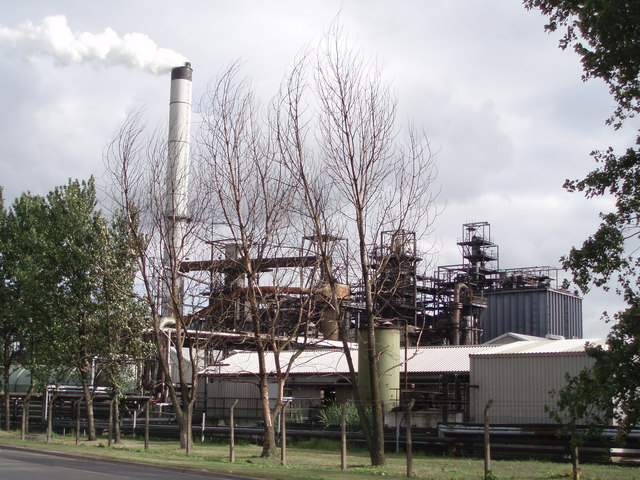
Sevalco Ltd, Severn Road, Chittening

One building survives from the World War I factory: the headquarters of Brandon Lifting at 7 Worthy Road. There is also the shell of a despatch shed, and the stub of a railway line that once entered the works complex. The original internal railway system of the smelting works (separate from the filling factory) was operated by two-foot gauge four-wheel battery-driven locomotives built for the Ministry of Munitions by the forerunner of Brush Traction of Loughborough. Two of them, maker's numbers 16302 and 16307, still exist. At the end of the war three, including these two, were acquired by the General Estates Company Ltd as surplus to wartime requirements and then sold in 1922 to the Hythe Pier Railway in Hampshire, where they were converted from battery-driven operation to a third-rail electric system operating at 250 volts.

=== Since the First World War ===
The present industrial estate (or "trading estate") developed mainly after World War II, under the management of the Port of Bristol Authority. In 1951 a factory producing carbon black was built to the north-east of the estate (Philblack, later Sevalco), and operated until 2008 when its closure was announced. The site has since been cleared with the exception of three storage tanks.

=== Internal structure of the trading estate ===
The estate is now organised around a structure of named roads: the spine, Worthy Road, and the peripheral Greensplott Road and Bank Road, all named after farms whose land disappeared under the industrial development.

=== Current businesses ===
A selection of the current businesses operating from the site can be viewed online. They include specialists in transport and logistics, plant and vehicle hire, lifting gear, pallet distribution, sectional buildings, industrial cleaning, damp control and vehicle repairs.

=== Rail links ===
Between 1917 and 1964, the Chittening site was served by Chittening Platform railway station on the Henbury Loop connecting Avonmouth with Filton Junction. It is now served by St Andrews Road railway station in Avonmouth Docks, a mile and a half or so to the south. The closure of the earlier platform was immortalised in the song "Slow Train" on an album released in 1964 by Flanders and Swann.

== Chittening Warth ==
Chittening Warth is an area of salt marsh beside the Severn Estuary, just beyond the sea-bank to the west of the industrial estate; warth is a local word for land periodically overflowed by the tide. At low tide the mudflats there are visited by large numbers of birds, including dunlin, Eurasian curlew, Eurasian oystercatcher, common redshank and whimbrel. In some winters there are large populations of field voles, which attract short-eared owls. A catalogue of sightings is maintained by the Severnside 200 Club.
