= Gottwald =

Gottwald is a German surname. Notable people with the surname include:

- Clytus Gottwald (1925–2023), German composer, conductor and musicologist
- Felix Gottwald (born 1976), Austrian Nordic combined athlete who competed from 1994 to 2007
- Frederick Gottwald (1858–1941), traditionalist American painter, influential in the development of the Cleveland School of art
- George Joseph Gottwald (1914–2002), American Catholic bishop
- Jeremiah Gottwald, fictional character in the Sunrise anime series, Code Geass: Lelouch of the Rebellion
- Klement Gottwald (1896–1953), Czechoslovak Communist politician, prime minister and president of Czechoslovakia
- Lukasz Sebastian Gottwald (born 1973), known as Dr. Luke, American record producer and songwriter
- Marlene Gottwald (born 1985), German politician
- Michal Gottwald (born 1981), Slovak football forward who plays for FK Dukla Banská Bystrica in the Slovak Superliga
- Norman K. Gottwald (1926–2022), American biblical scholar and political activist
- Peter Gottwald Jr., Paralympian athlete from America competing mainly in category T13 middle-distance events
- Siegfried Gottwald (1943–2015), German mathematician, logician and historian of science

== See also ==
- Gottwald Center for the Sciences, on the campus of the University of Richmond
- Order of Klement Gottwald, established by the Czechoslovak government in February 1953
- List of places named after Klement Gottwald
