= Dinedor =

Village in Herefordshire, England

Coordinates: 52.027°N 2.681°W

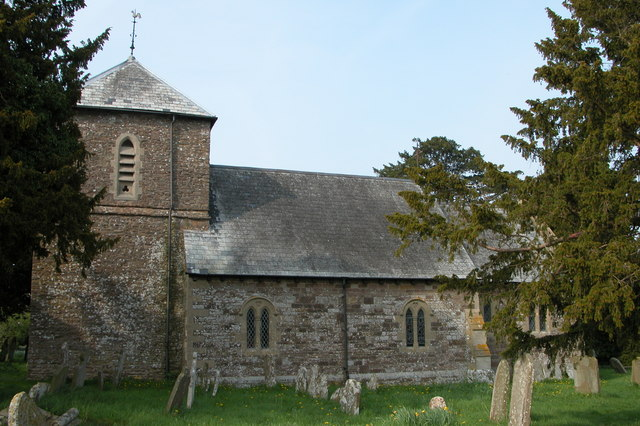
- Church of St Andrew, Dinedor

- Location within Herefordshire
- Population: 328 (2011)
- OS grid reference: SO510363
- Civil parish: Dinedor
- District: Herefordshire
- Shire county: Herefordshire
- Region: West Midlands
- Country: England
- Sovereign state: United Kingdom
- Post town: Hereford
- Postcode district: HR2
- Police: West Mercia
- Fire: Hereford and Worcester
- Ambulance: West Midlands
- UK Parliament: Hereford and South Herefordshire

Dinedor is a hill, village and civil parish in Herefordshire, England. Dinedor is situated 5 km (3.1 mi) south east of Hereford. The hilltop is the site of Dinedor Camp, an Iron Age fort.

The name Dinedor is possibly of Celtic origin meaning hill with a fort.

Dinedor is a scattered Herefordshire village, lying around 3 km south east of the county town of Hereford. It contains around 135 residential properties housing up to 200 individuals. The village is dominated by Dinedor Hill, site of Dinedor Camp, which lies at the south end of Dinedor Ridge.

There are two main centres of occupation, one clustered around the Church of St Andrew’s and the other on the slopes of Dinedor Camp.

Up until 1912 the vast majority of the land was owned by Rotherwas Estate, traditional home of the Bodenham family, this covered around two and a half thousand acres. This was put up for auction in 1912 and included in the sale were 15 farms, 19 small holdings, 25 cottages plus a blacksmiths shop together with shooting and fishing rights.

The church of St Andrew is thought to date from the 13th century. It was almost entirely rebuilt in 1867–8 by FR Kempson, except for pyramid-roofed west tower which is believed to be an original part. It has been a Grade II listed building since 1987. The ecclesiastical form of spelling the name of the parish has always been Dyndor.
