= Dinedor Camp =

Contour fort in Dinedor, Herefordshire, England

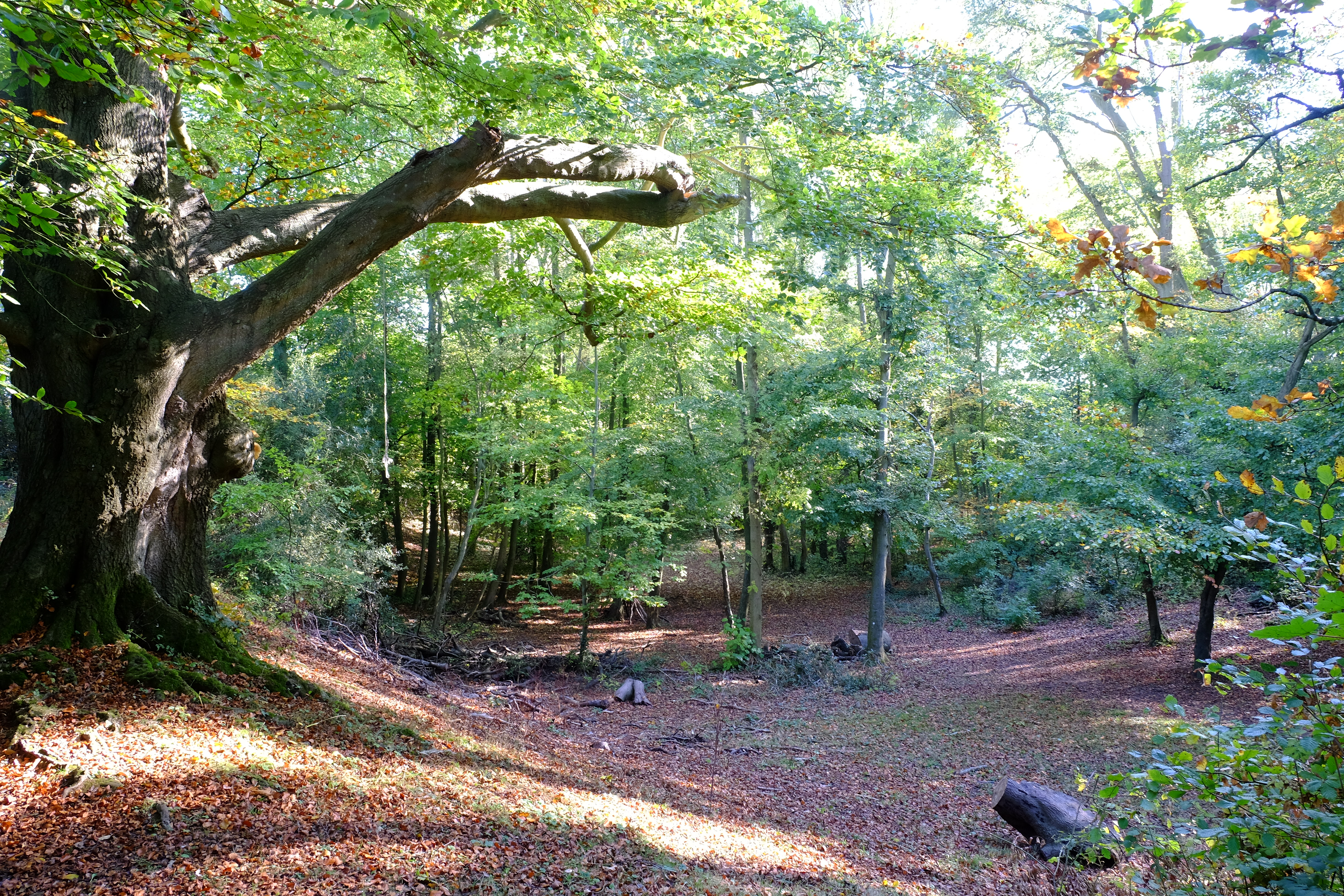
- Rampart of the fort

- Location within Herefordshire
- 52.0235°N 2.6963°W
- Type: Hillfort
- Periods: Iron Age
- Location: Near Hereford, Herefordshire
- OS grid reference: SO 523 363

Site notes
- Length: 337 metres (1,106 ft)
- Width: 160 metres (520 ft)
- Area: 3.8 hectares (9.4 acres)

Dinedor Camp is an Iron Age hillfort, about 1 kilometre (0.6 mi) west of the village of Dinedor and about 3 kilometres (1.9 mi) south of Hereford in England. It is a scheduled monument.

In 2016, Dinedor Camp was acquired by Dinedor Parish Council, as a community asset transfer from Herefordshire Council.

== Description ==
The fort is on a spur of Dinedor Hill; it overlooks to the east the River Wye at the confluence with the River Lugg.

It is about 337 metres (1,106 ft) long and 160 metres (520 ft) wide, enclosing an area of about 3.8 hectares (9.4 acres). There is an out-turned entrance at the east. There is a steep natural slope on the south side, and a single rampart, about 3 metres (9.8 ft) high, around the rest of the fort, rising to about 8 metres (26 ft) in the north-east.

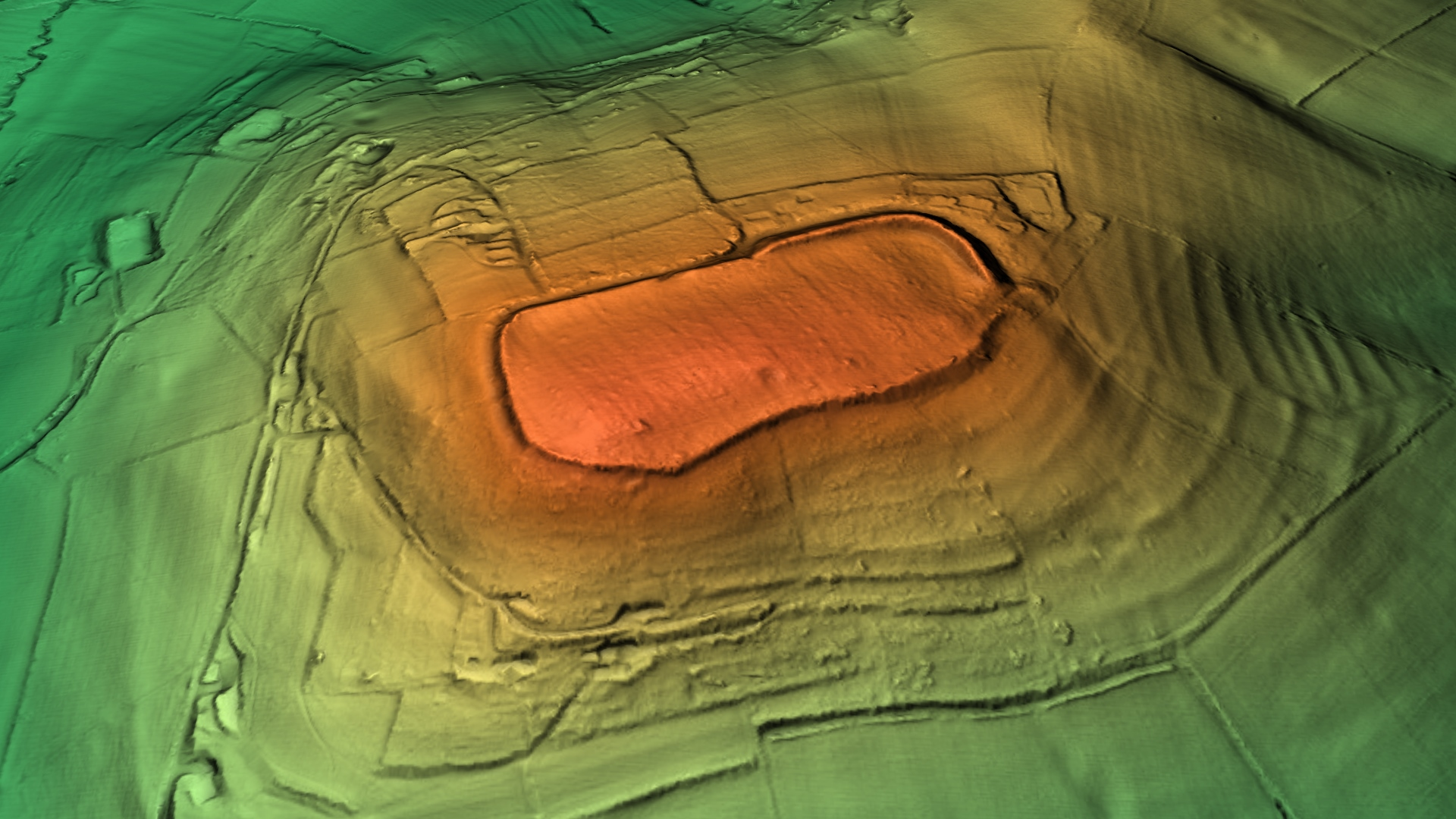
3D view of the digital terrain model

There was some excavation in 1951 at the north-east of the fort, a trench being cut from the edge of the rampart for about 35 metres (115 ft) towards the centre of the camp. Sherds of Iron Age and Roman pottery, part of an iron axehead and other iron fragments were found.

== See also ==
- Hillforts in Britain
