= Port of Bristol =

Port in England, UK

Coordinates: 51.50329°N 2.71621°W

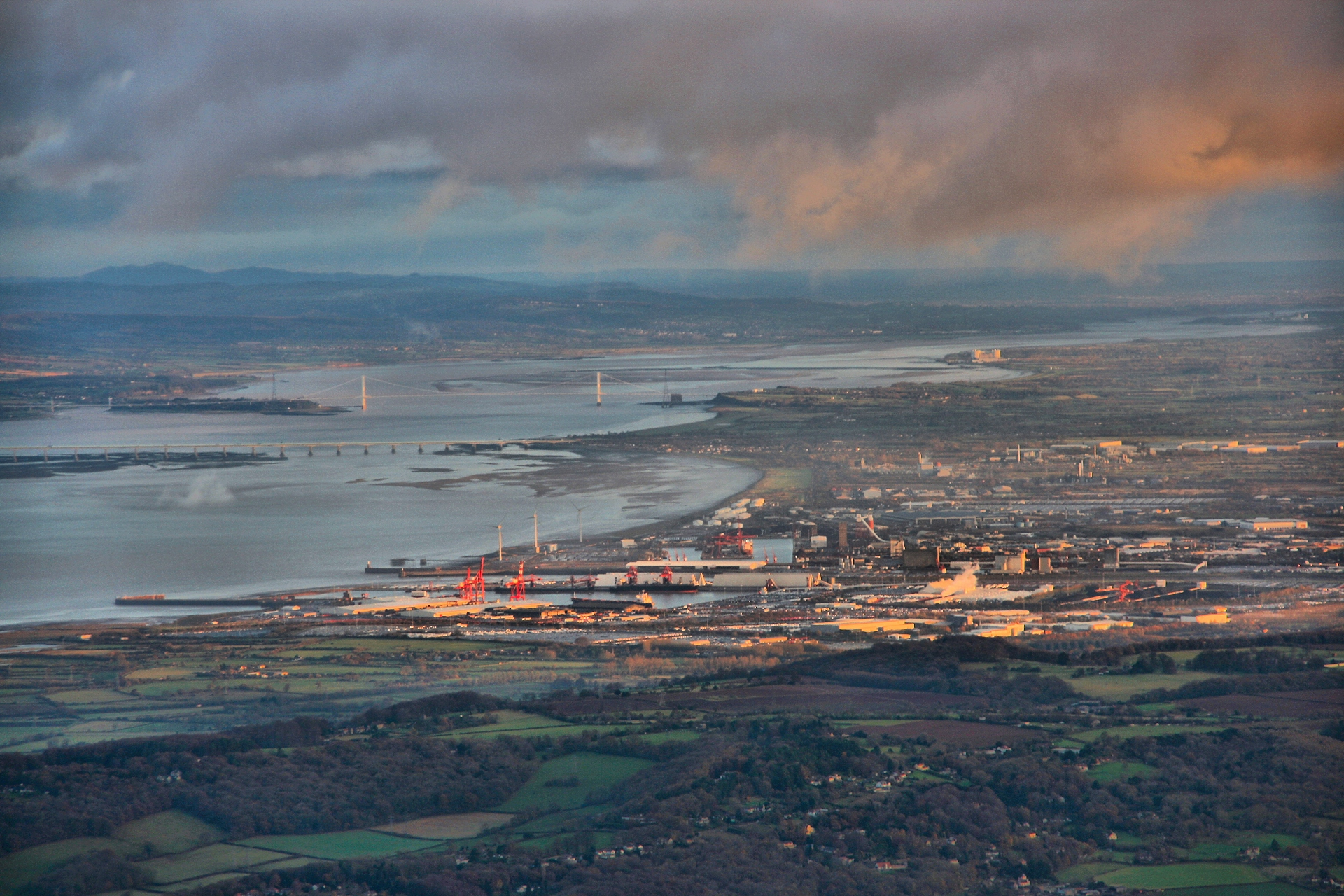
Aerial view of Port of Bristol

The Port of Bristol comprises the commercial, and former commercial, docks situated in and near the city of Bristol in England. The Port of Bristol Authority was the commercial title of the Bristol City, Avonmouth, Portishead and Royal Portbury Docks when they were operated by Bristol City Council, which ceased trade when the Avonmouth and Royal Portbury Docks were leased to The Bristol Port Company in 1991.

== History ==
The Port of Bristol grew up on the banks of the Rivers Avon and Frome, at their confluence upstream of the Avon Gorge which connects the city with the Severn Estuary and Bristol Channel. This part of the port was known as the Bristol City Docks, and is now more usually known as Bristol Harbour. The Avon and Frome are small, shallow rivers incapable in themselves of accommodating ocean-going ships, even those of the age of sail, as can still be seen by inspecting the branch of the Avon known as the New Cut at low tide. The harbour depended on the extreme tides (14 m, 46 ft) experienced in the Bristol Channel. Ships that wished to enter the harbour waited for the tide to begin to rise and floated up the river, through the Avon Gorge, and into the harbour on the tide. Ships leaving the harbour set out at the high tide, and floated down to the sea with the ebbing tide. In the 1800s the harbour was enclosed by locks, together with a diversion of the River Avon, resulting in its alternative name of the Floating Harbour, the Float, taken from the fact that the ships were able to float at all times, rather than resting in the mud at low tide, as had previously been the case.

Shipping Masters appointed under the Merchant Shipping Act included Henry Hellier Peters.

Bristol Dock Act 1884
- Act of Parliament
- Parliament of the United Kingdom
- Long title: An Act to enable the Mayor Aldermen and Burgesses of the City of Bristol to purchase the Undertakings of the Bristol Port and Channel Dock Company the Bristol Port and Channel Dock Warehouse Company Limited and the Portishead Warehouse Company Limited and the Dock Undertaking of the Bristol and Portishead Pier and Railway Company and for other purposes.
- Citation: 47 & 48 Vict. c. cclv

Dates
- Royal assent: 14 August 1884

Text of statute as originally enacted

The navigation of the Avon Gorge always presented a challenge, and became more and more difficult as ships got larger. In 1877, Avonmouth Old Dock, the first of the Avonmouth Docks, was opened, and in 1884 the Bristol Corporation acquired both the Avonmouth and Portishead Docks by the Bristol Dock Act 1884 (47 & 48 Vict. c. cclv). In 1908 the Royal Edward Dock was built at Avonmouth to the north of the mouth of the River Avon and with direct access to the Severn estuary and Bristol Channel.

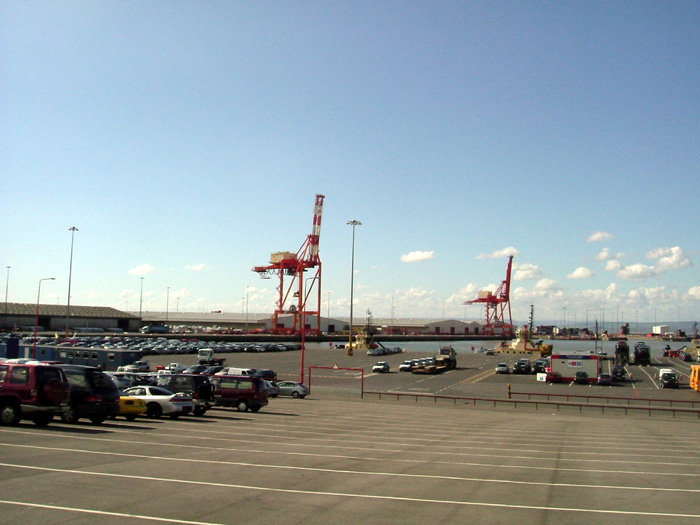
The Royal Portbury Dock

In 1972, the large deep water Royal Portbury Dock, across the river mouth from the Royal Edward Dock was constructed, again with direct access to the Bristol Channel.

These developments rendered the old Bristol City Docks in the Floating Harbour redundant as a commercial dock, and they have since been redeveloped as the centrepiece of many leisure, residential and retail developments in and around Bristol city centre. A sand company was the last to use the docks commercially in 1991.

The closure of the power stations at Portishead also made the Portishead Dock redundant, and it was finally closed in 1992.

In 1991, Bristol City Council sold a 150-year lease of the Avonmouth and Royal Portbury Docks to First Corporate Shipping Ltd, a private company owned by Terence Mordaunt and David Ord. The business trades as The Bristol Port Company (BPC). Since then over £600 million has been invested in the docks and the annual tonnage throughput has increased from 4 million tonnes to 14 million tonnes.

Up to 2014, the company made several applications to buy the site's freehold but these were rejected. Following a referendum in 2012, the city voters created the role of Mayor, subsequently electing George Ferguson. In March 2015 he and his cabinet decided to sell the freehold for £10 million but retain a 12.5% non-voting stake in the company. The city's council members voted on 2 June to object to the decision on the grounds of poor value for money, and referred it back to the mayor. Two weeks later the Mayor's cabinet resolved to sell the freehold. Following criticism by the editor of Money Week magazine, George Ferguson told the Financial Times the deal was exceptional value for the city.

First Corporate Shipping donated £25,000 to both Boris Johnson and Jeremy Hunt during the 2019 Conservative party leadership contest.

== Freeport ==
The Port of Bristol is one of the six sites Boris Johnson proposed for a Freeport, saying they were an "excellent" way to boost investment in left-behind parts of the country. The Bristol Port Company welcomed the news, seeing it having the potential to boost investment opportunities in and around UK ports. However some port and trade experts predicted the main effect would be to divert activity into the port from the surrounding region rather than create new jobs.

== New container terminal ==
As of 2010, a new deepsea container terminal is planned in Avonmouth.

== Further reading on the history of the port ==
- Buchanan, R. A. (1971). Nineteenth Century Engineers in the Port of Bristol (Bristol Historical Association pamphlets, no. 26)
- Carus-Wilson, E. M., ed. (1937). The Overseas Trade of Bristol in the later Middle Ages (Bristol Record Society Publications, Vol. VII)
- Damer Powell, J. W. (1930). Bristol Privateers and Ships of War (Arrowsmith, Bristol)
- Elkin, Paul (2000). 'Old Docks - New Problems at the Port of Bristol 1945-1965' in M. J. Crossely Evans et al., Post-War Bristol 1945-1965: Twenty years that changed the city (Bristol Historical Association pamphlets, no. 100), pp. 25–48
- Farr, Grahame E., ed. (1950). Records of Bristol Ships, 1800-1838 (Vessels over 150 tons) (Bristol Record Society Publications, Vol. XV)
- Farr, Grahame (1963). The S.S. Great Western: The First Atlantic Liner (Bristol Historical Association pamphlets, no. 8)
- Farr, Grahame (1965). The Steamship Great Britain (Bristol Historical Association pamphlets, no. 11)
- Farr, Grahame E. (1971). Bristol Shipbuilding in the Nineteenth Century (Bristol Historical Association pamphlets, no. 27)
- Jones, Evan T., ed. (2011). ‘Survey of the Port of Bristol, 1565’ (University of Bristol)
- Large, David, ed. (1984). The Port of Bristol, 1848-1884 (Bristol Record Society publications, Vol. XXXVI)
- Macinnes, C. M. (1939). A Gateway of Empire (Arrowsmith, Bristol)
- McGrath, Patrick (1954). 'Merchant shipping in the seventeenth century: the evidence of the Bristol deposition books, part I', Mariner's Mirror, 40 (1954), 282-93
- Minchinton, W. E., ed. (1957). The Trade of Bristol in the Eighteenth Century (Bristol Record Society Publications, Vol. XX)
- Minchinton, Walter (1962). The Port of Bristol in the Eighteenth Century (Bristol Historical Association pamphlets, no. 5)
- Minchinton, W. E., ed. (1963). Politics and the Port of Bristol in the Eighteenth Century: the petitions of the Society of Merchant Venturers, 1698 - 1803 (Bristol Record Society publications, Vol. XXIII, Bristol)
- Neale, W. G. (1968). At the Port of Bristol: volume one, members and problems, 1848-1899 (Port of Bristol Authority, Bristol, 1968)
- Neale, W. G. (1970). At the Port of Bristol: volume two, the turn of the tide, 1900-1914 (Port of Bristol Authority, Bristol)
- Neale, W. G. (1976). The Tides of War and the Port of Bristol, 1914-1918 (Port of Bristol Authority, Bristol)
- Port of Bristol Authority (1955). The Port of Bristol Official Handbook 1955 (Bristol)
- Press, Jonathan (1976). The Merchant Seamen of Bristol, 1747-1789 (Bristol Historical Association pamphlets, no. 38), 23 pp.
- Reid, W. N. and Hicks, W. E., Leading Events in the History of the Port of Bristol (Bristol, 1877)
- Sherborne, J. W. (1965). The Port of Bristol in the Middle Ages (Bristol Historical Association pamphlets, no. 13)
- Vanes, Jean (1977). The Port of Bristol in the Sixteenth Century(Bristol Historical Association pamphlets, no. 39)

== Sources ==
- Bristol Port website. Retrieved 29 March 2005 at 15:08 BST.
