= Avonmouth Docks =

Port near Bristol, England

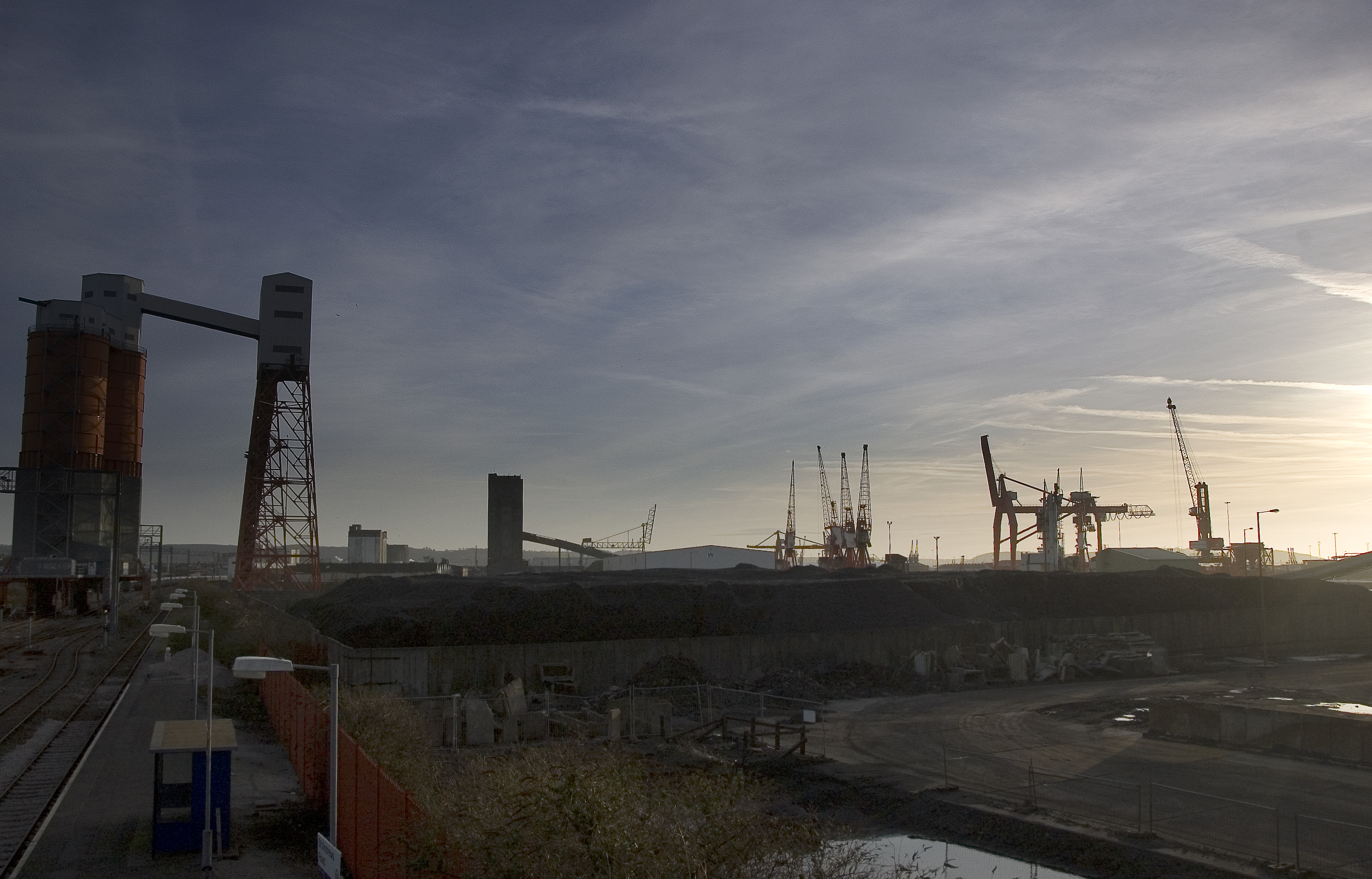
- The docks, as seen from St Andrews Road. The coal loading silos can be seen on the left, with the Avonmouth container terminal on the right

- Location in United Kingdom

Location
- Country: United Kingdom
- Location: GBAVO
- Coordinates: 51°30′18″N 2°42′25″W

Details
- Opened: 1877
- Operated by: The Bristol Port Company (150 year lease from 1991)
- Owned by: Bristol City Council
- Type of harbour: Artificial
- No. of berths: 33
- Draft depth: 11.0 metres (36.1 ft)

Statistics
- Website; Official website

The Avonmouth Docks are part of the Port of Bristol, in England. They are situated on the northern side of the mouth of the River Avon, opposite the Royal Portbury Dock on the southern side, where the river joins the Severn estuary, within Avonmouth.

Accessible via a 210 metres (690 ft) long and 30 metres (98 ft) wide lock, today the docks are one of the UK's major ports for chilled foods, especially fruit and vegetables. Land-side freight access and distribution is via either the M5 motorway or the Henbury Loop Line, whilst rail-passenger access is via Avonmouth railway station on the Severn Beach Line.

== Background ==
Bristol Harbour had been a major centre of trade within the wider UK economy, due to its strategic location to the west of the country, allowing access to both the Atlantic Ocean and the Mediterranean. Coastal trade was also important, with the area called "Welsh Back" concentrating on trows with cargoes from the Slate industry in Wales, stone, timber and coal.

However, by the 18th century the docks in Liverpool grew larger and so increased competition with Bristol for the tobacco trade. The limitations of Bristol's docks were causing problems to business, so in 1802 William Jessop proposed installing a dam and lock at Hotwells to create the floating harbour. Construction of the £530,000 scheme began in May 1804, including the construction of the Cumberland Basin, the tidal new cut and a feeder canal to Temple Meads. Entrance was via locks, which had a maximum width of 45 ft (13.7 m). The harbour was officially opened on 1 May 1809.

However, the harbour improvements cost more than anticipated, requiring increased levies to pay back the required loans, and hence reducing the competitive advantage to Liverpool. By 1867, ships were getting larger and the meanders in the river Avon prevented boats over 300 ft (91 m) from reaching the harbour. A scheme was proposed to install a much larger lock at Avonmouth to make the entire river a floating harbour, and to straighten the sharper bends, was but was dropped after work began on the much cheaper docks at Avonmouth and Portishead. The present entrance lock was designed by Thomas Howard and opened in July 1873, with a width of 62 ft (18.9 m).

== History ==
=== Development ===
Due to numerous geographic and tidal restrictions along the River Avon, the Avonmouth Docks Co. was formed to build the new docks at Avonmouth. The new docks, now called Avonmouth Old Dock, were opened in February 1877, the hope being that this would usher in a new era for the port of Bristol. Around the same time the supporting Bristol Port Railway and Pier was constructed. The BPRP was built and held via a separate sister company, running north for 5.75 miles (9.25 km) from Hotwells (originally called Clifton), northwards to west of Bristol city centre between the Clifton Suspension Bridge and Bridge Valley Road along the Avon Gorge, to a pier terminus at Avonmouth. Bricks for the project were supplied by the Crown Brick Works, a venture set up by a partnership including Edwin Stride and his sons Jared and Jethro. The other partners were George Davis, with William and Jarman Peters. The brickworks are visible on the 1879 OS 25" map of the area. The company was dissolved in 1886.

=== Transport ===
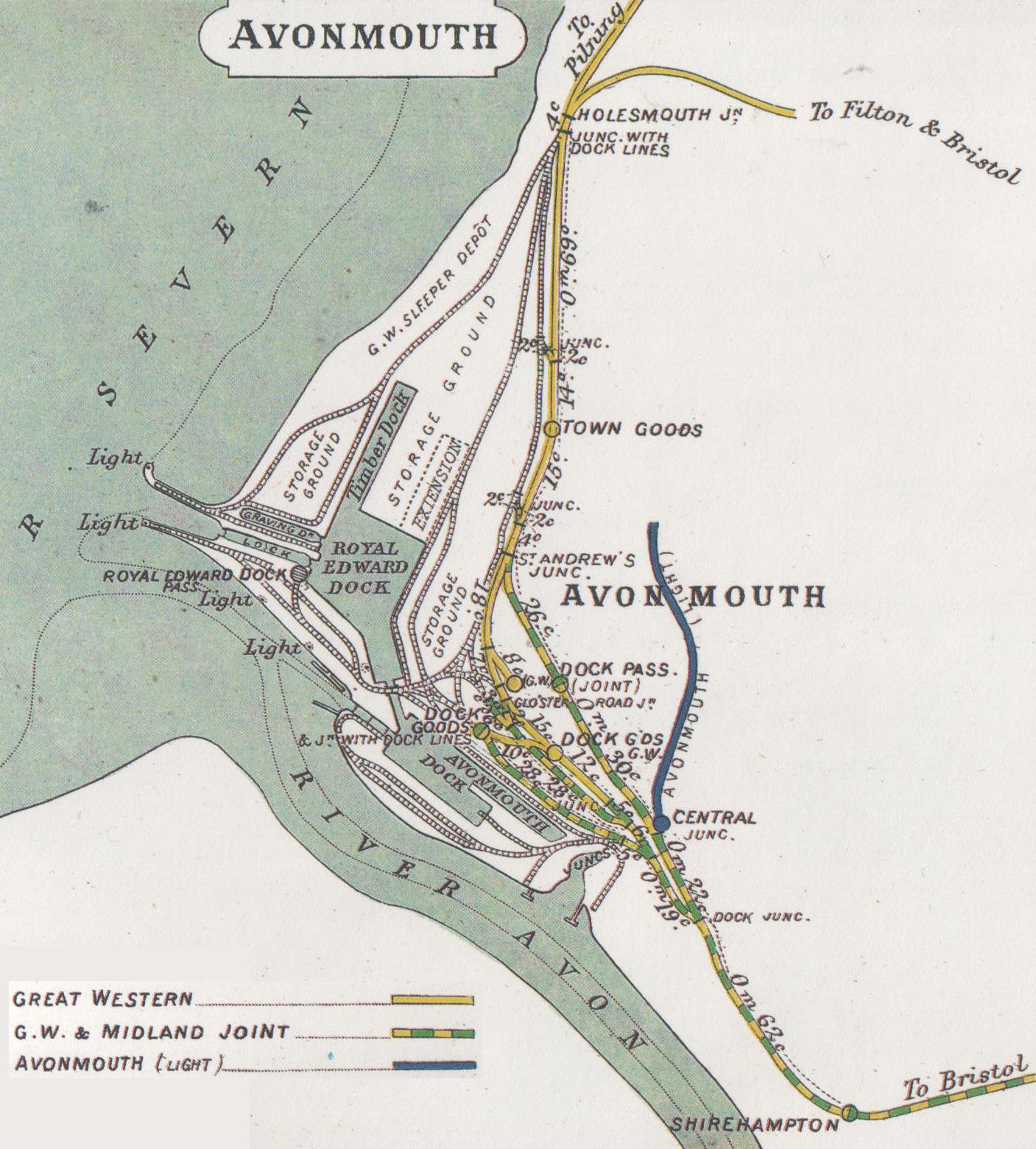
The Railway Clearing House Atlas of 1914 shows the then-extensive railway network around Avonmouth.

As built, the BPRP was isolated from the rest of the national railway network, having not been intended for anything more than local traffic distribution - a docks railway. However, due to the position of Clifton station and the large amount of developed land in the Hotwells area, an extension towards the city's main station at Bristol Temple Meads, would have been prohibitively expensive. Instead, a link was proposed from the BPRP at Sneyd Park, running under Clifton Down and through the suburbs to connect to the main lines of the Midland Railway and the Bristol and South Wales Union Railway.

The connection was authorised in 1867, but the BPRP was in financial difficulties, and so unable to complete the line. It entered into negotiations with the MR and Great Western Railway, the latter now the owner of the Bristol and South Wales Union Railway. However, fierce competition between the GWR and the MR posed a threat to the Port of Bristol. The MR had no access over the GWR routes into either Bristol Harbour or Avonmouth docks, and so drew up options to either acquire the Avonmouth Docks Co., or build new docks on the opposite bank at Portbury. The result was that in 1884, the Bristol Corporation bought Avonmouth Docks and the BPRP to control port facilities in the area.

The Clifton Extension Railway initially ran from Clifton Down to Narroways Hill Junction north through Bristol, then part of the GWR; and over a viaduct from Narroways Hill to the MR's Bristol to Gloucester Line near Fishponds. The line was managed by the Clifton Extension Railway Joint Committee, a triumvirate of the Port Authority, City Council plus the GWR and MR; but in 1894 responsibility was passed to the Great Western & Midland Railways Joint Committee. Services began to Clifton Down on 1 October 1874.

=== Royal Edward Dock ===
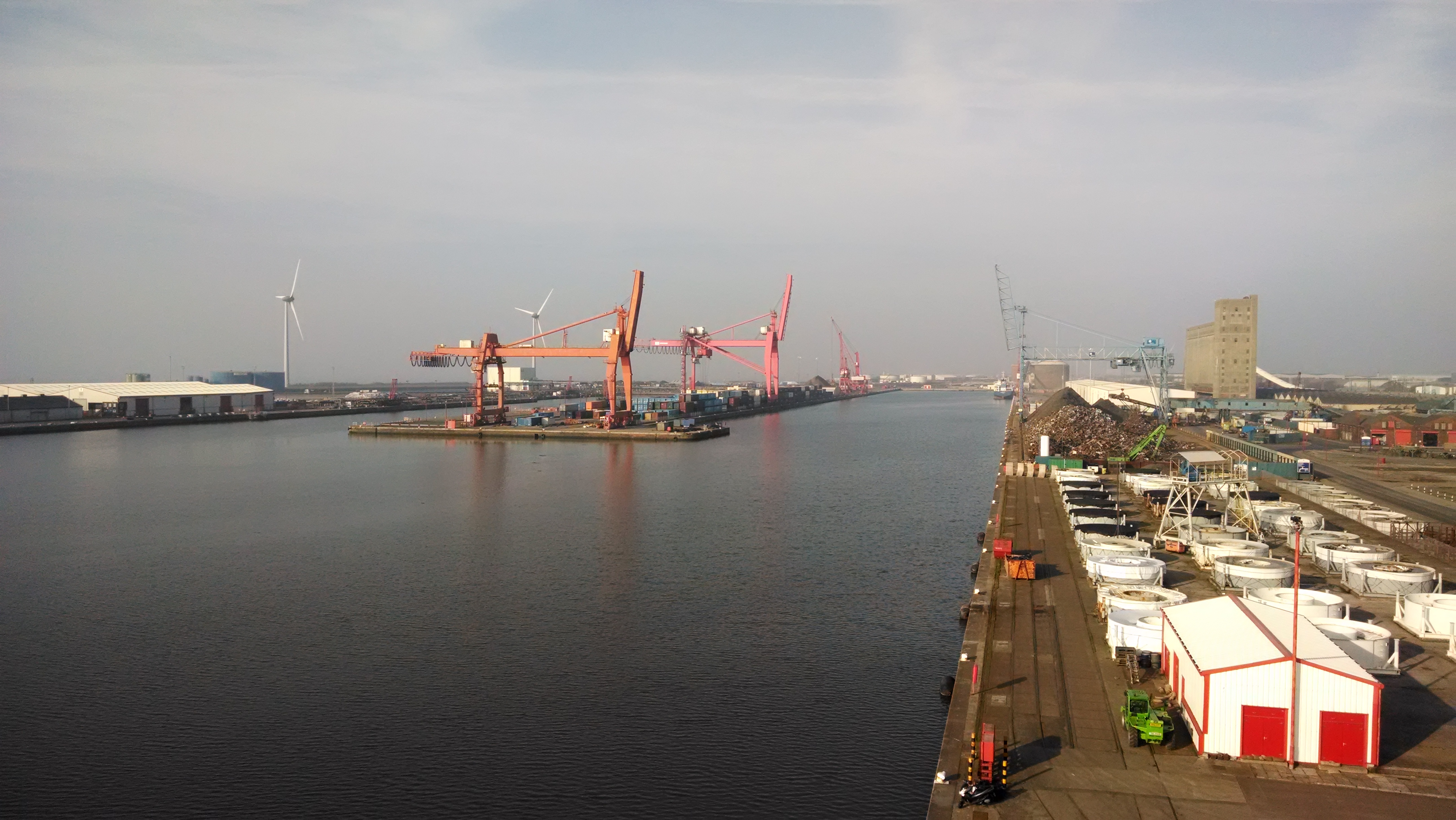
Royal Edward Dock, March 2014

The Royal Edward Dock was designed by consulting engineers Benjamin Baker and John Wolfe-Barry, who had worked together on several dock projects, together with Baker’s partner A.C. Hurtzig, and C.A. Brereton. The docks run south to north along the banks of the River Severn, closer to that river than the existing Avonmouth Docks, and is the northernmost and largest of the three docks that form the Port of Bristol. Work began in 1902, when the then Prince of Wales cut the first sod, which included the construction of a 267 metres (876 ft) dry dock. The complex was opened by the then King Edward VII in 1908.

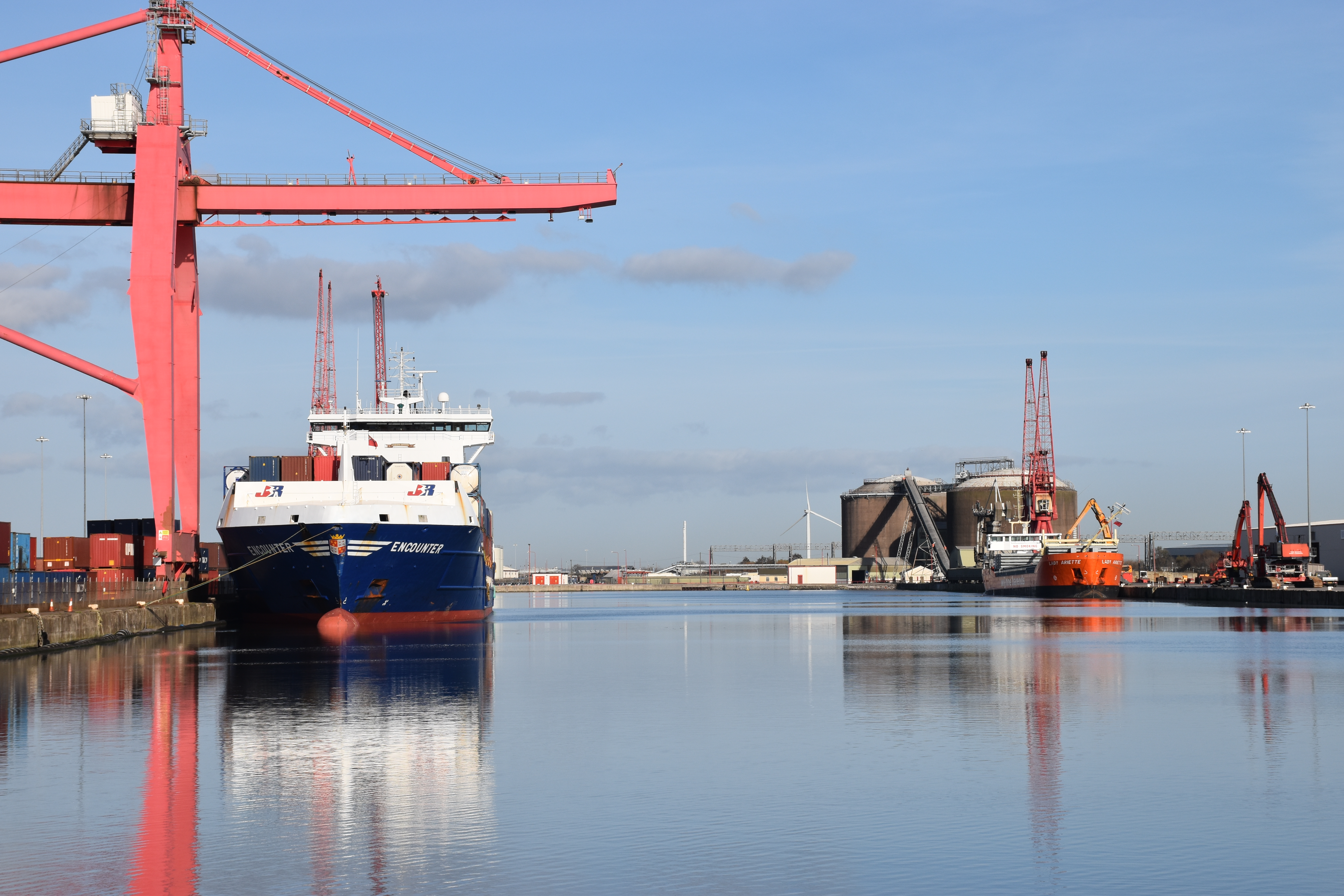
Royal Edward Dock, November 2017

Throughout its life, the shore side dock facilities have been redeveloped to keep the docks operational. By 1911, 27 storage tanks for oil had been added on the north west quay, and new grain silos were built in 1928. During World War II the docks were enlarged from 1941, adding more facilities for unloading oil and petrol, plus a new oil products supply pipeline to London via the Government Pipelines and Storage System.

By the 1960s, the larger container ships could not navigate the River Avon to enter the Royal Edward, necessitating the need for the planning of the construction of the Royal Portbury Dock on the south bank. Whilst much of the former warehousing was redeveloped as residential housing, the residual quays were redeveloped for new cargos. Today these range from the export of scrap-metals, dredged aggregates, vegetable oil and domestic coal; with regional container services from and to Ireland, Europe and Scandinavia, all linked to the rail network via the Henbury Loop Line.

=== Mustard gas ===
During the later part of World War I, it was proposed to make Avonmouth the UK centre of production of dichloroethyl sulphide, also known as mustard gas. However, its production was against the Hague Conventions of 1899 and 1907, which explicitly forbade the use of "poison or poisoned weapons" in warfare. Under the cover of the Official Secrets Act, the Ministry of Munitions under its then Minister Winston Churchill nationalised many small smelting works under the new National Smelting Company (NSC). Before the outbreak of WW1, much of Britain's zinc had originated in Australia, but had been smelted in Germany. The NSC was therefore publicly commissioned to build a new zinc smelting works and sulphuric acid plant at Merebank, Avonmouth.

With the nearby No.23 Filling Factory at Chittening, plus the main plant at Banbury and a third plant at Hereford, construction of the chemical plant began at Avonmouth in 1917, but did not finish until 1923, costing £800,000. The plant came into operation from spring 1918, producing 20 tonnes (22 tons) of dichloroethyl sulphide using the Despretz–Niemann–Guthrie process; the chemical agent was then placed into shells on site. Although the first product did not arrive in France until September 1918, two months before the Armistice, it was used that same month during the breaking of the Hindenburg Line within the Hundred Days' Offensive. By November 1918, Chittening had produced 85,424 mustard gas shells.

The human cost of producing mustard gas was high. In December 1918 the chemical plant's medical officer reported that in the six months it was operational, there were 1,400 illnesses reported by its 1,100 mostly female workers - all medically attributable to their work. Three people died because of accidents, four died from associated illnesses, and there were 160 accidents resulting in over 1,000 burns. At Chittening there were reported 1,213 cases of associated illness, including two deaths which were later attributed to influenza.

=== Britannia smelting works ===
After World War I, demand for zinc and for sulphuric acid greatly fell, and after running into commercial difficulties it was taken over by a group of British industrialists with interests in metals and chemicals, under whom it was revived. In 1929 the NSC was bought by Australia's Imperial Smelting Corporation, which in 1949 merged with Zinc Corporation to become Consolidated Zinc. After the consolidation, the smaller NSC plants were closed down to concentrate production on Avonmouth - now known as the Britannia smelting works - where the famous Imperial Smelting Process was developed. From 1967, the Avonmouth Works was home to the largest and most efficient zinc blast furnace in the world.

Consolidated Zinc, having failed to develop suitable new mining projects, merged from 1962 with the Rio Tinto Company, a mining company. The resulting company, known as the Rio Tinto - Zinc Corporation (RTZ), and its main subsidiary, Conzinc Riotinto of Australia (CRA), would eventually become today's Rio Tinto Group. With smelting cheaper elsewhere in the world, the site ceased production in the 1970s, but remained open as a stock-holding and distribution centre until 2003.

In 2012 SITA UK started redevelopment of the site, but after construction workers were affected by mustard-gas type symptoms, the Ministry of Defence were called in to test and approve the site. However, after MoD approval, a few months later construction workers found a mustard gas shell, which was disposed of by the 11 Explosive Ordnance Disposal Regiment RLC at Porton Down. The site was closed off for a year while experts from the Defence Science and Technology Laboratory conducted a series of tests. In late 2013 MoD clearance was given, allowing the site to be redeveloped as a 485,000 square feet (45,100 m^{2}) supermarket distribution centre for Asda, and a recycling plant for SITA UK.

== Operations ==
The docks were operated by the Port of Bristol Authority, part of Bristol City Council, until 1991, when the council granted a 150-year lease to the Bristol Port Company, who now operate the docks together with Royal Portbury Dock.

=== Bulk Coal Terminal ===
The bulk coal terminal discharged imported coal from both the Royal Edward and Royal Portbury docks, via a rail-loading system managed by DB Cargo UK, located just south of St Andrews Road railway station on the Severn Beach line. At the Royal Edward, a Gottwald HSK 260 Harbour Crane can unload up to 10,000 tonnes of coal per day; whilst two 2,500 tonne rapid bulk-handling conveyors at Royal Portbury discharge into a conveyor system which runs under the River Avon in a tunnel. Freight trains are moved automatically under the bunkers at 0.8 kilometres per hour (0.50 mph), allowing a 1,750 tonnes (1,930 tons) train to be fully and automatically loaded in under 36 minutes.
