= Marlene Gottwald =

German politician (born 1985)

- Gottwald in 2025

Member of the Landtag of Rhineland-Palatinate
- Incumbent
- Assumed office 18 May 2026

Personal details
- Born: 17 March 1985 (age 41)
- Party: Social Democratic Party (since 2016)

Marlene Gottwald (born 17 March 1985) is a German politician serving as a member of the Landtag of Rhineland-Palatinate since 2026. She has served as spokesperson for climate protection and energy policy of the Social Democratic Party group since 2026.
