= List of places named after Klement Gottwald =

This is a list of places which are located in Czech Republic, Slovakia and Germany named in honor of the 5th President of Czechoslovakia Klement Gottwald.

== Cities and districts ==
=== Czech Republic ===
- Gottwaldov (1949–1989) — Zlín

=== Slovakia ===
- Gottwaldova štvrť (1969-1989), — now Sídlisko Lány, Považská Bystrica

== Streets and squares ==
=== Bulgaria ===
- Ulitsa Klenent Gotvald (Klement Gottwald Street) in Sofia. Now part of Evlogi and Hristo Georgievi Boulevard.
- Ulitsa Klement Gotvald (Klement Gottwald Street) in Pernik. Still bears the same name as of 2024.

=== Slovakia ===
- Ulica Klementa Gottwalda (Klement Gottwald Street), – now Štefánikova Ulica, Košice
- Gottwaldovo námestie (Gottwald Square), – now Námestie Slobody, Bratislava
- Gottwaldova (?–1990) (Gottwald Street), – now Masarykova ulica, Michalovce
- Gottwaldova (Gottwald Street), – now 17. novembra, Prešov
- Gottwaldova (Gottwald Street), – now Študentská, Trnava
- Gottwaldovo námestie (Gottwald Square), – now Trojičné námestie, Trnava
- Gottwaldova ulica (Gottwald Street), now M.R.Štefánika, Veľký Krtíš
- Gottwaldova ulica (Gottwald Street), now Štefánikova ulica, Žilina
- Gottwaldova (Gottwald Street), Jelka
- Gottwaldova (Gottwald Street), Šoporňa
- Klementa Gottwalda (Klement Gottwald Street), Želovce

=== Czech Republic ===
- Gottwaldova ulice (Gottwald Street), – now 28. října, Zlín
- Gottwaldova (1949–1990) (Gottwald Street), – now Cejl, Brno
- Gottwaldovo nábřeží (Gottwald Embankment), – now Smetanovo nábřeží, Prague
- Gottwaldova ulice (Gottwald Street), – now Churchillova, Ústí nad Labem
- Gottwaldova ulice (Gottwald Street), – now Palachova, Poděbrady
- ulice Gottwaldova (Gottwald Street), – now Jablunkovská, Třinec
- Gottwaldova (Gottwald Street), – now Přemyslova, Kralupy nad Vltavou
- Gottwaldova ulice (Gottwald Street), – now Obránců míru, Uničov
- Gottwaldovo náměstí (Gottwald Square), – now Ulrichovo náměstí, Hradec Králové

== Places ==
=== Czech Republic ===
- Gottwaldova (metro stanice) (Gottwald Street (metro station), – now Vyšehrad, Prague

== Statues ==
=== Slovakia ===
- Socha Klementa Gottwalda (1975–1989), Košice
- Gottwaldovo súsošie (1980–1990), Bratislava
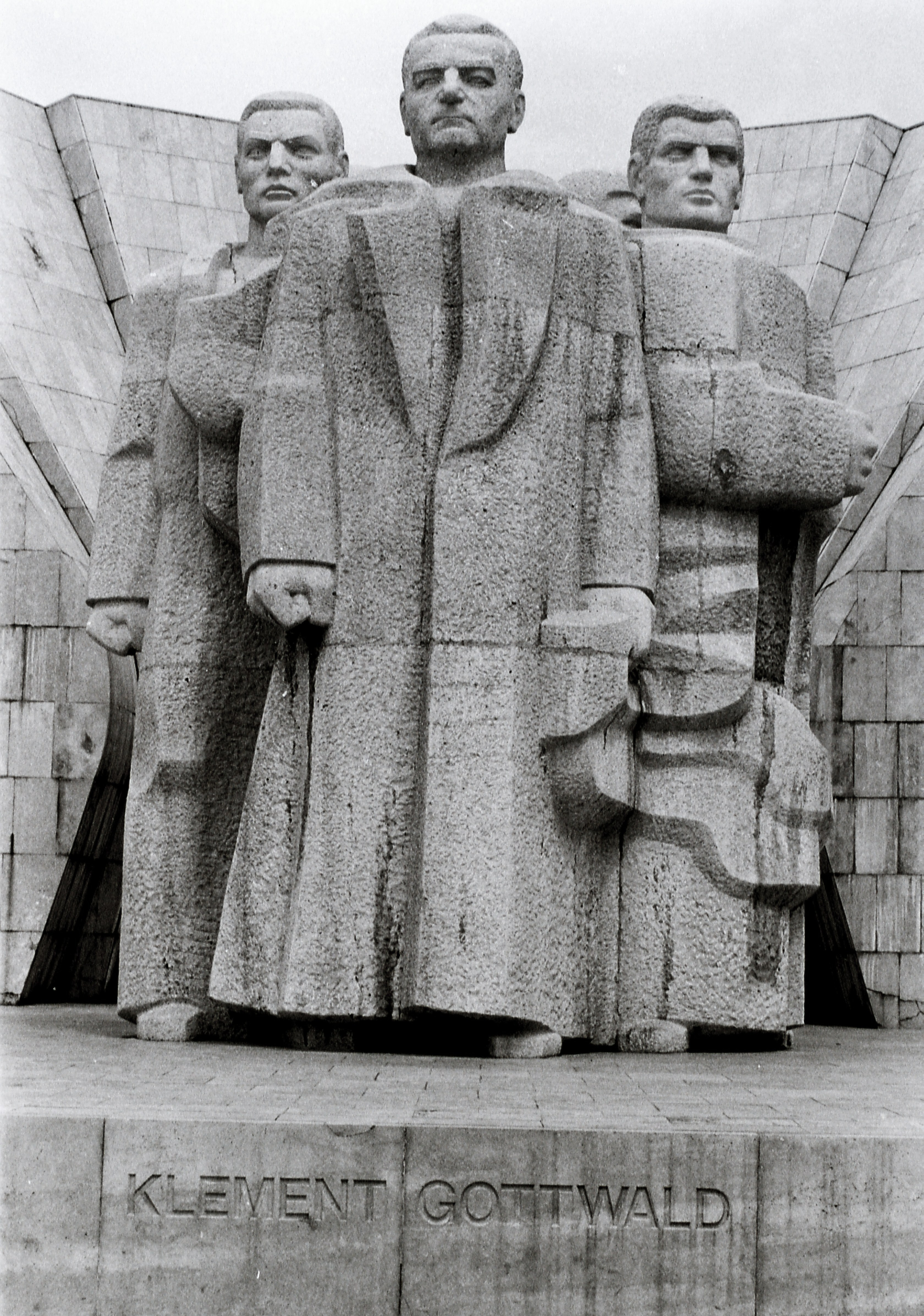
Statue of Klement Gottwald on Gottwald Square (now Námestie Slobody) in Bratislava

=== Czech Republic ===
- Pomník Klementa Gottwalda (1973–1990), Hradec Králové
- Socha Klementa Gottwalda (1961–1989), Zlín
- Socha Klementa Gottwalda (1981–1990), Palacký University Olomouc, Olomouc
- Socha Klementa Gottwalda (1958–1990), Šumperk
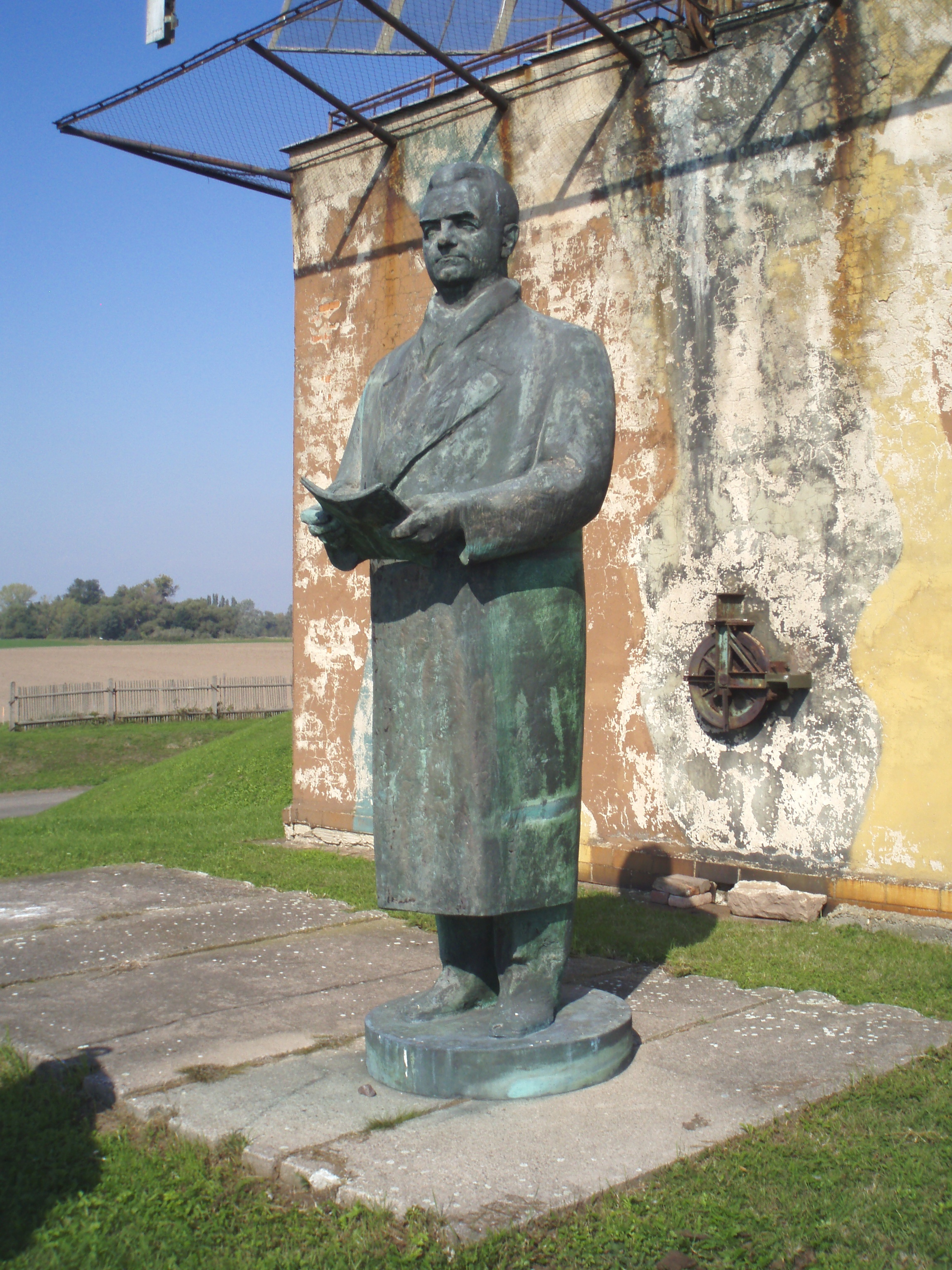
Monument of Klement Gottwald in Hradec Králové

=== Germany ===
- Statue von Klement Gottwald (?–1990s), Gundelfingen
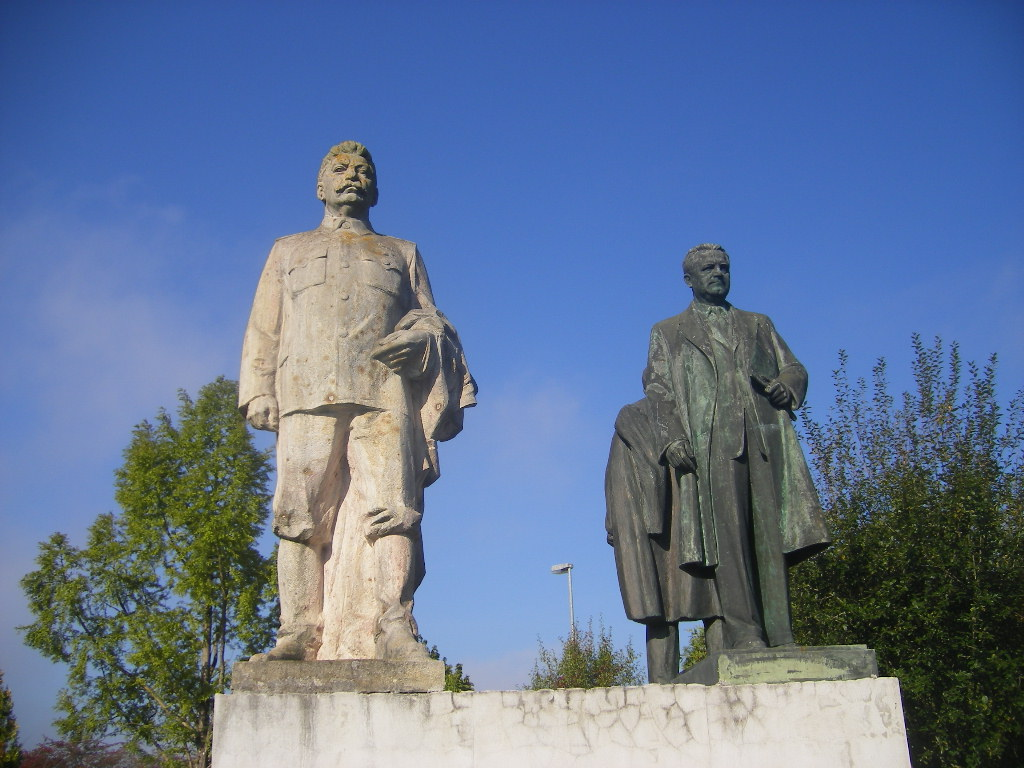
Statue of Klement Gottwald and Joseph Stalin in Gundelfingen
