= Credenhill =

Village in Herefordshire, England

Coordinates: 52.085°N 2.805°W

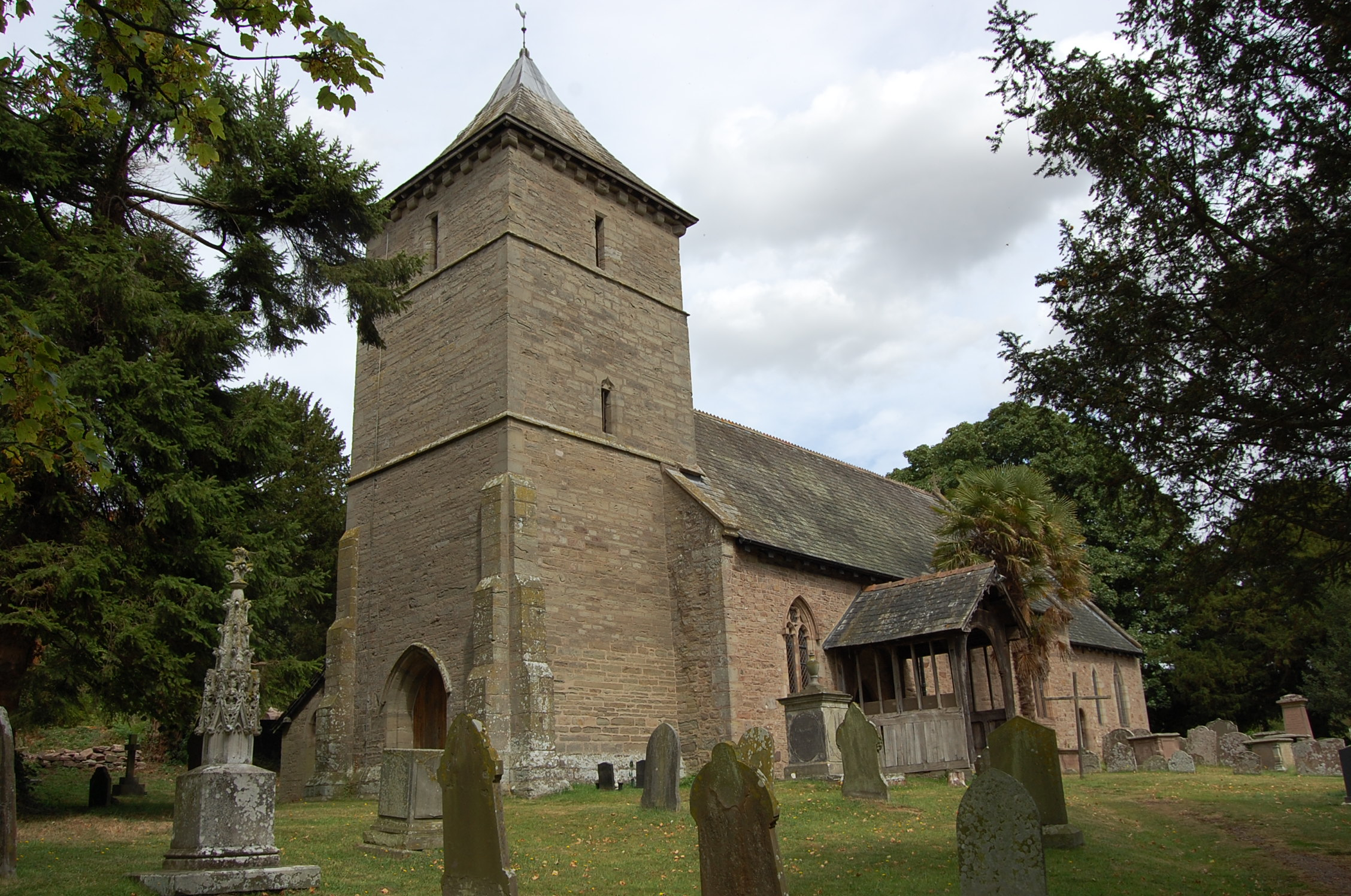
- St Mary's Church, Credenhill

- Location within Herefordshire
- Population: 2,271 (2011 Census)
- District: Herefordshire
- Shire county: Herefordshire
- Region: West Midlands
- Country: England
- Sovereign state: United Kingdom
- Post town: Hereford
- Postcode district: HR4
- Dialling code: 01432
- Police: West Mercia
- Fire: Hereford and Worcester
- Ambulance: West Midlands
- UK Parliament: North Herefordshire

Credenhill is a village and civil parish in Herefordshire, England. The population of this civil parish taken at the 2011 Census was 2,271.

== History ==
Credenhill village has had military connections since 80 BC, when Iron Age Celts constructed a hill fort and earthwork defence system commanding the surrounding area. The Romans founded the town of Magnis at what is now Kenchester, which was later abandoned during the withdrawal of Roman armies from Britain. In 428 AD Magnis was destroyed by a fire during raids by the Picts and Scots. The remains of the old fort was occupied by the Saxons in 480 AD. The Saxon chief Creoda occupied the fort in 540 AD, and "Creoda's Hill" gave its name to Credenhill.

During the First World War, land in Credenhill was occupied by an army unit to store ammunition. In 1939 the land was requisitioned for defence and became RAF Hereford.

== Governance ==
An electoral ward of the same name exists. This ward stretches south to Breinton with a total ward population as at the 2011 Census of 3,612.

== Landmarks ==
There is an Iron Age hill fort half a mile north of Credenhill. Archaeological finds are in Hereford Museum. The defences of this very large hill fort follow the 600 ft contour and enclose nearly 50 acres (200,000 m^{2}). They comprise an embankment and ditch with a slight counter-scarp bank. There are traces of a quarry ditch inside the main rampart around most of the circuit. Original in-turned entrances are at the centre of the east side and at the south-east corner, each approached by a hollow way cut deeply into the hillside.

Trial excavation has shown that the internal quarry-ditch is 5–10 ft deep. Its gradual in-filling was found to include various occupation layers associated with rectangular wooden buildings with four corner posts, measuring about 12 x 8 ft (2.4 m), which had been rebuilt several times in the same place. There were also storage pits and other remains of occupation including pottery with stamped and incised patterns typical of the West Midlands Iron Age. Date, c. 400 BC; occupied continuously until about 75 AD. The fort and the surrounding ancient woodland are now part of the Woodland Trust.

The 12th-century church of St Mary is a grade I listed building.

Near Credenhill is the site of the former Royal Air Force station, RAF Credenhill. It was redeveloped by the British Army for new headquarters for the 22 Special Air Service Regiment, who moved out in 1999. The following year, the base was garrisoned as Stirling Lines.

== Notable people ==
- Credenhill has links to cider production, one of Herefordshire's key industries. In 1887 Percy Bulmer founded the Bulmers cider company. The then 20-year-old son of the Reverend Charles Bulmer (rector of Credenhill) used apples from the rectory garden for the company's first produce.
- Thomas Traherne, the 17th-century English poet and religious writer, was rector of Credenhill for ten years.

== Climate ==
At Credenhill, the temperature is usually between −0.8 °C (30.6 °F) and 23.2 °C (73.8 °F). The highest recorded temperature was 33.6 °C (92.5 °F) in July 2006, and the coldest was −15.8 °C (3.6 °F) on 26 December 2010. In contrast, the minimum temperature on 26 December 2015 was 12.9 °C (55.2 °F), higher than even the average July night, the warmest month of the year. The frostiest month is February, with an average of 10.5 days recording a temperature below 0.1 °C (32.2 °F). There are no air frosts in meteorological summer. The whole year averages about 49.3 days with an air frost. It is windiest in March, the average wind speed is 7.2 miles per hour (11.6 km/h). It is calmest in July, when the average wind speed at 10 m is just 5.1 miles per hour (8.2 km/h). The yearly average wind speed is 6.1 miles per hour (9.8 km/h).
