= Dinedor Hill =

Hill in Herefordshire, England

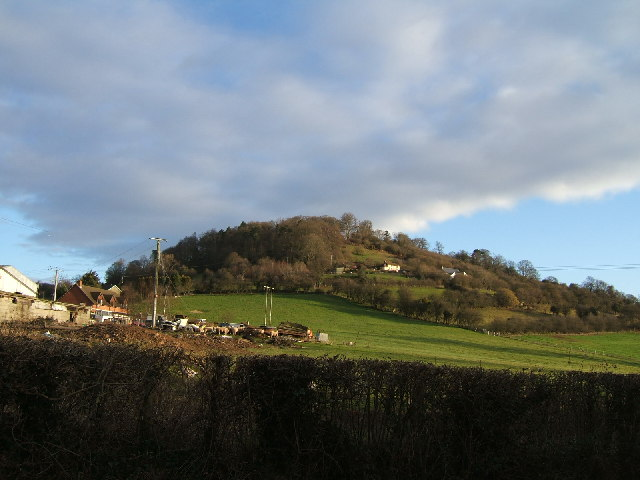
- Dinedor Camp

Highest point
- Elevation: 182.88 m (600.0 ft)
- Coordinates: 52.0235°N 2.6963°W

Geography
- Location: Herefordshire, England
- OS grid: SO522363
- Topo map: OS Landranger 149

Dinedor Hill is situated 2.5 miles south of Hereford. It is the site of Dinedor Camp, an Iron Age hillfort. More specifically a promontory fort. It is a Scheduled Monument first designated in 1928. It was occupied until late into the first century CE. Roman coins dating from 68-9 CE have been found there.

The hill has been a local visitor attraction since at least the late 19th century.

The name dates back to at least the Roman period and was originally derived from the Welsh words din (fort) and bre (hill)
