= National Smelting Company =

Zinc smelting and chemical works in Bristol, England

The National Smelting Company was a nationalised zinc smelting company in Avonmouth, England. It was established by Minister of Munitions Winston Churchill to produce mustard gas during World War I.

After World War I, it was bought by private business interests. From 1929 it became part of Australia's Imperial Smelting Corporation. The site – also known as the Britannia smelting works – was where the Imperial Smelting Process was developed. From 1967, the Avonmouth Works was home to the largest and most efficient zinc blast furnace in the world.

The site remained operational until 2003 when the production of zinc, cadmium, lead and sulphuric acid ceased.

The site is being redeveloped as a 485,000 square feet (45,100 m^{2}) supermarket distribution centre for Asda and a recycling plant for SITA UK.

== Background ==
During the later part of World War I, it was proposed to make Avonmouth Docks the UK centre of production of dichloroethyl sulphide, also known as mustard gas. However, its production was against the Hague Conventions of 1899 and 1907, which explicitly forbade the use of "poison or poisoned weapons" in warfare. Hence covered by the Official Secrets Act, as a cover the Ministry of Munitions under its minister Winston Churchill nationalised many small smelting works under the new National Smelting Company (NSC). Before the outbreak of World War I, much of Britain's zinc had originated in Australia, but had been smelted in Germany. The NSC was hence publicly commissioned to build a new zinc smelting works and sulphuric acid plant at Merebank, Avonmouth Docks.

== Mustard gas ==
Having already built the nearby No.23 filling factory at Chittening, operated by Nobel Explosives, shells there were already being filled with chloropicrin.

Construction of the chemical plant began in 1917, but did not finish until 1923, costing £800,000. The plant came into operation from Spring 1918, producing 20 tonnes (22 tons) of dichloroethyl sulphide using the Despretz–Niemann–Guthrie process per day. The chemical product was than shipped to the main filling factory production site at Banbury, plus secondary sites at Chittening and Hereford. Although the first shells did not arrive in France until September 1918, two months before The Armistice, it was used that same month during the breaking of the Hindenburg Line within the Hundred Days' Offensive. By November 1918, Chittening had produced 85,424 mustard gas shells.

The human cost of producing mustard gas was high. In December 1918 the chemical plant's medical officer reported that in the six months it was operational, there were 1,400 illnesses reported by its 1,100 mostly female workers – all medically attributable to their work. Three people died because of accidents, four died from associated illnesses, and there were 160 accidents resulting in over 1,000 burns. At Chittening there were reported 1,213 cases of associated illness, including two deaths which were later attributed to influenza.

== Operational history ==
After World War I, demand for zinc and sulphuric acid greatly fell, and after running into commercial difficulties it was taken over by a group of British industrialists with interests in metals and chemicals, who succeeded in reviving its business under the name Commonwealth Smelting Company. In 1929 the NSC was bought by Australia's Imperial Smelting Corporation, which in 1949 merged with Zinc Corporation to become Consolidated Zinc.

Throughout the consolidation, the smaller NSC plants were closed down to concentrate production on Avonmouth – now known as the Britannia smelting works – where the Imperial Smelting Process was developed. From 1967, the Avonmouth Works was home to the largest and most efficient zinc blast furnace in the world.

Consolidated Zinc, having failed to develop suitable new mining projects, merged from 1962 with the Rio Tinto Company, a mining company. The resulting company, known as The Rio Tinto – Zinc Corporation (RTZ), and its main subsidiary, Conzinc Riotinto of Australia (CRA), would eventually become today's Rio Tinto. With smelting cheaper elsewhere in the world, the site ceased production in the 1990s, but remained open as a stock-holding and distribution centre until 2003.

Plants and support services in operation during the late 1960s include:

12. The Sulfuric Acid Plant

3. The Vertical Retort Plant – a zinc plant 4. The Sinter Plant 5. The Cadmium Plant 6. The Beryllium Plant 7. The Works Laboratory 8. The General Stores 9. The Changing Rooms 10. The Hydrofluoric Acid Plant 11. The Isceon Plant – a hydrocarbon refrigerant plant 12. The Aluminum Sulfate Plant 13. The Plant Investigation Department 14. The Sample House 15. Yard and Traffic 16. Vehicle Shop 17. Main workshop 18. Water Fitters Shop 19. Ammonium Sulfate Plant 20. The Works Study Department 21. The Model Shop 22. The Works Estimators Department 23. The Medical Department 24. The Fire Department 25. Security 26. The Instrument Shop 27. The Instrument Development Shop 28. Battery Acid plant 29. The Zinc Stores 30. Personnel Office 31. Main office block 32. Works Pay Stations 33. The Research Pilot Plant. 34. The Green Ore Store. 35. Works Labs 36. Zinc road canteen 37. Works canteen 38. Training Centre 39. Phosphate Plant 40. Staff canteen 41. Main gate entrance. 42. Zinc Ore bucket overhead delivery line - from ships at the docks. 43. Main employee car park.

== Redevelopment ==
In 2012 SITA UK started redevelopment of the site, but after construction workers were affected by mustard-gas type symptoms, the Ministry of Defence were called in to test and approve the site. However, after MoD approval, a few months later construction workers found a mustard gas shell, which was disposed of by the 11 Explosive Ordnance Disposal Regiment RLC at Porton Down. The site was closed off for a year while experts from the Defence Science and Technology Laboratory conducted a series of tests. In late 2013 MoD clearance was given, allowing the site to be redeveloped as a 485,000 square feet (45,100 m^{2}) supermarket distribution centre for Asda, and a recycling plant for SITA UK.

== See also ==
- William Champion (metallurgist)
