= Brinsop and Wormsley =

Civil parish in Herefordshire, England

Coordinates: 52.111°N 2.81625°W

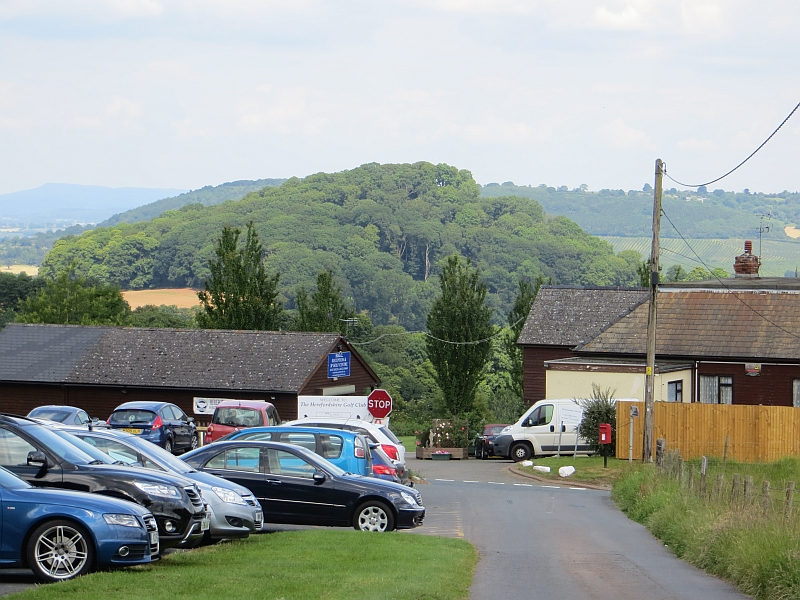
- Herefordshire Golf Club at Wormsley

- Location within Herefordshire
- OS grid reference: SO441461
  - London: 125 mi (201 km) SE
- Unitary authority: Herefordshire
- Ceremonial county: Herefordshire
- Region: West Midlands
- Country: England
- Sovereign state: United Kingdom
- Post town: Hereford
- Postcode district: HR4
- Dialling code: 01432
- Police: West Mercia
- Fire: Hereford and Worcester
- Ambulance: West Midlands
- UK Parliament: North Herefordshire

Brinsop and Wormsley is a civil parish in the county of Herefordshire, England. It includes the largely depopulated village settlements of Brinsop and Wormsley, and is approximately 6 miles (10 km) north-west from the city and county town of Hereford. The parish includes the Church of St George and Brinsop Court, both Grade I listed.

== History ==
Brinsop, named 'Bruneshopa' in c.1130, and 'Brunhopa' in 1178, means "enclosed valley of a man called brūn or brȳni", being an Old English man's name with the addition of 'hop', probably referring to a 'hop valley', or "a remote enclosed space; a piece of enclosed land in a fen; an enclosure in marsh or moor". Wormsley, 'Wermeslai' in the Domesday Book, Worvesleg in 1180, Wurmeleys in 1242, and Wrmesl in 1249, indicates the Old English woodland glade a clearing of a man called 'Wyrm', alternatively a 'leah' (clearing) infested with Wyrma's, i.e. snakes, reptiles or dragons.

Both Brinsop and Wormsley are listed in Domesday. Brinsop, in the Hundred of Cutestornes, included seven villagers, fifteen smallholders (middle level of serf owning about 5 acres (2.0 ha) of land, below and with less land than a villager), a priest, and a population of five others, within an area (ploughland), defined by 2.5 lord's and 5.5 men's plough teams. In 1066 Earl Harold was the lord of Brinsop, lordship transferred in 1086 to Richard, with Alfred of Marlborough [Alured de Merleberg], as tenant-in-chief to king William I. Wormsley (Wermeslai) was in the Hundred of Stepleset, and was subject to the lands of three owners. The first, in 1066, was the canons of St Peter's in Hereford, whose Wormsley land included two villagers and one men's plough team. In 1086, lordship had transferred to a 'man-at-arms', but with St Peter's canons remaining as the tenant-in-chief to the king. The second, in 1066, were the lords Alwy and Wulfnoth, with the land in 1086, comprising two smallholders, a priest, and 1.5 lord's and 1.5 men's plough teams, transferred to Leofric, under the tenancy-in-chief of Roger de Lacy. The third owner, of an area of one ploughland, was Hadwy in 1066, by 1086 falling under the lordship and tenancy-in-chief of Roger of Lacy.

=== 19th century ===
During the 19th century, both Brinsop and Wormsley were their own parishes. By the 1850s both parishes, part of the Grimsworth hundred, were in the Weobley Union—poor relief and joint parish workhouse provision set up under the Poor Law Amendment Act 1834—and the Hereford deanery, archdeaconry and diocese. The post town for Brinsop was Hereford, which was the nearest money order office, with letters arriving by foot; that of Wormsley was Weobley, its nearest money order office. Wormsley was 5 miles (8 km) west from Moreton-on-Lugg railway station, on the Shrewsbury and Hereford Railway, while the parish was said to "command delightful views of the Malvern and Clee hills". The Hereford to Kington turnpike road ran through both Brinsop and Wormsley. Brinsop population in 1851 was 154 in 1,360 acres (550 ha); Wormsley, 110 in 1,233 acres (499 ha) acres. Brinsop soil was described as "clayey and strong loam", on which were grown wheat, barley, oats, and peas; Wormsley as "clayey and gravel", with turnips, wheat, barley, and oats. One of the two chief landowners at Brinsop was David Ricardo, son to David Ricardo of Gatcombe Park, Gloucestershire; while one of the two at Wormsley was Sir William Rouse-Boughton, Baronet, MP, who was also the lord of the manor. Brinsop Court, a half a mile north from the church, was described as an ancient mansion, that had "evidently been an old monastery, and is surrounded by a deep moat". A tree had been planted by the poet William Wordsworth, who, with Robert Southey, was a frequent visitor. Resident in Brinsop was the parish vicar, at the vicarage, with traders listed including three farmers, one of whom was at Brinscop Court, and a miller at Brinscop Mill. At Wormsley were a stonemason, carpenter, a blacksmith, and three farmers, one of whom was at Wormsley Court.

St George's church at Brinsop was described as "an ancient structure, the foundation dating from the time of King Stephen", and a small stone building, of a three-bay nave, chancel, north aisle, south porch, and a turret with three bells. On the nave north wall interior were noted "several interesting sculptures", and in the chancel, "two marble monuments" dedicated to members of the Dansey family, who formerly lived at Brinsop Court. In the east window were remnants of "old painted glass". The parish living for the incumbent priest and the curate was a vicarage, with 73 acres (30 hectares) of glebe, an area of land used to support the parish church and priest. A Sunday school was held in the church. The vicarage was described as a "handsome and commodious modern-built mansion, in the Elizabethan style of architecture". Parish charities included those from the parish vicar, and £15 per year from donations of "landed proprietors". St Mary's church at Wormsley was seen as "an unpretending stone building", with a small tower with two hells. The living was a perpetual curracy, worth £75 yearly, with 4 acres (1.6 hectares) of glebe land, in the gift of Sir William Rouse-Boughton. At Wormsley was founded, by Gilbert Talbot and possibly at the time of King John (1166 – 1216), a priory of Augustine Black canons of the St Victor order, and dedicated to St Leonard de Pyona. Revenues from the priory at the dissolution were valued at £83 10s. 2d. yearly.

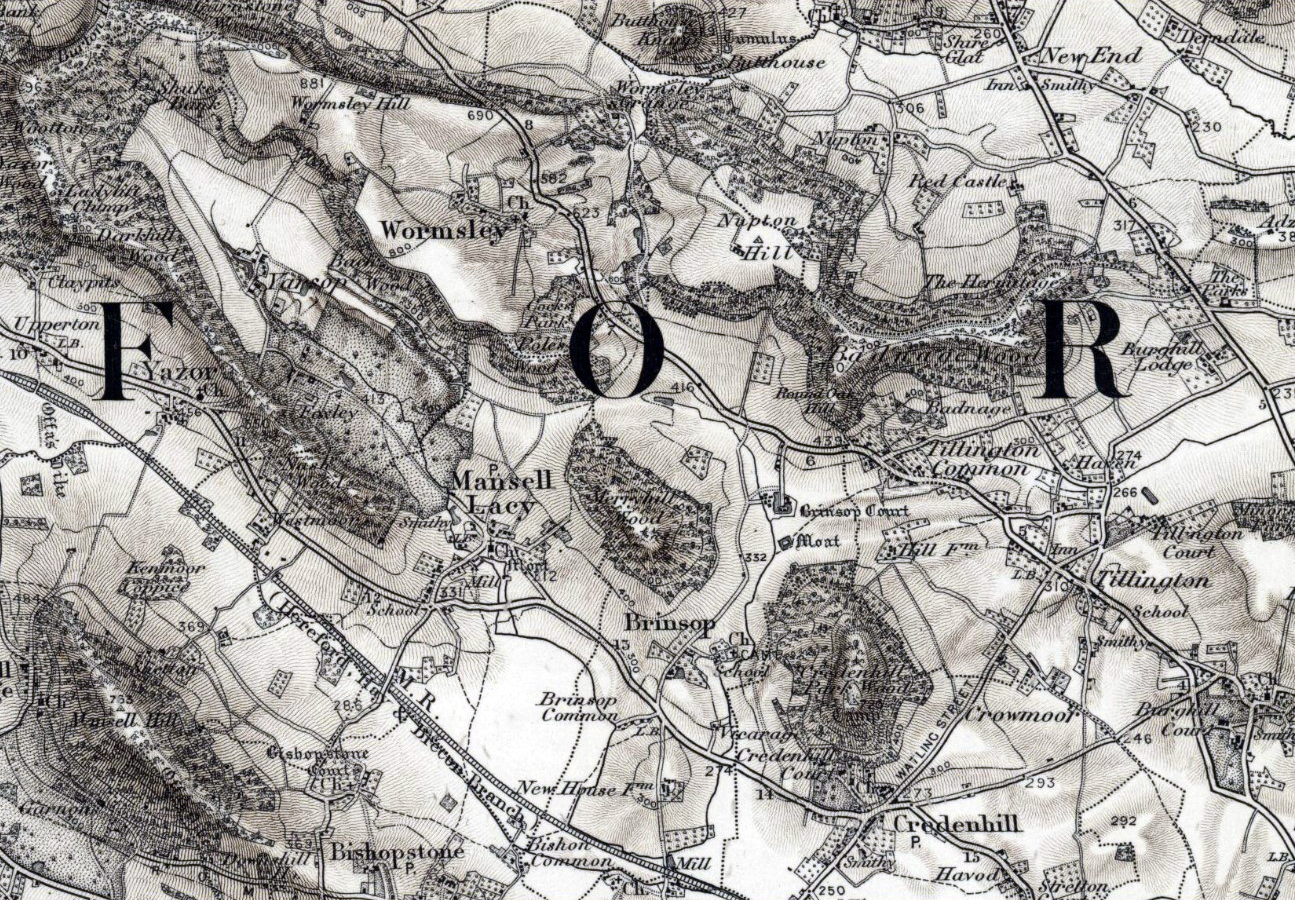
Brinsop and Wormsley in 1898

By the 1880s the parishes of Brinsop and Wormsley were part of the Northern division of Herefordshire, the Weobley petty sessional division, and the Hereford county court district. Brinsop was approximately 1.5 miles (2 km) north from the railway station at Credenhill, and Wormsley 2 miles (3 km) north-east from that at Moorhampton, both stations on the Hereford, Hay and Brecon Railway, later the Midland Railway. The railway line passed through the south of Brinsop parish. The Weobley and Hereford turnpike road still ran though both parishes. Brinsop parish area was now 1,364 acres (552 hectares), on which was grown wheat, barley, oats, peas, some hops, on a soil now said to be clayey with strong loam, over a subsoil of clay, gravel and limestone. Wormsley soil, still of 1,233 acres, was then said to be clayey with gravel, over a clay subsoil, growing crops of turnips, wheat, barley and oats, with the parish saying to command "delightful views of the Malvern and Cleo Hills and May Hill". Brinsop population in 1881 was 160; Wormsley, 78. Letters for both parishes were still arriving by foot from Herford, which was Brinsop's closest money order and telegraph office, whereas those for Wormsley, the closest was at Weobley. At Brinsop was now a National School (mixed), with residence for the school mistress, for 40 children, which had an average attendance of 27. Children of Wormsley attended school at Mansell Lacy. Brinsop Court, the former seat of the Dansey family, was now listed as a farmhouse, surrounded by a deep moat, while adjoining it was recorded a "remarkably fine hall", and in the grounds "a beautiful cedar, planted by the poet Wordsworth, who was a frequent visitor at the Court". Lord of the manor at Brinsop was Henry George Ricardo JP of Gatcombe Park, Minchinhampton, Gloucestershire, and of Wormsley, Andrew Rouse-Boughton-Knight DL, JP, of Downton Hall, Ludlow. Major landowners at Wormsley were the rector of Stanford on Soar who lived at Foxley, Hereford, and Major Daniel Peploe Peploe DL, JP, of Garnstone Castle, Weobley. A Weobley to Hereford carrier—transporter of trade goods, with sometimes people, between different settlements—passed though the parishes on Wednesday and Saturday. Listed at Brinsop were four farmer, one also a hop grower, a miller, and the parish sexton, while at Wormsley was a farmer who was alsoa hop grower, a cowkeeper, and a farm bailiff at Wormsly Court.

In the 1880s Brinsop ecclesiastical parish was in the rural deanery of Weston, Wormsley, that of Weobley, and in both the archdeaconry and diocese of Hereford. Brinsop church of St George is described as of Early English style. The nave north wall sculptures, the west wall marble monuments to members of the Dansey family, formerly of Brinsop Court, remains of old stained glass, are again mentioned. There was "other stained modern windows", one to William Wordsworth. The church was completely restored in 1866-67 from plans by William Cheiake (William Chick), of Hereford. The parish register dates to 1691. Glebe land had increased to 110 acres (45 hectares), with the living now in the gift of the Bishop of Hereford. The vicarage is described as a modern house in Elizabethan style. Wormsley church of St Mary had been restored. Communion plate in 1885 included a pewter flagon, dated 1716, while the parish register dated to 1749. A churchyard is a monument, with a Latin inscription, was to two sisters, Ursula and Barbara Knight, (1775-7). The living, previously a perpetual curacy, was now a vicarage, in the gift of Andrew Rouse-Boughton-Knight, the vicar, who resided at Kersoe, Worcestershire, also being the vicar of Mansell Lacy, while the curate in charge resided at Mansell-Lacy.

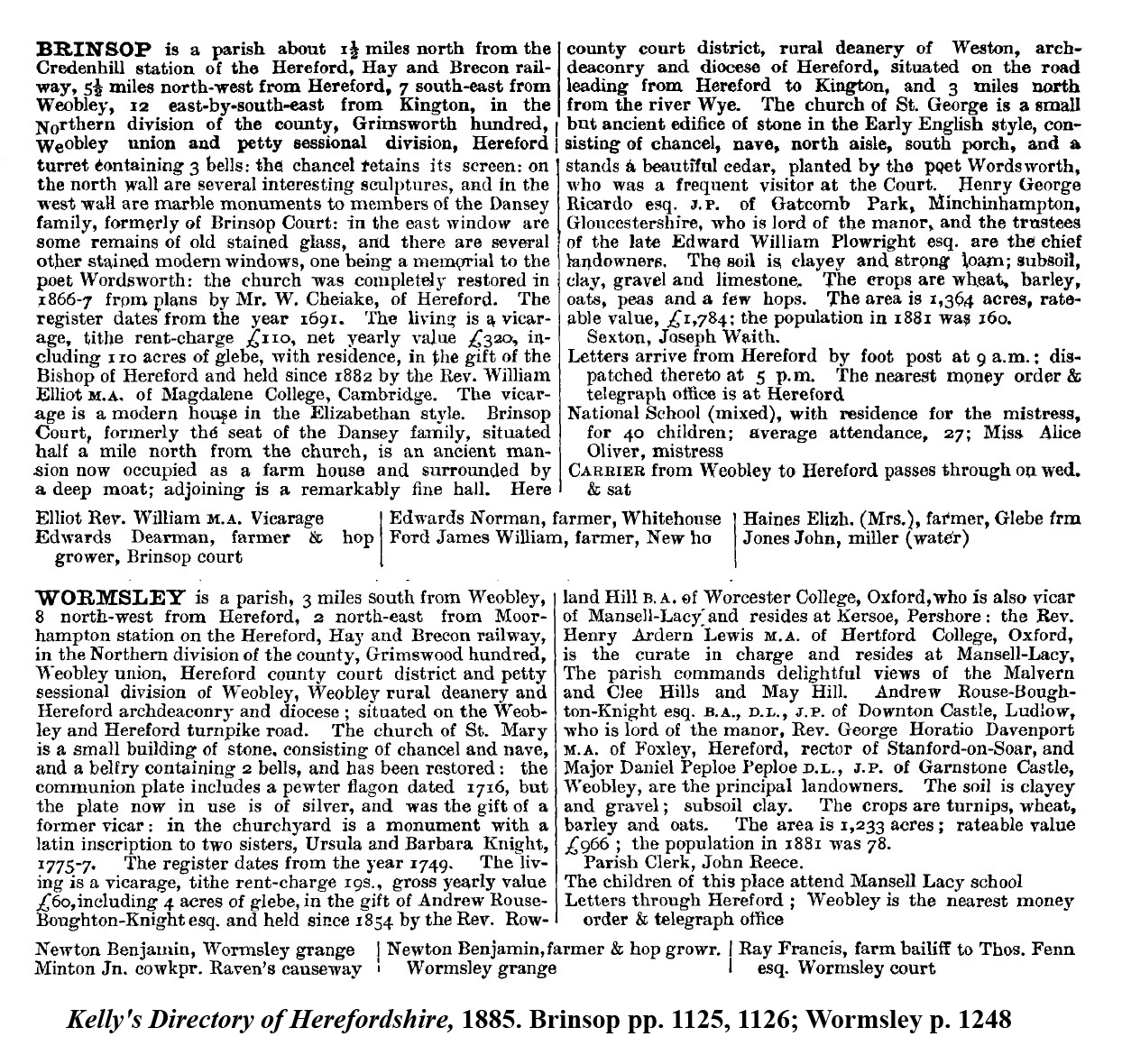
Brinsop and Wormsley in Kelly's Directory 1885

In the 1890s both parishes were part of the Moccas and Yazor polling district and electoral division of the county council, and in the Hereford county court district. Brinsop village was 4 miles (6 km) north from Credenhill railway station, and Wormsley 6 miles (10 km) north-east from Moorhampton railway station, both stations on the Hereford, Hay and Brecon section of the Midland railway. Brinsop population in 1871 was 152, and in 1881 was 160 in 26 inhabited houses containing 26 families or separate occupiers. Wormsley population in 1871 was 87, and in 1881 was 78 in 17 inhabited houses containing 17 families or separate occupiers. Brinsop population in 1891 was 120; Wormsley, 85. Both parish areas remained the same as in the previous decade, with wheat, barley, oats, beans, peas, and roots being grown in Brinsop, and turnip, wheat, barley, roots, oats and hops in Wormsley. One principal landowner and lord of the manor of Brinsop was Major (later Colonel, DSO) Henry George Ricardo (1860 - 1940) of Gatcombe Park, Minchinhampton, Gloucestershire, the great-grandson of the economist David Ricardo; while one of Wormsley was still Andrew Rouse-Boughton-Knight of Downton castle (Downton Hall) who was also the lord of the manor, churchwarden for St Mary's church, and the owner of Grange House (Wormsley Grange) farm, 1 mile (1.6 kilometres) north-east from St Mary's. The national school for boys and girls at Brinsop had increased its accommodation from 40 to 60, with an average attendance down from 27 to 17.; by 1895, average attendance had dropped further to 15. Children at Wormsley attended Brinsop school, and those at Mansel Lacy and King's Pyon. The carrier to Hereford still operated through Brinsop on Wednesday and Saturday, The nearest money order office was, by 1895, at Credenhilland, the nearest telegraph office at Burghill. Also by 1895, mail was being delivered by mail cart. Residents at Brinsop included the parish vicar, who was the prebendary of Cublington in Hereford Cathedral, the churchwarden, schoolmistress, three farmers, a miller, and a farm bailiff. Resident at Wormsley were the parish vicar, churchwarden and clerk, and four farmers, one of whom also grew hops, a cowkeeper and a farm bailiff.

Jakeman & Carver's Directory states the previous view that Wormsley "affords some delightful and extensive scenery, embracing the Malvern hills, in Worcestershire, and the Clee hills, in Shropshire", and gives a more contextual view of the Augustinian priory:

A priory of Augustinian, or "Black" canons, of the order of St. Victor—an expansion of a hermitage at Kings Pyon, dedicated to St Leonard de Pyona—was founded here early in the reign of Henry III, if not in that of John, his predecessor. Sir Walter de Map was lord of the manor in the time of Henry, and his son Nicholas changed his name to Wormesley, but by whom the priory was founded is uncertain. Gilbert Talbot, an ancestor of the Earl of Shrewsbury, gave lands to it in the time of Edward I., when the overthrow of the religious houses was in contemplation. The Earl of Shrewsbury requested that the priory might be restored to him, as his ancestors had contributed to the foundation, and many of them were buried within its precincts. But his petition was in vain, and the monastery was surrendered in January, 1536. The revenues at the time of the Dissolution were valued at £83 10s. 2d. per annum. The last prior, Roger Shelly, or Sheil, received a pension of £20. Walter Map, or Mapes, archdeacon of Oxford, and incumbent of Westbury in the Forest of Dean, was perhaps of the same family as the lord of Wormesley above mentioned, but at an earlier period. He was a person of great importance in the 12th century, and a special favourite of Henry H. He was the author of several satirical poems, especially one entitled Golias, in which he attacks the clergy in general, and especially the Cistercian monks, with some of whom, his neighbours at Flaxby abbey, he was often at variance. He was also author of a noble poem, entitled "An Address to the Priests of Christ."

The vicarage living at St George's Brinsop received a rent charge £107, augmented by a Queen Anne's Bounty of £87 yearly, under the patronage of the Lord Bishop of Hereford, with glebe land now increased 127 acres (51 hectares). The church had been completely restored in 1866–67 at a cost of nearly £900, and included a "beautifully carved oak reredos" which was added in 1872 at the expense of the parish vicar. During the restoration, over the south door was discovered a "nearly obliterated representation of our Saviour on the cross." Brinsop vicarage, built in 1840, is described as a "handsome and commodious residence." During the 1890s the chancel still retained its 15th-century screen. Mention is made of the chancel stained glass memorial window to William Wordsworth, with the inscription: "In memory of William Wordsworth, the Poet laureate, a frequent sojourner in this parish; the gift of some among the many admirers of his genius and character, A.D. 1873." With the stained glass memorial to William Wordsworth, was noted another window to Mary (Hutchinson) his wife, and to his daughter, and a further window to the political economist David Ricardo. It was stated at this time that the register dated to 1695. St Mary Wormesley, previously dilapidated, had been "beautifully restored" to seat 50, the chancel re-built, the floor laid with encaustic tiles bordered with stone paving, and a "handsome" stained window in the chancel. The bell-turret was described as "exceedingly beautiful of Early English architecture." In the churchyard were noted "several massive" granite monuments, with Latin inscriptions, one to two sisters, Ursula and Barbara Knight. The wall sculptures included one which represented St George and the Dragon. The plate included a pewter flagon, dated 1716, a silver communion plate of 1819, and a silver paten-cover, dated 1571. The register dated from the year 1749. The living, a perpetual curacy, was held by a vicar who was also vicar of King's Pyon, where he resided.

By 1913, Brinsop population was 135; Wormsley, 178. Brinsop school, now a mixed Public Elementary School which took some children from Wormsley, then accommodated 40 children, with an average attendance of 24. Residents at Brinsop included the parish vicar and sexton, a farmer, and the schoolmistress; those at Wormsley, three farmers and a cowkeeper. Brinsop's vicar, who lived in Brinsop was also perpetual curate of Wormsley. Sir Joseph Verdin, 1st Baronet (1838 – 1920) of Garnstone Castle, Weobley, was one of the major landowners of Wormsley. Carriers still operated, linking the parishes to Hereford.

== Geography ==
The civil parish of Brinsop and Wormsley is in west Herefordshire, and approximately 6 miles (10 km) north-west from the city and county town of Hereford. The parish, of a reversed 'C' footprint, is approximately 4 miles (6 km) from north to south, and approximately 2 miles (3 km) east to west at the north, and 1,400 yards (1,300 m) east to west at the south. Parish area is of approximately 2,664 acres (1,100 ha), and at an approximate height of 300 feet (90 m) above sea level at the south to 650 feet (200 m) at the north, with a significant rise in height at Merryhill in the central-west and Pole Wood in the north-west. Adjacent parishes are Yazor and Mansel Lacy at the west, Bishopstone at the south-west, Kenchester at the south, Credenhill, Burghill and Canon Pyon at the east, King's Pyon at the north and north-east, and Weobley at the north-west.

The parish is rural, of farm complexes, fields, managed woodland and coppices, streams, ponds, lakes, isolated and dispersed businesses and residential properties. It includes the largely depopulated village settlements of Brinsop (grid reference SO4420244790), at the south, and Wormsley (grid reference SO4276847788), at the north. Streams in Brinsop and Wormsley are part of the tributary feed for the Yazor Brook, which provides part of the parish southern boundary with Kenchester, then flowing to the River Wye, 1 mile (1.6 km) south from the parish. The principal stream rises at a lake (grid reference SO4376946554), between Wormsley and Brinsop, flows south past Brinsop Court, then to the east of Brinsop village, where it forms a series of lakes, and provides a partial border with the parish of Credenhill, before flowing into the Yazor Brook. Its altitude drops from 400 feet (120 m) to 250 feet (76 m). The only major road in the parish is the A480, which runs at the south of the parish and locally from Yazor at the west to Credenhill at the east. At the centre of the parish a minor road runs north, from the junction with the A480, through Brinsop village, to a junction with a further minor through-road from Burghill at the east, and north through Wormsley, where it becomes Raven's Causeway, to Weobley. All other routes are country lane dead ends and circuitous routes, bridleways, farm tracks, property entrances, and footpaths.

== Governance ==
Brinsop and Wormsley is part of the seven-council-member Foxley Group of Parish Councils, which also includes the parishes of Mansel Lacy and Yazor. The parish is part of the Northern Area Meeting Group of the Herefordshire Association of Local Councils.

As Herefordshire is a unitary authority—no district council between parish and county councils—the parish sends one councillor, representing the Weobley Ward, to Herefordshire County Council. Brinsop and Wormsley is represented in the UK parliament as part of the North Herefordshire constituency.

In 1974, the separate parishes of Brinsop and Wormsley became part of the now defunct Leominster District of the county of Hereford and Worcester, instituted under the Local Government Act 1972. In 2002 the now united Brinsop and Wormsley parish, with the parishes of Bishopstone, Bridge Sollers, King's Pyon, Byford, Canon Pyon, Dinmore, Mansell Gamage, Mansell Lacy, and Wellington and Yazor, was reassessed as part of Wormsley Ridge Ward which elected one councillor to Herefordshire district council.

== Community ==
Parish population in 2021 was 122.

Within the parish are two churches: St George's at Brinsop, and the redundant St Mary's at Wormsley. There are no shops within the parish, the nearest at Credenhill just outside the parish at the south-east, and in Weobley at 1 mile north from the north of the parish. Close to the church at Brinsop is a business providing holiday cottages, and another, interior design services. East from the church at Wormsley, on Raven's Causeway (road), is Herefordshire Golf Club, and farther east, country house rental at the listed Wormsley Grange. Between the hamlets of Wormsley and Brinsop, is Brinsop Court event venue, with a geographically associated glamping site, a holiday cottage, and a tree house holiday home.

One bus route runs from Hereford to Tillington Common just outside the parish at the east, with a turnaround at Brinsop Turn within the parish. A further Hereford to Llandrindod, Wales route, through the parish but not stopping, stops on the A480 road at Mansel Lacy and Credenhill at the south. The closest rail connection is at Hereford 5.5 miles (9 km) to the south-east, on the Crewe to Newport Welsh Marches Line. The nearest major hospital is Hereford County Hospital at Hereford. The nearest local doctors' surgery is at Credenhill.

== Landmarks ==
Within the parish are two Grade I, one Grade II* and 20 Grade II listed buildings, including two churches, churchyard monuments, houses, farmhouses, a granary, barns, outbuildings, a bridge, and a garden wall.

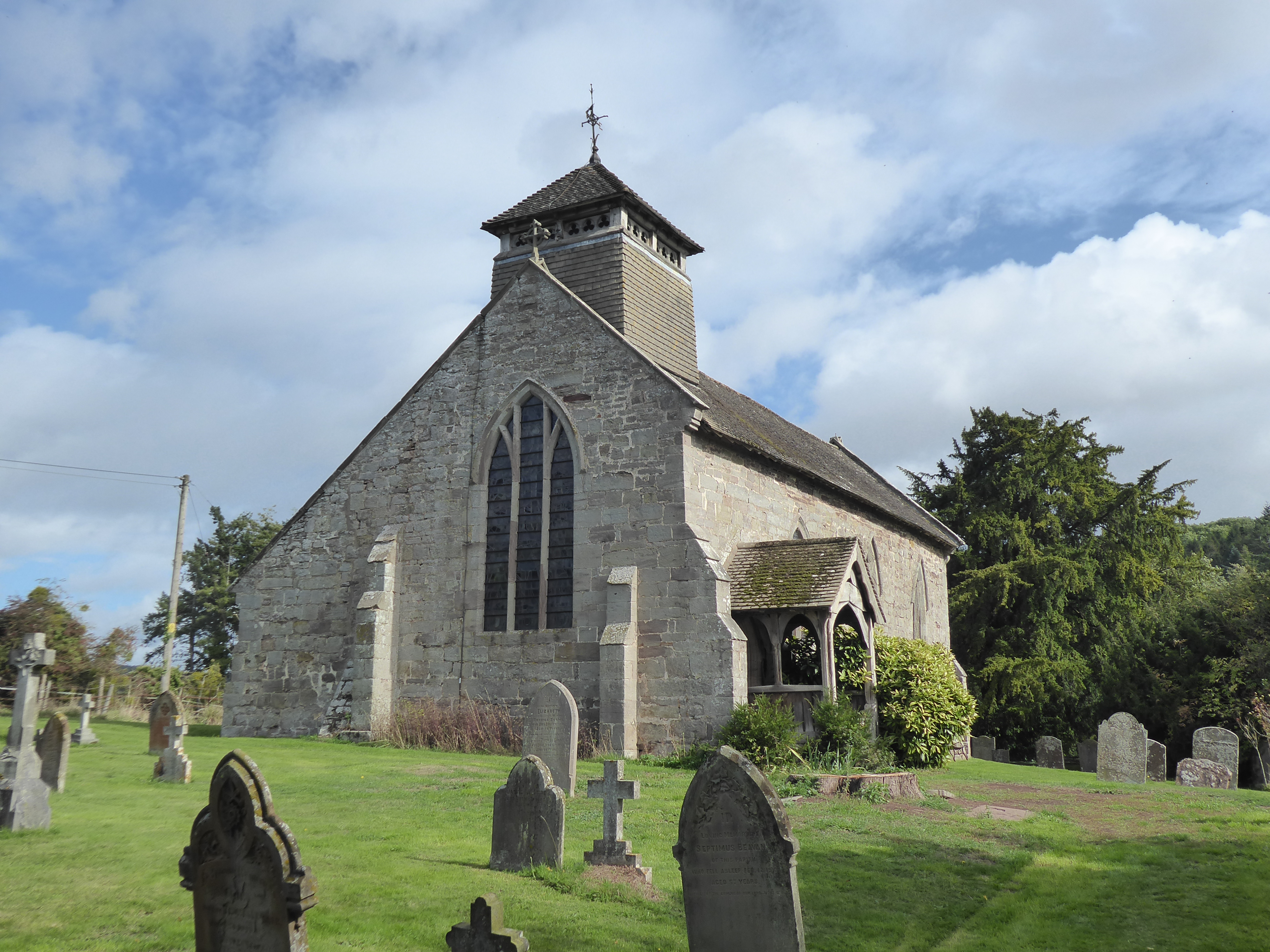
St George's church

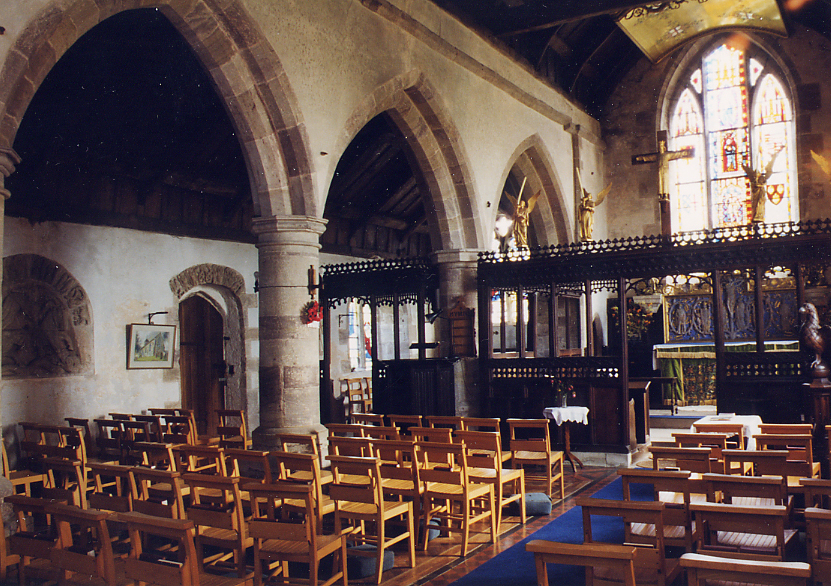
St George's church interior

St George's (grid reference SO4422844790), is a Grade I church in Brinsop, dating to the 12th century, altered in the 13th and 14th, restored first in 1866–67, and then by Ninian Comper in 1919. Of sandstone construction, it comprises a three-bay nave with bellcote at the west, a one-bay chancel, a north aisle, a north vestry, and a south porch. The roof slopes in one line to incorporate the chancel and nave at the south, and the chancel and nave and aisle at the north, the whole roof of an unbroken and continuous-line gabled range. Just off-centre to the south on the north elevation projects the late 19th- or early 20th-century vestry. Either side of the vestry is a window: three-light with ogee-heads to the south, two light to the north. Two windows are at the east: the north aisle window of two lights with quatrefoil heads, the chancel east window of three pointed lights, the outer lights stepped down and lancet; buttresses flank either side of the chancel window, and embedded in the wall between the chancel and aisle rises a chimney from a lean-to building against the aisle. Windows date to the 14th century, except that in the north of the vestry, which is "modern". The south elevation comprises the porch, at the left, and three twin-light windows with Y-tracery to the right, two to the nave and one to the chancel. The wood porch on stone plinth, "perhaps 15th century", has been restored, its wicket gates from the late 18th or early 19th century. The arched doorway to the nave within the porch holds a 19th-century ledged door with strap hinges. The west window of the church is of similar construction to the chancel east window, and flanked by buttresses. The interior dimension of the nave is 34½ ft by 15¼ ft (10.5m by 4.65m); and the chancel, 16½ ft by 15¼ ft (5m by 4.65m); with the north aisle, 8½ ft (2.6m) wide. The nave and chancel roof (ceiling) is of continuous truss and rafter construction, as is the north aisle, and of the 16th century, with arch bracing "probably late 19th". Within the chancel is a recessed late 13th-century piscina, a recessed early 20th-century oak door in the north wall, and a reredos dated 1931 dedicated to Hubert Delaval Astley and Richard Vincent Sutton. Between the chancel and the nave is a restored 14th- or early 15th-century rood screen, panelled below, open above and topped with a latticed cornice with foliated and cusped tracery, on which is a central Crucifixion and two probably gilded bronze angels, perhaps of St George and St Martin, each side. The screen carries across into the north aisle, and a similar screen in the chancel north bay demarcates the chancel from the north aisle chapel. On the north wall of the north aisle is a c.1160 tympanum depicting Saint George and the Dragon, and over the north door, a carved frieze with a "Sagittarius, angels, human figures (perhaps apostles), beasts and conventional foliage". Within the nave is a late 12th- or early 13th-century font, and against the west wall, are early 13th-century coffin lids with carved patterning. On the south wall is a marble monuments to William Dansey (died 1708), "flanked by Composite pilasters with entablatures, curved cornice, drapery, cherubs with shields-of-arms, urns and achievement-of-arms". A further monument is to Lady Doughlas Dudley (died 1642), wife to Cap. William Dansey. A panel wall monument in the vestry is to Catherine (died 1704), wife to William Dansey. Mason marks are on the nave north arcade. Stained glass in the chancel east window depicts Saint George.

The second Grade I building is Brinsop Court (grid reference SO4458845782), a manor-house dating to the 14th century with later alterations and additions. Built around a quadrangle, it is a mix of sandstone ashlar, and timber framing with rough-cast infill, and of two storeys and attic, with stone tiled roof and brick chimney stacks. A rectangular moat surrounds the house, crossed by a stone bridge near south-west corner, a replacement for a previous drawbridge. In the 13th and 14th centuries the house belonged to the Tirrell family, after which the Daunsey (Dansey) family held it until 1820.

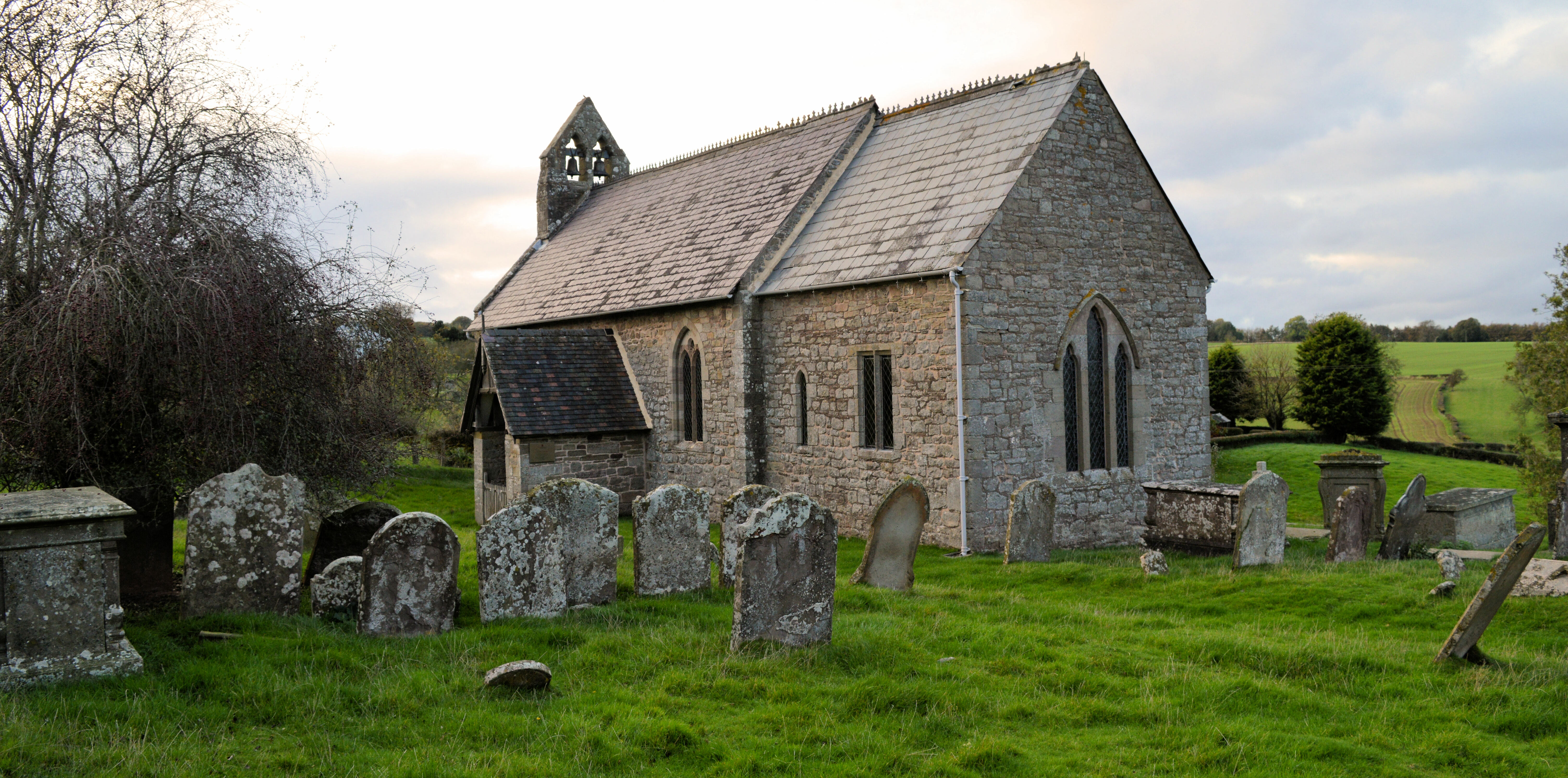
St Mary's church

St Mary's church at Wormsley (grid reference SO4275247793) is Grade II* redundant parish church put under the care of the Churches Conservation Trust in 1974. The church dates to the 12th century, altered later, and with a 19th-century chancel rebuild. Of sandstone with a Welsh slate roof, it comprises a 15½ ft by 13½ ft (4.7m by 4.1m) two-bay chancel, a 37 ft by 15 ft (11.3m by 4.6m) three-bay nave, with a double bellcote, and south porch. Elements of the nave, particularly the south doorway and font, are 12th century, the rest, especially the chancel, dates to the 13th. On the interior north wall are memorials to two men who died in the First World War, one to Lt Thomas Andrew Greville Rouse-Boughton-Knight of Wormsley Grange, the other to Rifleman Edward Charlton a former gamekeeper on the Wormsley Estate. In the churchyard are early 19th-century table tombs to archaeologist Richard Payne Knight, and his brother, horticulturist Thomas Andrew Knight. Other tombs to the Knight family are to sisters Ursula (died 1777) and Barbara (died 1780). There is also a base to a churchyard medieval cross, probably 14th century.

Wormsley Grange (grid reference SO4343448585), is an early 18th-century house with later alterations, of sandstone, rectangular footprint of approximately 50 ft (15m) by 50 ft, with tiled roofs on twin parallel gable-ended ranges. It is of three storeys with attics and cellars, with, at the south side, attached and stepped back at right angles, a two-storey 50 ft by 24 ft (7m) service wing. Windows are sash, and the east side ground floor set in a two-bay wide bay window, each side of the central entrance which leads to a double terrace garden. Born to Rev. Thomas Knight at Wormsley Grange were the brothers Richard Payne Knight, who rebuilt Downton Castle, and Thomas Andrew Knight, the horticulturalist and botanist, both buried in St Mary's churchyard. Following the 1820s the house became occupied by farmers. At 200 yards (183 m) east from Wormsley Grange is the site of small terraces, banks and fish-ponds of Wormsley Priory, otherwise the Priory of St Leonard de Pyon (grid reference SO4361048450), indicated by a series of imprecisely defined sunken earthworks and enclosures. Further fishponds at 200 yards south-southwest of the Grange (grid reference SO4338448398), may or may not be part of the priory. Wormsley Priory was founded in the reign of King John or King Henry III by a Gilbert Talbot, for the Canons Regular of the Augustine Victorine Order.

White House Farmhouse (grid reference SO4378944683), 500 yards (460 m) west-southwest of St George's church, is part of a group of listed buildings and cottages dating to at least the 17th century, possibly earlier to the 15th, but with later alterations, surrounded by 2 acres of gardens and incorporating a medieval fishpond. Centred around the farmhouse are what were before conversion, a cider house, a bake house, and a wainhouse (wagon or cart shed). The farmhouse is timber-framed underneath a partial later 18th-century facing of brick. In the 1980s the building complex became a pub with time-share accommodation, in 2005 restored as a private dwelling.

In Kenchester (grid reference SO4344541955), 1,000 yards (900 m) south from the parish southern border, and on the River Wye, is the National Trust property of The Weir Garden, a 10-acre (4 hectare) south facing garden which attracts a variety of birds, insects and butterflies.

Credenhill Camp (grid reference SO4507044772), 900 yards (800 m) east from St George's church, and within the Woodland Trust's Credenhill Park Wood, is the remains of a bivallate (defined by two concentric earthworks), late Iron Age, hill fort and scheduled Monument. The inner bank rises up to 40 feet (12 m), the outer up to 13 feet (4 m). Remains of timber granaries, Romano-British pottery shards, and storage pits were excavated in 1963.
