= Foxley, Herefordshire =

Rural estate in Herefordshire, England

Coordinates: 52.1145°N 2.8580°W

Foxley
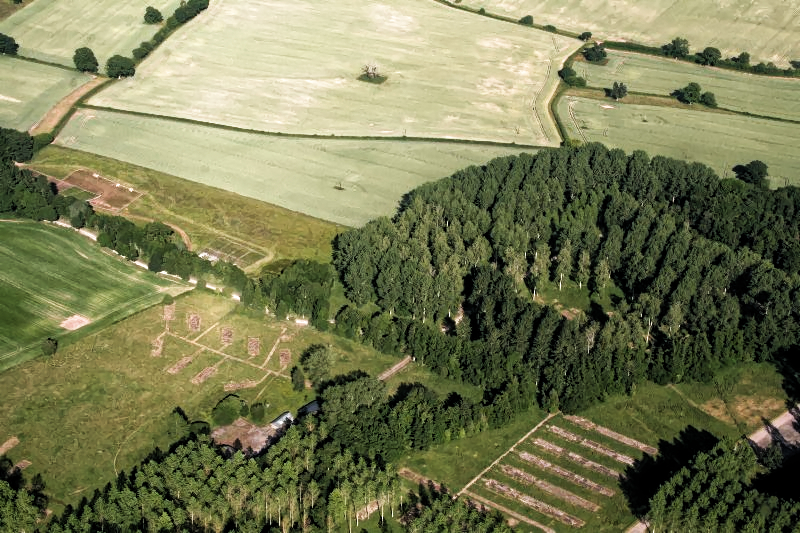
- Foxley estate showing Second World War groundworks

- Location within Herefordshire
- OS grid reference: SO4134346594
  - London: 125 mi (201 km) SE
- Unitary authority: Herefordshire
- Ceremonial county: Herefordshire
- Region: West Midlands
- Country: England
- Sovereign state: United Kingdom
- Post town: Hereford
- Postcode district: HR4
- Dialling code: 01981
- Police: West Mercia
- Fire: Hereford and Worcester
- Ambulance: West Midlands
- UK Parliament: North Herefordshire

Foxley is a rural estate, and the former Foxley Manor country seat, in Herefordshire, England. The Manor is associated with the judicial, political, artistic and later ennobled Price family, and became the site of the Second World War Foxley Camp.

Foxley estate, approximately 7 miles (11 km) north-west from the city and county town of Hereford, is mostly in the civil parish of Yazor, with the south-east part in Mansel Lacy, while also extending into parts of the parishes of Brinsop and Wormsley and Weobley. At the south-east border of Yazor parish, the former Foxley Manor house (SO4138046599), was centred on a 1 mile (1.6 km) radius between the village of Mansel Lacy at the south-east, and the largely depopulated settlements of Yazor at the west, Yarsop at the north-west, and Wormsley at the north-east.

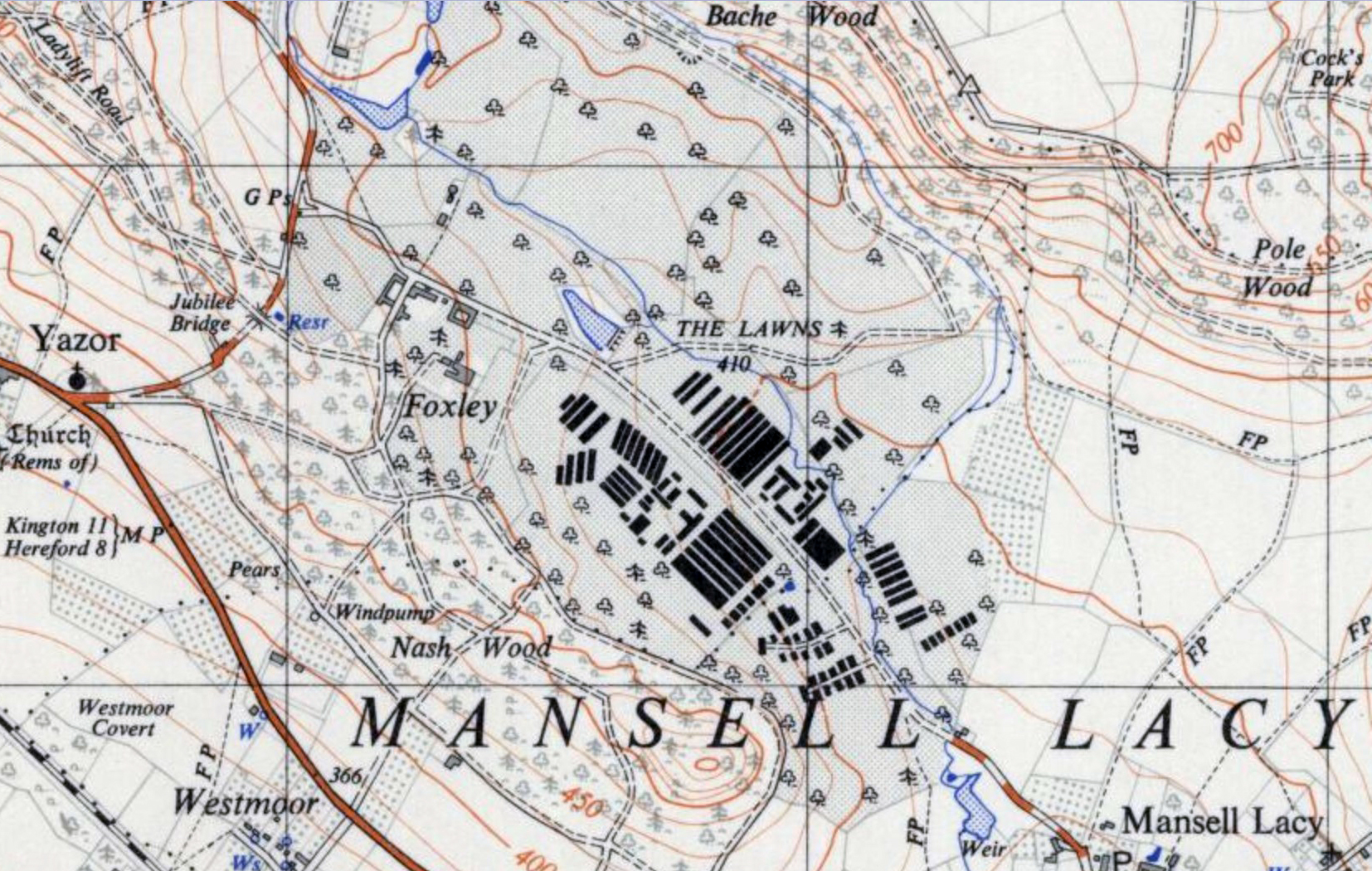
Foxley Manor and Camp pre 1948

The estate is within a south-east to north-west aligned horseshoe valley (alternatively named Yarsop Valley), of 1,600 yards (1,500 m) long by 1,300 yards (1,200 m) wide, with its main entrance in Mansel Lacy. The valley bottom rises from approximately 340 feet (104 m) above mean sea level at the south-east, to 510 feet (155 m) at the Foxley Manor (remains of) north-west end. Through the estate flows a stream, interrupted by seven c.1800 or earlier man-made lakes and ponds, starting at Yarsop, entering the valley at the north, and with largely wooded margins, flowing at the north and parallel to the main valley road, past a 240 feet (73 m) by 100 feet (30 m) pond (SO4158946686), between the stream and the Foxley Manor site, then flowing at the north around the remains of the Camp, past the site of an old saw mill (SO4204546416), before passing out of the estate to lakes and ponds in Mansel Lacy village. The sides of the valley are wooded, at the south-west by Nash Wood which rises to 610 feet (190 m), and north-east by Bache Wood, rising to 790 feet (240 m). Through the valley bottom runs a road, the former processional way from the estate entrance at Mansel Lacy village, north-west to the country house and ancillary buildings of the Manor, and beyond to the estate border at a junction with the minor road running south from Yarsop at the north to the A480 road at St Mary the Virgin's church in Yazor. Opposite St Mary's (SO4066046538), is the 1887-built gatehoused north-west road to the rear of the previous Foxley Manor house, which also links to a network of woodland bridle paths within the south-west Nash Wood. From the valley road, chiefly running north-east, are access roads and tracks to remaining estate and residential buildings and, bordering both sides of the road (SO4185046420), are concrete stands indicating the position of wartime Foxley Camp structures. Between these and Bache Wood at the north is the area previously designated "The Lawns" (SO4203446660), now converted to coppicing and arable use.

Significant extant buildings of Foxley estate include the former 1860s stable block set around a courtyard 70 yards (64 m) north from the Foxley Manor remains. The stable block itself incorporates, on the south side, a c.1700 Grade II listed dovecot (SO4132946698). The two-storey dovecot dates to c.1700, but with 1868 alterations. Of octagonal-plan, it is of brick on a sandstone plinth, with a "tiled roof and wooden tiled lantern", with its entrance and principal side facing north-east into the stable block courtyard. The interior at the time of listing contained "many nesting holes and ledges". At 500 yards (460 m) south from the stable block, and in Nash Wood, is the listed Ragged Castle (SO4132846236), a trapezoidal-plan gazebo dating to 1743, with a restoration in 1975. The folly structure contains two flights of stairs and a roof with battlemented parapets. It was built to provide panoramic views, and as a memorial to the Davenport family. The gatehouse, Yazor Lodge, at the head of the drive opposite St Mary's church on the A480 was built to plans by William Chick (1829-1892), of Hereford in 1872.

== History ==
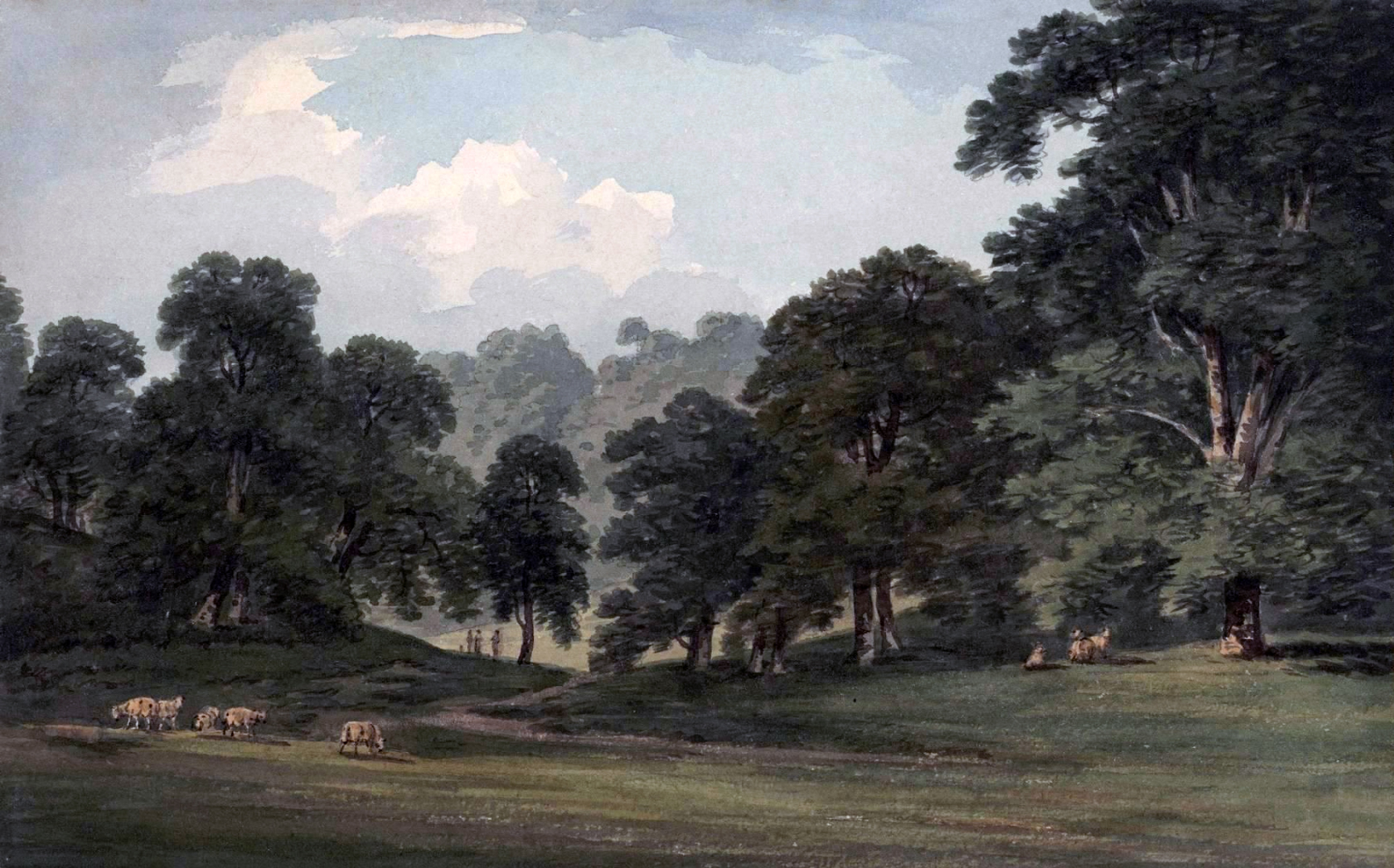
The valley of Foxley Manor by John Warwick Smith

Foxley is derived from the Old English and refers to a "fox wood", or a "woodland clearing frequented by foxes".

At the time of Domesday, Foxley, in the Herefordshire hundred of Stepleset, was within the purview of the manors and lands of Yarsop and Yazor, both in 1086 under the lordship of Robert of Baskerville, himself under Roger de Lacy, the tenant-in-chief to king William I.

Historically, Foxley Manor and estate was the principal seat at Yazor, and covered a wider area than today's valley estate. During, and perhaps before, the reign of Henry III in the 13th century, the manor of Foxley, and Yazor, was held with the manor of Weobley by the Baskerville family of Eardisley Castle. In 1166, the first year in the reign of John, Ralph de Baskerville, with the approval of the king, had handed the advowson and tithes of the parish and manor to the Welsh Llanthony Priory. The manor remained in the control of the Priory until the 16th-century suppression of the monasteries by Henry VIII. Following this, Yazor, with Foxley, was purchased from the crown by Hugh Welsh (the mayor of Hereford in 1531), and through his daughter, Elizabeth, Yazor passed to Thomas Smyth of Credenhill, succeeded by Hugh Smyth who was styled "of Foxley". By a 1646 purchase, Yazor and Foxley was transferred to James Rodd of Hereford (c.1572–1667), the eventual heiress of the family being Lucy, daughter to Robert Rodd (1637–1681) of Foxley, and Ann Sophia, only child to Thomas Neale of Warnford, Hampshire. Robert Rodd was son to Thomas Rodd (1608–1673) "of Morton Jeffreys", and his wife Anne Whitney (1614-1657). Lucy Rodd married Robert Price (1653–1733) of Giler in Cerrigydrudion, Denbighshire, whereby Foxley came into the hands of the Price family.

Robert Price, the husband of Lucy (Rodd) from 1679, later became Attorney General for South Wales, an alderman of the city of Hereford, a recorder of Radnor, steward to Catherine of Braganza, the town clerk of Gloucester, the King's Counsel for Ludlow, MP for Weobley, Baron of the Exchequer under Queen Anne, and a justice of the Court of Common Pleas. It was this Robert Price, in 1717, who first laid out plans for a mansion at Foxley, which was built between 1719 and 1730 to designs by Francis Smith of Warwick. After his death at Kensington in 1733, Robert Price was buried at Yazor. As his first son had died, his younger son, Uvedale Tomkins Price (1685–1764), MP for Weobley and lawyer, inherited Foxley. Uvedale was succeeded by Robert Price (1717–1761), who was instrumental in expanding the Foxley estate through purchases and exchanges and after 1757, eschewing ideas of formal garden and English landscape garden design, developed the property in line with contemporary natural landscape ideas of the romantic and picturesque, this inspired by his 1738 to 1740 Grand Tour of Italy and Switzerland. On this tour he was met by William Windham, son to Ashe Windham of Felbrigg, and his tutor Benjamin Stillingfleet (1702–71), the Norfolk naturalist and classical scholar. All three studied natural history and botany at Geneva, explored glaciers in Savoy, and made pictorial studies of their tour. One study by Price was later engraved by Windham, and was "apparently the first ever made" of the Mer de Glace. After Price married the sister to Lord Barrington in 1746, Stillingfleet was persuaded by the couple to live at a cottage on the Foxley estate, he "undertook botanical research and together with Price made excursions to seek out Picturesque scenery". While at Foxley, Price and Stillingfleet wrote a musical treatise, translated Linnaeus, "published a treatise on husbandry with observations on grasses, later republished with illustrations by Price", and made study tours of the Wye valley and the mountains of North Wales. The musician and watercolourist John Malchair began visiting Foxley in 1757, where he was influenced by Price's drawings; he carried on visiting Foxley after Price's death. Robert Price passed on his picturesque theories on landscape to his son Uvedale Price.

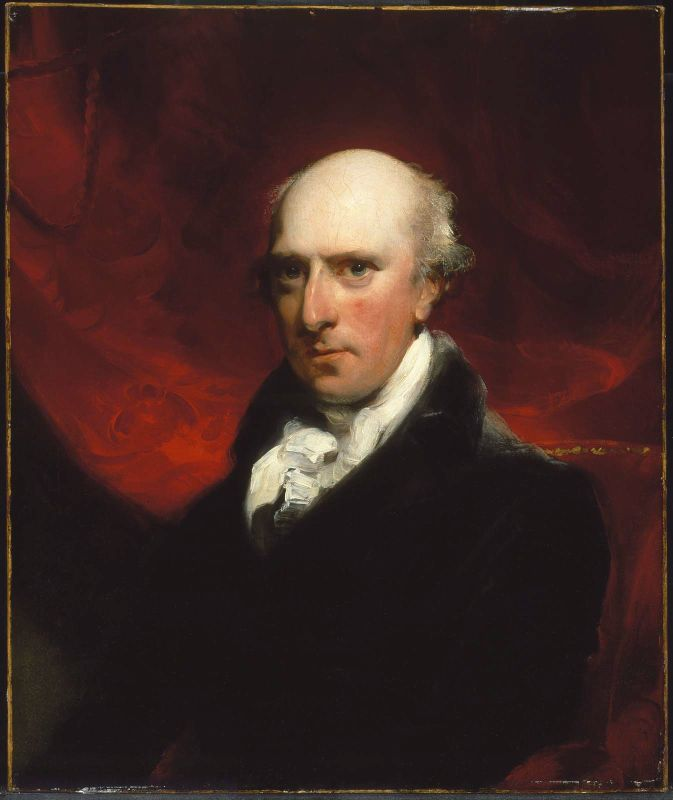
Sir Uvedale Price (1747–1829)

Uvedale Price (1747–1829), son to Robert Price, educated at Eton and Christ Church, Oxford, continued to develop and alter the Foxley estate under the influence of his father's picturesque theories. Kim Sloan, a curator at the British Museum, states that Uvedale Price was as important an exponent of the picturesque as Richard Payne Knight, his close neighbour at Downton Castle, and the artist and cleric William Gilpin. Like his father he undertook the Grand Tour in 1768, including Switzerland. He inherited Foxley while on tour, extended the estate with lands at Mansel Lacy, Yazor and Ladylift (Lady Lift Clump, north-west from Foxley, SO3965947907), and continued its picturesque development, including his father's extension of the valley upper slope woodland plantations of oaks, chestnuts, ashes, beeches and larches, through which were six to seven miles of rides, suitable for walking and carriages, and tree management to provide and improve extensive vistas and intimate views. The castellated Ragged Castle bellevue folly in Nash Wood, which was built around 1743 by his father Robert Price, was enlarged by Uvedale Price. Foxley was described as "The noble and extensive domain... with the manors and advowsons, one of the most influential and important residential estates in the country...". His work and views were described in his three editions of An Essay on the Picturesque (1794, 1796 and 1810), a Dialogue on the distinct Characters of the Picturesque and the Beautiful (1801), Sir Uvedale Price on the Picturesque (1842), and in the 1822 edition of John Claudius Loudon's Encyclopædia of Gardening. Uvedale Price, who was High Sheriff of Herefordshire in 1793, was an acquaintance of William Wordsworth and friends with Charles James Fox and Sir George Beaumont. Sir Thomas Lawrence painted portraits of Price, and Sir Joshua Reynolds painted his wife, Lady Caroline (Carpenter), who was daughter to George Carpenter, 1st Earl of Tyrconnel. He was created a baronet in 1828, and died in 1829 aged 82. During the time of Uvedale price, the house of Foxley Manor was described as "suitable for a large establishment and family of wealth and distinction", and included an inner hall, dining room, billiard room, library, study, a suite of grand rooms, a drawing room, breakfast room, bedrooms, dressing rooms, servants quarters, and housekeeper and butler rooms. The estate contained more than three farmhouses, and water mill for corn, blacksmith and wheelwright shops, and workers' cottages. Parts of the estate had begun to be mortgaged by 1818.

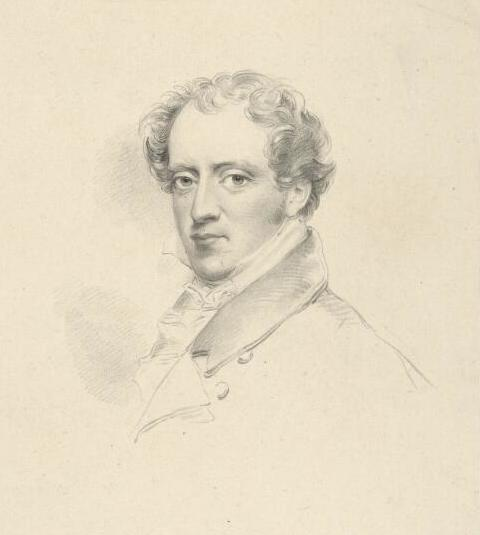
Robert Price (1786–1857)

Sir Robert Price, 2nd Baronet (1786–1857), son to Sir Uvedale and Lady Caroline Carpenter, daughter to George Carpenter, 1st Earl of Tyrconnel, inherited the Foxley estate at the death of his father in 1829. He was the sole landowner at Yazor, and responsible for the gift of the parish vicarage living, was MP for Herefordshire from 1818 until 1841, and Hereford from 1845, and invested in coal and iron, particularly ironworks at Tondu, Bridgend. The investments eventually led to near bankruptcy; subsequently he was bought out in 1854. Heavily in debt, Robert Price put up the estate for sale in 1855, and on his death in 1857 the baronetcy became extinct. He predeceased his wife, Mary Anne Elizabeth, daughter to Rev. Dr. Robert Price, Canon of Salisbury and Prebendary of Durham, who died in 1878.

In 1855 the Foxley estate was mortgaged to Earl Fitzwilliam, and then purchased in 1856 by John Davenport, of Westwood in Staffordshire, son to the industrialist and porcelain manufacturer John Davenport. He rebuilt a transept in the parish church of St Mary as a mortuary chapel for the parish and his family. John Davenport died in 1862, Foxley passing to his son, the Rev. George Horatio Davenport JP, sole landowner and lord of the manor, who rebuilt much of the house, improved and renovated estate buildings. The parish living was in his gift, while he being rector of Stanford on Soar in Nottinghamshire. In 1866 George Horatio Davenport married Miss Dashwood of Stanford Hall, Loughborough; the day was celebrated on the Foxley estate as a holiday with entertainments which included the band of the Herefordshire Militia. The marriage is commemorated by a William Warrington stained glass window, in the apse of St Mary's church, funded partly by the Foxley estate tenantry. At the time the Foxley estate is described as in a "high state of cultivation", the mansion as commanding "some beautiful views over the vale of Hereford, the distance being formed by various hills retiring in perspective, and the foreground by rich masses of wood". The house itself contained apartments which were mostly "elegantly fitted up, and decorated with a good collection of painting by the first masters". George Horatio Davenport died in 1919.

At the beginning of the Second World War the Foxley Manor estate was requisitioned to become a military camp for Canadian forces, including the First Battalion, 2nd Canadian Pioneers. In 1943 American forces were barracked, and built two general hospitals for war wounded. Foxley later served as a staging camp for D-Day troops. The concrete block, brick, timber, and asbestos camp buildings and barrack blocks were built by the Canadians. Initially with no inside toilet facilities, these were provided in 1951 by Herefordshire County Council who had taken on responsibility for the site. After the War the camp became a centre for the Polish Resettlement Corps and their families, reuniting Polish refugees and demobbed servicemen through the British Red Cross. It was also used to house local people subjected to post-war housing shortage. The camp included a school, church, youth club, cinema, a gym, shop, library, and a shower block. A NAAFI café, and vans delivering fresh fruit and vegetables and soft drinks, visited weekly. The eventually dilapidated mansion was demolished in 1948, but the former mansion's 19th-century stable block survives. The camp buildings remained occupied until 1958, but were demolished in 1962.
