= Brinsop Court =

Grade I listed structure in Herefordshire, United Kingdom

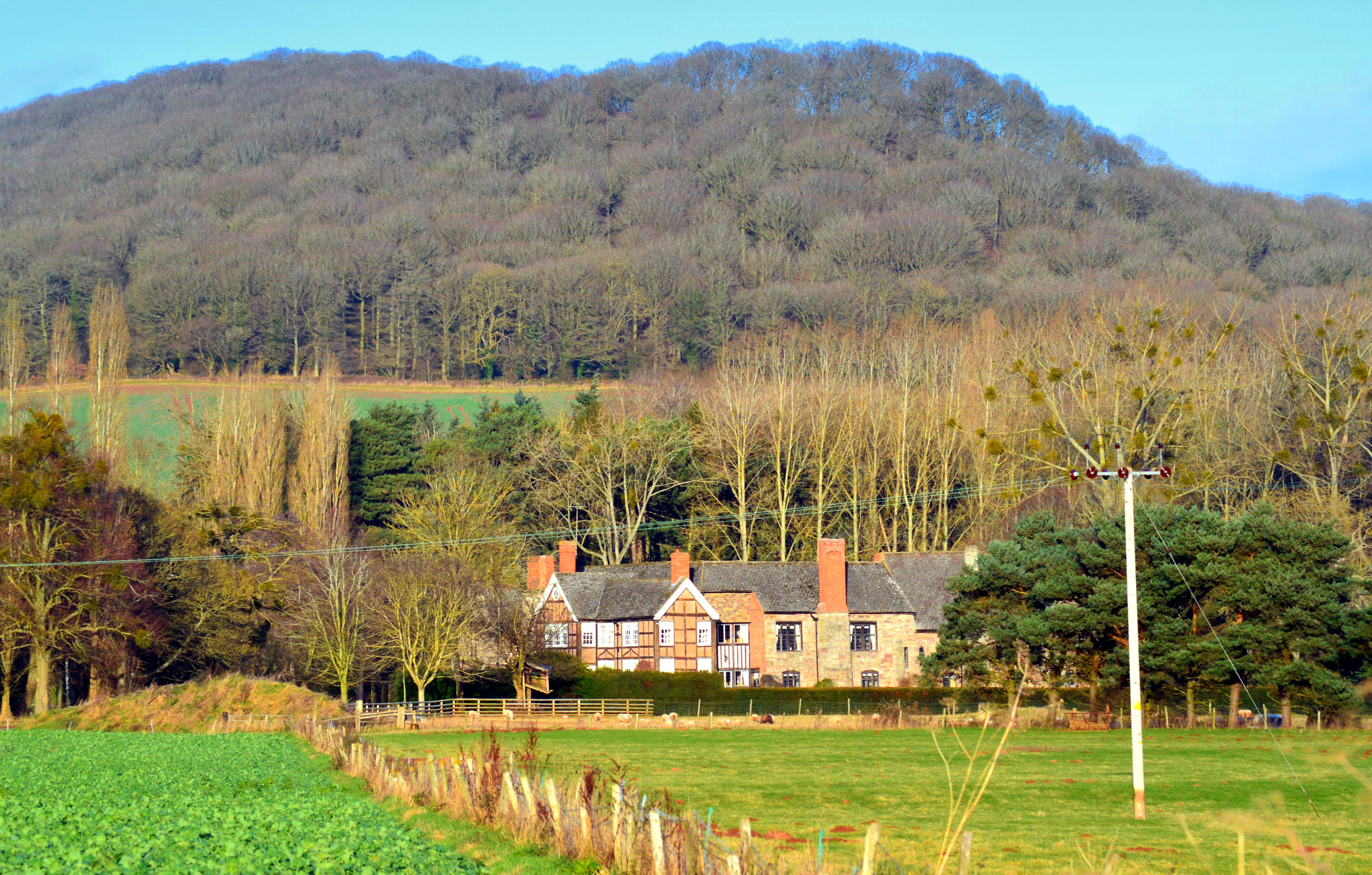
- Looking NE across fields toward the house

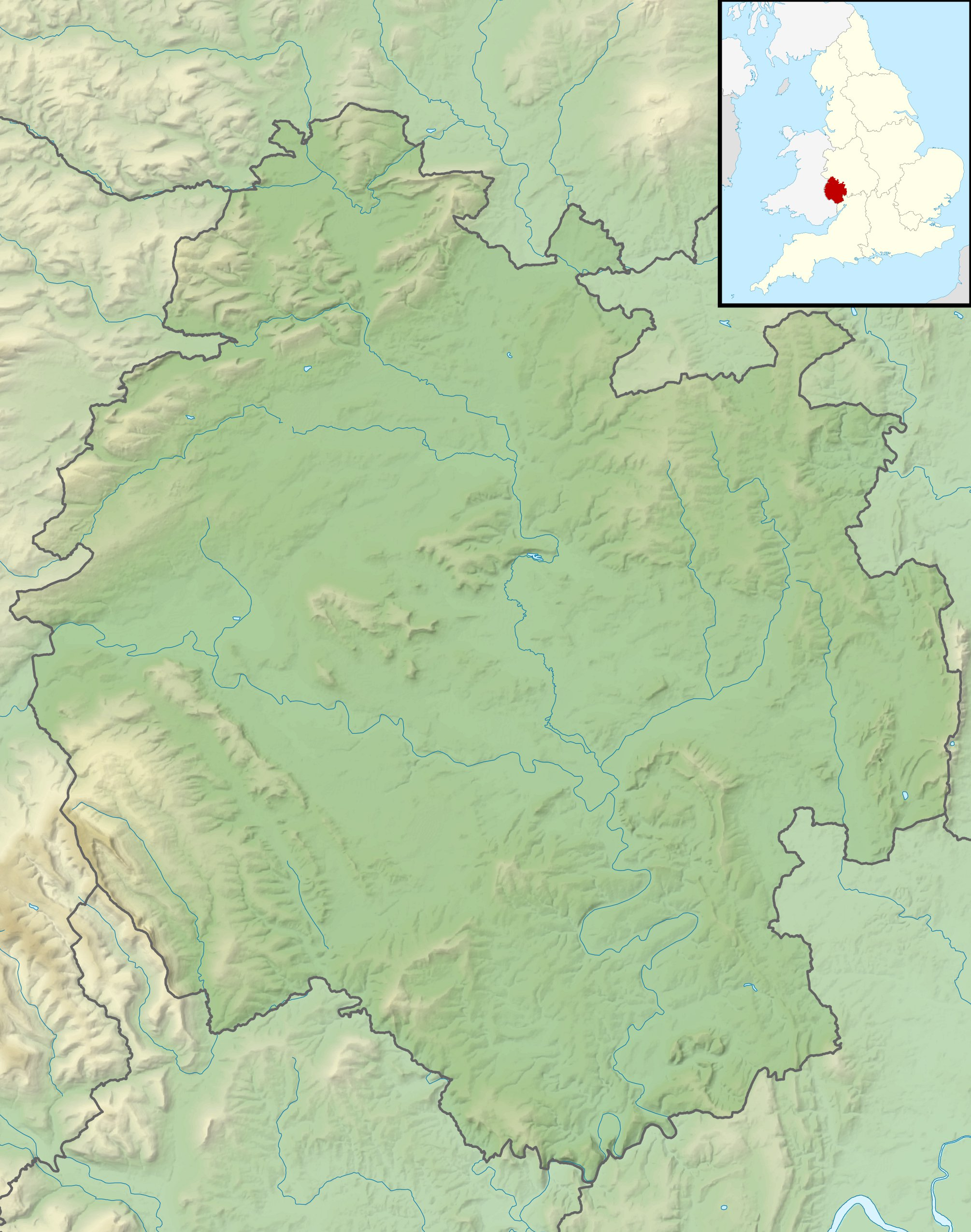
- Location within Herefordshire
- 52.1077°N 2.8103°W
- Type: House
- Location: Brinsop, Herefordshire

History
- Built: 14th, 16th and 17th centuries with extension in the 20th

Site notes
- Architect: Henry Avray Tipping - 20th century reconstruction
- Architectural style: Vernacular
- Owner: Privately owned

Listed Building – Grade I
- Official name: Brinsop Court
- Designated: 20 February 1953
- Reference no.: 1349793

Listed Building – Grade II
- Official name: Bridge south-west of Brinsop Court
- Designated: 9 February 1988
- Reference no.: 1081972

Brinsop Court, Brinsop, Herefordshire, England is a manor house dating from the 14th century. The house was much extended in the 16th and 17th centuries, and reconstructed in the early 20th century by Henry Avray Tipping. Brinsop contains many period features including fireplaces, ceilings and wooden panelling. The house is surrounded by lawns, encircled by a moat and stands within an 800-acre estate. It remains privately owned and is now primarily used as an events venue.

== History ==
The Old Court at Brinsop was built in the early fourteenth century by a local squire, and was grander than a similar manor across the county at Cheyney Longville, which was owned by a knight and member of parliament. An ancient manuscript mentions that

a moat round and approached by a drawbridge; within the quadrangle was a Chapel and a crypt beneath it, a dungeon and a blacksmith's forge. The Chapel, with the staircase leading to it, occupied one side of the square; it had a groined roof and walls painted in frescoes.... Two towers flanked the drawbridge, having grotesque figures on their tops - one being a monkey playing with a fiddle. In the inner court was a third tower, which though in a perfect state of preservation, was pulled down about fifty years ago to assist in building a wall round the stables.

The first historical mention of Brinsop post-dates the Credenhill Iron Age fort. Brinsop is also an affluent or minor tributary of the River Wye. Tradition records that at the time of medieval settlement of the land at Brinsop in around 1210 a knight called St George slayed a dragon on the spot where the church was founded. Ralph's son Ralph also lived at Brinsop and confirmed the charter grant. Sir Roger was knighted by Edward I for fighting against his enemies during the Welsh Wars from 1282 onwards. (Note: Joanna, daughter of Hugh Tyrell, and grand daughter of Sir Randall Tyrell married Owen St Owen of Tyrell Court. His coat of arms incorporates Tyrell differenced in the last quarter. The genealogy was uncovered in Duncumb's History of Herefordshire, and subsequently improved by latter day historians.) The third Ralph died without an heir, his sister therefore inheriting. She brought Brinsop in her dower to husband, Adam Lucas in 1305. In 1340 the King Edward III allowed a reversion charter to Ralph Tirell of 240 acres in fee for military service - de Domino Herberto filio Petri - a tenants of Lord Herbert.

It was mentioned in Edward Mogg's 16th edition of Paterson's Roads (1822), when it was owned by Dansey Richard Dansey. The Dansey family owned the house for 500 years before it died out in the early nineteenth century. The stained glass in the church celebrates a visit by Charles I to the house in 1645, which is confirmed by the differenced arms of the Danseys with the ducal families of Chandos, Talbot, and Baskerville. After the king's defeat the Danseys were compounded by parliament for £390. Their grandson, Colonel Richard Dansey was a soldier in Marlborough's campaigns fighting at the Battle of Almanza. The house was slighted to some extent, the remainder falling into ruins during the antiquarian period of the eighteenth century when it was the habit to loot the stone of ramshackle buildings.

In 1817 the house was purchased for £26,000 by the economist David Ricardo of Gatcombe Park, who was buying a number of estates at the time, not least Bromsberrow Place, situated above the Severn at the point where the three counties intersected. Ricardo leased Brinsop to Thomas Hutchinson, brother-in-law of William Wordsworth. Wordsworth visited the house from December 1827 to January 1828, and wrote three of his sonnets in that time. His sister, Dorothy Wordsworth, wrote of Brinsop Court that it was

no cheerless spot, and flowers in the hedges and blossoms in the numerous orchards will soon make it gay. Our fireside is enlivened by four fine, well-managed children, and cheerful friends; Mrs. Hutchinson is one of the most pleasing and excellent of women....

Hutchinson's sister Sara Hutchinson, a former lover of Samuel Taylor Coleridge, also stayed there with the friends. From 1845 Dearman Edwards occupied the building as a tenant farmer purchasing it at the end of his life in 1909, when it was sold.

From 1912 the house was owned by Hubert Delaval Astley and his wife the Lady Constance Sutton. Astley was a notable ornithologist and author of My Birds in Freedom and Captivity, a work of 1900 which is still in print. Lady Constance was a bibliophile who amassed a famous library at Brinsop. She was previously briefly married to Sir Richard Francis Sutton, one of the wealthiest commoners of the time and famed for racing his yacht Genesta for the America's Cup in 1885. He died in 1891 after just three years of marriage, aged 37 years. The Astleys commissioned Henry Avray Tipping to completely modernise the design of the place into a full square by adding the east wing which was completed in 1913. They upgraded the outbuildings and extended the gardens to a working farm. Hubert Astley died in 1925 and is buried in the churchyard at Brinsop. Captain Philip Astley MC inherited the estate and during the 1930s he brought his new wife, the actress and socialite Madeleine Carroll to live at the house, whose friends and guests included Noël Coward.

At the end of World War II the house was occupied by La Retraite school. After the Second World War Sir Derrick Bailey owned the house. Brinsop Court has been owned by Martin and Pat Churchward since 2005 and is now primarily an events venue.

== Architecture and description ==
Brinsop Court is a Grade I listed building. The bridge across the moat is listed Grade II.

== Arms ==
- Quarterly, 1 and 4, Barry wavy of six argent, and gules
- Dansey; 2 Azure, on a cross argent 5 escallops gules
- Cricketoft; 3 Or, three bars dancette gules
- Delamere

== Ancestry ==
Ancestors of Brinsop Court

32.William Dansey
16.Roger Dansey
33.Lady Douglas Dudley
8. William Dansey
34.
17. Ann Smyth
35.
4. Thomas Dansey of Brinsop & Little Hereford
36.
18. Edmund Colles of Hatfield
37.
9. Jane Colles
38.
19.
39.
2. John Daunsey of Brinsop
40.
20.
41.
10. John Scudamore of Hom Lacy
42.
21.
43.
5. Sybil Scudamore
44.
22.
45.
11.
46.
23.
47.
1. John Daunsey
48.
24.
49.
12.
50.
25.
51.
6. Nicholas Delamere of Woodhampton
52.
26.
53.
13.
54.
27.
55.
3. Jane Delamere
56.
28.
57.
14.
58.
29.
59.
7.
60.
30.
61.
15.
62.
31.

== Sources ==
- Brooks, Alan; Pevsner, Nikolaus (2012). Herefordshire. The Buildings of England. Yale University Press. ISBN 978-0-300-12575-7.
- Jenkins, Simon (2009). Britain's Thousand Best Churches. London.
- Robinson, Rev. S.J. (2001) [1872]. The Mansions and Manors of Herefordshire. London.
