= Brinsop =

Village in Herefordshire, England

Coordinates: 52°05′54″N 2°49′12″W

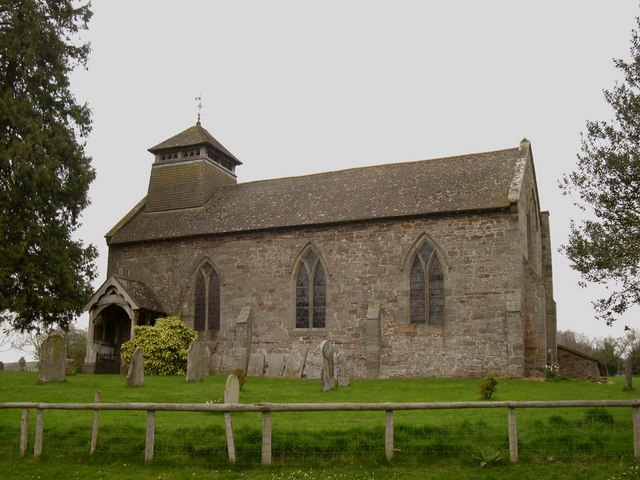
- St George's church

- Location within Herefordshire
- Civil parish: Brinsop and Wormsley
- Unitary authority: County of Herefordshire
- Ceremonial county: Herefordshire
- Region: West Midlands
- Country: England
- Sovereign state: United Kingdom

Brinsop is a village and former civil parish, now in the parish of Brinsop and Wormsley, in the county of Herefordshire, England. It is 6 miles north-west of Hereford. In 1961 the parish had a population of 111. On 1 April 1987 the parish was abolished and merged with Wormsley to form "Brinsop & Wormsley".

== St George's church ==
The early 14th-century St George's church is set in a wooded valley. Most of the redsand stonework has been looted, however the original carved tympanum dates from circa 1150–60, and depicts St George on horseback, a knight crusader slaying a serpent-dragon, typical Herefordshire motifs of fabulous or mythical creatures. It borrowed from Normandy for influences, probably Parthenay-le-Vieux, Poitou, but the voussoirs is similar to that at Shobdon within a sequence of zodiacal beasts.

There are two coffin lids with foliated crosses in the church. The church has a single nave and chancel with an arcade of two bays and double-chamfered arches have a date of c.1320, and two bays were added c. 1333–40. The north aisle was probably built after 1300 with Dec windows which have been isolated to date 1330–40, the church's original foundation was probably older. There are south facing windows with Y-tracery.

Medieval wall paintings of 1300 of the south wall showing the Feast of the Annunciation, the Visitation of the Angel Gabriel, and the Crucifixion of Christ are from early fourteenth century. The stoup is 15th century. The local medieval gentry were the Dansey family celebrated in the church; a tablet of William Dansey (d.1708) survives by Edward Stanton with large Corinthian pilasters and two putti. On the west wall is an even earlier stone inscription to William Dansey, 1628. More recent archaeological work has established that a medieval rampart existed to the south-east beyond the moat where a small pond was dug in 1969.

The bells were even more fascinating with unusual Latin markings dedicating to Saints Michael, John and Margaret. The church was restored by architect William Chick in 1866–67 in which the south porch and west bell tower were added. The roofs were also repaired. To the west of the house he altered a former school; which was housed in the Glebe House instead. South-western corner of the nave were done by Clayton & Bell in 1881, and the previous decade aisle improvements were completed. They included 14th-century stained glass in the tracery.

=== 20th-century alterations ===
In the 1920s Sir Ninian Comper improved the interior of the church by adding an alabaster reredos to separate nave from chancel adorned with the gilded angel figures of St George and St Martin. The chancel was restored in 1929, after the east window stained glass was finished in 1923, as too was a north transept chapel repair. A war memorial was also erected in 1920 but inside the chapel. In the graveyard Comper built a tomb in 1925 for Herbert Astley, the court's proprietor.

== Notes ==
=== References ===
Bibliography

- Brooks, Alan; Pevsner, Nikolaus (2012). The Buildings of England: Herefordshire. New Haven and London. ISBN 978-0-300-12575-7.
- Robinson, Rev.Charles J. (2001) [1872]. A History of the Mansions & Manors of Herefordshire. London. pp. 49–50.
- Salter, Mike (1998). The Old Parish Churches of Herefordshire. Malvern. ISBN 1-871731-32-1.
- Thorn, Frank; Thorn, Caroline (1983). Herefordshire. Domesday Book. Vol. 17. Chichester. p. 186a. ISBN 0-850334691.
