= St Mary the Virgin's Church, Yazor =

Coordinates: 52.1143°N 2.8690°W

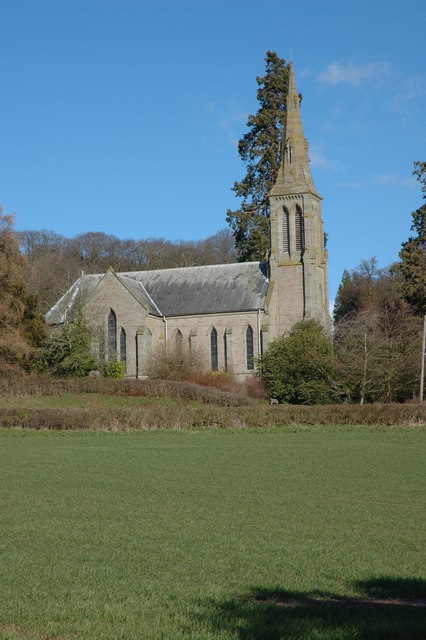
- St Mary the Virgin's Church, Yazor

- Location in Herefordshire
- Location: Yazor, Herefordshire
- Country: England
- Denomination: Anglican
- Website: Churches Conservation Trust

History
- Founder(s): Sir Uvedale Price; Sir Robert Price
- Dedication: Saint Mary the Virgin

Architecture
- Functional status: Redundant
- Heritage designation: Grade II
- Designated: 16 December 1986
- Architect(s): George Moore; Rev R. L. Freer
- Architectural type: Church
- Style: Gothic Revival
- Groundbreaking: 1843
- Completed: 1855
- Construction cost: £3,883 (equivalent to £360,000 in 2025)

Specifications
- Materials: Sandstone, Welsh slate roofs

St Mary the Virgin's Church is a redundant Anglican church in the village of Yazor, Herefordshire, England. It is recorded in the National Heritage List for England as a designated Grade II listed building, and is under the care of the Churches Conservation Trust.

== History ==
The church was built between 1843 and 1855. It was paid for by Sir Uvedale Price and his son Sir Robert Price. The church cost £3,883 (equivalent to £360,000 in 2025). Its main architect was George Moore, and the rector Rev R. L. Freer designed the spire and fittings inside the church. The church was built to replace an older church sited "a field away", whose churchyard contains the war grave of a Second World War Royal Artillery soldier.

== Architecture ==
=== Exterior ===
St Mary's is constructed in sandstone with Welsh slate roofs. Its plan is cruciform, with an apsidal chancel at the west end, and a tower at the east end containing a porch. The nave is in three bays, with single-bay north and south transepts. The tower is in two stages, with gabled buttresses. Its lower stage is "extremely tall". The upper stage contains two-lancet bell openings. Above these is a cornice supported on a corbel table, and an octagonal broach spire. On the spire are two tiers of lucarnes and a finial with a wrought iron cross. Fours steps lead to a doorway on the east side of the tower. On each side of the nave there are three lancet windows, and between them are buttresses. On the north and south sides of the transepts are three stepped lancet windows, and on the east sides are single blind lancets. On the west side of both transepts is a small porch, each of which contains a pair of rectangular windows. Under the windows of the north porch, a doorway leads down to a crypt. In the apse of the chancel are five lancet windows. On the apex of the chancel gable is an elaborate wrought iron cross in a circle. Along the sides of the porch in the base of the tower are stone benches.

=== Interior ===
The ceiling contains decorations including a pair of carved wooden angels, and a large boss above the chancel steps. There is much painting in the chancel, including the corbels, under which there are stripes in different colours. Around the chancel is a painted plaster dado which includes eight rows of rampant lions. Beneath each of the apse windows is a metal plaque; these contain inscriptions of the Magnificat, the Creed, the Ten Commandments, the Lord's Prayer, and the Nunc Dimittis. Above the central wall of the apse is a carved oak canopy. Between the nave and the transepts are carved oak screens. The walls of the nave are plastered but uncoloured. The pulpit is incorporated within the southern screen; it is polygonal and supported on a carved corbel. Above it is a tester decorated with the emblems of the Four Evangelists. The font probably dates from the 15th century, and consists of an octagonal bowl on an octagonal base.

The stained glass in the five windows of the apse is by William Warrington and dates from about 1845. The central window contains depictions of the Ascension, the Crucifixion, and the Resurrection. In the south window is the Annunciation and the Nativity, and the north window contains the Magi, and the scene of a miracle. The windows between them contain the emblems of the Four Evangelists. The stained glass in the transept windows dates from 1866 and consists of grisaille, blue squares and red triangles. The windows at the west end of the nave commemorate Foxley family weddings in 1866; that on the north side depicts Ruth, and the window on the south side shows the Marriage at Cana. Both windows were made by Heaton, Butler and Bayne. The memorials include monuments to Sir Uvedale Price, his son, Sir Robert, who died in 1857, and Rev Freer. The two-manual organ was made in 1845 by Gray and Davison, but when it was surveyed in 2000 it was unplayable.

== See also ==
- List of churches preserved by the Churches Conservation Trust in the English Midlands
