= Kersoe =

Hamlet in Worcestershire, England

Coordinates: 52.057795°N 2.010992°W

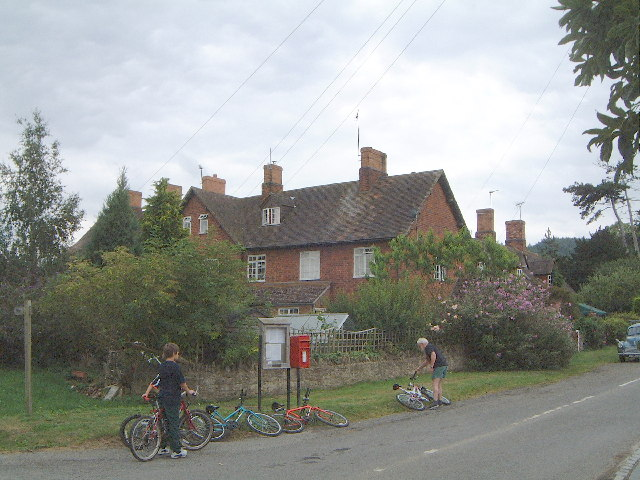
- Kersoe Barracks

- Location within Worcestershire
- OS grid reference: SO993399
- District: Wychavon
- Shire county: Worcestershire
- Region: West Midlands
- Country: England
- Sovereign state: United Kingdom
- Post town: PERSHORE
- Postcode district: WR10
- Police: West Mercia
- Fire: Hereford and Worcester
- Ambulance: West Midlands

Kersoe is a hamlet in Worcestershire, England. It is at the foot of Bredon Hill an area of outstanding natural beauty.
