= Kim Sloan =

Canadian art historian

Kim Sloan FSA

Academic background
- Education: University of Toronto, University College London

Academic work
- Discipline: Art History
- Institutions: Victoria and Albert Museum, British Museum
- Notable works: Enlightenment: Discovering the World in the Eighteenth Century

Dr Kim Sloan is a Canadian art historian.

== Career ==
Sloan worked for the Victoria and Albert Museum in 1986 where she curated an exhibition on Alexander Cozens from November 1986-January 1987. The exhibition then traveled to the Art Gallery of Ontario with additional works by his son John Robert Cozens and was on display January–March 1987.

In 1992, Sloan became the curator of British Drawings and Watercolours before 1880 at the British Museum. While at the British Museum, Sloan has worked primarily on Sir William Hamilton and his collections at the British Museum, the watercolours of J. M. W. Turner, and the Hans Sloane collections. From 2000, Sloan was the lead curator creating the new Enlightenment Gallery at the British Museum, which presents the history of the collection in the King's Library after the library collection moved to the British Library. The new gallery opened in 2003 and Sloan maintains curatorial responsibility for the Enlightenment Gallery.

From September 2007 - January 2008, Sloan was the Leverhulme Fellow at the National Portrait Gallery, London.

== Bibliography ==
- A Noble Art: Amateur Artists and Drawing Masters, C.1600-1800. British Museum Press, 2000, 256 pages.
