= Bridge Sollers =

Village and civil parish in Herefordshire, England

Coordinates: 52.077°N 2.858°W

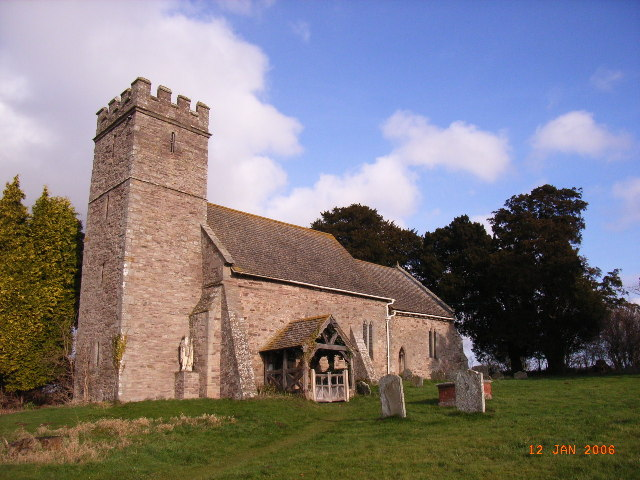
St Andrew's church

Bridge Sollers is a village and civil parish in Herefordshire, England, 10 km (6.2 mi) west of Hereford, on the River Wye.

The village consists of 12 households and has a 12th century parish church, St. Andrew's, which is a Grade I listed building.

Bridge Sollers takes its name from the surnames of a family connected with the parish: Simon de Brugge (b. 1272) married Mary Solers c.1297.

The first bridge was built at Bridge Sollers in 1896. Previously, there had been a ferry system for crossing the river, and the nearest bridge was at Hereford. This bridge was replaced in 2004.

Nelson Garage used to trade as a petrol station and garage, but has closed for business and is now a used car dealership.
