= Yazor =

Village in Herefordshire, England

Coordinates: 52.114°N 2.870°W

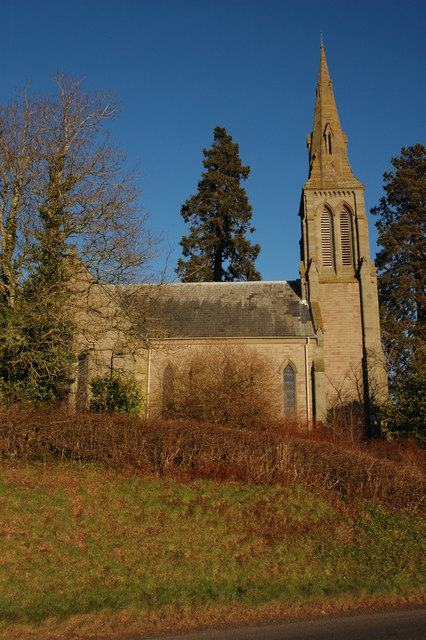
- Yazor church, dedicated to St Mary the Virgin

- Location within Herefordshire
- Population: 122
- Civil parish: Yazor
- Unitary authority: County of Herefordshire
- Ceremonial county: Herefordshire
- Region: West Midlands
- Country: England
- Sovereign state: United Kingdom
- Post town: Hereford
- Postcode district: HR4
- Dialling code: 01981
- Police: West Mercia
- Fire: Hereford and Worcester
- Ambulance: West Midlands
- UK Parliament: North Herefordshire

Yazor is a small village and civil parish in Herefordshire, England. The village is on the A480 road, approximately 8 miles (13 km) north-west of the city of Hereford, and about 1 mile (2 km) east of Offa's Dyke. Within the parish is the rural estate, former Price family country seat, and Second World War camp of Foxley, and the hamlet of Yarsop about 1 mile (2 km) to the north of the village. The population of the parish at the 2011 Census was 122.

== History ==
Yazor's Church of St Mary the Virgin is a redundant Anglican church, designated by English Heritage as a Grade II listed building, and is under the care of the Churches Conservation Trust. The Victorian building was constructed in 1843 by George Moore, and the Price family monuments were transferred to it. The three bay arcade is of 15th century origin, and the west tower from a century before. There was a south transept of one bay's width on the west aisle. To the south lie the ruins of Old Yazor church.

Yazor was formerly served by Moorhampton railway station located in the parish.
