= William Dansey =

English cleric and author

William Dansey (1792–1856), was a Church of England clergyman and author.

== Background ==
William Dansey, the son of John Dansey of Blandford Forum, Dorset, was born in 1792. He was educated at Sherborne and matriculated from Exeter College, Oxford, 4 July 1810. He was elected a Stapledon Scholar of his college 30 June 1811, but resigned the appointment in the following year. He proceeded BA 1814, MA 1817, and BMed in 1818.

He was ordained in 1819, nominated to the rectory of Donhead St. Andrew, Wiltshire, in 1820, and to a prebendal stall at Salisbury 10 August 1841, both of which he held until his death at Weymouth on 7 June 1856.

== Author ==
The Rev Dansey was the author of:

- Arrian on Coursing, a translation, 1831.
- A Brief Account of the Office of Dean Rural, by J. Priaulx, edited with notes, 1832.
- A Letter to the Archdeacon of Sarum on Ruri-Decanal Chapters, 1840.
- Horæ Decanicæ Rurales. Being an attempt to illustrate the name, title, and functions of Rural Deans, with remarks on the rise and fall of Rural Bishops, 1835, 2 volumes, 2nd edition 1844.

His name is still remembered in connection with his Horæ Decanicæ Rurales, a work which, while presenting to the antiquary a great deal of curious learning, furnishes to rural deans a useful guide to their official duties.

== Family ==
He married, 28 Aug. 1849, at Bathwick, Sarah, youngest daughter of the Rev. Richard White Blackmore, rector of Donhead St. Mary, Wiltshire.
