= St Francis Xavier Church, Hereford =

Coordinates: 52.0551°N 2.7169°W

St Francis Xavier Church
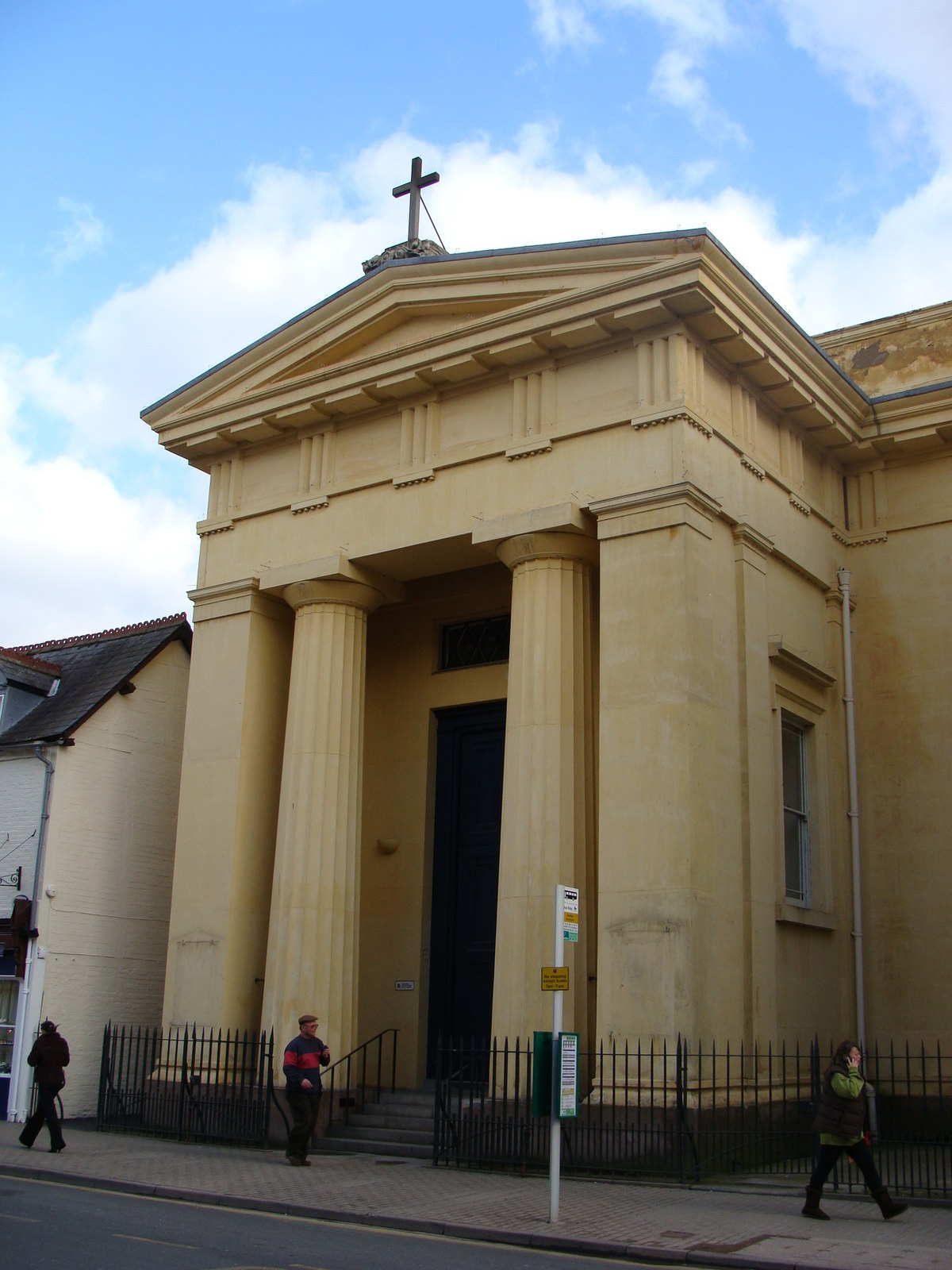
- Front entrance

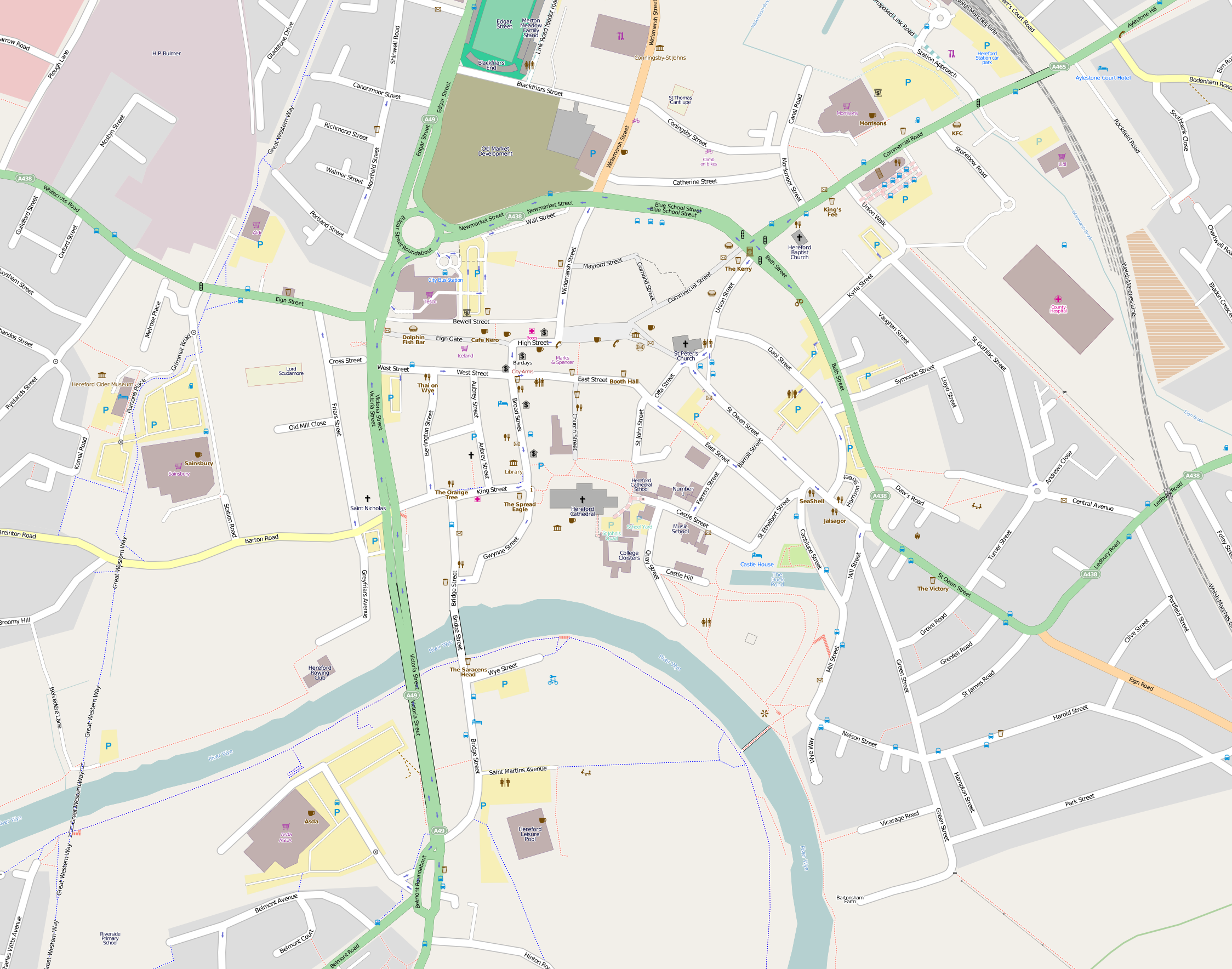
- Location in Hereford St Francis Xavier Church (Herefordshire)
- Location: Hereford
- Country: England
- Denomination: Roman Catholic
- Website: SFXHereford.org.uk

History
- Status: Parish church
- Founder: Society of Jesus
- Dedication: St Francis Xavier

Architecture
- Functional status: Active
- Heritage designation: Grade II* listed
- Architect: Charles Day
- Style: Neoclassical
- Groundbreaking: 19 September 1837
- Completed: 7 August 1839
- Construction cost: £16,000

Administration
- Province: Cardiff-Menevia
- Archdiocese: Cardiff-Menevia
- Deanery: Hereford

St Francis Xavier Church is a Roman Catholic Parish church in the city centre of Hereford, Herefordshire. The neoclassical-style church was built in 1839 and was designated a Grade II* listed building on 10 June 1952. It is in the Hereford Deanery of the Archdiocese of Cardiff-Menevia.

== History ==
The foundation stone of St Francis Xavier’s was laid 19 September 1837 and Queen Victoria sent her personal representative to the ceremony. The church was designed by Charles Day, an architect from Worcester, who also designed St Edmund's Church in Bury St Edmunds for the Jesuits. The building's construction cost over £16,000. It was opened on 7 August 1839, before the restoration of the English Catholic hierarchy in 1850, because of this, the church has no windows, fearing that any would be broken during the early 19th century. The church was built on the site of a chapel used by the Society of Jesus during the reformation, hence it was dedicated to St Francis Xavier, a Jesuit missionary from the 16th century who travelled to eastern and southern Asia. The Jesuits were in charge of the Catholic mission to Hereford from at least 1773 (when it was under the care of Dr John Butler, S.J.) to 1858. In 1858, the Benedictines created Belmont Abbey nearby. The church was handed over to them that year. It remained in their hands until 1954 when it was given over the Archdiocese of Cardiff. In 1992, administration of it reverted to the abbey.

The church contains a relic, the hand of St John Kemble a Catholic martyr, who was executed in nearby Widemarsh Common on 22 August 1679. He was beatified in 1929 by Pope Pius XI and canonized on 25 October 1970 by Pope Paul VI. His feast day is 22 August.

== Architecture ==
The exterior comprises columns and a frieze made of stucco. There is a dome at the back of the church. The front comprises two fluted Doric columns either side of the entrance. The interior is ornate with a decorated ceiling made of plaster. The church is lit by a lightwell. The altar is flanked by two Ionic columns.

== Parish ==
There are three Sunday Masses every week. One is on Saturday evening at 6:00pm, the other two are at 8:00am and 10:00am on Sunday morning.

The church also has a relationship with the nearby St Francis Xavier RC Primary School.

== See also ==
- Society of Jesus
