= Pembridge Castle =

Grade I listed castle in the United Kingdom

- Welsh Newton, Herefordshire, England
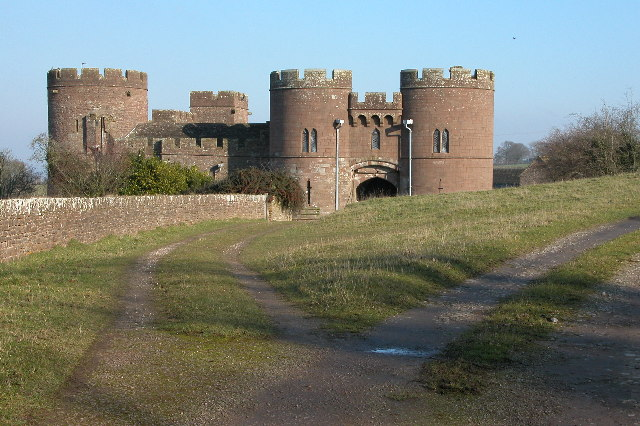
- Pembridge Castle

Site information
- Type: Bailey
- Owner: Private

Location
- Shown within Herefordshire
- Coordinates: 51.8698°N 2.7448°W
- Grid reference: grid reference SO488192

Site history
- Materials: Stone

Pembridge Castle, originally called Newland Castle, is a late 12th century to early 13th century Grade I listed former border castle located approximately 1 mile (1.6 km) northwest of Welsh Newton in Herefordshire, England.

It was most likely constructed by Matilda de St Valery sometime before 1208. It is over 40 km (25 mi) away from the actual village of Pembridge. Founded by 1208, it was the seat of the Pembridge family, then later the Wakes and Mortimer families in the 14th and 15th centuries. The chapel is 16th century and was ruined in 1644 during the English Civil War. Much reconstruction of the castle was undertaken in the early 20th century by a Dr Hedley Bartlett. It remains in private ownership.

The castle was granted to a lawyer from Abergavenny, David Baker of the Inner Temple, in September 1602. Baker left England to become a Catholic priest in 1605.

Saint John Kemble, an English Catholic priest and martyr, lived at the castle for many years, before his arrest and execution in 1679.

The castle sits on a 36 m x 27 m plot of land and is surrounded by a moat. It is constructed of ashlar, sandstone and rubble walls. The curtain wall surrounding the castle is 1.4 m thick. The earliest part of the castle, thought to be the keep, is the four story round tower on the western corner. The internal diameter of the tower is 7.5 m and the internal rooms of the tower are 5 m wide.

== See also ==
- Castles in Great Britain and Ireland
- List of castles in England
