= Widemarsh Common =

Public open space in Hereford, England

Coordinates: 52.064°N 2.722°W

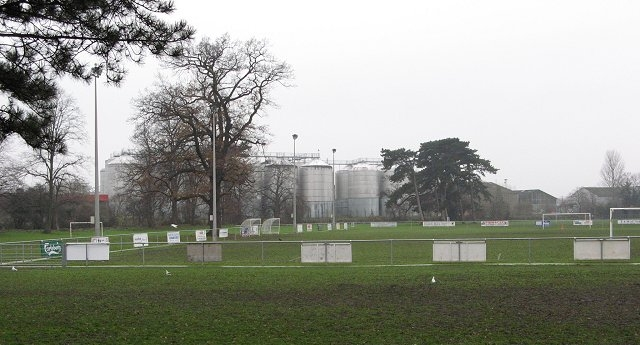
Widemarsh Common

Widemarsh Common is a public open space in Hereford. It is owned by Herefordshire Council and is used primarily as a recreational ground for both cricket and football. It is the home pitch for Hereford Lads Club Cricket Club.

It was once the location for local cider firm W.M.Evans & Co who were eventually bought by Bulmers. The location of the company premises is not entirely clear.

Saint John Kemble was hanged, drawn and quartered at the common on 22 August 1679.
