= Hereford Deanery =

The Herefordshire Deanery is a Roman Catholic deanery in the Archdiocese of Cardiff-Menevia, previously in the Archdiocese of Cardiff, that covers several churches in Hereford and the surrounding area.

The dean of Hereford is centred at Belmont Abbey.

== Churches ==
- Belmont Abbey, Hereford
- Our Lady Queen of Martyrs, Hereford – served from Belmont Abbey
- St Francis Xavier, Hereford
- The Most Holy Trinity, Ledbury
- St Ethelbert, Leominster
- St Joseph, Bromyard – served from Leominster
- St Thomas of Hereford, Weobley
- St Bede, Kington – served from Weobley

== Gallery ==
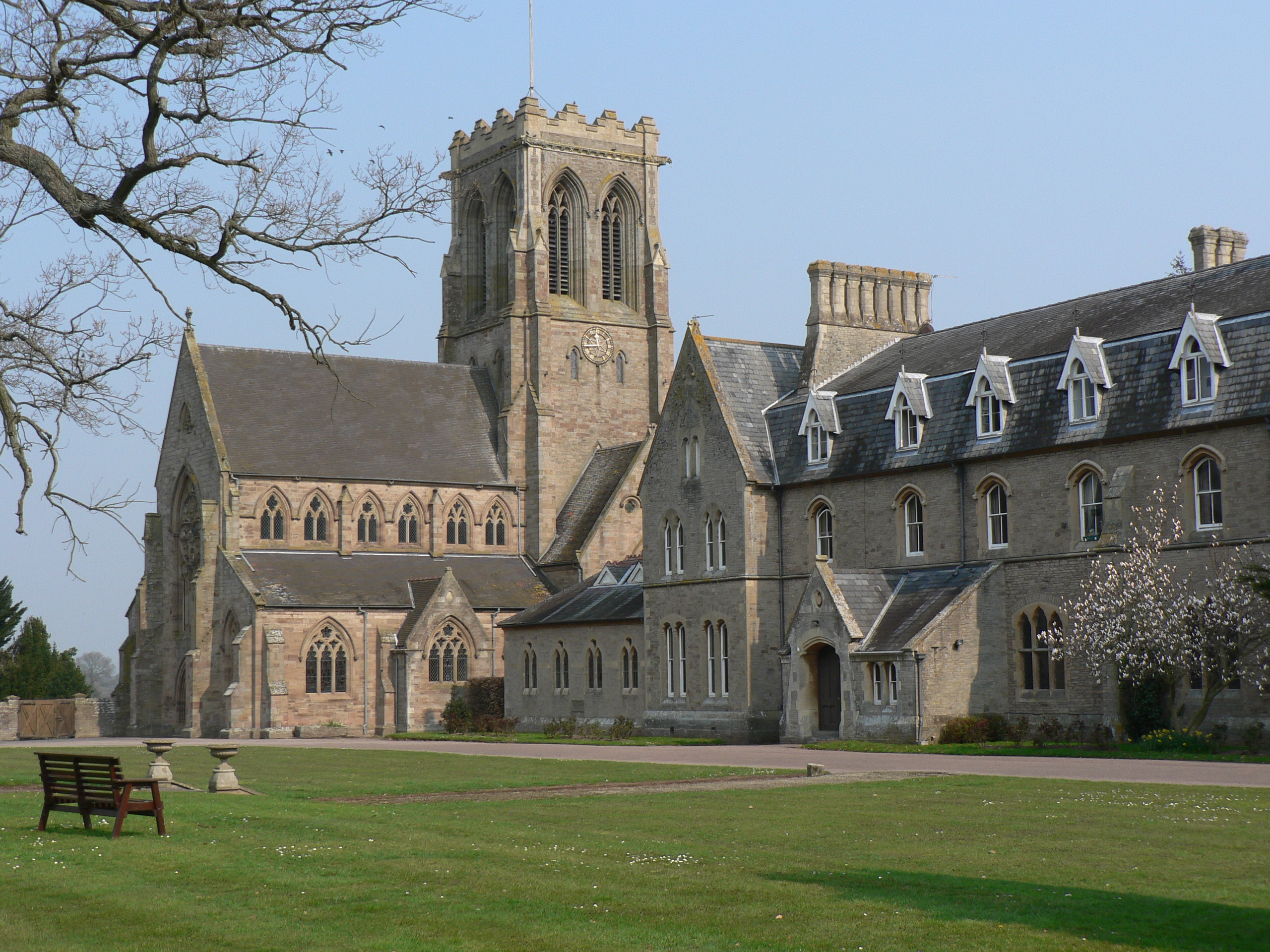
Belmont Abbey, Hereford

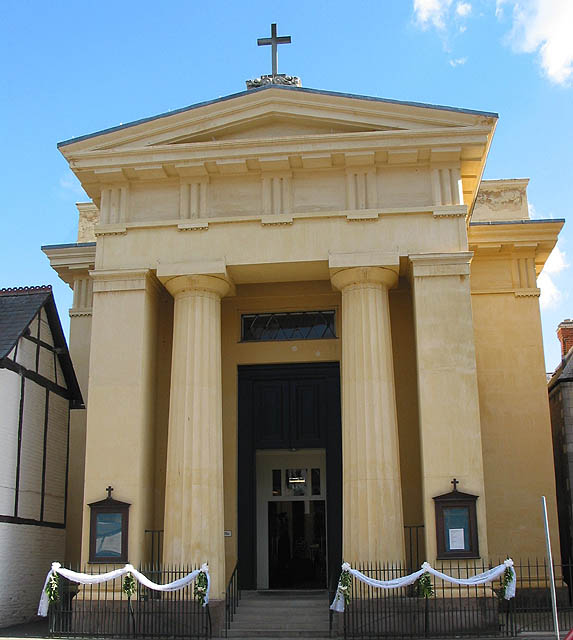
St Francis Xavier, Hereford

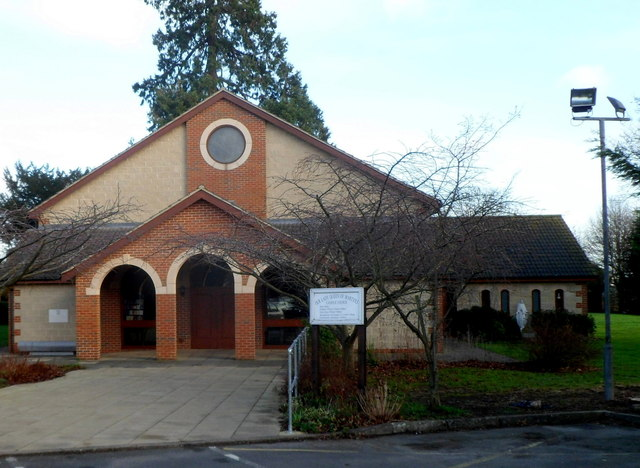
Our Lady Queen of Martyrs, Hereford

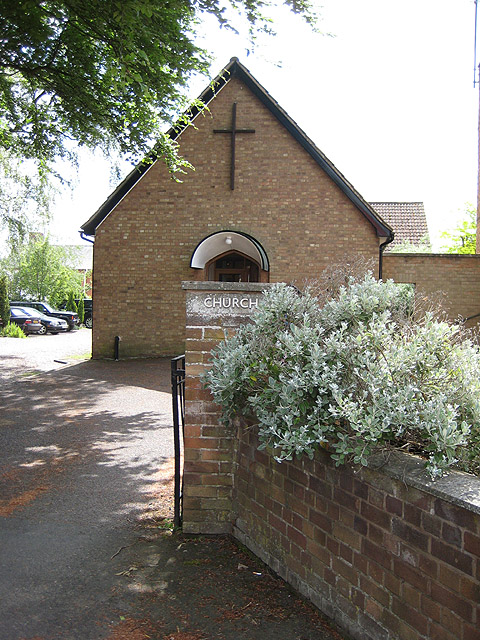
St Joseph, Bromyard

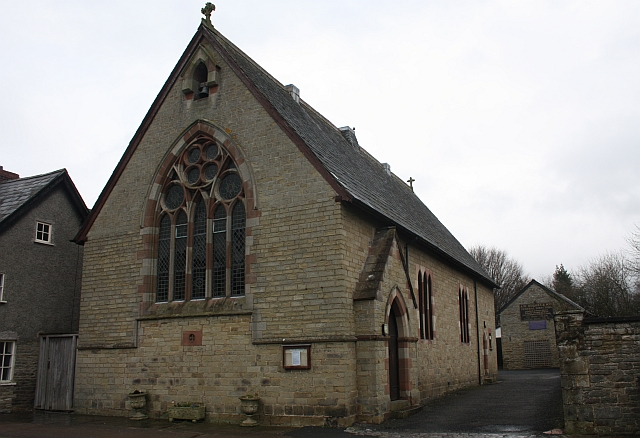
St Bede, Kington

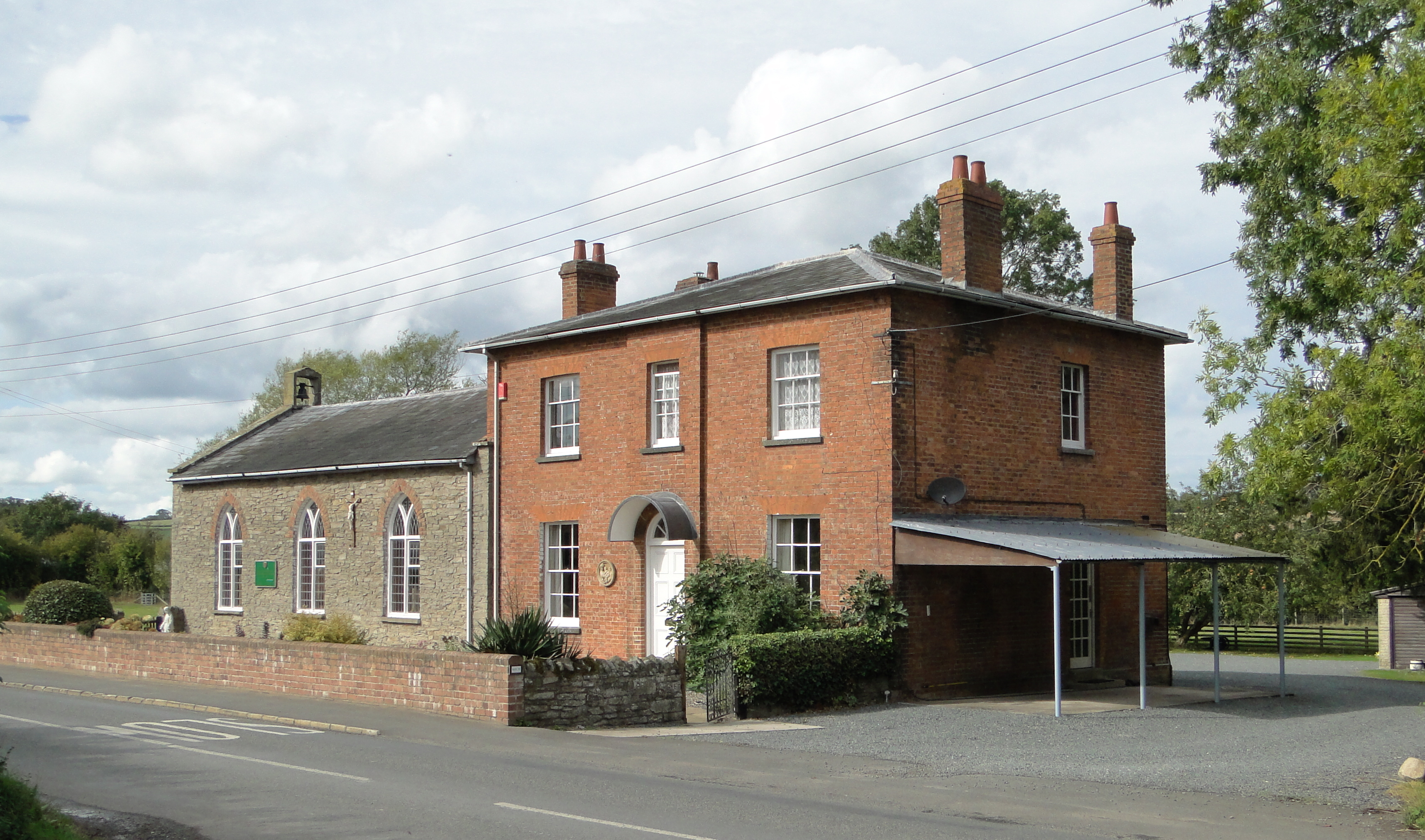
St Thomas of Hereford, Weobley
