= St Edmund's Church, Bury St Edmunds =

St Edmund's Church
- St Edmund King and Martyr Church; Bury St Edmunds
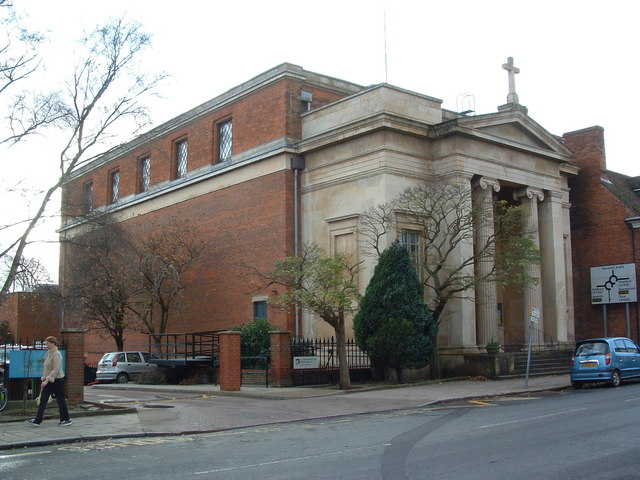
- Church entrance

- Location within Suffolk
- 52.2407°N 0.7131°E
- Location: Bury St Edmunds
- Country: England
- Denomination: Roman Catholic
- Website: StEdmundKM.org.uk

History
- Status: Parish church
- Founder: Society of Jesus
- Dedication: Edmund the Martyr

Architecture
- Functional status: Active
- Heritage designation: Grade II* listed
- Designated: 7 August 1952
- Architect: Charles Day
- Style: Classical Revival
- Completed: 1837

Administration
- Province: Westminster
- Diocese: East Anglia
- Deanery: Bury St Edmunds
- Parish: St Edmund's Church

St Edmund's Church is a Roman Catholic parish church in Bury St Edmunds, Suffolk. It was founded by the Jesuits in 1763 and the current church was built on that site in 1837. It is situated on Westgate street in the centre of the town. It is administered by the Diocese of East Anglia, in its Bury St Edmunds deanery. It is a Grade II* listed building.

== History ==
=== Foundation ===
In 1762, Fr Gage, a Jesuit, came to Bury St Edmunds to start a mission to serve the local Catholics of the area. Work on a small chapel dedicated to Our Lady of the Immaculate Conception started that year. It was completed a year later in 1763. The present church is on the site of the same chapel, so it is the oldest site of post-reformation Catholic worship in the Diocese of East Anglia.

=== Construction ===
By 1837, the size of the chapel was no longer sufficient for the expanding congregation. This led the Jesuits to ask the same architect who built St Francis Xavier Church in Hereford, Charles Day, to design a church for Bury St Edmunds. It was dedicated to St Edmund the Martyr, from whom Bury St Edmunds takes its name. The two churches, St Francis Xavier in Hereford and St Edmund's were both done in the same Grecian style and built in the same years.

=== Interior ===
Many of the features around the main entrance, came from nearby Rushbrooke Hall in 1959. Originally, the marble surround came from a fireplace there. In the westside of the side of a church is a Blessed sacrament chapel. This was consecrated in 1791, but fell into disuse until 1971 when it was re-dedicated. Also, in the north side of the church ware three blocked arches. These contain the gravestones of Jesuit priests who served the parish in the early 19th-century.

== Parish ==
The church has three Sunday Masses, two on Sunday morning at 08:30 and 10:30 and a Sunday evening Mass at 18:00. There are also weekday Masses interspersed throughout the week.

The parish has a close relationship with the nearby St Edmund's Catholic Primary School. The school was opened in 1882. In addition, the pupils join in with the Mass on Holy Days in the parish.

== See also ==
- Society of Jesus
- Diocese of East Anglia
