= John Kemble (martyr) =

English Roman Catholic saint

Saint John Kemble
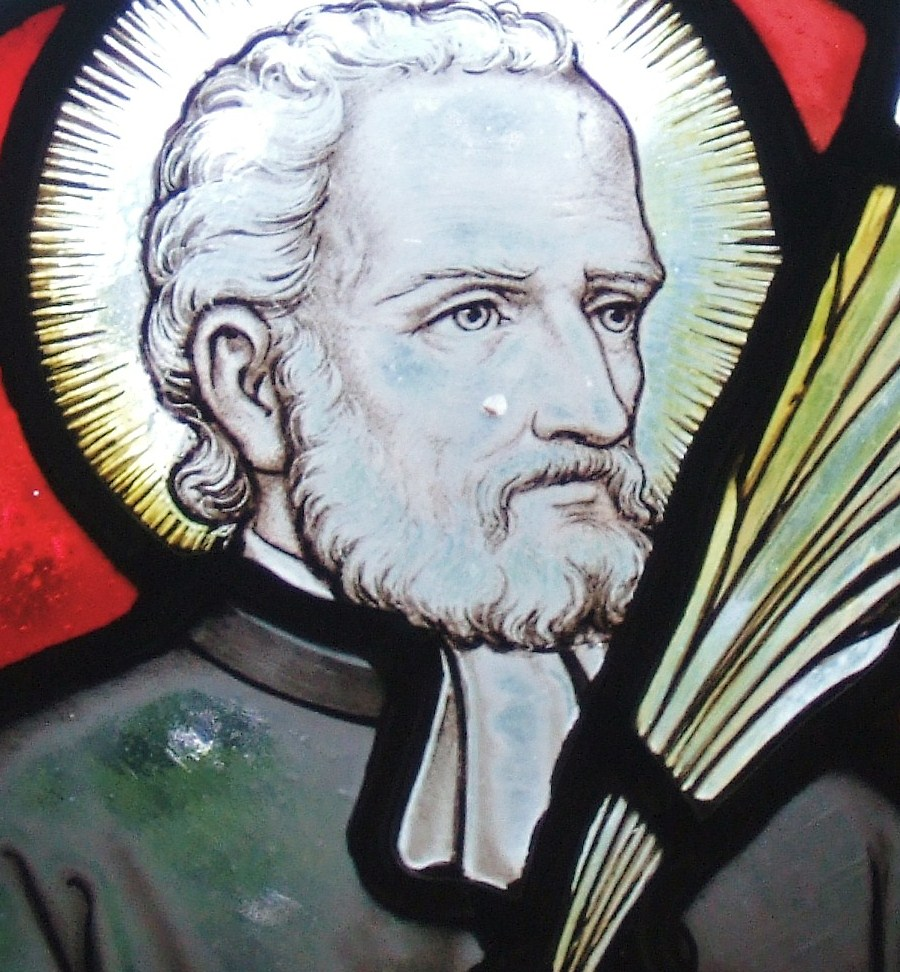

Priest and Martyr
- Born: c. 1599; St Weonards, Herefordshire, England
- Died: 22 August 1679 (aged 79 - 80); Widemarsh Common, Hereford, Herefordshire, England
- Venerated in: Roman Catholic Church
- Beatified: 15 December 1929 by Pope Pius XI
- Canonized: 25 October 1970 by Pope Paul VI
- Major shrine: His grave in the churchyard of St Mary the Virgin at Welsh Newton
- Feast: 22 August, 25 October
- Attributes: martyr's palm

John Kemble (c. 1599 – 22 August 1679) was an English Catholic priest killed by the crown due to his ministry. He was canonized in 1970 by Pope Paul VI as one of the Forty Martyrs of England and Wales.

== Early years and ordination ==
John Kemble was born at Rhydicar Farm, St Weonards, Herefordshire, in 1599, the son of John and Anne Kemble. They were a prominent local recusant Catholic family, which included four other priests. His cousin was another future martyr – David Lewis. John Kemble was ordained at Douai College, on 23 February 1625. He returned to England on 4 June 1625 as a missionary in Monmouthshire and Herefordshire.

== Pastoral work ==
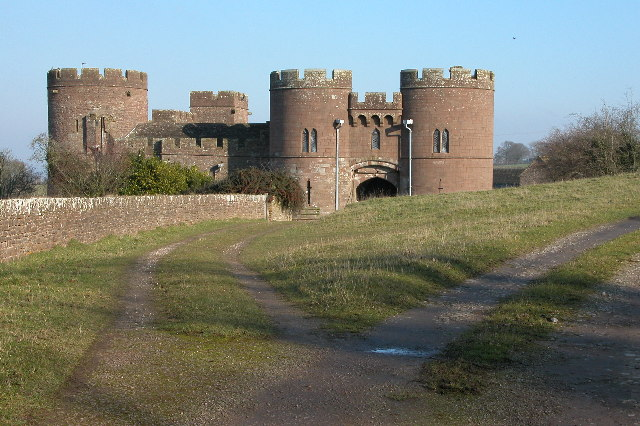
Pembridge Castle

In normal times, despite harsh anti-Catholic laws, the extent of persecution depended upon the sympathies of local landowners. Around Hereford and Monmouth, where the Catholic Earl of Worcester (from 1642 Marquess) held sway at Raglan Castle, the old religion was for long periods practised with impunity, even after his own conversion to the Church of England. From 1622 there was even a Jesuit College at Cwm, Llanrothal, near Welsh Newton, which survived until 1678, though its existence was widely known, and was twice debated in the House of Commons.

Upon Kemble's return to Monmouthshire, he served more than 50 years as an itinerant priest, often serving mass at Treago Castle, the feudal seat of his home village of St. Weonards, winning admirers even among Protestants. Little is known of his work caring for his flock during these 53 years. The condition of Catholics had eased but priests still needed to perform their ministry discreetly. Based at Pembridge Castle, the home of his nephew, Captain Richard Kemble, he had seemed immune from prosecution.

== Titus Oates' plot ==
The uneasy tolerance within which Kemble had operated was shattered by the Popish Plot of 1678. Titus Oates was a perjurer who concocted a plot in which the Anglican Charles II would be assassinated and his Catholic brother (later, King James II) installed as king in his place.

When Oates' story was examined in detail the whole fraud was exposed, but it gave disgruntled Protestants and ambitious chancers an opportunity. Anti-Catholic politicians made cynical use of this "plot" to implicate English Catholics, particularly priests. Among the many Catholics caught up in the frenzy was John Kemble. David Lewis was apprehended at St. Michael's Church, Llantarnam.

== Arrest and execution ==
Father Kemble was staying at Pembridge Castle, near Welsh Newton, when he was arrested on 7 December 1678. He was warned about the impending arrest but declined to leave his flock, saying, "According to the course of nature, I have but a few years to live. It will be an advantage to suffer for my religion and, therefore, I will not abscond". He was arrested by Captain John Scudamore of Kentchurch. It is a comment on the tortuous values of the age that Scudamore's own wife and children were parishioners of Kemble. Kemble was kept in Hereford Gaol until the Spring Assizes of 1679. In April 1679 Kemble, now 80, was ordered to be taken to London to be interviewed about the plot. As the elderly priest had difficulty riding a horse, he was strapped like a pack to his horse on the way there. He was found to have had no connection with the alleged plot but found guilty of the treasonous crime of being a Catholic priest. He was sentenced to be hanged, drawn and quartered. He was returned to Hereford for the sentence to be carried out, and allowed to walk most of the way back.

Before he was led out to his execution on 22 August 1679 Kemble insisted on saying his prayers and finishing his drink, and the assembled party joined the elderly priest in a final smoke and a cup of sack. The Herefordshire sayings, Kemble pipe and Kemble cup, refer to a parting pipe or cup. Before his death Kemble addressed the assembled crowd, pointing out that no association with the "plot" had been charged to him. The old priest went on to say: "The failure of the authorities in London to connect me to the plot makes it evident that I die only for profession of the Catholic religion, which was the religion that first made this Kingdom Christian."

Consoling his distraught hangman, the priest is said to have whispered, "Honest Anthony, my friend Anthony, be not afraid; do thy office. I forgive thee with all my heart. Thou wilt do me a greater kindness than discourtesy."

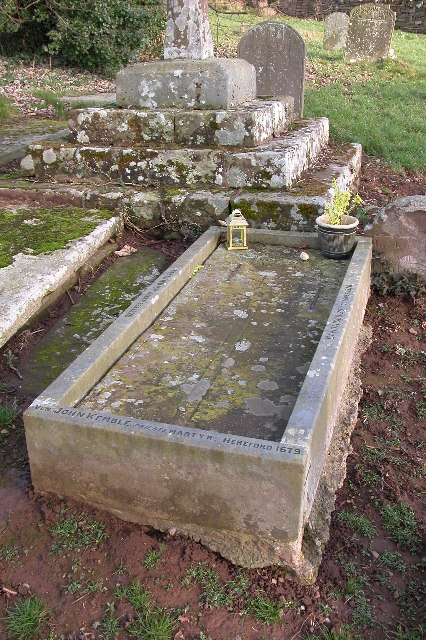
Grave of John Kemble

Kemble was allowed to die on the gallows before being drawn and quartered, thus he was spared the agony suffered by many other Catholic martyrs of England, Scotland and Wales. He died on 22 August 1679 at Widemarsh Common, Hereford. His death was greeted with dismay in the locality, Protestants no less than Catholics praising him as "a great gentleman".

One of Kemble's hands is still preserved at St Francis Xavier Church in Hereford city centre. His body rests in the (Church of England) churchyard of St Mary the Virgin at Welsh Newton, and local Catholics make an annual pilgrimage to his grave.

== Sainthood ==
Miracles were soon attributed to the saintly priest. Scudamore's daughter was cured of throat cancer, and Scudamore's wife recovered her hearing whilst praying at Kemble's grave. John Kemble was beatified in 1929 by Pope Pius XI and canonized on 25 October 1970 by Pope Paul VI as one of the Forty Martyrs of England and Wales.

== Relatives ==
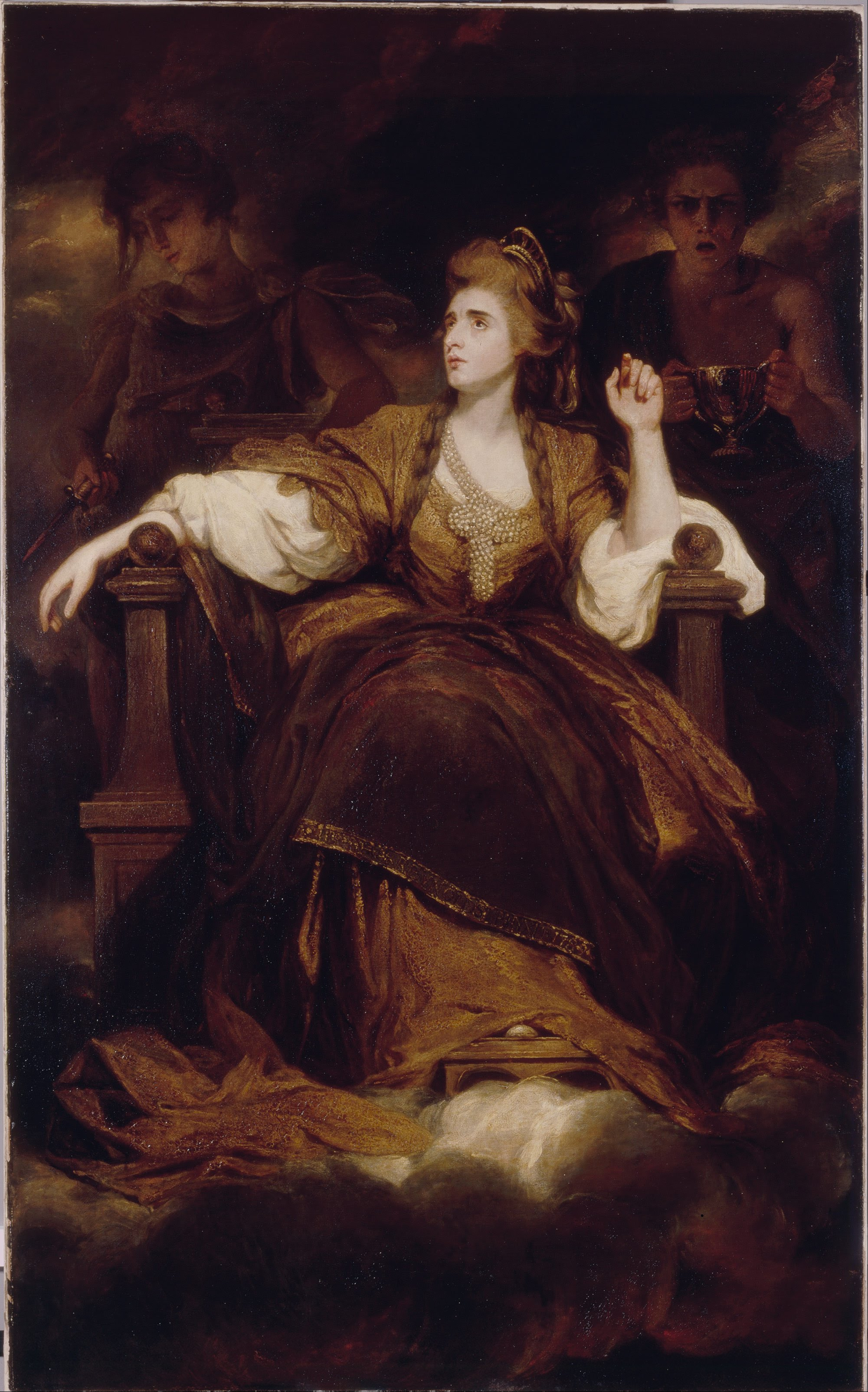
Sarah Siddons as the Tragic Muse by Sir Joshua Reynolds (The Huntington, San Marino, California)

The famous Kemble family are relatives of John Kemble. The family became almost a 'Royal Family' of the English stage in the nineteenth century. The most famous was Sarah Siddons, née Kemble. It has been said that she was the finest English tragic actress ever. She was John Kemble's great-great-grandniece.

Other noteworthy members of the family, though not Catholics, were: Roger Kemble, Stephen Kemble, Charles Kemble, John Mitchell Kemble, Frances Anne Kemble who after spending time in the United States held strong anti slavery opinions, Adelaide Kemble and Henry Kemble. The actor John Philip Kemble was baptized a Catholic and spent some time at Douai.

== Dates ==
- Canonised 25 October 1970 by Pope Paul VI
- 25 October, Feast Day of the Forty Martyrs of England and Wales

== See also ==
- Welsh Newton - Pembridge Castle and Father Kemble's local links

== Sources ==
- Encyclopædia Britannica, 15th Edition
- Edmund Campion, by Evelyn Waugh, Longmans, Green and Co., 1935
