= Healthcare in Herefordshire =

Healthcare in Herefordshire was the responsibility of Herefordshire Clinical Commissioning Group until July 2022.

== History ==
From 1947 to 1974 NHS services in Herefordshire were managed by the Birmingham Regional Hospital Board. In 1974 the boards were abolished and replaced by regional health authorities. Worcestershire still came under the Birmingham RHA. Regions were reorganised in 1996 and Herefordshire came under the West Midlands Regional Health Authority. From 1974 there was an area health authority covering the county. There was one primary care trust established in the county in 2002, which was managed by the West Mercia Strategic Health Authority which merged into West Midlands Strategic Health Authority in 2006.

== Herefordshire and Worcestershire Health and Care NHS Trust ==
Supporting children, adults and older people, the Trust is a major provider of mental health and learning disability services across Herefordshire and Worcestershire. The 2024 Chief Executive of the Herefordshire and Worcestershire Health and Care NHS Trust is Robert Mackie and the Chair is Mark Yates. Their Integrated Community Services provides support to about 10,000 patients.

== Commissioning ==
Hereford and Worcestershire was one of the four areas chosen to trial the integration of specialised commissioning, previously run by NHS England centrally, in September 2016. The four clinical commissioning groups, South Worcestershire, Redditch and Bromsgrove, Wyre Forest, and Herefordshire were due to merge in 2020.

== Primary care ==
There are 25 GP practices in the county. Out-of-hours services are provided by Nestor Primecare Services Ltd. A healthcare hub is being constructed in the centre of Hereford. Five GP surgeries are to join together under one roof with an on-site pharmacy.

== Acute services ==
Acute hospital services are provided by Wye Valley NHS Trust which administers Hereford County Hospital.

== Mental health and community care ==
Mental health services are provided by Gloucestershire Health and Care NHS Foundation Trust and community care by Wye Valley NHS Trust. In 2024, based on a survey commissioned by The Care Quality Commission (CQC), the Community mental health services in Herefordshire and Worcestershire were rated amongst the best in England in the annual Community Mental Health Survey.
