= Welsh Newton =

Village in Herefordshire, England

Coordinates: 51.858°N 2.728°W

- Location within Herefordshire
- Population: 316 (2011)
- OS grid reference: SO49961796
- Civil parish: Welsh Newton
- Unitary authority: Herefordshire
- Ceremonial county: Herefordshire
- Region: West Midlands
- Country: England
- Sovereign state: United Kingdom
- Post town: MONMOUTH
- Postcode district: NP25
- Dialling code: 01600
- Police: West Mercia
- Fire: Hereford and Worcester
- Ambulance: West Midlands
- UK Parliament: Hereford and South Herefordshire

Welsh Newton is a small village and civil parish in the county of Herefordshire, England. It is located close to the border with Wales to which the parish extends towards Monmouthshire. It should not be confused with Newton, a township-chapelry in Clodock Parish and near Longtown, or with Newton Leominister. Its postal address is in Wales, with Monmouth as its post town.

== History ==
The parish of Welsh Newton (which is grouped with the parish of Llanrothal to form Welsh Newton and Llanrothal Group Parish Council) contains two churches: a derelict Methodist chapel and the church of St Mary the Virgin which is also CoE and of Norman architecture, at Welsh Newton (containing an original rood screen). Catholic martyr St John Kemble, executed in 1679, is buried in St Mary's churchyard. There is another Anglican church at Llanrothal.

The area contains a lot of history, including Pembridge Castle and at least thirty-one other archaeological sites in Welsh Newton parish alone. The parish also contains a piece of common land, currently registered as unowned under the Commons Act 2006, at Welsh Newton Common; a hill (and hamlet) overlooking the Wye Valley. The village is said to be haunted by several restless spirits, including the headless coachman who has been seen many times on the lane from St Wulstan's Farm to the village. In the first week of December each year, several locals hold a ceremony to still the spirits. This takes place in the ruins of St Faith's Church.

According to Kelly's Directory of Herefordshire 1929:

"Welsh Newton is a Parish on the Hereford and Monmouth road, three and a half miles north from Monmouth and 8 south west from Ross, in the Southern Division of the county, Wormelow Hundred, Monmouth union and county court district, Harewood End Petty Sessional division, rural deanery of Archenfield and archdeaconry and diocese of Hereford. The Parish extends into Monmouthshire. The church of St. Mary is a plain but ancient building of stone in the Norman style, consisting of chancel, nave, south porch and a small western tower containing 2 bells: the screen is 12th century, lit by a 14th-century dormer window: the roof is 14th century; the stained east window was presented by Mrs. Marriot, in 1879, and there are memorial windows to Mrs. Tylor, of Callow Hill, who died in 1881. The register of baptisms dates from the year 1798; marriages, 1758; burials, 1800. The living is a vicarage, with the rectory of Llanrothal annexed in 1927...in the gift of the Bishop of Hereford. There is a Primitive Methodist Chapel on Welsh Newton Common. Pembridge Castle, built prior to the 13th century, is now a farmhouse. This historic castle was purchased by Dr. Hedley Bartlet (known as Mar Hedley, a Syro-Chaldean bishop), and partially restored in 1914; It was the home for many years of the priest and martyr Father John Kemble (d. 1679), whose tomb pilgrims visit in the village churchyard; his hand is preserved in a shrine at Hereford. The soil is loamy; subsoil, clay and rock. The chief crops are wheat, barley, oats, turnips and fruit. The area is 1,943 acres (7.9 km²)."

(1) Cf Wikipedia: Counties (Detached Parts) Act 1844

== Folklore ==
In 1913, the historian John Hobson Matthews noted, “The bells of Welsh Newton, Herefordshire, are supposed to say: - "Erfin, cawl erfin" - turnips, turnip broth. This is taken to refer to the bareness of that parish “.

== Welsh Newton Common ==
The settlement of Welsh Newton Common within the parish is scattered across an area of registered common land with no known owner. The last attempt to establish ownership was made by Margaret Eldrudd De L'Isle in 1976, the then owner of the Glanusk Estate. Following a hearing before the Commons Commissioners the application was refused and the common remains unowned. In the absence of an owner, Herefordshire Council manages but does not own the common, nor can it grant rights over it (for example, rights of way) as an owner might. Under section 45 of the Commons Act 2006 the council has the power to

(a) take any steps to protect the land against unlawful interference that could be taken by an owner in possession of the land; and

(b) institute proceedings against any person for any offence committed in respect of the land.

== Notable buildings ==
Pembridge House is an 18th-century listed former Parsonage house situated in a central position within the village. Tremaide Farmhouse and its range of traditional farm buildings overlook the village to the east of the A466. Parkside Farm to the west of the village is a traditional stone farmhouse.
