= Herefordshire =

County of England

- Ceremonial county
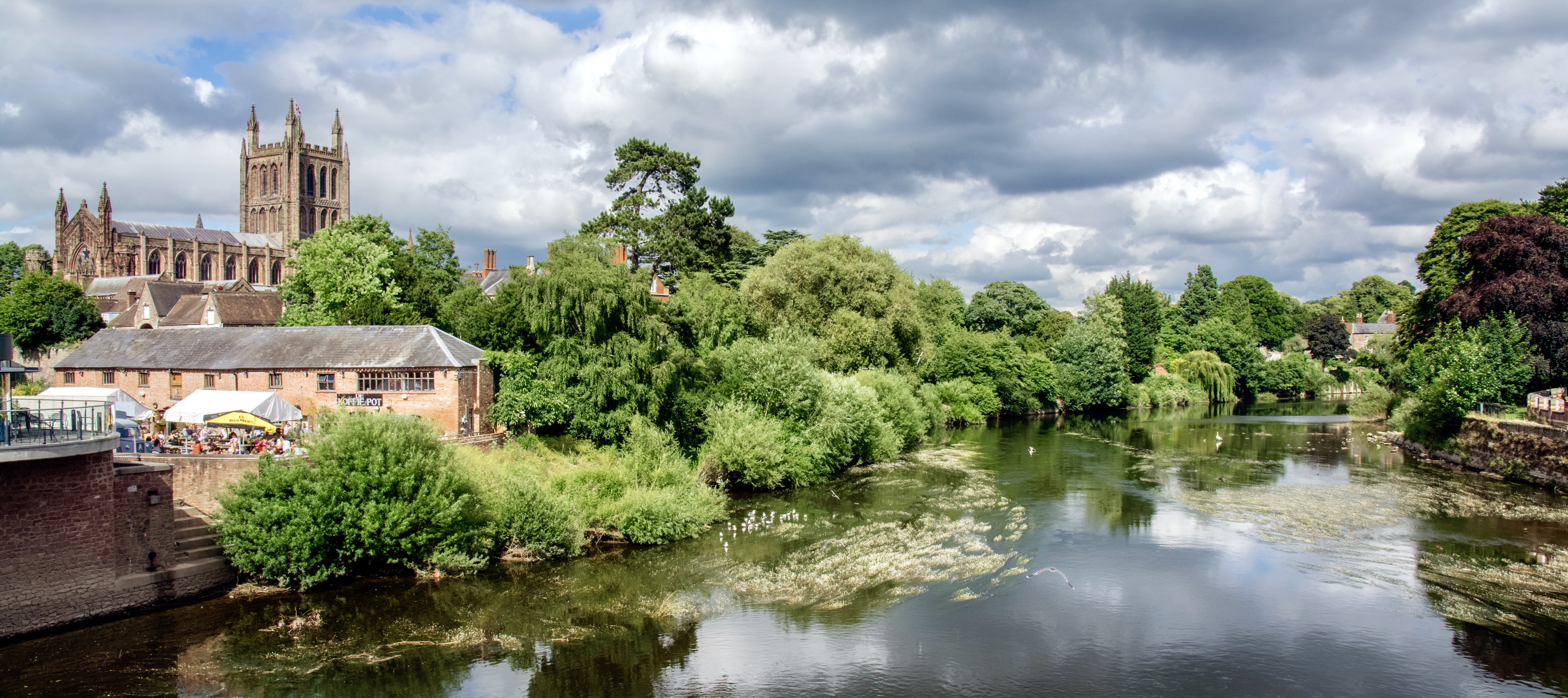
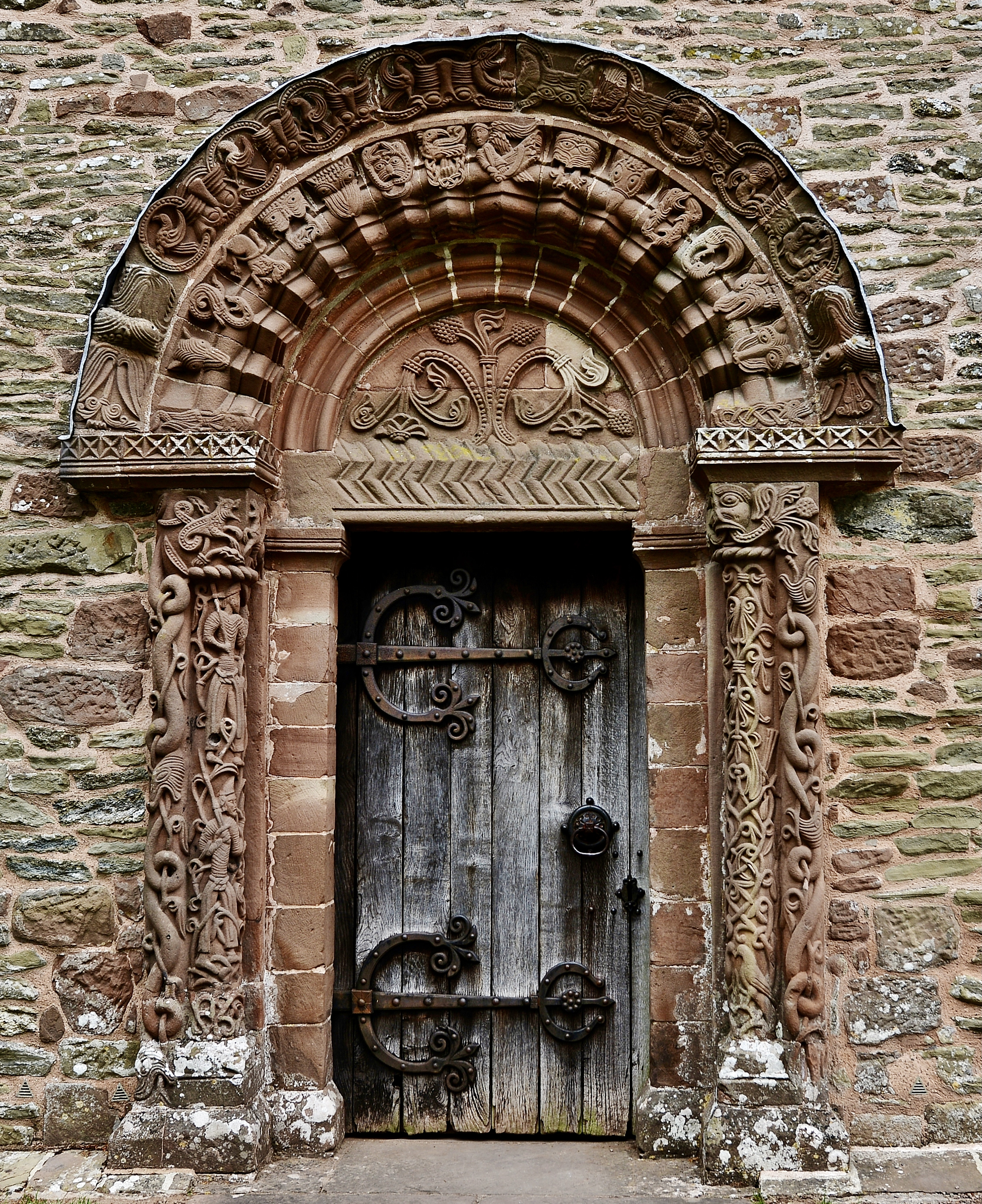
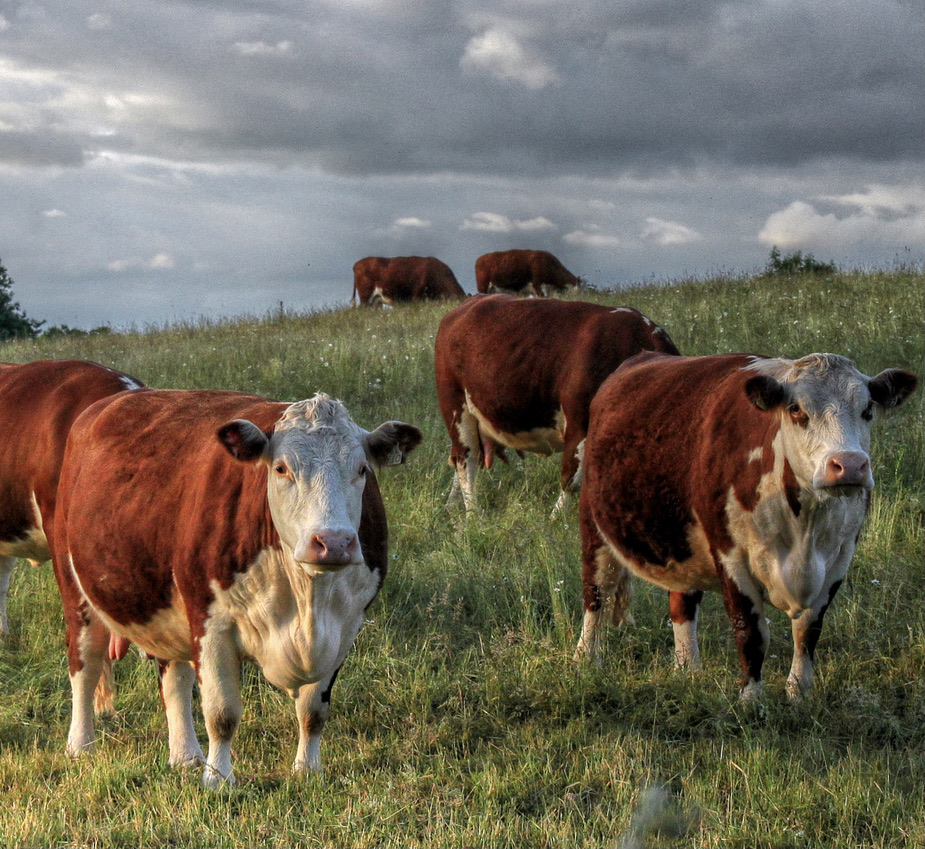
- The River Wye at Hereford, with Hereford Cathedral on the left; the Norman south door of Kilpeck Church; and Hereford cattle

- Coordinates: 52°05′N 2°45′W
- Sovereign state: United Kingdom
- Constituent country: England
- Region: West Midlands
- Established: 1 April 1998
- Established by: Local Government Commission for England
- Preceded by: Hereford and Worcester
- Origin: Ancient
- Time zone: UTC+0 (GMT)
  - Summer (DST): UTC+1 (BST)
- UK Parliament: List of MPs
- Police: West Mercia Police
- Ceremonial county
- Lord Lieutenant: Edward Harley
- High Sheriff: Tamsin Sczerina Clive
- Area: 2,180 km^{2} (840 sq mi)
  - Rank: 26th of 48
- Population (2024): 191,047
  - Rank: 45th of 48
  - Density: 88/km^{2} (230/sq mi)
- Unitary authority
- Council: Herefordshire Council
- Control: No overall control
- Admin HQ: Hereford
- Area: 2,180 km^{2} (840 sq mi)
  - Rank: 12th of 296
- Population (2025): 192,539
  - Rank: 108th of 296
  - Density: 88/km^{2} (230/sq mi)
- ISO 3166-2: GB-HEF
- GSS code: E06000019
- ITL: UKG11
- Website: herefordshire.gov.uk

Herefordshire (/ˈhɛrɪfərdʃɪər, -ʃər/ HERR-if-ərd-sheer, -shər) is a ceremonial county in the West Midlands of England, bordered by Shropshire to the north, Worcestershire to the east, Gloucestershire to the south-east, and the Welsh counties of Monmouthshire and Powys to the west. The city of Hereford is the largest settlement.

The county is rural, with an area of 2,180 square kilometres (840 sq mi) and an estimated population of 191,047 in 2024. Hereford is near the centre of the county, and other settlements include Leominster in the north, Ledbury in the east, and Ross-on-Wye in the south. For local government purposes Herefordshire is a unitary authority area.

The centre of Herefordshire is lowland which is crossed by the River Wye and its tributary, the Lugg. To the east are the Malvern Hills, a national landscape, which straddle the boundary with Worcestershire. The south of the county contains the northern part of the Wye Valley, also a national landscape, which stretches into Wales. In the west, the ground rises to the Black Mountains range; this contains the Black Mountain (Twyn Llech), which lies on the Powys border and is the highest point in the county, at 703.6 metres (2,308 ft).

The county is in the historic Welsh Marches. The land use is mostly agricultural, and the county is known for its fruit and cider production, and for the Hereford cattle breed.

== Physical geography ==
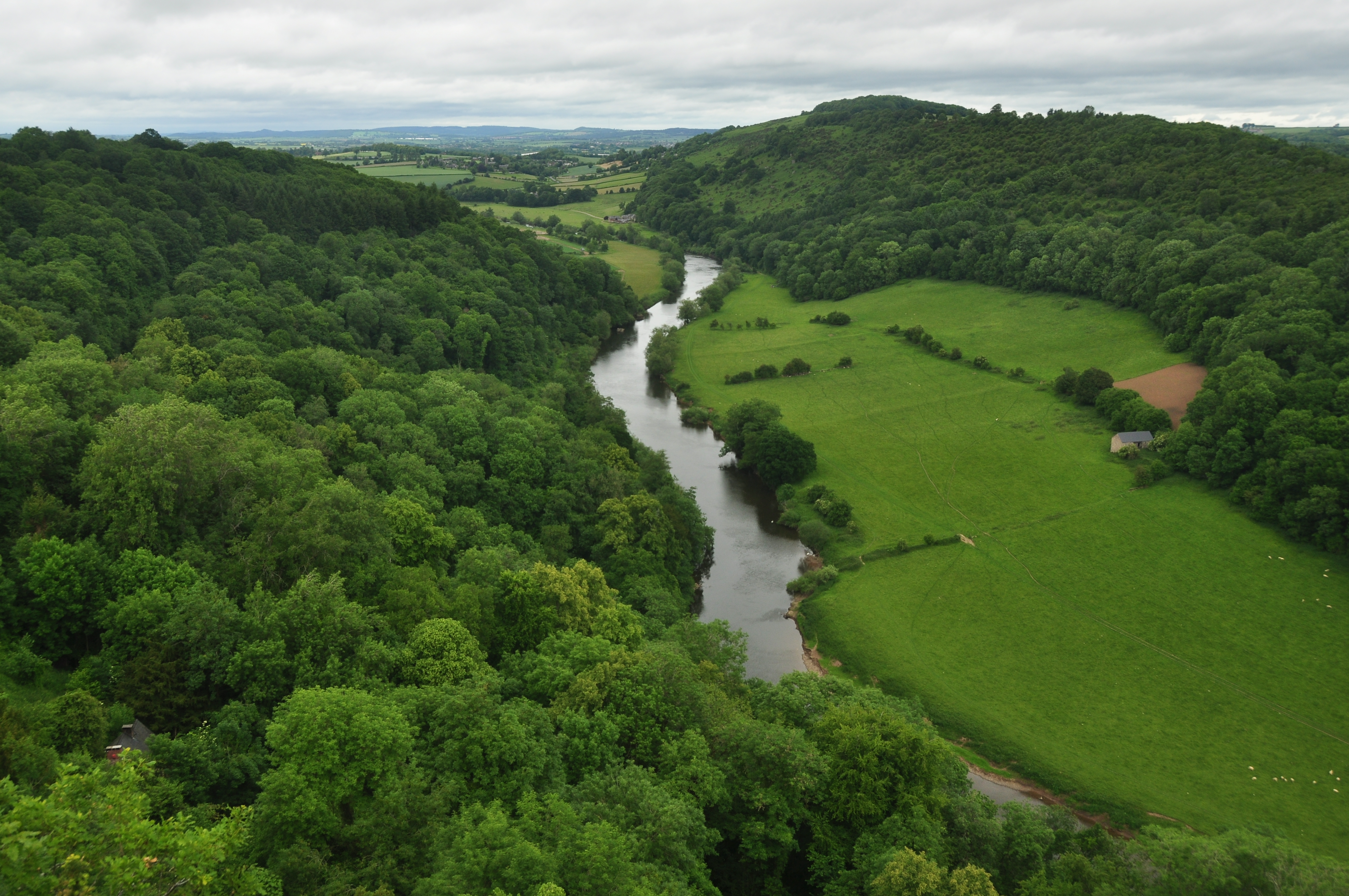
The River Wye at Symonds Yat

The River Wye, which at 135 miles (217 km) is the fourth-longest in the United Kingdom, enters the county after briefly being its border with Powys. It flows through both Hereford and Ross-on-Wye before returning to Wales. Leominster is on the River Lugg, a tributary of the Wye.

There are two Areas of Outstanding Natural Beauty in the county. The Wye Valley is in the river's valleys south of Hereford, while the Malvern Hills are in the east of the county, along its border with Worcestershire.

The county is notably hilly. The following summits lie in the county and are above 300 metres (984 ft) with more than 30 metres (98 ft) of prominence:

1. Black Mountain (703.6 m)
2. Cefn Hill (486 m)
3. Hergest Ridge (426.9 m)
4. Bradnor Hill (391.5 m)
5. Harley's Mountain (386 m)
6. Rushock Hill (378 m)
7. High Vinnalls (376.4 m)
8. Herrock Hill (371 m)
9. Garway Hill (366.6 m)
10. Bringewood (363 m)
11. Pinnacle Hill (357 m) (Malvern Hills)
12. Gatley Hill (338 m)
13. Herefordshire Beacon (338 m) (Malvern Hills)
14. Pedwardine Hill (334.5 m)
15. Brampton Scar (334.1 m)
16. Cole's Hill (334 m)
17. The Globe (333 m)
18. Wapley Hill (332.8 m)
19. Hell Peak (331 m)
20. Shobdon Hill (327.7 m)
21. Stapleton Hill East (323.4 m)
22. Mynydd Ferddin (323 m)
23. Nash Hill (321 m)
24. Merbach Hill (318.6 m)
25. Knill Hill (314 m)
26. Mary Knoll (308 m)
27. Croft Ambrey (307 m)
28. Shelderton Hill (307 m)

== History ==
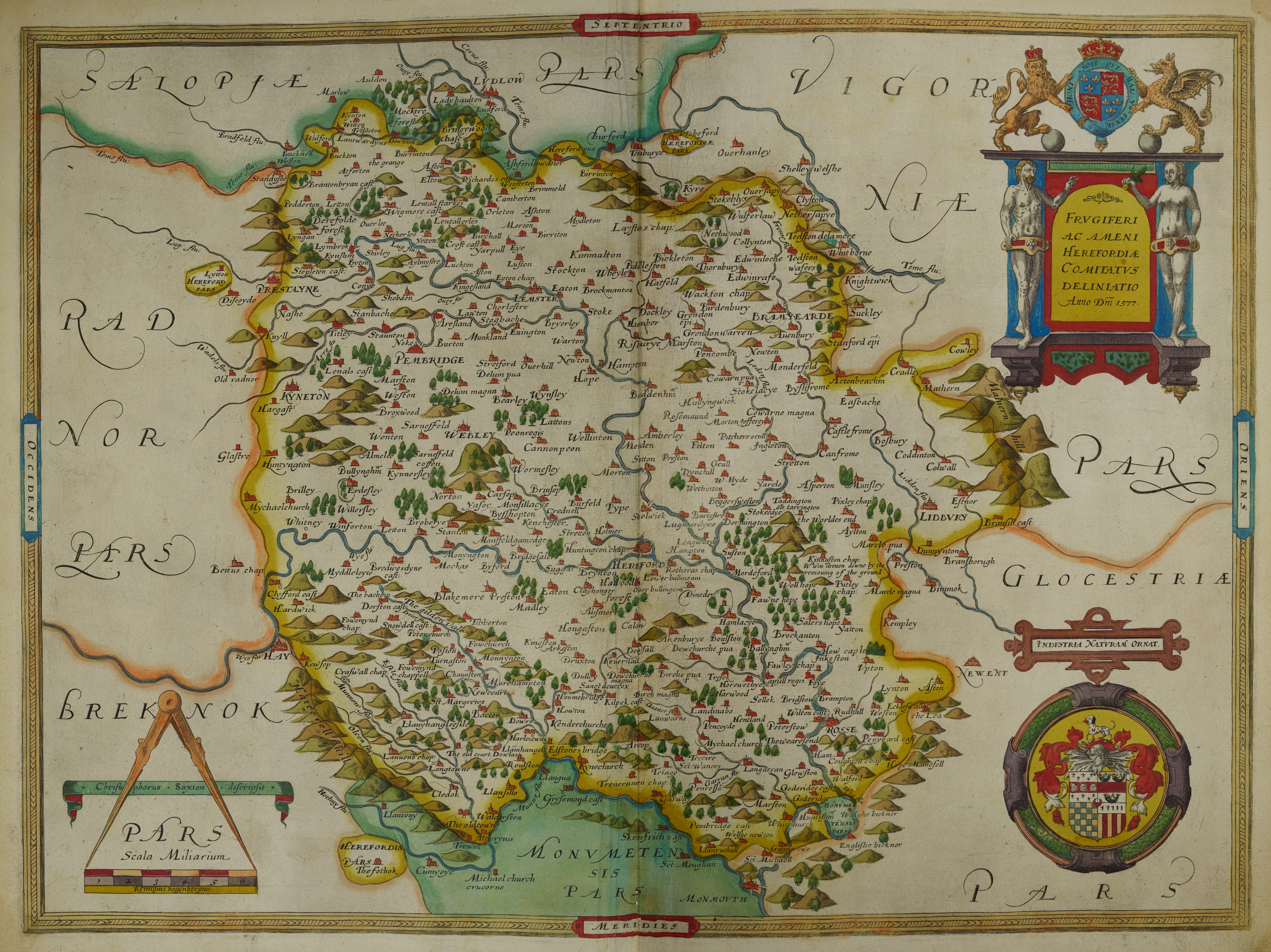
Hand-drawn map of Herefordshire by Christopher Saxton in 1576

Herefordshire is one of the 39 historic counties of England. Herefordshire County Council was created in 1889.

In 1974, the administrative county formed in 1889 was merged with that of neighbouring Worcestershire to form Hereford and Worcester. Within this, Herefordshire was covered by the local government districts of South Herefordshire, Hereford, and part of Malvern Hills and Leominster districts. However, the county was dissolved in 1998, resulting in the return of Herefordshire and Worcestershire as counties.

The county and unitary authority created in 1998 has almost identical borders to the pre-1974 county; a small area at Park Wood had been transferred from Mathon to West Malvern in 1986 and so went to Worcestershire rather than Herefordshire in 1998, but otherwise the re-established border between the two counties was identical to the pre-1974 boundary.

== Constitution ==
From 1974 to 1998, Herefordshire was part of the former non-metropolitan county of Hereford and Worcester.

Herefordshire was reconstituted both as a new district as "County of Herefordshire" and as a new county (coextensive with the area of the aforementioned district) (effective 1 April 1998) by Statutory Instrument as defined in The Hereford and Worcester (Structural, Boundary and Electoral Changes) Order 1996. This Order established Herefordshire as a unitary authority on 1 April 1998, combining county and district functions into a single council. Herefordshire is also commonly called a unitary district, but this is not official nomenclature. Herefordshire is officially known as a unitary authority for local government purposes. It is governed by Herefordshire Council which was created in 1998 with the new unitary district that absorbed the previous administrative areas of Hereford City Council, South Herefordshire District Council, most of Leominster District Council, and part of Malvern Hills District Council, all within the previous non-metropolitan county of Hereford and Worcester, whose functions the new authority inherited within its area. The remainder of Malvern Hills district absorbed the Worcestershire part of Leominster district (the area around Tenbury Wells) and continued to constitute a (smaller) district within the new two-tier county of Worcestershire.

The Lieutenancies Act 1997 made Herefordshire a ceremonial county, covering the exact area of the unitary district. For Eurostat purposes it is a NUTS 3 region (code UKG11) and is one of three counties that comprise the "Herefordshire, Worcestershire and Warwickshire" NUTS 2 region.

== Demographics ==
In Herefordshire, the population size has increased by 2.0%, from around 183,500 in 2011 to 187,100 in 2021. This is lower than the overall increase for England (6.6%), where the population grew by nearly 3.5 million to 56,489,800.

As of the 2021 census, 91.1% of the population identified as 'White British', and 5.1% as 'White Other'. The 'White Other' group is largely made up of migrants from central and Eastern Europe who began moving into the county in the early 2000s, initially for agricultural work, but more recently to work in other sectors such as health care, catering and hospitality. Poland and Romania are the two most common non-UK countries of birth for foreign born people in Herefordshire.

=== Travellers ===
Roma and Travellers have historically been Herefordshire's largest minority ethnic group. They are made up of three main groups:

- Romanichal or Romani
- Irish Travellers
- New Travellers or New Age Travellers

As of the 2021 census, they number 600 people, at around 0.2% of the county's population.

The Roma and Irish Travellers fall within the definition of a minority ethnic group under the Race Relations Amendment Act (2000). There were approximately 400 people (0.2%) within this minority group in the county at the 2011 Census.

== Economy ==
Bulmers Cider in Hereford is the world's largest cider factory, and has the world's largest vat (for Strongbow), built in 1975. Painter Brothers (part of Balfour Beatty) in the north of Hereford, is the UK's largest manufacturer of electricity pylons (transmission towers), broadcasting masts, the Callender-Hamilton bridge, and rail electrification structures. Special Metals Wiggin, part of Special Metals Corporation, based at Hereford was the main producer of nickel alloys in Europe, with a large site directly north of Painter Brothers. Cargill Meats Europe (formerly Sun Valley) have a large poultry meat processing facility, processing chickens from around Herefordshire.

Cadbury (Mondelēz International) make milk chocolate crumb near Marlbrook (near Leominster). Weston's Cider is in Much Marcle, who also make Stowford Press. Wye Fruit Ltd is in the north of Ledbury on the B4214 and is a large site of Amcor, and further west is Universal Beverages (UBL), owned by Heineken since 2007 where it cans cider. The site of Ledbury Preserves of RHM made Robertson's jam, mincemeat and marmalade and closed in 2008 when production moved to Cambridgeshire. Holden Aluminium Technologies are a sports car chassis manufacturer at Linton. Kingspan Insulation is based at Pembridge. BT's Madley Communications Centre, claims to be the world's largest earth station. Tyrrells Potato Crisps are at Dilwyn west of Leominster.

This is a chart of trend of regional gross value added of Herefordshire at current basic prices published by the Office for National Statistics with figures in millions of British Pounds Sterling.

Year	Regional Gross Value Added	Agriculture	Industry	Services
1995	1,622	218	567	836
2000	1,885	155	643	1,087
2003	2,216	185	708	1,323

includes hunting and forestry

includes energy and construction

includes financial intermediation services indirectly measured

Components may not sum to totals due to rounding

Many well-known cider producers are based in Herefordshire. These include Weston's cider of Much Marcle, and Bulmer's cider, from Hereford, which produces the UK market leader Strongbow.

== Cities, towns and villages ==
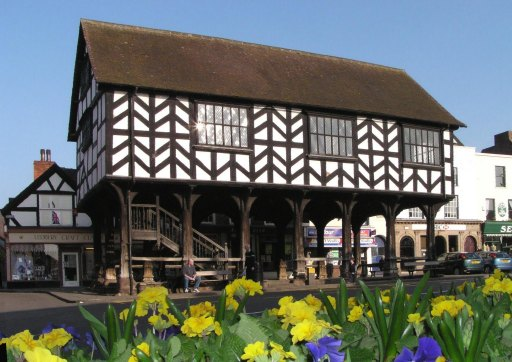
The Market Hall, Ledbury

The major settlements in the county include Hereford, which is the county town and Herefordshire's only city, as well as the towns of Leominster, Ledbury, Ross-on-Wye, Kington and Bromyard.

== Employment ==
Most employment in Herefordshire is in agriculture, manufacturing and services. According to Herefordshire Council's online document "worklessness", 10% of people are unemployed in Herefordshire including out-of-work, homeless, ill and disabled and their carers. Cargill Meats and H. P. Bulmers are two of the largest private sector employers, with the Council and NHS being the largest public sector employers.

== Politics ==
=== Westminster Parliamentary ===
There are two parliamentary constituencies in Herefordshire. As of July 2024, Ellie Chowns, a member of the Green Party, represents North Herefordshire and Jesse Norman, a member of the Conservative Party, represents Hereford and South Herefordshire.

=== Council ===
The coat of arms of Herefordshire County Council

The council operates a cabinet-style council and has been independently controlled since 2019. The chairman is Sebastian Bowen and the leader of the council is David Hitchiner.

The cabinet leader is appointed yearly by the full council of 53 councillors. The cabinet leader then picks their deputy and up to eight other councillors to form the executive cabinet. Each cabinet member makes the decisions about the portfolio that they are allocated. Elections to the council are held every four years. Elections are conducted under the FPTP system with the 53 wards returning one councillor each. Elections have been held in 2000, 2003, 2007, 2011, 2015 and 2019, 2023, with the next election to be held in 2027.

In the 2019 election, the Conservatives lost control of Herefordshire Council. This remained true for the 2023 local elections in Herefordshire.

== Education ==
Herefordshire has a comprehensive education system that also includes several independent schools. Most state secondary schools are for ages 11–16. Providers of further and higher education in the county include Hereford College of Arts, Hereford College of Education, Hereford Sixth Form College, Herefordshire and Ludlow College, Royal National College for the Blind, NMITE and Herefordshire and Worcestershire Group Training Association (HWGTA).

== Agriculture ==
The agricultural economy has changed greatly in recent years within the county. The county is on the western edge of England which has been historically pastoral as opposed to the east which was more arable.

=== Beef ===
Probably Hereford's most famous export is its Hereford beef cattle. Herefords are docile but extremely hardy creatures and these attributes have led to their proliferation across the world, particularly the US, Canada, South America and Australia. The breed is so gentle that a Hereford bull was used as the mascot for Hereford United Football Club for many years, led around the club's Edgar Street ground before major matches.

=== Fruit ===
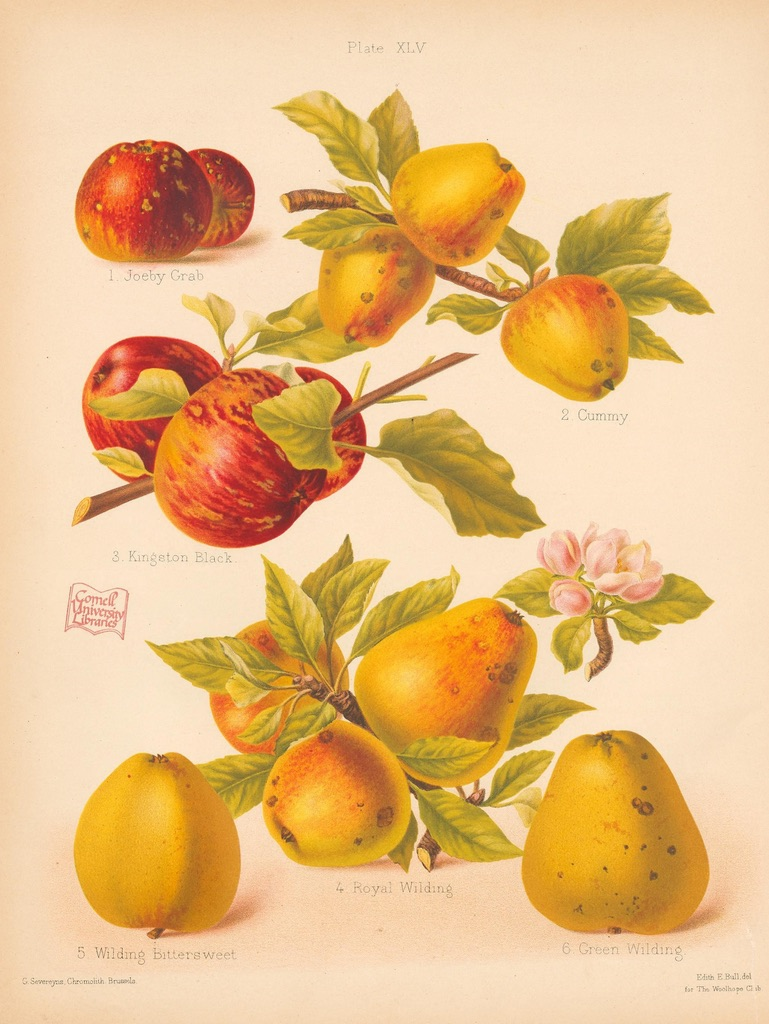
An illustration from the Herefordshire Pomona, a record of the apple and pear varieties grown in the county in the nineteenth century

The county is famous for its apple and pear orchards, and its cider. There are many orchards around the county but not as many as there once were.

In the last few years, soft fruits such as strawberries have become a new and rapidly expanding area of the agricultural economy of the county. One of the main reasons for this was the introduction of the polytunnel or French tunnel. This allows the strawberries to be grown for a far longer season and with a higher quality (with no blemishes from the rain). The strawberries are mainly picked by Eastern European workers who come over for the season and often earn more money than they could working in their own country and with the bonus, for many of them, of learning or improving their English. The polytunnels have been a major issue in the county, as some people see them as a "blot on the landscape".

Although some polytunnel sites are illegal, Herefordshire Council has turned a blind eye in the belief that agriculture must be allowed to innovate; otherwise it will stagnate and the county will suffer.

=== Dairy ===
Previously, most farms in the county had dairy cattle. Due to the cost of investing in new equipment, long hours, BSE, foot-and-mouth disease and mainly falling milk prices, the county's milk production has drastically reduced, with only a few farms still in dairy farming.

=== Potatoes ===
The county is historically pastoral. The soils are mostly clay, meaning that large scale potato production was very difficult, as tractors were not powerful enough to pull the large machinery required to harvest the crop. Around the early 1990s new technology and more powerful machines overcame this problem. Potato production started to increase, fuelled by a few other key factors: The previously pastoral soils had not had potatoes grown in them; consequently they were not infected with eelworm (Heterodera rostochiensis and Heterodera pallida), which in the east of England had to be sprayed against weekly (a large cost). Also, the clay soil produced an unblemished potato of the highest grade.

The intensive nature of the crop meant that potatoes could be grown viably on a given field in only one of every five years. Because potato growers always needed more land than they owned, they rented extra. This demand for rental fields came at a time when the rest of the industry was struggling and in serious decline. The potato farmers' rents of £300–500 per acre (as opposed to normally £80 per acre) were very helpful to many farmers in a difficult period.

== Emblems ==
The flag of the historic county of Herefordshire

=== Coat of arms ===
Herefordshire County Council was granted a coat of arms on 28 February 1946. The arms became obsolete in 1974 on the abolition of the council, but were transferred to the present Herefordshire Council by Order in Council in 1997.

The arms are blazoned as follows:

Gules on a fesse wavy between in chief a lion passant guardant argent and in base a Herefordshire bull's head caboshed proper, a bar wavy azure; and for a Crest on a wreath of the colours a demi lion rampant gules holding in the sinister claw a fleece or; and for Supporters, on the dexter side a lion guardant or gorged with a wreath of hops fructed proper and on the sinister a talbot argent gorged with a collar or charged with three apples proper.

The red colouring ("gules") of the shield is taken from the arms of the City of Hereford. The red colour also represents the red earth of Herefordshire. The silver and blue wave across the centre of the shield represents the River Wye. The lions that form parts of the arms, crest and supporters are also taken from Hereford's arms. The agricultural produce of Herefordshire is represented by the bull's head, fleece, hops and apples. The talbot dog comes from the heraldry of the Talbot family, Marcher Lords of Shrewsbury and also from that of Viscount Hereford.

The Latin motto is: Pulchra terra Dei donum ("This fair land is the gift of God").

=== County flower ===
As part of a competition organised by the charity Plantlife to raise awareness of conservation issues, the public were asked to vote for "county flowers" that they felt best represented their county. Mistletoe was announced as the winning choice for Herefordshire in 2004. The emblem has no official status and has not been widely adopted. Herefordshire Council uses a logo consisting of a green apple.

== Media ==
=== Television ===
The county is covered by BBC West Midlands and ITV Central from its studios in Birmingham. Television signals are received from the Ridge Hill TV transmitter located 8.5 miles south east of Hereford.

=== Radio ===
BBC Local Radio the for county is served by BBC Hereford and Worcester which broadcast from Worcester but also has another studio in Hereford. County-wide radio stations are Hits Radio Herefordshire & Worcestershire, Sunshine Radio, Radio Wyvern, Capital Mid-Counties, and Greatest Hits Radio Herefordshire & Worcestershire.

== Sport ==
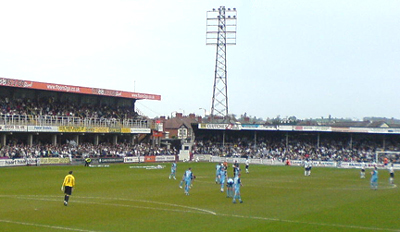
Edgar Street is the home ground of Hereford F.C., the successors to Hereford United, the only club from the county to have ever played in The Football League.

Perhaps the most famous sporting team in Herefordshire is Hereford United football club, founded in 1924, who were members of the Football League and played at Edgar Street stadium in the city of Hereford. The club then made its way upwards to the Southern Football League, finally gaining election to the Football League in 1972 and defeating Newcastle United in an FA Cup tie. Two successive promotions saw the club reach the Second Division in 1978, but two successive relegations followed and saw the club side back into the Fourth Division. The club was relegated in 1997 to the Football Conference, not regaining its Football League status until 2006. The club then played in Football League Two – the fourth tier of English football – for six years before once again being relegated out of the Football League at the end of the 2011–12 season. The club was wound up in 2014. A new phoenix club, Hereford F.C. was set up competing in the Midland Football League Premier Division (9th tier) for its first season, 2015–16.

Cricket is widely played within the county, and Herefordshire County Cricket Club compete in the Minor Counties Championship, having been elected in 1992 to take Durham's place, when that county joined the First-class structure.

== Places of interest ==
Key
	Abbey/Priory/Cathedral
Accessible open space	Accessible open space
	Amusement/Theme Park
	Castle
Country Park	Country Park
	English Heritage
	Forestry Commission
Heritage railway	Heritage railway
Historic house	Historic House
Places of Worship	Places of Worship
Museum (free) Museum	Museum (free/not free)
National Trust	National Trust
	Theatre
	Zoo

- Abbey Dore Court
- Arthur's Stone
- Berrington Hall
- Brockhampton Estate
- Courtyard Centre for the Arts – Hereford's main theatre and art performance centre
- Croft Castle
- Dore Abbey
- Eastnor Castle
- Edgar Street (Football Stadium Home to Hereford F.C.)
- Eye Manor
- Goodrich Castle
- Hampton Court
- Hellens Manor
- Hereford Cathedral
- Kilpeck Church
- Malvern Hills
- Herefordshire Beacon
- Priory Church, Leominster
- Sutton Walls Hill Fort
- Wigmore Castle
- Welsh Newton

== Transport ==
=== Road ===
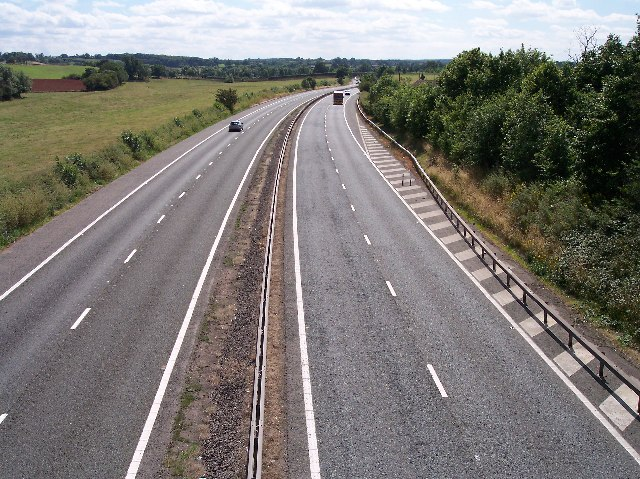
The M50 motorway near Ledbury and Ross-on-Wye

The M50, one of the first motorways to be built in the United Kingdom, runs through the south of the county and, with the A40 dual carriageway, forms part of the major route linking South Wales with the West Midlands and the north of England. The A49 runs north–south through the county and is a strategic route between North and South Wales as well as catering for local traffic.

=== Railways ===
The Welsh Marches Line also runs north–south with passenger trains operated by Transport for Wales offering links to Manchester as well as to North and South Wales. Hereford is the western end of the Cotswold Line which runs via Worcester with through services to Oxford and London Paddington (operated by Great Western Railway) and to Birmingham (operated by West Midlands Trains). The rural Heart of Wales Line linking Craven Arms in Shropshire to Llanelli in southwest Wales passes through the extreme north west of Herefordshire, with stations at Knighton, Powys (the station is in Shropshire but the township is in Powys) and Bucknell, Shropshire, near the meeting point of the boundaries of Herefordshire, Shropshire and Powys. The majority of passengers between North and South Wales use the Marches line.

Former lines which are now closed were the Ledbury and Gloucester Railway; Ross & Monmouth Railway; Hereford to Hay-on-Wye; Pontrilas to Hay-on-Wye; Hay-on-Wye to Brecon; Leominster to New Radnor; Eardisley to Presteigne; and Leominster to Worcester via Bromyard. Part of the Titley Spur is opened annually by enthusiasts and a steam train is run along the track.

There has long been talk of a new station at Rotherwas, in the south of Hereford.

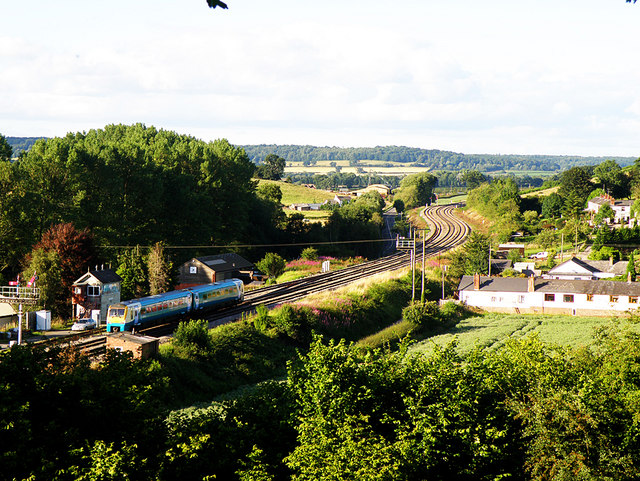
Arriva Trains Wales service passing the currently closed Pontrilas station on the Welsh Marches Line

=== Air ===
There are no airports with scheduled air transport in Herefordshire. Birmingham Airport, Cardiff Airport and Bristol Airport are the nearest. The RailAir RailAir coach operated by First Berkshire & The Thames Valley provides connections to Heathrow Airport via Reading station or passengers can change at Reading station and then go all the way by train via Hayes & Harlington to Heathrow Airport. Shobdon Aerodrome near Leominster is a centre for general aviation and gliding. Hot air ballooning is also popular with Eastnor Castle being one of the favourite launch sites in the area.

=== Waterways ===
Historically, the rivers Wye, Teme and Lugg were navigable but the wide seasonal variations in water levels mean that few craft larger than canoes and coracles are now used. There are canoe centres at Wye Valley Canoes, Glasbury-on-Wye (in Powys, Wales), the Hereford Youth Service and Kerne Bridge in Ross-on-Wye, as well as rowing clubs in Hereford and Ross-on-Wye.

The early 19th century saw the construction of two canals, The Herefordshire & Gloucestershire Canal and The Leominster & Stourport Canal but these were never successful and there are now few remains to be seen. The Herefordshire & Gloucestershire Canal is currently the subject a restoration project, which includes the construction of a new canal basin in Hereford city centre as part of the regeneration of the Edgar Street Grid. The project, however, is being undertaken by a small voluntary group and there is no expected date for any part of the canal to re-open for boating.

== Notable people ==
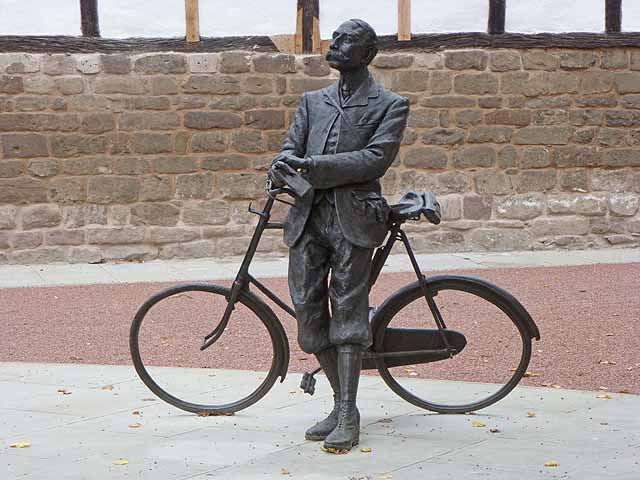
Classical composer Sir Edward Elgar lived in Hereford from 1904 to 1911. His association with the city is commemorated with this statue.

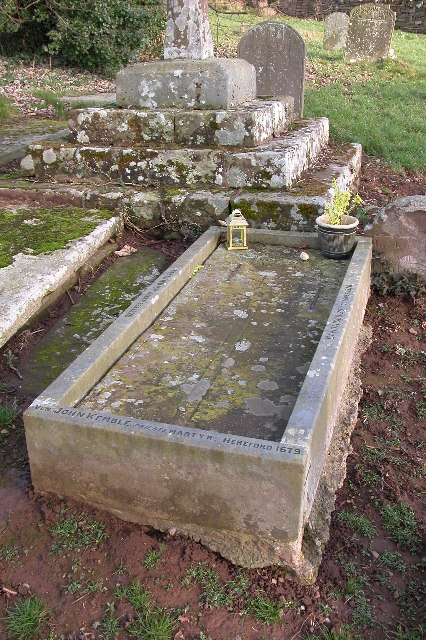
Roman Catholic martyr St. John Kemble's grave in the Herefordshire village of Welsh Newton

- Jarrod Bowen, footballer
- Simon Carr, cyclist
- Frank Oz, actor and voice actor, producer, director
- Matthew Hall, writer
- Dennis Potter, writer
- Connor Wickham, footballer
- Fred West, serial killer
- Elizabeth Barrett Browning, poet
- Richard Hammond, Top Gear and The Grand Tour presenter
- Mary Duggan, cricketer
- Noele Gordon, actress
- Mike Oldfield, musician
- Mick Ralphs, Mott the Hoople and Bad Company guitarist
- Richard Ashcroft, songwriter and lead singer of The Verve
- Thomas Britten, 19th-century footballer
- Monty Don, BBC TV presenter
- Robert Devereux, 2nd Earl of Essex, favourite of Queen Elizabeth I
- Bessie Drysdale, activist and writer
- Conroy Maddox, artist
- Beryl Reid, actress
- Jessica Raine, actress
- Sir Edward Elgar, composer
- Sir Roy Strong, art historian
- David Garrick, renowned actor of the 18th century
- Lady Godiva, wife of Leofric, Earl of Mercia
- Harold Godwinson, Earl of Hereford and last Anglo-Saxon King of England
- Ellie Goulding, musician
- Nell Gwynne, mistress of King Charles II of England
- Terry Jenkins, professional darts player
- St. John Kemble (martyr) Catholic priest
- Francis Kilvert, 19th century diarist and Church of England clergyman
- Henry Stanley Newman, Victorian philanthropist
- Mark Labbett, one of five Chasers on The Chase as well as its Australian counterpart
- Albert Lee, guitarist
- Quentin Letts, journalist
- Peter Mandelson, politician and former resident of Foy
- John Masefield, poet laureate
- Sidney Nolan, Australian artist
- John Oldcastle, Lollard leader and basis for Shakespeare's character Falstaff
- Blanche Parry, lady-in-waiting to Queen Elizabeth I
- Peter Scudamore, jockey
- James Honeyman-Scott, guitarist the Pretenders
- Pete Farndon, bass guitarist the Pretenders
- Martin Chambers, drummer the Pretenders
- Tom Spring, bare-knuckle boxer, champion of England in the 19th century
- Thomas Traherne, 17th century poet
- Alfred Watkins, pioneering archaeologist and photographer
- Richard Johnson, jockey
- Sir Walter Roper Lawrence, author
- Allan Leonard Lewis, posthumously awarded the Victoria Cross, died 21 September 1918, commemorated on Vis-En-Artois Memorial, France
- Richard Hakluyt, Elizabethan writer and geographer who recorded contemporary voyages of exploration and promoted the settlement of North America
- Ronald Pennell, artist, engraver and sculptor
- Geoffrey Wood, botanist
- Lucy Letby, serial killer

== See also ==
- Healthcare in Herefordshire
- Custos Rotulorum of Herefordshire – Keeper of the Rolls
- Herefordshire (UK Parliament constituency) – Historical list of MPs for Herefordshire constituency
- List of High Sheriffs of Herefordshire
- List of English and Welsh endowed schools (19th century)#Herefordshire
- List of schools in Herefordshire
- List of Lord Lieutenants of Herefordshire
