= Little Birch =

Hamlet in Herefordshire, England

Coordinates: 51.9833°N 2.71398°W

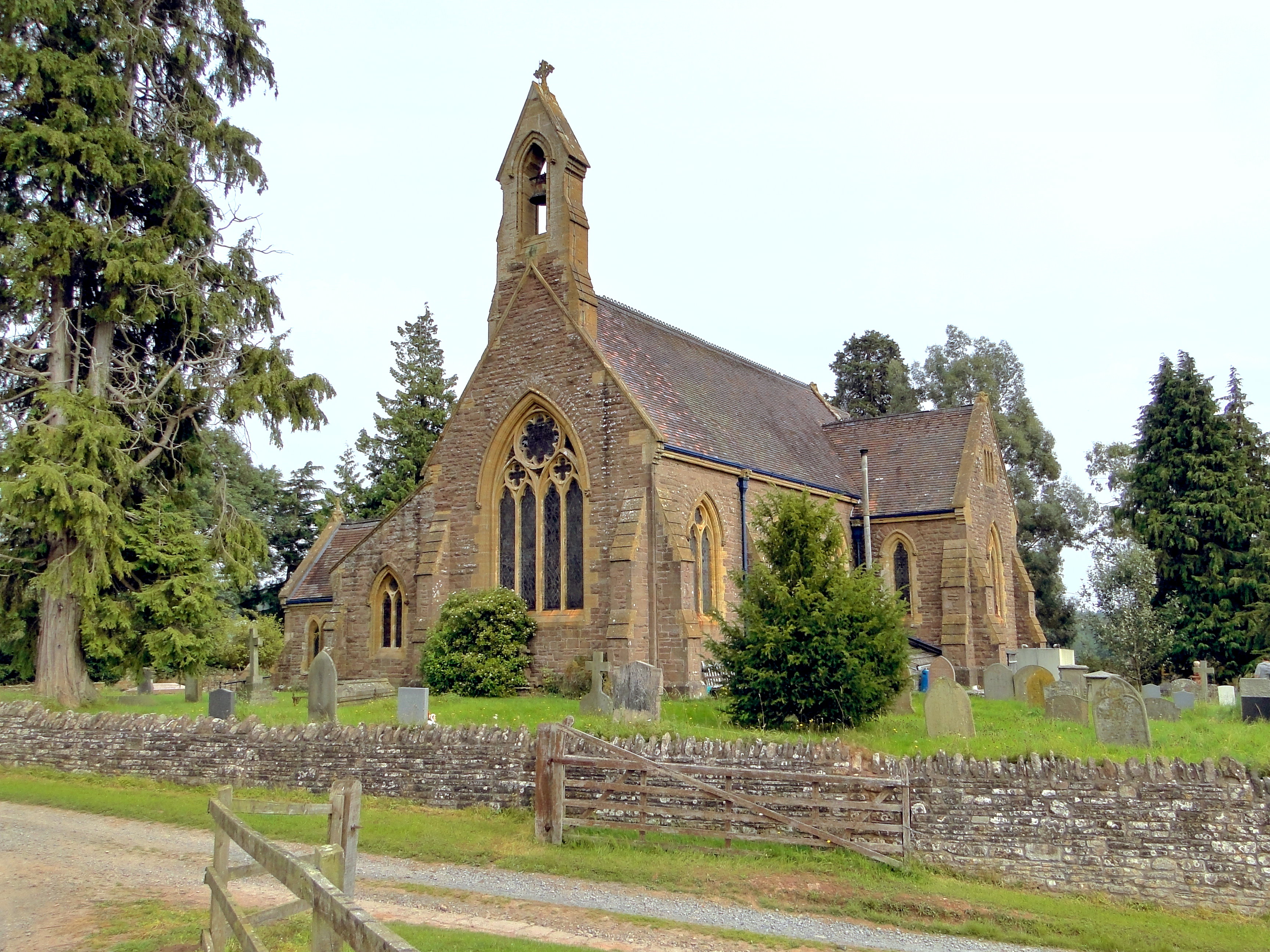
- St Mary's Church, Little Birch

- Location within Herefordshire
- OS grid reference: SO510318
  - London: 115 mi (185 km) ESE
- Unitary authority: Herefordshire
- Ceremonial county: Herefordshire
- Region: West Midlands
- Country: England
- Sovereign state: United Kingdom
- Post town: Hereford
- Postcode district: HR2
- Police: West Mercia
- Fire: Hereford and Worcester
- Ambulance: West Midlands
- UK Parliament: Hereford and South Herefordshire

Little Birch is a hamlet and civil parish in Herefordshire, England. It is approximately 5 miles (8 km) south from the city and county town of Hereford and 7 miles (11 km) north-west from the market town of Ross-on-Wye. The parish is significant for its Grade II* listed church, and Athelstan Wood, formerly anciently managed but now largely coniferised.

== History ==
Little Birch is listed in the Domesday Book of 1086 as a manor combined with Much Birch in the Hundred of Archenfield, and one of the smallest in the survey, with one Welshman and four lord's ploughlands. Lord in 1066 was Costelin, whose son became lord in 1086 under Tenant-in-chief and king William I.

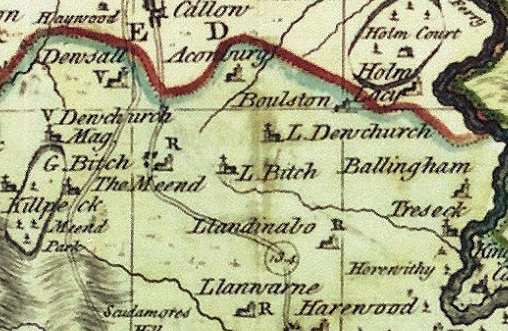
Little Birch (centre) in Wormlow Hundred (1755)

From at least before 1848 and at least to 1913, Little Birch was in the Southern division of Herefordshire and the Upper division of the Hundred of Wormelow and the Much Birch polling district. It was part of the union—poor relief and joint workhouse provision set up under the Poor Law Amendment Act 1834—and county court district Hereford, and the Herewood End petty sessional division. The parish was described as being "mid-way between the two roads from Ross to Hereford", 4 miles (6 km) north-east from Tram Inn station on the Newport, Abergavenny and Hereford section of the Great Western Railway, and 4.5 miles (7 km) miles south-west from Holme Lacy station on the Hereford, Ross and Gloucester Railway. In 1858 it was describes as being on the right (east) of the Hereford to Ross turnpike road. In 1858, letter post was through Much Birch, with the nearest money order office at Hereford. By 1876 letters were through Ross-on-Wye with money orders at Hoarwithy, and the closest telegraph office at Hereford. In 1885 1895 and 1913, the nearest money order office was at Much Birch; letter post was processed at Hereford, and then in 1885 and 1895 through the Tram Inn Regional Sorting Office, which in 1885 was the closest telegraph office. By 1895 and 1913 the telegraph offices were 7 miles (11 km) away at Wormelow and Hoarwithy.

The ecclesiastical parish was part of the rural deanery of Archenfield and the archdeaconry and Diocese of Hereford. The parish church of St Mary is described as of Early English style, of Ham Hill and Bath stone; a further source states stone was supplied from quarries within the parish. Rebuilt on the site of a previous church, but to an enlarged plan by Coleman and Sons to the designs of William Chick of Hereford, the church was consecrated in 1869. The rebuilding cost £3500, at the expense of the rector of 1855 to 1883. St Mary's comprises a chancel with semi-octagonal apse, a four-bay nave, north aisle, a north porch, and a bell gable with one bell at the west, a vestry, and stained glass windows by Harland and Fisher of London. Interior fittings include a restored Norman font dating to 1260, a bier dating to 1557, an organ chamber, and communion plate including a silver chalice and a silver paten cover inscribed "Letul Burche, 1576". The church accommodated sitting for between 2010 and 216 people. The church registers date to 1560.

In 1848 the incumbent priest's living was in the gift of Guy's Hospital, London and was a vicarage, which by 1848 had been discharged of tithes, being typically one-tenth of the produce or profits of the land given to the priest for his services, commuted in 1841 under the 1836 Tithe Commutation Act, and substituted with a yearly rent-charge payment. These rent-charges given to the priest were £160 in 1848 and 1885, and £133 in 1895. By 1858 the priest was a rector, until at least the First World War. In 1885 and 1895 support for the priest had was bequeathed in the gift of a previous and late rector. By 1913, the rector of Little Birch was also the vicar of Aconbury. Throughout this period, glebe, an area of land used to support a parish priest, remained at 14 acres (5.7 hectares).

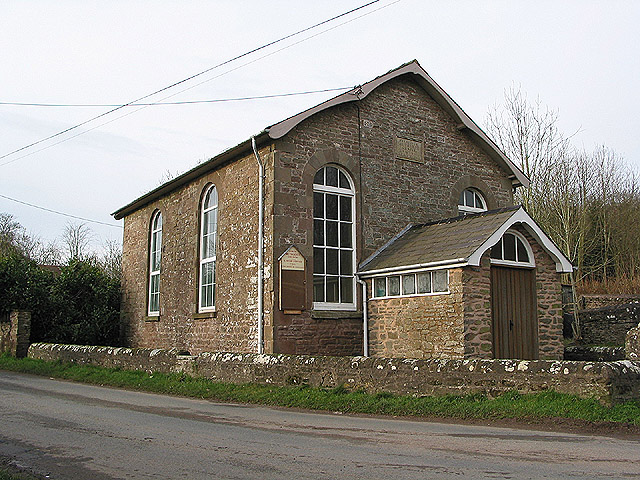
Methodist Church, Little Birch

A Primitive Methodist and a Wesleyan chapel existed in the 19th century, but by 1913 only the Primitive Methodist was listed. The parish school was built in 1857 as National School, but by 1913 it had become Public Elementary. The school, which also provided for the children of Aconbury parish, held 80 mixed children, with an average attendance of 30 in 1876; 58 in 1885; 50 in 1895, and 44 in 1913.

Parish land is described as arable with pasture and meadow, the soil loamy with a 'rockstone' subsoil on which was grown variously wheat, barley, oats, turnips, peas and fruit. Land area in 1858 was 900 acres (360 hectares); in 1876, 1885 and 1895, 967 acres (391 hectares); and in 1913, 10,019 acres (4,055 hectares). Population of the parish was 375 in 1848; 402 in 1851; 336 in 1861; 291 in 1871, with 71 inhabited houses and 72 families or separate occupiers; 282 in 1881; 248 in 1891; and 239 in 1911. Principal landowners included the Henry Scudamore-Stanhope, 9th Earl of Chesterfield in 1876, 1885 and 1895, and Edwyn Scudamore-Stanhope, 10th Earl of Chesterfield in 1913. Lords of the manor were Sir Hungerford Hoskyns, 7th Baronet of Harewood in 1858, Mrs Stubbs of Harewood (Lady of the manor) in 1885, and Joseph Henry Parry of Harewood Park in 1913. Residents and occupations listed in 1858 included the rector, the master of the National School, two stonemasons, the licensed victuallers of the Castle Inn public house and the Little Castle Inn public house, a further innkeeper, a cooper, a carpenter, and fourteen farmers, one of whom was also a carpenter. In 1876 the rector was living at the rectory. There were nine farmers, one of whom was also the assistant overseer, another a cottage farmer, and another a haulier, a cooper, two shopkeepers, a baker, a tailor a hoop maker, and a stonemason. By 1885 there were now eight farmers, a tailor, a haulier, a cooper and only one licensee, this at the Castle Inn. In 1895 nine farmers were listed; one of whom was also a haulier, one also a butcher, and one an assistant overseer as was a parish wood cutter. A cooper, tailor, stonemason and licensee at the Castle Inn still traded, and there was a new listing for a shoemaker. Working together were two carriers—transporters of trade goods, with sometimes people, between different settlements—operating to Hereford on Wednesdays and Saturdays, returning the same day. There was a married couple as school master and mistress. In 1913 Henry Adkins MA, BCL, resided at both the Old Rectory in Little Birch and the New University Club at St James Street, London. A cooper, who was now an assistant overseer, was still a carrier between the parish and Hereford. Also listed was the licensee of the Castle Inn, a boot repairer, a mole catcher, and ten farmers. There was also the branch manager of King's Acre Nurseries.

== Geography ==
The parish borders the parishes of Harewood at the south, Llandinabo and Llanwarne at the south-west corner, the rest being Much Birch, Aconbury at the north and north-east, and Little Dewchurch and Hentland at the east. The closest villages are Kingsthorne, in the parish of Much Birch, bordering the north-east of the parish, and Little Dewchursh at the east.

Little Birch parish is long and narrow, and orientated north-west to south-east with a length of approximately 3 miles (5 km). Its widest distance, of less than 1 mile (1.6 km), is towards the north-west around Little Birch hamlet; its narrowest, of 900 yards (800 m), is at the centre at the south-west of Athelstans Wood. It is chiefly rural, of farms, fields, woods, and dispersed properties, with a more concentrated residential area at the north-west at Barrack Hill. No major routes run through the parish, roads being minor, or footpaths, bridleways, farm tracks and access roads to residential properties. The closest major road is the A49 to the east at Much Birch. The extreme south-east tip of the parish is within the Wye Valley Area of Outstanding Natural Beauty (AONB), edged at the north by the Llanwarne to Hoarwithy Laskett Lane. The stream Wriggle Brook rises beyond the north-west of the parish and flows as a tributary to the River Wye in Hentland. The Brook forms the border with the south-west neighbouring parishes of Much Birch and Llanwarne before crossing eastwards across Little Birch into the parish of Little Dewchurch, at which point a feeder stream to the Brook flows from the north-west at Aconbury and through Athelstans Wood, partly providing the border with Little Dewchurch. A further upstream feeder to Wriggle Brook flows at the south-west edge of Athelstans Wood from its source just north from Little Birch church.

== Community ==
Lowest level of local government is through Little Birch Parish Council, composed of five elected members. In March 2019 the council, in collaboration with Aconbury Parish Meeting (parish meeting a direct democracy through less than 200 residents), produced a neighbourhood development plan which drew up an assessment of the two parishes to assist any future development.

The parish is linked by bus route from Kingsthorne to Hoarwithy and Ross-on-Wye, and from Hoarwithy to Old Gore in Foy, with services provided by Stagecoach West. The closest National Rail station is at Hereford on the Welsh Marches Line, 5 miles (8 km) to the north.

On Pendant Pitch (road) at Barrack Hill is the Castle Inn public house. Other businesses at Barrack Hill include one for bed & breakfast and a computer seller.

== Landmarks ==
There are five listed buildings in the parish. The 1869 Anglican Church of St Mary by W. Chick on Ruff Lane is rated Grade II*, its churchyard gate piers and walls, again possibly 1869 by W. Chick, being Grade II. Other Grade II buildings are 1 mile (2 km) south-east from the church at Cider Mill Farm on the Wriggle Brook, being the 17th-century and later New Mills Farmhouse, with its associated 1801-dated barn, and granary with former cider house, both c.1800, and a store at the time of listing.

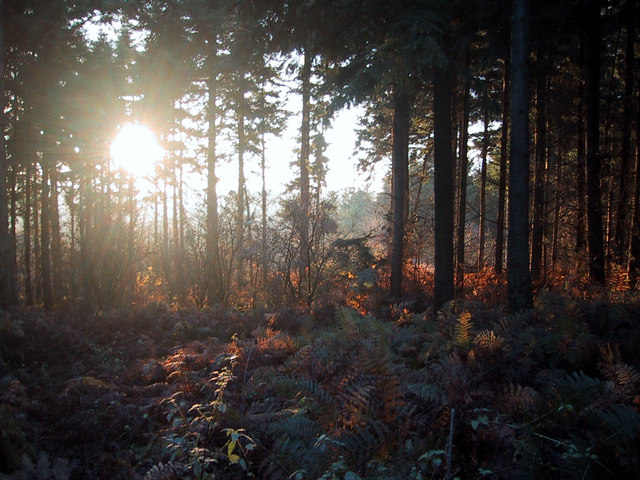
Athelstans Wood

At the north-east centre of the parish is Athelstans (or Athelstan's) Wood, rectilinear of 1,200 yards (1,000 m) by 800 yards (700 m) and extending to all but 100 yards (90 m) across the parish. The wood is conjoined at north to Rough Hill Wood in Aconbury parish. Athelstans Wood, named after Athelstan, Bishop of Hereford (died 1056), became a royal wood along with Aconbury Wood and Harewood. Aconbury Priory was established by King John, who gave priory nuns felling and selling rights to Athelstans Wood. Following the Dissolution of the Monasteries in the 16th century, the woods became the property of the Scudamore family, who until at least the 18th century coppiced the wood to make charcoal for fueling forges, while oak bark was used in the leather tanning process. The extent and characteristics of the wood remained the same from this time until after the Second World War, witnessed by aerial photographic evidence of 1946. Before felling from the 1950s, making room for the wide commercial coniferisation of the 1970s approved by the Forestry Commission, the woods were of lime and ash, with "oak and sweet chestnut trees and the sheets of bluebells and wood anemones under the coppice".
