= List of schools in Herefordshire =

This is a list of schools in Herefordshire, England.

== State-funded schools ==
=== Primary schools ===
- Almeley Primary School, Almeley
- Ashfield Park Primary School, Ross-on-Wye
- Ashperton Primary Academy, Ashperton
- Bosbury CE Primary School, Bosbury
- Brampton Abbotts CE Primary School, Brampton Abbotts
- Bredenbury Primary School, Bredenbury
- Bridstow CE Primary School, Bridstow
- Broadlands Primary School, Hereford
- Brockhampton Primary School, Brockhampton
- Burghill Community Academy, Burghill
- Burley Gate CE Primary School, Burley Gate
- Canon Pyon CE Primary School, Canon Pyon
- Clehonger CE Primary School, Clehonger
- Clifford Primary School, Clifford
- Colwall CE Primary School, Colwall
- Cradley CE Primary School, Cradley
- Eardisley CE Primary School, Eardisley
- Eastnor Parochial Primary School, Eastnor
- Ewyas Harold Primary School, Ewyas Harold
- Garway Primary School, Garway
- Goodrich CE Primary School, Goodrich
- Gorsley Goffs Primary School, Gorsley
- Hampton Dene Primary School, Hereford
- Holmer CE Academy, Holmer
- Ivington CE Primary School, Ivington
- Kimbolton St James CE Primary School, Kimbolton
- King's Caple Primary Academy, King's Caple
- Kingsland CE Primary School, Kingsland
- Kingstone and Thruxton Primary School, Kingstone
- Kington Primary School, Kington
- Lea CE Primary School, Lea
- Ledbury Primary School, Ledbury
- Leintwardine Endowed CE Primary School, Leintwardine
- Leominster Primary School, Leominster
- Little Dewchurch CE Primary School, Little Dewchurch
- Llangrove CE Academy, Llangrove
- Longtown Community Primary School, Longtown
- Lord Scudamore Primary Academy, Hereford
- Lugwardine Primary Academy, Lugwardine
- Luston Primary School, Luston
- Madley Primary School, Madley
- Marden Primary Academy, Marden
- Marlbrook Primary School, Hereford
- Michaelchurch Escley Primary School, Michaelchurch Escley
- Mordiford CE Primary School, Mordiford
- Much Birch CE Primary School, Much Birch
- Much Marcle CE Primary School, Much Marcle
- Orleton CE Primary School, Orleton
- Our Lady's RC Primary School, Hereford
- Pembridge CE Primary School, Pembridge
- Pencombe CE Primary School, Pencombe
- Peterchurch Primary School, Peterchurch
- Riverside Primary School, Hereford
- St Francis Xavier's Primary School, Hereford
- St James' CE Primary School, Hereford
- St Joseph's RC Primary School, Ross-on-Wye
- St Martin's Primary School, Hereford
- St Mary's CE Primary School, Credenhill
- St Mary's CE Primary School, Fownhope
- St Mary's Primary School, Dilwyn
- St Michael's CE Primary School, Bodenham
- St Paul's CE Primary School, Hereford
- St Peter's Primary School, Bromyard
- St Thomas Cantilupe CE Academy, Hereford
- St Weonards Academy, St Weonards
- Shobdon Primary School, Shobdon
- Staunton-on-Wye Endowed Primary School, Staunton on Wye
- Steiner Academy Hereford, Much Dewchurch
- Stoke Prior Primary School, Stoke Prior
- Stretton Sugwas CE Academy, Stretton Sugwas
- Sutton Primary Academy, Sutton St Nicholas
- Trinity Primary School, Hereford
- Walford Primary School, Walford
- Wellington Primary School, Wellington
- Weobley Primary School, Weobley
- Weston-under-Penyard CE Primary School, Weston under Penyard
- Whitchurch CE Primary School, Whitchurch
- Wigmore Primary School, Wigmore
- Withington Primary School, Withington

=== Secondary schools ===
- Aylestone School, Hereford
- Bishop of Hereford's Bluecoat School, Hereford
- Earl Mortimer College, Leominster
- Fairfield High School, Peterchurch
- The Hereford Academy, Hereford
- John Kyrle High School, Ross-on-Wye
- John Masefield High School, Ledbury
- Kingstone High School, Kingstone
- Lady Hawkins' School, Kington
- Queen Elizabeth High School, Bromyard
- St Mary's RC High School, Lugwardine
- Steiner Academy Hereford, Much Dewchurch
- Weobley High School, Weobley
- Whitecross Hereford High School, Hereford
- Wigmore High School, Wigmore

=== Special and alternative schools ===
- Barrs Court School, Hereford
- The Beacon College, Hereford
- Blackmarston School, Hereford
- The Brookfield School, Hereford
- Herefordshire Pupil Referral Service, Hereford
- Westfield School, Leominster

=== Further education ===
- Hereford College of Arts
- Hereford Sixth Form College
- Herefordshire and Ludlow College
- Royal National College for the Blind

== Independent schools ==
=== Primary and preparatory schools ===
- The Downs School, Colwall
- The Elms School, Colwall
- Hereford Cathedral Junior School, Hereford

=== Senior and all-through schools ===
- Hereford Cathedral School, Hereford
- Lucton School, Lucton

=== Special and alternative schools ===
- Cambian Hereford School, Leominster
- Compass Community School Hereford, Fromes Hill
- GEM Hereford, Hereford
- Hidelow Grange School, Acton Green
- Pathways School, Hereford
- Queenswood School, Ledbury
- Rowden House School, Bromyard
