= St Weonard's Church, St Weonard =

St Weonard's Church, St Weonards
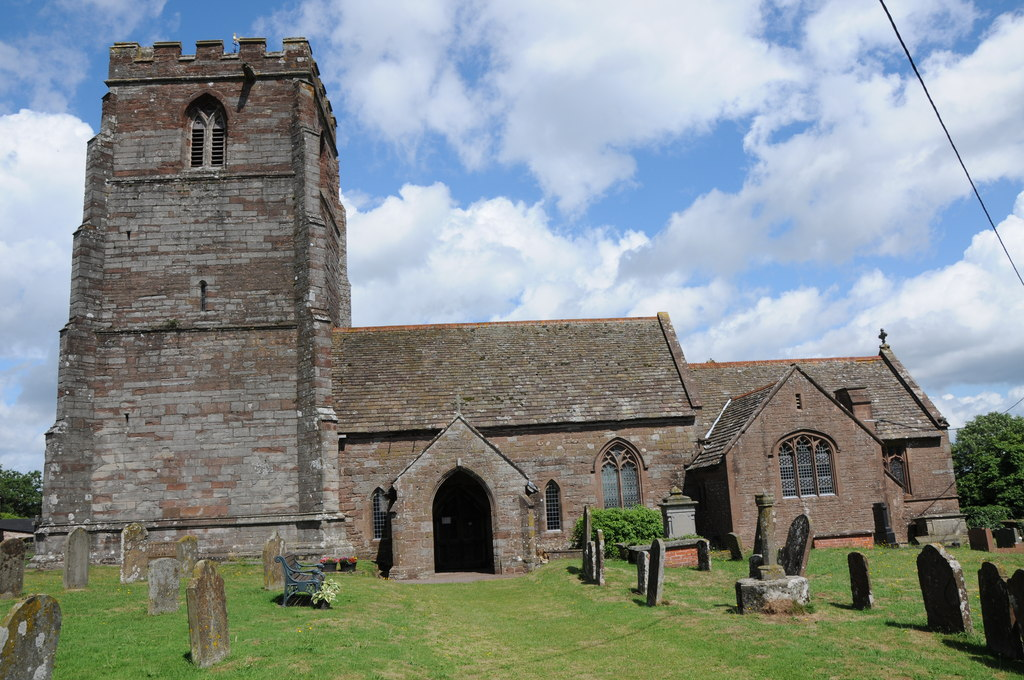
- St Weonard's Church, St Weonards
- St Weonard's Church, St Weonards
- 51°54′54.7″N 2°44′3″W
- Country: England
- Denomination: Church of England
- Website: stw.org.ul

History
- Dedication: St Weonard

Architecture
- Heritage designation: Grade I listed

Specifications
- Length: 89 feet (27 m)
- Width: 36.25 feet (11.05 m)

Administration
- Diocese: Diocese of Hereford
- Archdeaconry: Hereford
- Deanery: Ross & Archenfield
- Parish: St Weonards

St Weonard's Church, St Weonard is a Grade I listed parish church in St Weonards, Herefordshire, England.

== History ==
The church dedication to St Weonard is unique in England. It has been suggested that St Weonard is English orthography for the Welsh St Guainerth (or Gwennarth) and the Cornish St Gwinnear.

The nave dates from the 13th century. The west tower was rebuilt in the 16th century and the south porch, north chapel and north aisle and chancel largely date from the late 19th century.

The royal arms above the south porch door date from the reign of Queen Anne and bears the date 1710.

A subscription for restoration was raised in 1840 looking for £250 to £300 for the repair of the roof and repointing the tower.

In 1884 the chancel was enlarged, lengthening it by about 8 feet (2.4 m). A new south vestry and organ chamber were built. The restoration included the removal of the old high-backed pews and substitution with modern seating, the enlargement of the chancel arch, the blocking up of the south porch and its conversion into a vestry. The church was re-roofed (with the exception of the Mynors’ chapel) and the restoration came at a total cost of £1,996 (equivalent to £214,400 in 2025). The architect was George Vialls of London.

=== Mynors' Chapel ===
The Mynors' Chapel on the north side of the church is said to have been founded in 1521 as the East Window contains the inscription Orate Pro Bono Statu Ricadus Minoris 1521. It contains the family chapel of the Mynors family of Treago Castle and holds many memorials to them including a brass to Roger Mynors (d. 1684), Robert Minors Gouge (d. 1765) and twins Sir Robert Aubrey Baskerville Mynors (d.1989) Professor of Latin at Oxford University and Sir Humphrey Charles Mynors (d. 1989) Deputy Governor of the Bank of England.

The Mynors' Chapel was restored in 1875.

== Stained glass ==
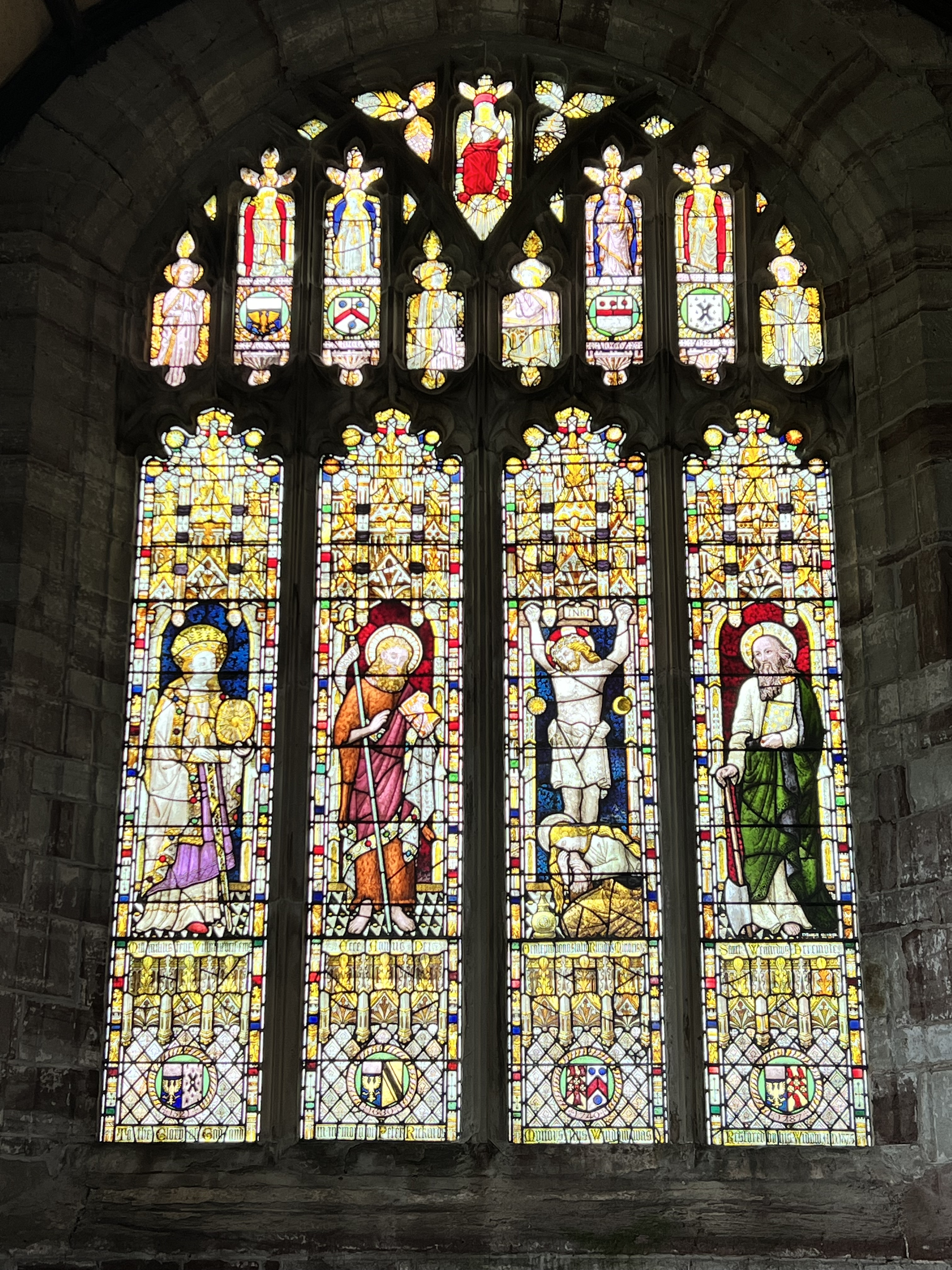
East Window, Mynors' Chapel, St Weonard's Church

The north aisle chapel contains a stained glass east window thought to date from the 14th century. It was restored in 1873 by Bailey and Mayer of Wardour Street, London. The four tiers from the top show:

- A figure in the centre at the top is Christ in Majesty showing his five wounds.
- St Margaret, St Catherine, The Blessed Virgin and St Helena.
- Hope with an anchor, two archangels (the second kneeling in adoration) and a figure with fettersemblematic of sin and bondage.
- In the four large lights are: St Catherine with her wheel and a double handed sword, St John the Baptist, The Crucifixion including Mary Magdalene, and St Weonard as a hermit.

The north aisle north window contains is a panel of stained glass surrounded by plain glass with The Calling of St Peter and Christ Walking on the Water. It was restored in 1968 in memory of Arthur John Neville Robinson, Vicar of St Weonards from 1931 to 1942.

The chancel east window was the gift of R.B. Mynors Esq in memory of his late mother, with the central subject being the Resurrection, paired with the raising of the Widow's Son and the raising of Lazarus.

Another chancel window was presented by the Phillpotts family erected in 1884 by Powell Brothers of Leeds.

== Organ ==
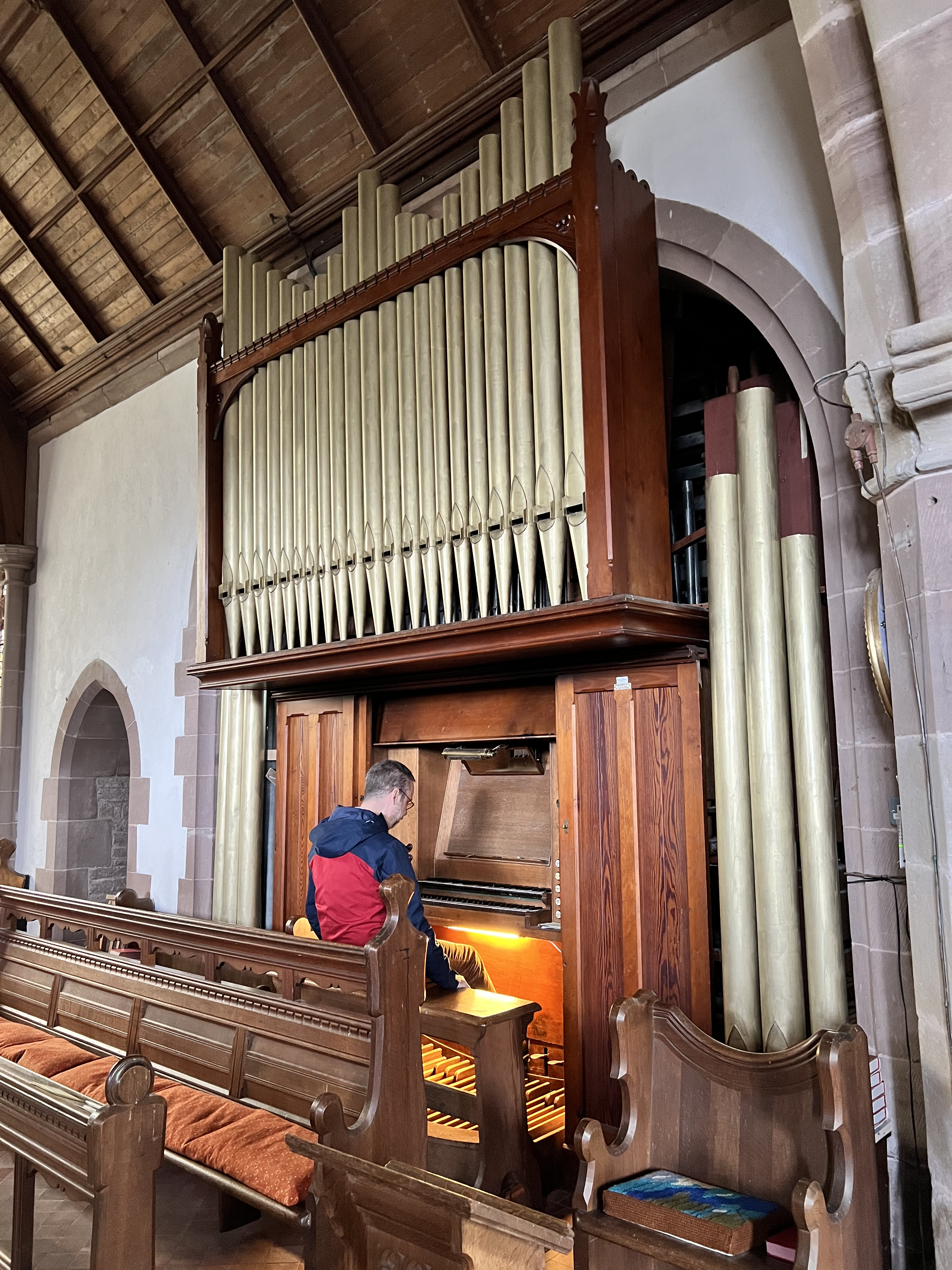
The organ on the south side of the chancel

An organ by Mr. Walker of London was opened on 8 September 1840 with the assistance of the Monmouth Choral Society. The organ combined a barrel and key movements.

The current organ (probably dating from 1885) is by Nicholson of Worcester and contains 10 speaking stops.

== Bells ==
The church tower contains 6 bells. Five were installed in 1801 by John Rudhall, with the sixth from 1882 by John Taylor and Co of Loughborough. The tenor weight is 591 kilograms (1,303 lb).

== Parish status ==
The church is in a joint benefice with six other churches:

- St Michael's Church, Garway
- St Dubricius' Church, Hentland
- St Catherine's Church, Hoarwithy
- St John the Baptist's Church, Orcop
- St Denys Church, Pencoyd
- St Mary's Church, Tretire

== Churchyard ==
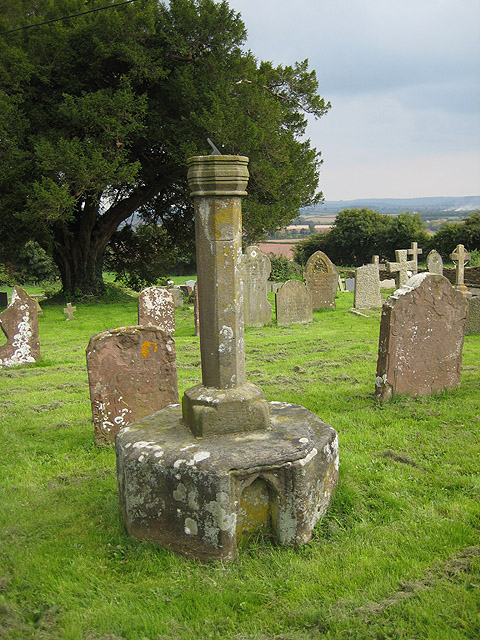
Churchyard cross, with sundial dated 1834, Grade II listed

The churchyard contains a number of listed monuments and tombs.

- Headstone for John Thomas, d. 1687
- Headstone with dedication illegible, d. 1691
- Pedestal tomb for William Phillpots, d.1722
- Chest tomb for Allice Haynes, d. 1827
- Chest tomb for Jon Pye, d. 1829
- Chest tomb for Richard Yeomans, d. 1833
- Churchyard cross and sundial
