= Ruth Sherlock =

English journalist (born 1987)

- Born: 28 April 1987 (age 39); Hereford, England
- Education: Durham University
- Years active: 2010–present

Ruth Sherlock (born 28 April 1987) is an English journalist. She is currently an international correspondent for NPR.

== Early life and education ==
Sherlock is from Hereford and grew up in King's Thorn. She is of partial Italian descent. She attended the Hereford Waldorf School and completed her A Levels at Hereford Sixth Form College. After taking a gap year, she went on to study at Durham University. During her undergraduate studies she received a travel award from Hatfield College that allowed her to visit the Middle East for work experience and complete a course in Arabic.

== Career ==
Sherlock began her journalistic career as a freelancer, and has spoken on the importance of building community with locals when working as an on the ground freelancer. She was working in the West Bank and Israel when she received word of unrest in Egypt. She traveled to Cairo, and reported from there on the 2011 Egyptian revolution before moving on to cover Libya's civil war. Her work in Libya was her first time working in a conflict zone. During her time in Libya, she filed stories with the Los Angeles Times and The Sunday Times. She also collaborated with Zoe Lafferty and Paul Wood on the 2012 play The Fear of Breathing: Stories from the Syrian Revolution. The trio clandestinely traveled to Syria to conduct interviews and collect research.

In 2012, she won The Press Awards' Young Journalist of the Year award and was hired by The Daily Telegraph as their Middle East Correspondent. While working for The Daily Telegraph, Sherlock covered the Syrian civil war. She reported on the Queiq River Massacre in January 2013. She met American aid worker Kayla Mueller in 2013, and followed her work up until Mueller was kidnapped by the Islamic State in August 2013. In 2014, Sherlock survived an attempted kidnapping herself while working in Yabrud.

In early 2015, Sherlock was made a U.S. editor for The Daily Telegraph. During her time that position, she covered the 2016 presidential election.

By 2019, Sherlock was working as an international correspondent for NPR. Her work with NPR has included covering stories relating to the Islamic State, and specifically relating to the women and children left behind by the group.

In 2019, Sherlock's reporting was used for the short series "How it Ends" on NPR podcast Embedded. The short series covered four families searching for members who had joined the Islamic State. The series was shortlisted for the Livingston Award in 2020.

== Personal life ==
Sherlock lived in Beirut up until 2023, but is now based in Rome.

== Awards ==
- 2012 The Press Awards, Young Journalist of the Year
- 2014 British Journalism Awards (shortlisted), for coverage of chemical weapons use by the Syrian regime
- 2020 Livingston Award (shortlisted), for "How it Ends" on Embedded
- 2024 Hard News Edward R. Murrow Award (Radio Television Digital News Association), shared with Awadh Altaie, Ahmed Qusay, and Larry Kaplow, for the story "20 Years after Abu Ghraib"
