= National Monument to British Heroes =

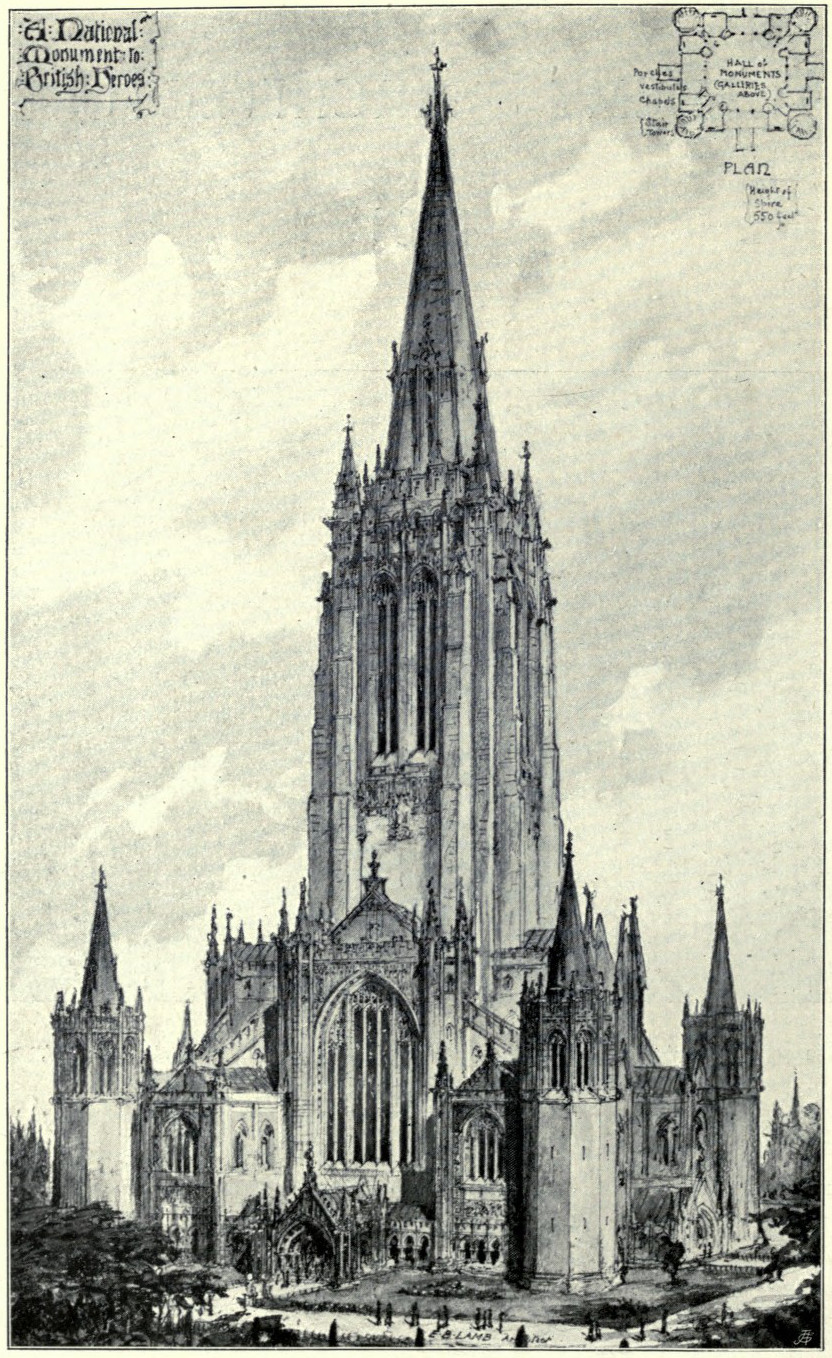
Lamb's proposed National Monument to British Heroes

A National Monument to British Heroes was a proposed Gothic Revival style hall and tower, entered as a design in the Royal Academy Summer Exhibition of 1901 by architect Edward Beckitt Lamb, and presumably to be built in London.

Building News commented, in their round-up of "Architecture at the Royal Academy": "an ambitious scheme ... a well-handled group of spires and Gothic features little likely ever to be built, but none the less able, and in some ways ideal."

Alex Bremner, Professor of Architectural History at the University of Edinburgh, notes similarities with an 1834 proposal by Sydney Smirke for a national mausoleum in Hyde Park; and echoes of continental monuments including Walhalla by Leo von Klenze (1830-42) and various Berlin proposals by Karl Friedrich Schinkel from 1814 to 1821.

Edward Beckitt Lamb worked in conjunction with John Pollard Seddon to draw up a proposal, in 1904, for the Imperial Monumental Halls and Tower, to be built at Westminster, between Westminster Abbey and the Palace of Westminster. As with the 1901 concept, this too, remained unbuilt.
