= Bigsweir Bridge =

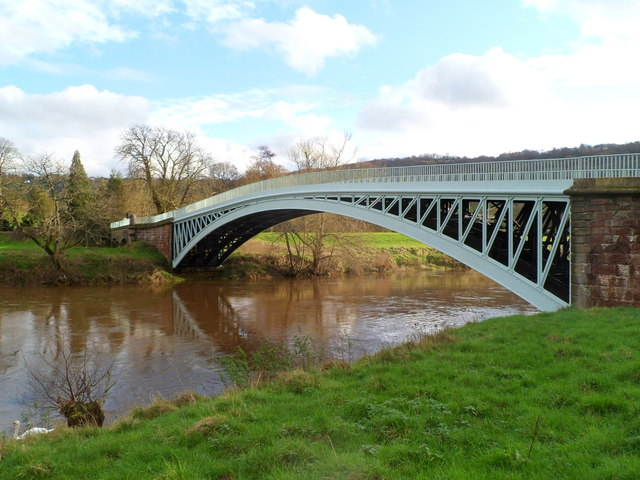
- Coordinates: 51.7428°N 2.6697°W
- Crosses: River Wye
- Locale: Llandogo, Monmouthshire, Wales

Characteristics
- Material: Cast iron
- Total length: 50.0 m (164.0 ft)
- No. of spans: 1

History
- Designer: Charles Hollis
- Construction start: 1827
- Construction end: 1827

Listed Building – Grade II*
- Official name: Bigsweir Bridge
- Designated: 7 March 1988
- Reference no.: 24916 (Cadw); 1186622 (Historic England)

Bigsweir Bridge is an 1827 road bridge crossing the River Wye, straddling the boundary between the parish of St. Briavels, Gloucestershire, England, and Llandogo, Monmouthshire, Wales.

== Location ==
The bridge carries the A466 road, and is located about 2 miles (3.2 km) north of the village of Llandogo, 2 miles (3.2 km) south of Whitebrook, and 3 miles (4.8 km) west of the village of St Briavels. It is the Normal Tidal Limit of the River Wye, and navigation below this point falls under the jurisdiction of the Gloucester Harbour Trustees.

== The bridge ==
The elegant cast-iron road bridge was built in 1827 as part of the new turnpike road constructed up the lower part of the Wye valley between Chepstow and Monmouth. The bridge connects the English and Welsh sides of the river, with an abandoned but recently restored toll house on the Welsh side. The bridge comprises a single arch of 50 metres (55 yd) , and was designed by Charles Hollis of London and cast at Merthyr Tydfil. A pair of stone flood arches were added at each end some years later, doubling the length of the bridge. Because of its narrow width, modern traffic using the A466 is controlled by traffic signals at either end.

Bigsweir Bridge became a Grade II* listed structure in 1988. In common with many bridges which cross country or county boundaries, it has two listings, the Historic England listing for the English side of the bridge, and the Cadw listing for the Welsh side. The bridge was repaired, strengthened and repainted in 2010–11.

== Locality ==
There is no village at Bigsweir. The bridge is about 600 metres (660 yd) upstream of the fishing weir and ford of Bigsweir, which is close to Bigsweir House. According to Sir Joseph Bradney, the weir, one of many of ancient origin on the river, was named after Buddig or Budic, the father of Euddogwy or Oudoceus, a 7th-century Welsh bishop who retired to Llandogo. Recorded early spellings of the name include Bikeswere and Brithekeswere.

Fishing rights at Bigsweir were mentioned in the Domesday Book. By 1331 the rights were held by the monks of Tintern Abbey, some 4 miles (6.4 km) downstream of the weir, and there were objections to the abbey raising the level of the weir and so impeding navigation. The rights over the weir transferred to the Earl of Worcester in 1537, later passing to his successors, the Dukes of Beaufort.

== Bigsweir House and estate ==
The Bigsweir estate, on the Gloucestershire side of the weir, was originally part of the lands of the Bishops of Hereford, before the freehold passed to Thomas Catchmay in 1445. It remained the main seat and estate of the Catchmay (or Catchmayde) family for several centuries.

Bigsweir House itself was rebuilt around 1740, probably by William Catchmay (d.1743). It is a building of two storeys built of sandstone, with a symmetrical five-bay front. Additions were made to the house after it passed to James Rooke (d.1805). The estate was enlarged by purchases of woodland, and the house itself was refurbished with rich internal decoration, including panelled rooms and elaborate cornices and architraves. Further extensions were added in the 20th century. Bigsweir House is a Grade II listed building, added to the register in 1954. The house was regularly used as a filming location in the Netflix series Sex Education.

== See also ==
- Bigsweir Woods
- List of crossings of the River Wye
- List of bridges in Wales
