= Listed buildings in Blubberhouses =

Blubberhouses is a civil parish in the county of North Yorkshire, England. It contains six listed buildings that are recorded in the National Heritage List for England. All the listed buildings are designated at Grade II, the lowest of the three grades, which is applied to "buildings of national importance and special interest". The parish contains the village of Blubberhouses and the surrounding countryside. The listed buildings consist of a barn, a milepost, a church, a house, a bridge, and a sundial in the garden of the house.

== Buildings ==
Name and location	Photograph	Date	Notes
Myer's Lair Barn; 53.99470°N 1.75343°W		Late 17th to early 18th century	A barn with an outbuilding in gritstone, the barn has a corrugated asbestos roof, and the outbuilding has stone slates. The barn has four bays, a plinth, quoins, and quoined jambs. It contains a cart entrance with the lintel missing, and three doorways, all with large lintels, and in the right return is a pitching door. The outbuilding is lower and has two bays.
Sundial south of Blubberhouses Hall; 53.99442°N 1.74730°W	—	1742	The sundial in the garden of the hall is in gritstone, and has an octagonal base and a square-section shaft. It is about 1 metre (3 ft 3 in) high, and on the northeast face are cut inscriptions. The gnomon is in bronze and decorated with scrolls.
Pace Gate Bridge; 53.98876°N 1.82321°W		Late 18th to early 19th century	The bridge carries a road over Pace Gate Beck. It is in stone, and consists of a single segmental arch. The bridge has voussoirs, pilasters, a band and a parapet.
Milepost; 53.99421°N 1.77793°W		Mid 19th century	The milepost on the north side of the A59 road is in cast iron on a gritstone support. It has a triangular section with a rounded head, and is about 1 metre (3 ft 3 in) high. The top is inscribed "SKIPTON & KNARESBOROUGH ROAD" and "TIMBLE", on the left side are the distances to Harrogate and Knaresborough, and on the right side the distance to Skipton.
St Andrew's Church; 53.99321°N 1.74529°W		1856	The church, designed by E. B. Lamb in Early English style, is in gritstone with a stone slate roof. It consists of a nave, a north aisle, a chancel, and a northwest steeple and porch. The steeple has a tower with two stages, stepped angle buttresses, tall lancet bell openings, deep corbelled eaves and a tall pyramidal spire with lucarnes and a finial. The entrance to the porch has a pointed arch with a chamfered surround.
Blubberhouses Hall; 53.99456°N 1.74726°W		c. 1856	The house is in gritstone on a plinth, and has a stone slate roof. There are two storeys and four bays, the first bay projecting and gabled with the upper floor corbelled, and the third bay having a projecting two-storey porch. The entrance has a chamfered surround, to its left is a bay window, and the other windows are chamfered and mullioned. Most of the openings are under relieving arches. There is another bay window in the right return.
