= Mynors baronets =

Baronetcy in the Baronetage of the United Kingdom

The Mynors Baronetcy, of Treago in the County of Hereford, is a title in the Baronetage of the United Kingdom. It was created on 24 January 1964 for Humphrey Mynors, Deputy Governor of the Bank of England from 1954 to 1964. The title is held by his son, Sir Richard, who succeeded in 1989, and who is a musician and conductor. As of 2017, he conducted Herefordshire Youth Orchestra.

The twin brother of Humphrey Mynors, Roger Aubrey Baskerville Mynors (1903–1989), was separately knighted in 1963. Both brothers lived at Treago Castle in their later years and are buried in the churchyard at St Weonards.

== Mynors baronets, of Treago (1964) ==
- Sir Humphrey Charles Baskerville Mynors, 1st Baronet (1903–1989)
- Sir Richard Baskerville Mynors, 2nd Baronet (born 1947)

There is no heir to the baronetcy.

== Arms ==
Coat of arms of Mynors baronets
Escutcheon Sable an eagle displayed Or beaked and membered Gules on a chief Azure bordered Argent a chevron between two crescents in chief and a rose in base of the last. Motto Spero Ut Fidelis
