= Blubberhouses =

Village and civil parish in North Yorkshire, England

Coordinates: 53°59′42″N 1°44′39″W

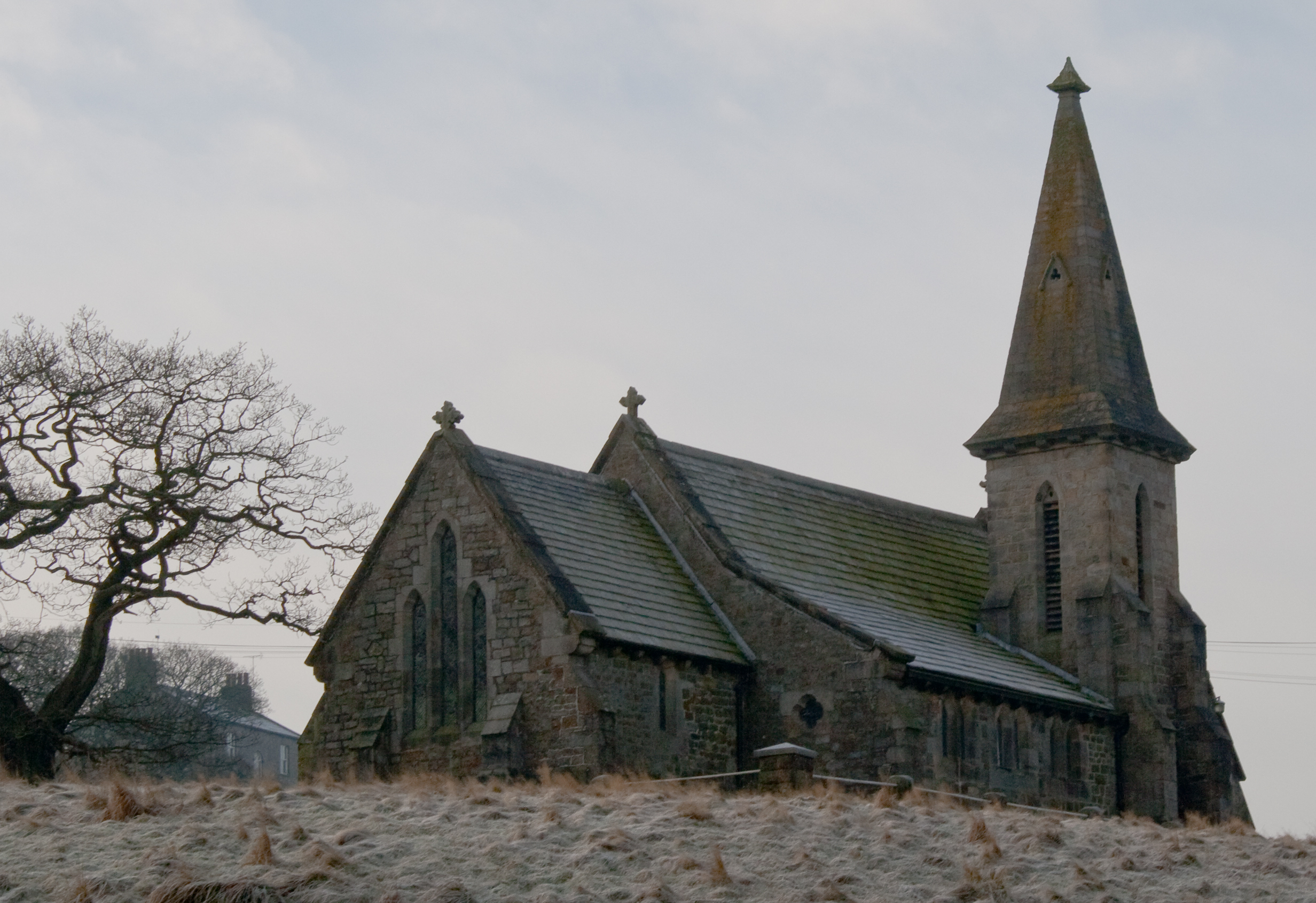
- St Andrew's Church

- Location within North Yorkshire
- Population: 40 (2015 NYCC)
- OS grid reference: SE167553
  - London: 180 mi (290 km) SSE
- Unitary authority: North Yorkshire
- Ceremonial county: North Yorkshire
- Region: Yorkshire and the Humber
- Country: England
- Sovereign state: United Kingdom
- Post town: OTLEY
- Postcode district: LS21
- Dialling code: 01943
- Police: North Yorkshire
- Fire: North Yorkshire
- Ambulance: Yorkshire
- UK Parliament: Skipton and Ripon

Blubberhouses is a small village and civil parish in the Washburn Valley, in North Yorkshire, England. The population as at the 2011 Census was fewer than 100 so details were included in the civil parish of Fewston. In 2015 North Yorkshire County Council estimated the population of the parish to be 40. Blubberhouses is within the Nidderdale National Landscape and is east of the Yorkshire Dales National Park. It lies on the A59 road linking Harrogate to Skipton and to the north of a Roman road and Fewston Reservoir.

== History ==
The name of the village derives from the Anglo-Saxon bluberhūs = "the house(s) which is/are at the bubbling stream", with a later regularised plural; the -um form came from the Anglo-Saxon dative plural case æt bluberhūsum = "at the houses which ...". Later forms of the name on record include "Bluburgh", "Bluborrow", and "Bluburhouse". A forge was recorded at Blubberhouses in 1227, and in the 16th century, the village had metal smelters for lead and iron ore. The lead was mined locally around Fewston. The other major industry in the area was cloth-working, with Westhouse mill being just across the A59 from the church. Westhouse opened in the 1790s to process flax but closed in 1877 and the stone from the mill was used in the construction of the dam wall of Fewston Reservoir.

St Andrew's Church, Blubberhouses was designed by Edward Buckton Lamb and built in 1851. It is now grade II listed. It is part of the ecclesiastical parish of Fewston and has been maintained by the Friends of Blubberhouses Church since it was decided to keep the church open in 2015 in spite of the need to repair the church roof at quite a cost. The village has a cricket team in the Theakston Nidderdale League, and their ground is beside the River Washburn in the village.

The road through Blubberhouses, now the A59, runs east-west and was turnpiked in the 1770s. The section to the west of Blubberhouses towards Skipton goes over Blubberhouses Moor, and between 1823 and 1827 a new cut was made to the south with a gentler gradient but following the contours of the hill. The 19th-century section has suffered many landslips, and so a new bypass, following the route of the original turnpike, opened in June 2026.

In July 2014 Stage 2 of the 2014 Tour de France, from York to Sheffield, passed through the village. It was also the location of the first climb of the stage, the Category 4 Côte de Blubberhouses, at the 47 kilometres (29 mi) point. It was 1.8 kilometres (1.1 mi) long with an average gradient of 6.1%. The single point for the King of the Mountains competition was claimed by a Frenchman, Cyril Lemoine of Cofidis.

Blubberhouses is used as a key setting for local composer Andy Tillison's composition Le Sacré du Travail, a five-movement electric sinfonia recorded by the progressive-rock ensemble The Tangent. According to the CD sleeve notes the work is loosely based around Igor Stravinsky's Le Sacré du Printemps (The Rite of Spring). One section of the second movement is named Dawn at Blubberhouses and the village is mentioned by name in the lyrics/libretto. A short story on the CD sleeve describes the journey of a man travelling to work through the village in the small hours of the morning. The CD album was released in 2013 by the German record label Inside Out Music.

== Governance ==
There is no record of Blubberhouses in Domesday Book but it is recorded in 1172 as Bluberh(o)usum, being in the lower division of the wapentake of Claro in the West Riding of Yorkshire. From 1974 to 2023 it was part of the Borough of Harrogate and is now administered by the unitary North Yorkshire Council. At the 1901 census the size of the parish was recorded as 3,736 acres (1,512 ha), and in 2021 it was listed as 3,770 acres (1,524 ha). The village and parish are represented in Parliament as part of the Skipton and Ripon Constituency. In 2011 the population was estimated to be 30 and by 2015 had risen to 40.

Population of Blubberhouses 1801–2015
1801	1811	1821	1831	1841	1851	1861	1871	1881	1891	1901	1911	1921	1931	1951	1961	2001	2011	2015
120	129	126	118	99	83	87	69	77	73	64	46	45	42	37	29	N/A (Note: The population of Blubberhouses was included with the neighbouring parish of Fewston)	30 (Note: Estimated population.)	40 (Note: Estimated population.)

== In film ==
The 1970 film Wuthering Heights was filmed on location in the area.

== See also ==
- Listed buildings in Blubberhouses
- Listed buildings in Fewston
