= St Dubricius' Church, Hentland =

Church in Herefordshire, England

St Dubricius’ Church, Hentland
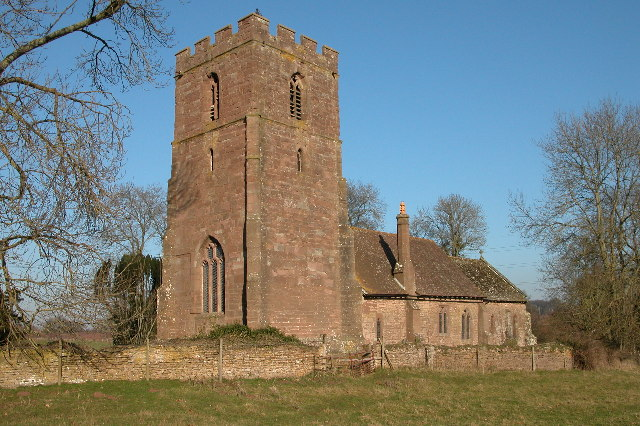
- St Dubricius’ Church, Hentland
- St Dubricius’ Church, Hentland
- 51°56′3″N 2°39′56″W
- Country: England
- Denomination: Church of England
- Website: www.stw.org.uk/Hentland-church/

History
- Dedication: Dubricius

Architecture
- Heritage designation: Grade II* listed

Administration
- Diocese: Diocese of Hereford
- Archdeaconry: Hereford
- Deanery: Ross & Archenfield
- Parish: Hentland

St Dubricius’ Church is a Grade II* listed parish church in Hentland, Herefordshire, England.

== History ==
Parts of the north wall of the church date from 1100 but the main body of it dates from around 1300 with late 14th and 15th century additions. The choir stalls with decorated poppy heads are said to date from the 16th century. The octagonal font with primitive head, fleurons & rosettes decoration is either late 15th or early 16th century. The pulpit dates from the 17th century but has been heavily restored. The sundial on south wall has an inscription to Annah Smith 1680.

The church was heavily restored by John Pollard Seddon in 1853 and the decorative scheme in the chancel was painted at this time.

== Stained glass ==
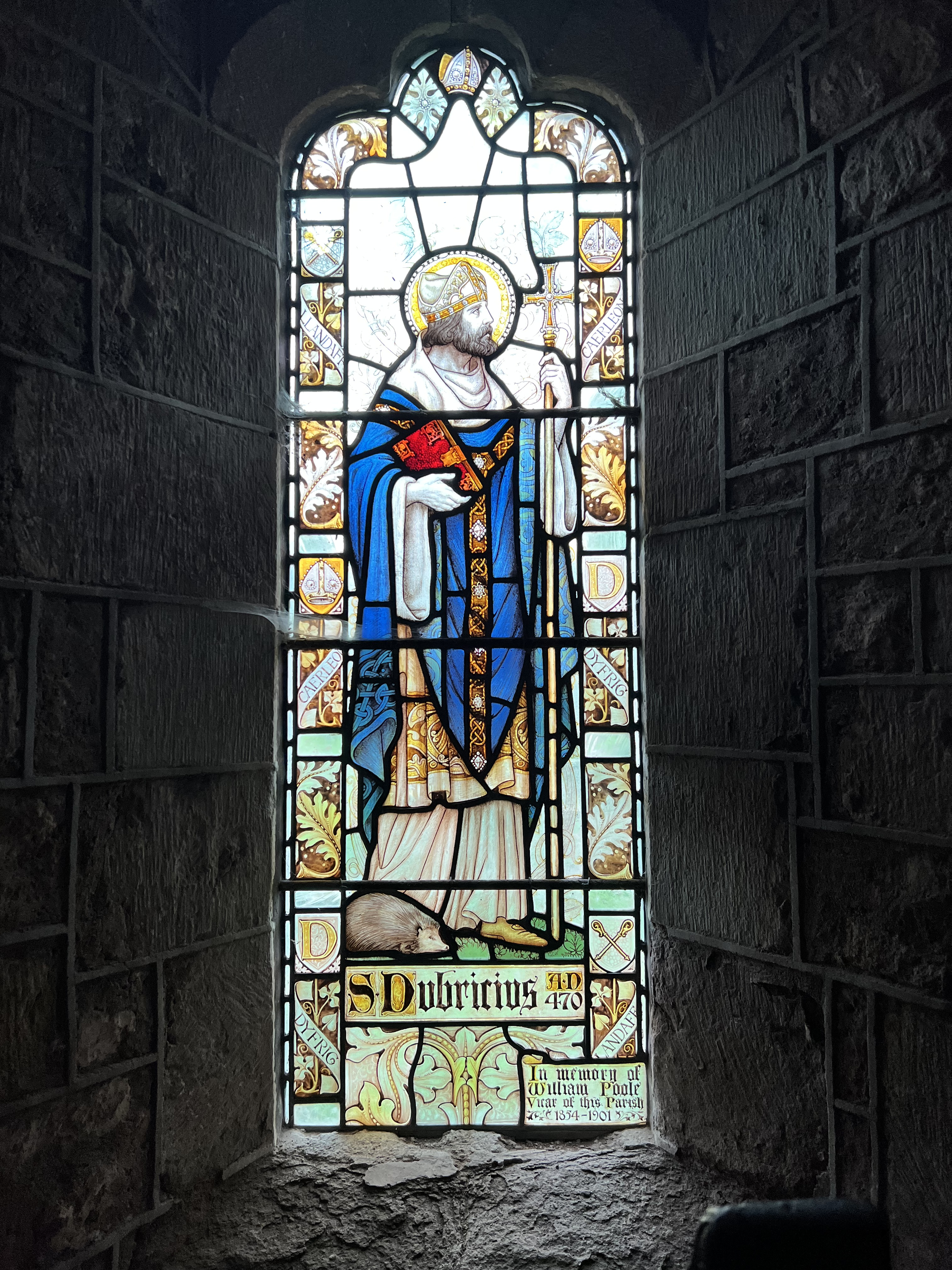
South aisle window depicting St Dubricius

The east window contains three figures of saints, thought to have been inserted in the 15th century by Richard of Rotherham, Chancellor of the diocese.

The south aisle contains a stained glass window depicting St Dubricius erected in memory to Rev. William Poole, vicar from 1854 to 1901. At the saint's feet is a hedgehog which were prolific in the locality and the emblem of the Herefordshire Yeomanry.

== Organ ==
The main pipe organ dates from 1869 and was given by Rev Thomas Symonds of Pengethley. and has been awarded a Grade I certificate by the British Institute of Organ Studies. It contains 2 manuals and pedals with 12 speaking stops. A specification of the organ can be found on the National Pipe Organ Register.

A chamber organ also sits at the back of the church.

== Parish status ==
Down to 1133 Hentland Parish formed part of the Diocese of Llandaff but is now part of the Diocese of Hereford. The church is in a joint benefice with six other churches:

- St Michael's Church, Garway
- St Weonard's Church, St Weonard
- St Catherine's Church, Hoarwithy
- St John the Baptist's Church, Orcop
- St Denys Church, Pencoyd
- St Mary's Church, Tretire

== Bells ==
The church tower a single unused bell dating from c. 1600 and a peal of four bells. The treble is of 1627 by Thomas I Hancox, the second of 1628 by John Finch and A H, The third dates from c. 1410 and was cast in Worcester. The tenor dates from 1760 and was cast by William Evans with a weight of 530 kilograms (1,170 lb). As of 2023 the peal cannot be rung as the tower requires strengthening.
