= Hoarwithy =

Hoarwithy can refer to:

- Hoarwithy, Herefordshire, an English village
- Hoarwithy (Viburnum lantana, the Wayfaring tree), a shrub of the genus Viburnum
