= St Catherine's Church, Hoarwithy =

Coordinates: 51.9613°N 2.6625°W

- Church of St Catherine, Hoarwithy
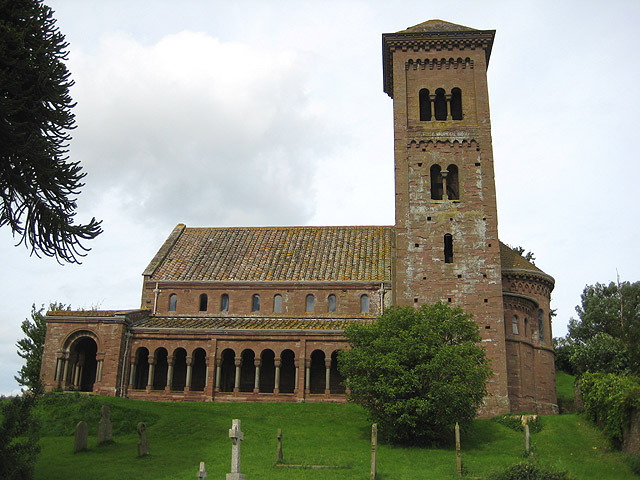
- Church of St Catherine, Hoarwithy

- Location in Herefordshire
- Location: Hoarwithy, Herefordshire
- Country: England
- Denomination: Anglican
- Website: www.stw.org.uk

History
- Status: Parish church

Architecture
- Functional status: Active
- Heritage designation: Grade I
- Designated: 26 March 1987
- Architect: John Pollard Seddon
- Architectural type: Church
- Groundbreaking: c.1870
- Completed: 1901

Administration
- Diocese: Diocese of Hereford
- Parish: Hentland

Clergy
- Vicar: Revd Elizabeth Davies

The Church of St Catherine is a Church of England parish church at Hoarwithy in the English county of Herefordshire. Alan Brooks and Nikolaus Pevsner, in the revised 2012 Herefordshire volume of the Pevsner Buildings of England series, describe it as "the most impressive Victorian church in the county." Designed in an Italian Romanesque style by the architect John Pollard Seddon for the Revd William Poole, vicar of Hentland with Hoarwithy, it is a Grade I listed building.

== History ==
The original chapel on the site dated from the 1840s. Poole considered it, "an ugly brick building with no pretensions to any style of architecture." Coming into his inheritance in 1870, he commissioned Seddon to undertake a total rebuilding. The building history is "unclear"; designs were exhibited at the Royal Academy in 1874, and the main building period appears to have completed between 1878 and 1879, although English Heritage records much work as post-dating 1885. Brooks and Pevsner consider that this may relate "largely to the internal decoration." Work has continued into the twenty-first century with the addition of the "Dubricius" polyptych by the artist Edward Kelly, and the restoration of the organ.

== Description ==
The church has an "imposing campanile" of four storeys, with the ground floor surrounded by an open arcade. The church is constructed from local Red sandstone, which encases the brick structure of 1840. A north porch is linked to the arcades of the campanile by a loggia. Historic England describes the design of the church as "eclectic Rundbogenstil [with] Byzantine, French, Venetian, Lombardic, Tuscan and Sicilian Romanesque influences." Simon Jenkins considers the church; "a complete work of revivalist art, rare for its date, an astonishing creation."

The churchyard contains five war graves, three British Army soldiers and a Royal Navy seaman of World War I and a Royal Naval Reserve officer of World War II.

== Parish status ==
The church is in a joint benefice, St Weonards, with six other churches:

- St Michael’s Church, Garway
- St Dubricius' Church, Hentland
- St Weonard's Church, St Weonard
- St John the Baptist’s Church, Orcop
- St Denys Church, Pencoyd
- St Mary’s Church, Tretire

== Gallery ==
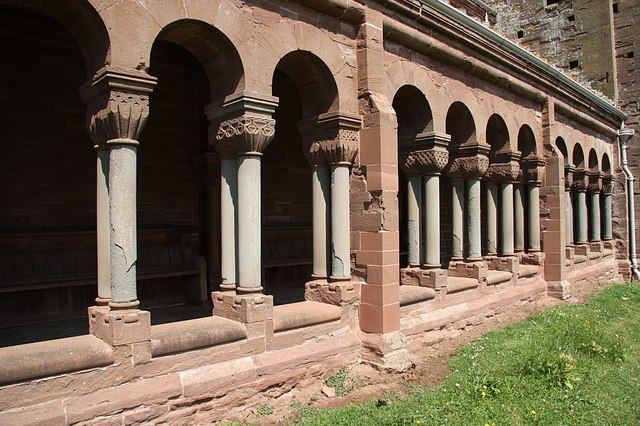
Loggia or cloister

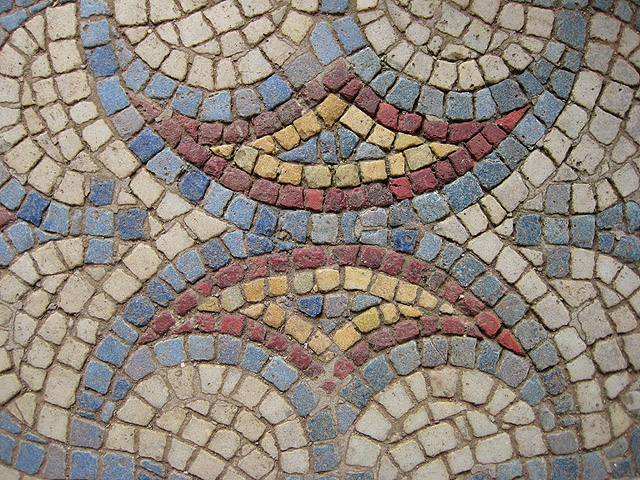
Floor mosaic detail

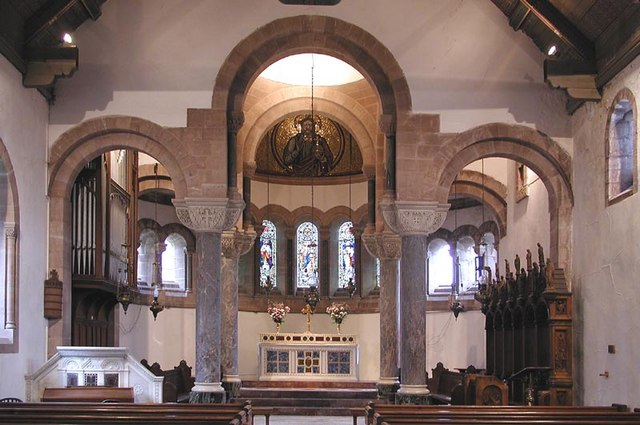
East end of the church

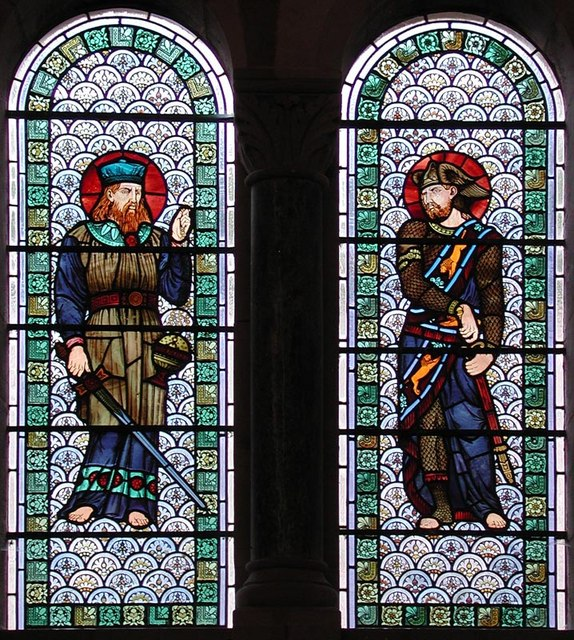
Stained glass

== Sources ==
- Brooks, Alan; Pevsner, Nikolaus (2012). Herefordshire. The Buildings of England. Yale University Press. ISBN 978-0-300-12575-7.
- Jenkins, Simon (1999). England's Thousand Best Churches. Penguin. ISBN 0-713-99281-6.
