= Humphrey Mynors =

Sir Humphrey Charles Baskerville Mynors, 1st Baronet (28 July 1903 – 25 May 1989), was Deputy Governor of the Bank of England from 1954 to 1964. He was previously a Director of the Bank of England from March 1949 to 1954 and Deputy Secretary starting in 1938. He subsequently served as the Chairman of the Finance Corporation for Industry and the inaugural Chairman of the Panel on Takeovers and Mergers.

Mynors was educated at Marlborough College, and received a BA from Corpus Christi College, Cambridge in 1926 (subsequently promoted to Master of Arts in 1929). He was also an assistant lecturer at Cambridge.

In October 1939, he married Lydia Minns, daughter of his fellow academic, Sir Ellis Minns, Disney Professor of Archaeology: the couple had six children.

Mynors' twin brother was Roger Mynors, a classical scholar. The brothers lived together with their families at Treago Castle in the latter part of their lives.

On his death in 1989, he was succeeded in the Baronetcy by his second son, Richard.

== Arms ==
Coat of arms of Humphrey Mynors
| Escutcheon Sable an eagle displayed Or beaked and membered Gules on a chief Azure bordered Argent a chevron between two crescents in chief and a rose in base of the last. Motto Spero Ut Fidelis |

Baronetage of the United Kingdom
| New creation | Baronet (of Treago); 1964–1989 | Succeeded by Richard Mynors |
