= Imperial Monumental Halls and Tower =

Edwardian architectural proposal for Westminster, London

Coordinates: 51°29′57″N 0°7′35.1″W

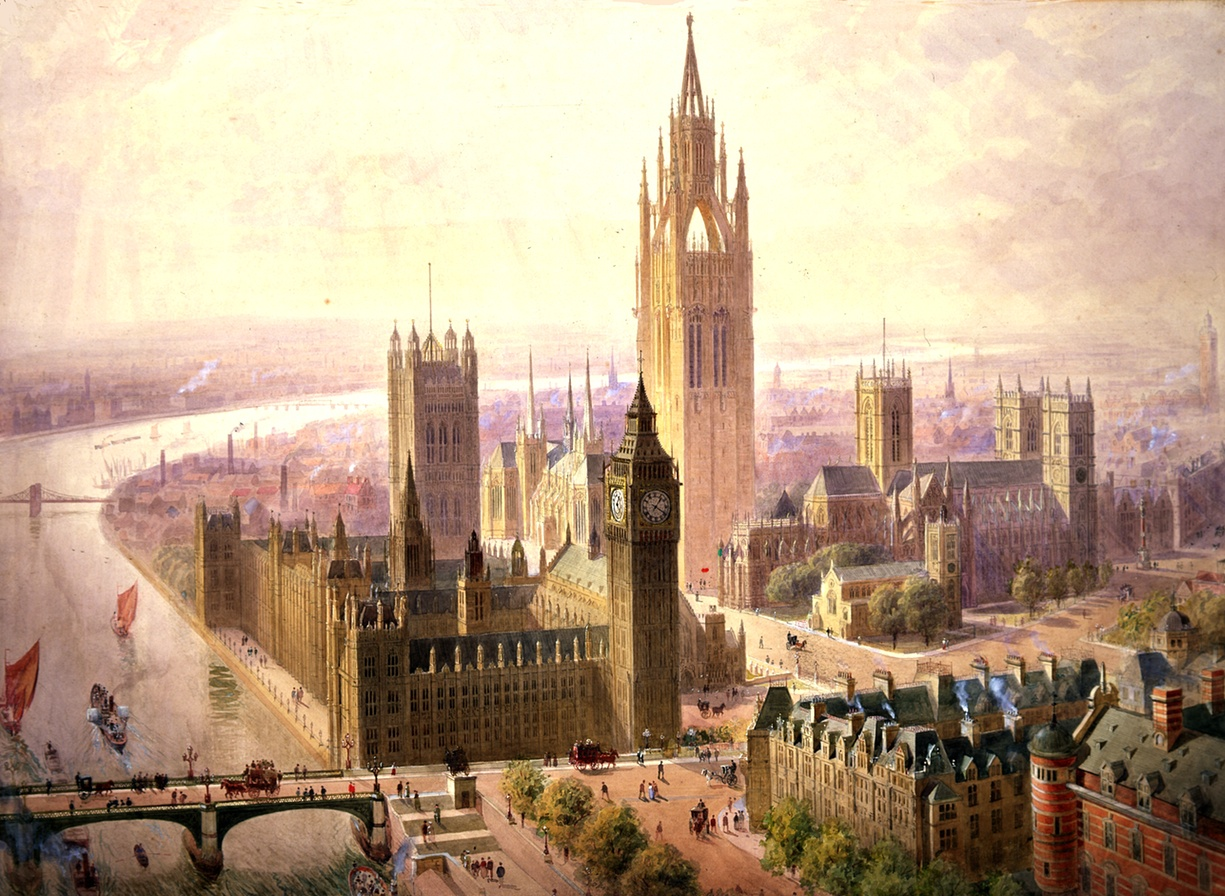
Lamb and Seddon's 1904 design for a new Imperial Monumental Halls. The Gothic Revival tower would have been the tallest building in the UK with a similar floor area to the Abbey next door. Several views from different angles were created.

The Imperial Monumental Halls and Tower was a proposed Gothic complex designed for a site in Westminster adjacent to Westminster Abbey. The plans, exhibited at the Royal Academy in March 1904, included a 167-metre-high (548 ft) tower that would have dominated both the Elizabeth Tower and Victoria Tower of the nearby Houses of Parliament. It was never built.

The design by John Pollard Seddon (then diocesan architect for London) and Edward Beckitt Lamb (son of Edward Buckton Lamb) was based on earlier schemes that each had proposed separately - such as the National Monument to British Heroes - and was one of many extensions proposed for Westminster Abbey in the late 19th and early 20th centuries by architects such as George Gilbert Scott, George John Shaw Lefevre, James Fergusson, and Henry Travis. In particular, the clergy at the abbey were concerned that it was becoming crowded with monuments, and more space was needed. Some of the proposed designs were considered by a Royal Commission in 1891. The issue was given added impetus after the coronation of King Edward VII and Queen Alexandra in August 1902, by a desire for Westminster Abbey to become a fitting Imperial monument, to compete with the baroque St Paul's Cathedral where Queen Victoria had commemorated her Diamond Jubilee in 1897.

The architects aspired to create a grand and expensive monument to "form a worthy centre to the metropolis of the Empire 'upon which the sun never sets'".

The complex was planned to be joined to the Great Cloister of Westminster Abbey, leading to a 65-foot-wide (20 m) reception hall beneath the tower, with the main body of the building – the Great Monumental Hall – stretching 192 feet (59 m) south from Old Palace Yard along Abingdon Street towards Great College Street, and incorporating smaller side halls. The halls would have ended with a double transept at the south end, 157 feet (48 m) wide and 47 feet (14 m) deep. It would have covered much of the area that is now College Green.

The soaring Memorial Tower included a high-level open ambulatory, surmounted by a corona topped by a lantern with bells. It was intended to hold monuments and imperial trophies in galleries on the lower floors, with archives on the upper floors.

It would have been the tallest building in the United Kingdom, significantly higher than the 111 metres (364 ft) dome of St Paul's Cathedral. The complex would have had a similar floor area to Westminster Abbey, and would have overshadowed the Houses of Parliament close by.

The scheme of work would have included the completion of the tower over the crossing at Westminster Abbey. The Builder magazine commented that "the immense scale proposed for the tower has a little too much of the "megalomania" about it."
