= Paul Wood (journalist) =

British journalist

Paul Wood is a British journalist. He is the World Affairs correspondent for the BBC. He was previously the defence and Middle East correspondent.

== Early life ==
Paul Wood graduated from the London School of Economics, where he received a bachelor's degree in political science.

== Career ==
Wood reported from Afghanistan, Croatia, Bosnia, and Macedonia, Chechnya, Algeria, Libya, Saudi Arabia, and Sudan, including Darfur. He was the BBC's Belgrade reporter, filing stories from behind Serbian lines while travelling with Kosovar guerrillas during the NATO bombing campaign in June 1999.

Wood was in Baghdad during the 2003 invasion of Iraq and in Fallujah during the 2004 battle for the city. In 2004 he covered the devastating suicide bombings on pilgrims in Karbala.

In August 2011, he was in Libya, covering the advance of the protestors' troops against Gaddafi. In February 2012, Wood covered the fighting in the Syrian Civil War, reporting from the outskirts of the city of Homs with rebel fighters. also collaborated with Zoe Lafferty and Ruth Sherlock on the 2012 stage play The Fear of Breathing: Stories from the Syrian Revolution. The trio clandestinely traveled to Syria to conduct interviews and collect research.

== Awards ==
In 2004, his Iraq War coverage won both the television prize at the Bayeux-Calvados Awards for war correspondents and a Golden Nymph Award at the Monte Carlo television festival. He received the Cutting Edge Award 2012 at the eighth International Media Awards.

Wood is an Eric & Wendy Schmidt Fellow who has received many other awards: "His stories have won two Emmys, a Peabody, and he was twice awarded the US Radio and TV Correspondents' Association David Bloom award for foreign reporting. He was also the UK Foreign Press Association's journalist of the year."
