= Kivernoll =

Hamlet in Herefordshire, England

Coordinates: 51.987°N 2.776°W

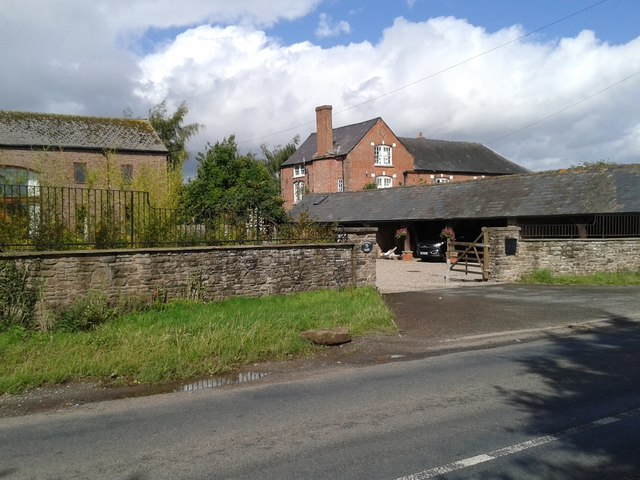
Converted farm

Kivernoll (originally Kiverknoll) is a hamlet in the county of Herefordshire, England. It is part of Much Dewchurch parish. Kivernoll consists of a small number of houses along the B4348, with settlement stretching along the unclassified road to Kilpeck and the byway to Dewsall known as The Rhydd.

Kivernoll listed buildings include an 18th-century stable.

There is a one span bridge over the Worm brook constructed in 1823 by a contractor called John Parsons.

There was a Primitive Methodist chapel at the Rhydd, Kivernoll but it has since been converted into a house.
