= St Andrew's Church, Blubberhouses =

Church in Blubberhouses, North Yorkshire, England

Coordinates: 53.9932°N 1.7453°W

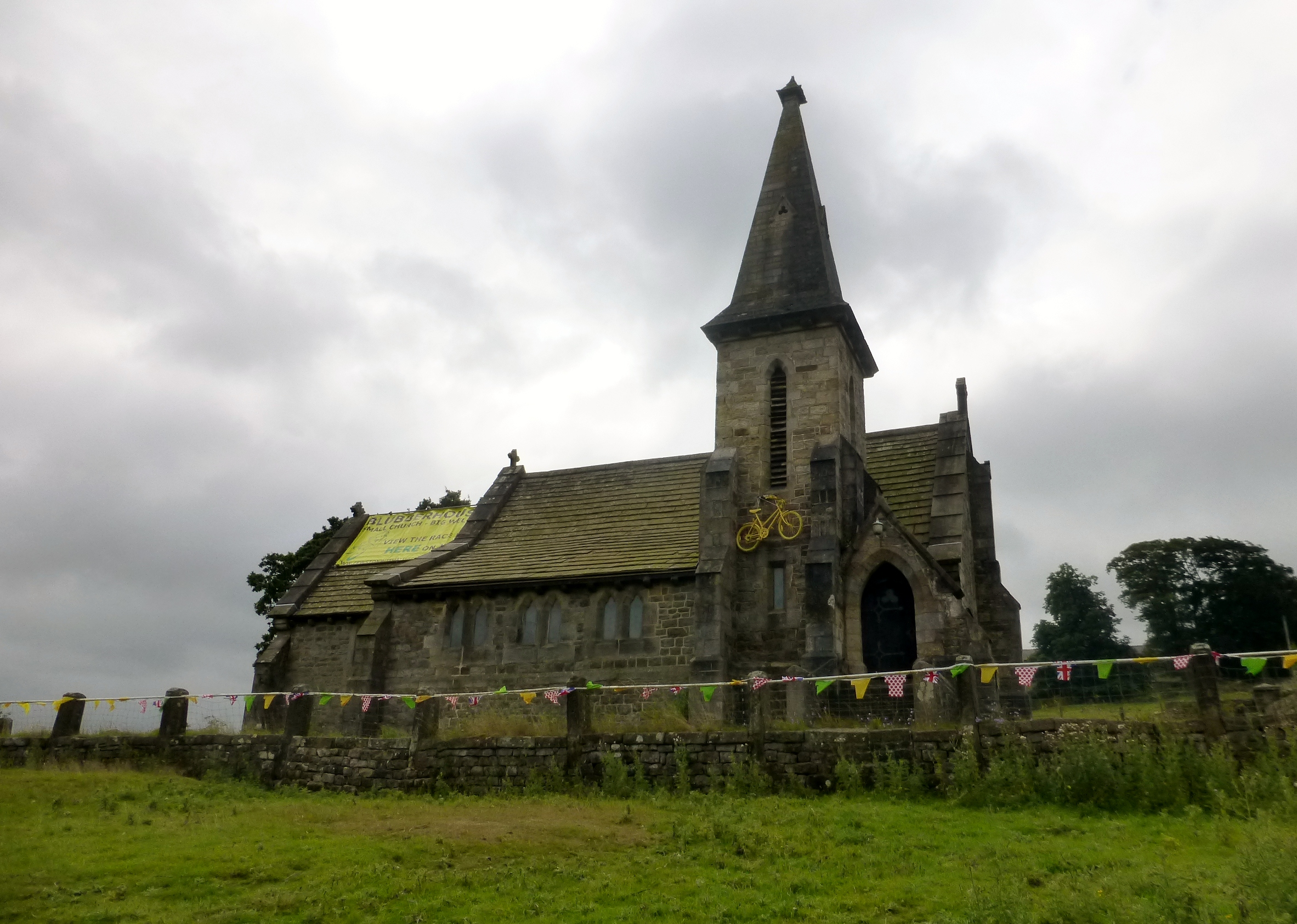
The church, in 2014

St Andrew's Church is the parish church of Blubberhouses, a village in North Yorkshire in England.

The church was commissioned by Louisa Frankland Russell, as a chapel of ease to St Michael and St Lawrence's Church, Fewston. It was designed by Edward Buckton Lamb in the Early English style, and was completed in 1851. The church was Grade II listed in 1987.

The church is built of gritstone and has a stone slate roof. It consists of a three-bay nave with a north aisle, a three-bay chancel, and a northwest steeple and porch. The steeple has a tower with two stages, stepped angle buttresses, tall lancet bell openings, deep corbelled eaves and a tall pyramidal spire with lucarnes and a finial. The porch is up seven steps, and is entered under a pointed arch with a chamfered surround. Most of the windows have trefoil heads.

Inside, the nave has a stone floor and oak pews, which were relocated from the old church at Thirkleby. There is a hammerbeam roof, with a king post structure, an experiment by Lamb to ensure that the altar can be seen from every location in the church. To aid this, the aisle is separated from the nave by a single pillar. The altar rail and pulpit are made of oak and date from the 17th century.

== See also ==
- Listed buildings in Blubberhouses
