= A466 road =

Road in England and Wales

A466
- Wye Valley Road
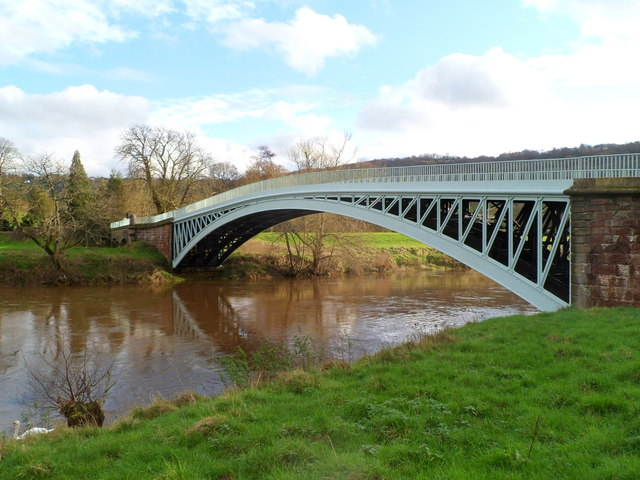
- The A466 crossing the River Wye (and the England–Wales border) at Bigsweir Bridge

Route information
- Length: 30.0 mi (48.3 km)

Major junctions
- North end: King's Thorn; 51°59′11″N 2°44′2″W
- A49; A40 A4136; A48 M48 Junction 2
- South end: Chepstow; 51°37′14.55″N 2°40′23.84″W

Location
- Country: United Kingdom
- Primary destinations: Monmouth, Chepstow

Road network
- Roads in the United Kingdom; Motorways; A and B road zones
← A465	→ A467

The A466, also known as the Wye Valley Road, is a road from Hereford, England to Chepstow, Wales via Monmouth, Tintern and the Wye Valley.

The road was largely developed during the late 18th and early 19th centuries by turnpike trusts in Herefordshire and Monmouthshire. It replaced the River Wye as the principal means of transport to Tintern before the construction of the Wye Valley Railway in the late 19th century. The A466 remains an important route for local residents and tourists, and now provides access to the Severn Bridge on the M48 motorway.

== Route ==
The A466 is about 30 miles (48 km) long and runs through the counties of Herefordshire and Gloucestershire in England, and Monmouthshire in Wales. It runs south from Kingsthorne, on the A49 south east of Hereford to Monmouth, crossing the A40. After crossing the River Wye at the Wye Bridge, Monmouth and Bigsweir Bridge near Llandogo, it follows a picturesque route south down the Wye valley through Tintern and Chepstow to the M48 motorway at junction 2. The road crosses the border between England and Wales at three places along its length: at Buckholt, Redbrook, and Bigsweir. It runs through an Area of Outstanding Natural Beauty, and is popular with tourists, offering good views of the area around the Wye valley.

Most of the road is maintained by the respective county councils except for the southernmost section from Chepstow to the M48, which is a trunk road and funded by the National Assembly for Wales.

== History ==
=== Turnpikes ===
Between Kingsthorne and Monmouth, the road passes through open countryside several miles to the west of the River Wye, and the villages of Wormelow Tump, St Weonards, Llancloudy and Welsh Newton. This part of the road was turnpiked incrementally in short stages in the late eighteenth century and became known as "The Great Road to the Town of Monmouth". The initial turnpike in 1730 ran as far as St Weonards, and was extended to Llancloudy in 1769. A tollhouse survives at Monkgate, Monmouth. The Wye Bridge at Monmouth has existed in one form or another since the Middle Ages. The current bridge was built in 1879 by Edwin Seward of Cardiff from red and bluff sandstone.

After crossing the river at Monmouth, the road passes through Redbrook, Llandogo, Tintern and St Arvans, in the deeply incised river valley, before reaching Chepstow Racecourse and the town of Chepstow. Until the early nineteenth century, the road between Chepstow and Monmouth passed through St Arvans, Devauden and Trellech (the current B4293); the riverside villages of Llandogo, Brockweir and Tintern, with their associated tourism, metalworking and shipbuilding industries, were more easily accessed by river. The route between Monmouth and Redbrook was part of the main road between Monmouth and Coleford.

The road between Crossway Green, just north of Chepstow, and St Arvans was improved soon after 1760 by Valentine Morris, the owner of the adjoining Piercefield estate, and again around 1800 by its subsequent owner Mark Wood. In about 1809, proposals were made to cut a new road along the valley, to improve access to Tintern in particular. Little progress was made until 1824, when legislation was passed "for Making a Turnpike Road from Redbrook to St Arvans" and a bridge at Bigsweir, under the authority of the Monmouth Turnpike Trust. The new road was constructed between St Arvans and Tintern in 1825, and by 1829 the road had been opened along its whole length. Bigsweir Bridge was opened in 1827 as part of the new road. Two turnpike houses from this period are still standing; one at St Arvans is Grade II listed, while another is by Bigsweir Bridge. The trusts were wound up in 1873, with control ultimately passing to the relevant county councils. The turnpike was superseded in 1876 by the Wye Valley Railway, which led to a huge increase in tourist traffic to the valley and Tintern.

=== Motor traffic ===
The southernmost section of the A466 is the Wye Valley Link Road, which was a project built in conjunction with the first Severn Bridge. It opened to traffic in 1963. The remainder of the road north of this is under local government control; the Ministry of Transport dismissed calls in the late 1960s for them to improve the road to deal with increasing congestion.
