= Hoarwithy, Herefordshire =

Village in Herefordshire, England

Coordinates: 51.96°N 2.663°W

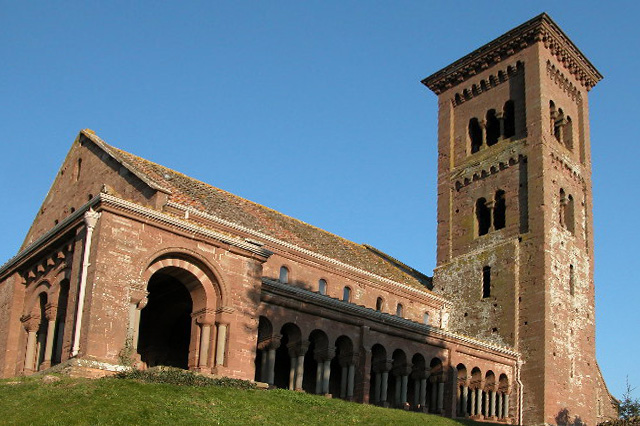
St Catherine's Church, Hoarwithy

Hoarwithy is a small village in the civil parish of Hentland, and on the River Wye in Herefordshire, England.

It is known for its Grade I listed church of St Catherine built in an Italian Romanesque style with detached campanile. The church, on a steep hillside above the village was built to a design by J. P. Seddon by William Poole, the wealthy Vicar of Hentland in the 1870s.

The village has one public house, the New Harp Inn, which is a CAMRA member and is adjacent to the River Wye.
