= Bigsweir Woods =

Biological Site of Special Scientific Interest in England

- Site of Special Scientific Interest
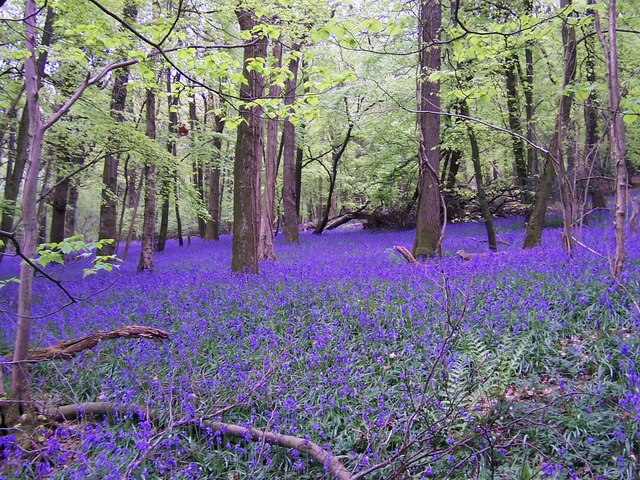
- Bluebells in Bigsweir Woods

- Location within Gloucestershire
- Location of Bigsweir Woods.
- Area of search: Gloucestershire
- Grid reference: SO546060
- Coordinates: 51.751297°N 2.658343°W
- Interest: Biological
- Area: 48.16 ha (119.0 acres)
- Notification date: 1984

Bigsweir Woods (grid reference SO546060) is a 48.16-hectare (119.0-acre) biological Site of Special Scientific Interest in Gloucestershire, notified in 1984. The site is listed in the 'Forest of Dean Local Plan Review' as a Key Wildlife Site (KWS) (including Wyeseal and Slip Woods).

The site is within the Wye Valley Area of Outstanding Natural Beauty and is part owned by the Woodland Trust.

Wye Valley Woodlands/ Coetiroedd Dyffryn Gwy are recognised as a Special Area of Conservation (SAC) under the EU Habitats Directive.

== Habitat and flora ==
The woods of the region are one of the most important areas of woodland conservation in the United Kingdom, being semi-natural woodland, and run continuously along the Lower Wye Gorge (which is also notified as an SSSI).

There is a rich mixture of tree types and rare and local species are present. Bigsweir Woods are sited on Devonian Old Red Sandstone and quartz conglomerate. This produces acid soil. The wood is dominated by Sessile Oak but includes some Beech, Small-leaved Lime and Birch. Hazel, Beech, Small-leaved Lime also make up an understorey with Rowan and Holly. Ground flora includes Bramble, Bracken, Ivy, Dog's Mercury and Bilberry.

Local herbs include Forester's Woodrush (Luzula forsteri), Bitter Vetch, Alder Buckthorn and Wood Fescue (Festuca altissima). There are seasonal carpets of Bluebell. The site supports a significant range of ferns.

== SSSI Source ==
- Natural England SSSI information on the citation
- Natural England SSSI information on the Bigsweir Woods units
