= Edward Buckton Lamb =

British architect

Edward Buckton Lamb (1806–1869) was a British architect who exhibited at the Royal Academy from 1824. Lamb was labelled a 'Rogue Gothic Revivalist', and his designs were roundly criticised for breaking with convention, especially by The Ecclesiologist. More recently Nikolaus Pevsner called him "the most original though certainly not the most accomplished architect of his day".

== Life ==
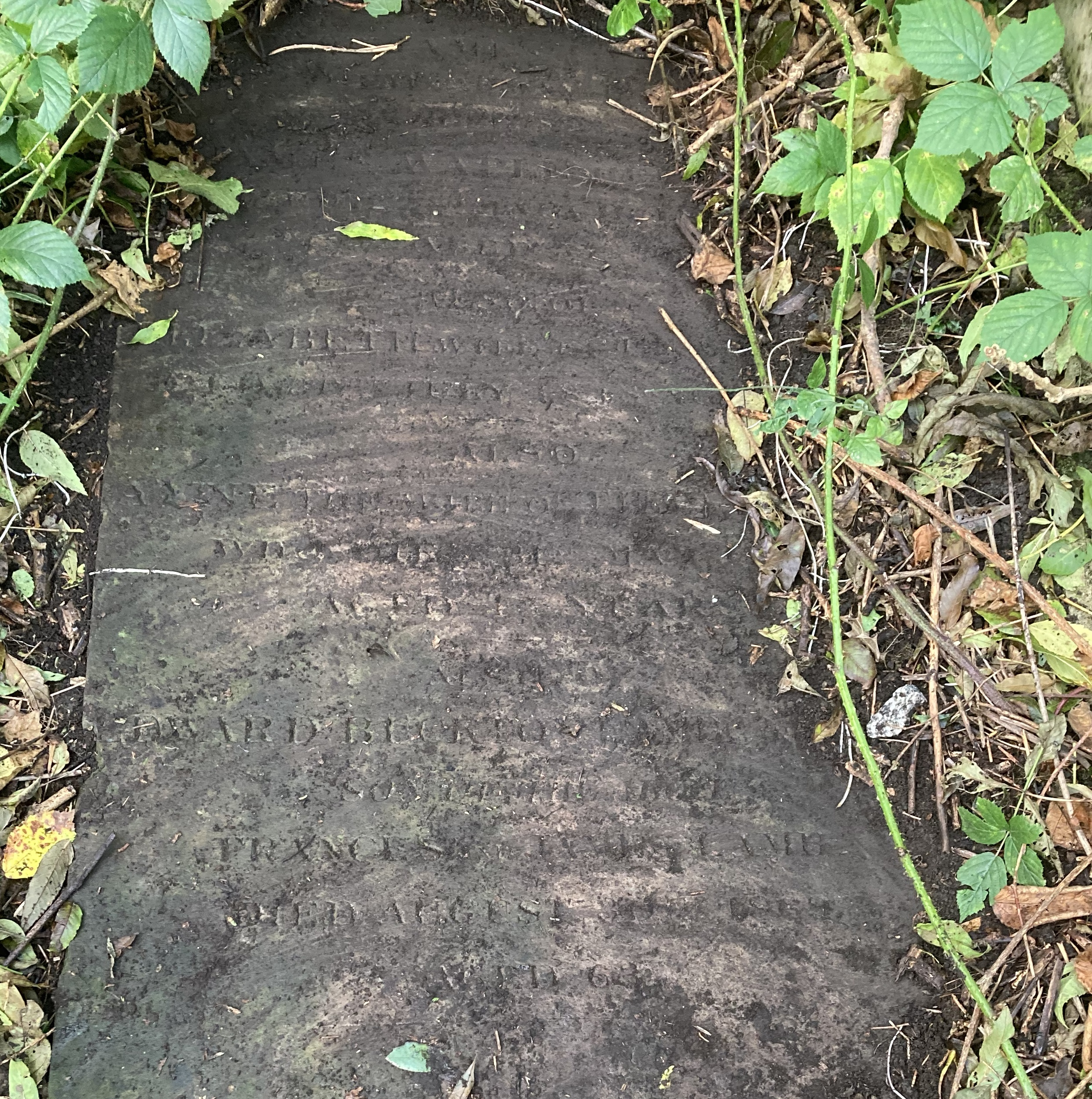
Grave of Edward Buckton Lamb in Highgate Cemetery

He was born in London, England, his father James Lamb being a government official. He was articled to Lewis Nockalls Cottingham.

He was selected to design the chapel for the Brompton Hospital, then being built to the designs of Frederick John Francis, and was retained to complete the main building, in collaboration with Francis.

He contributed to Loudon's Encyclopaedia (1833), published studies on Gothic Ornament (1830), Ancient Domestic Architecture (1846) with text by William Henry Leeds, and contributed regularly to the Architectural Magazine (1834–8).

He died in the summer of 1869 and was buried on the western side of Highgate Cemetery.

== Buildings ==
Notable buildings he was responsible for include:

- Brompton Hospital Chapel, London, and in collaboration with F.J. Francis, parts of the main Hospital building.
- All Saints' Church, Hartlepool
- St Stephen's Church, Aldwark, Yorkshire (1846–53)
- St Luke's Chapel, Brompton Hospital (1849)
- All Saints' Church, Thirkleby, North Yorkshire (1851)
- St Andrew's Church, Blubberhouses, Yorkshire (1851)
- St Margaret's, Leiston, Suffolk (1853)
- Christ Church, Hartlepool (1854)
- Berkhamsted Town Hall
- Episcopal Church, Dumfries
- Eye Town Hall
- Hrádek u Nechanic
- Disraeli Monument, Hughenden, Buckinghamshire (1862).
- St Martin's Church, Gospel Oak, London (consecrated 1865)
- St Mary Magdalene Church, Addiscombe (1868–70)
- Hughenden Manor, alterations for Benjamin Disraeli
- Nun Appleton Hall, Acaster Selby, Yorkshire (additions, since demolished)
- Wadhurst Castle
- St. Ninian's Episcopal Church, Castle Douglas, Scotland
- Carnsalloch Chapel at The Mount, Kirkton, Dumfries

== Gallery ==
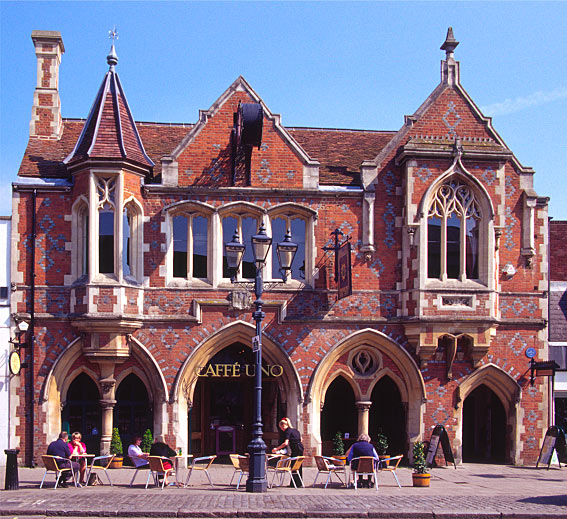
Berkhamsted Town Hall by Lamb.

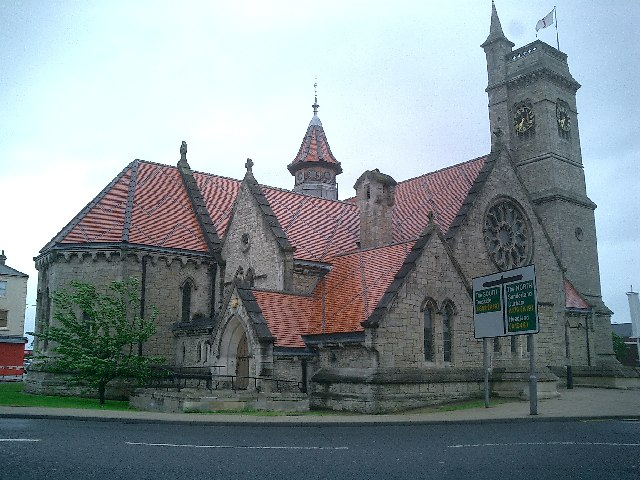
Christ Church, Hartlepool, designed by Lamb in 1854, now Hartlepool Art Gallery.

Hughenden Manor as redesigned by Lamb in 1862.

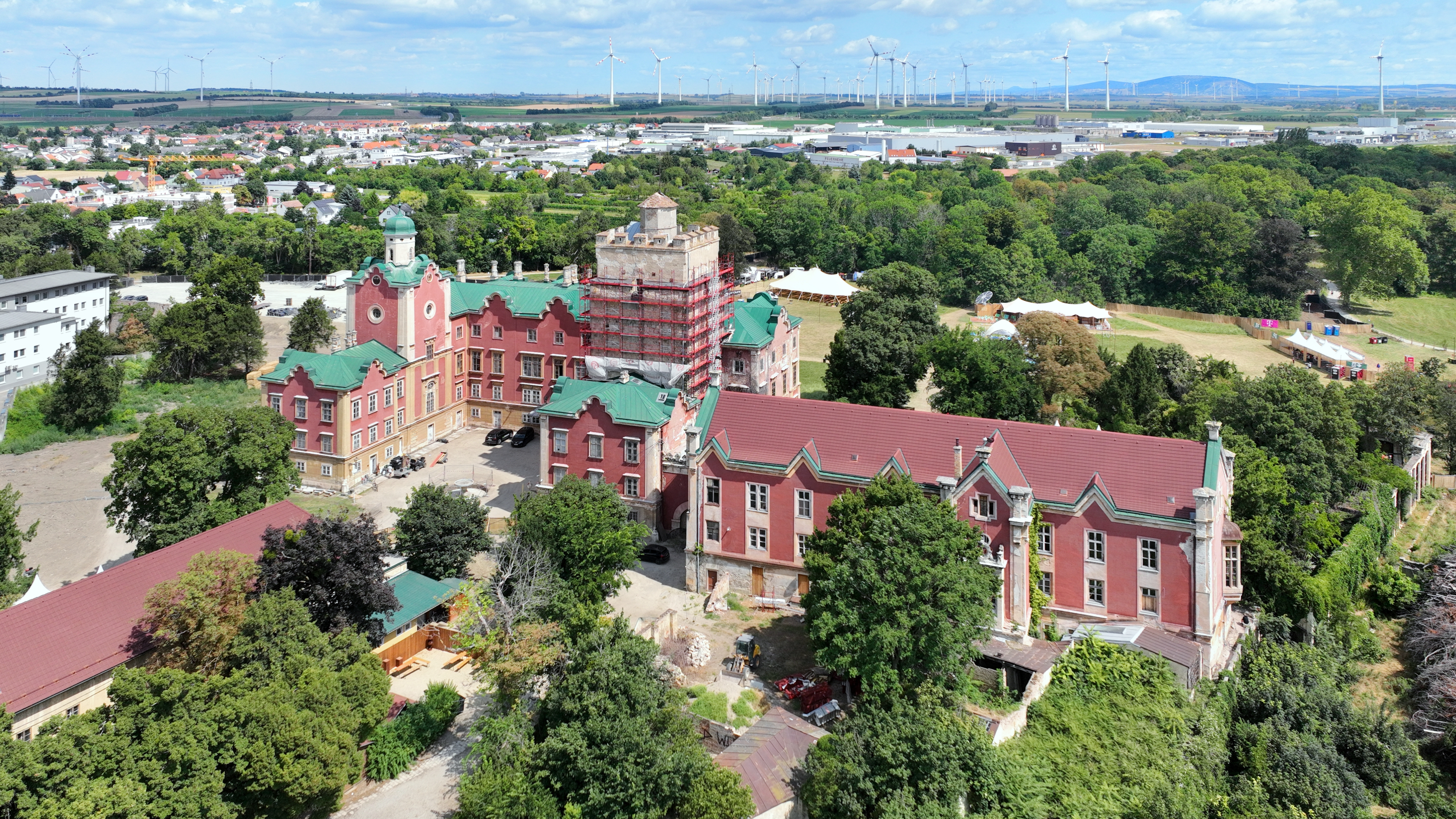
Reconstruction of Prugg Castle

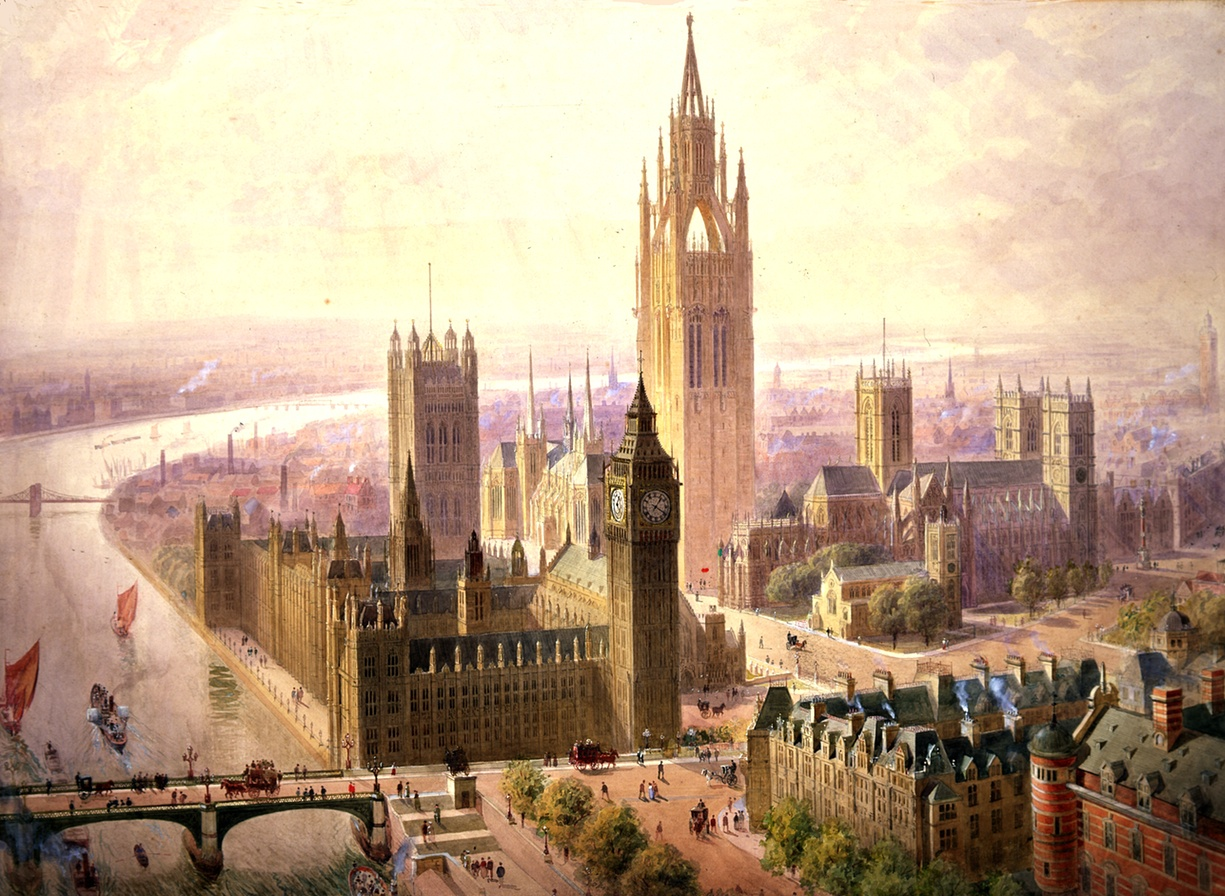
Lamb's son, Edward Beckitt Lamb, was also an architect. He and John Pollard Seddon created this 1904 design for a new Imperial Monumental Halls and Tower at Westminster was supposed to house the monuments alongside imperial trophies. The Gothic Revival tower would have been the tallest building in the UK with a similar floor area to the Abbey next door. Several different drawings from different angles were created.

== Publications ==
- Etchings of Gothic Ornament 1830
- Lamb, Edward Buckton (1846). Studies of Ancient Domestic Architecture. John Weale.
