= Wormelow Tump =

Village in Herefordshire, England

Coordinates: 51.969°N 2.741°W

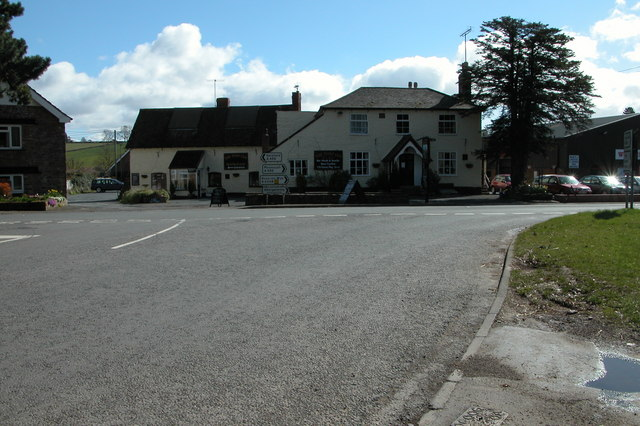
- The Tump Inn

- Location within Herefordshire
- OS grid reference: SO4910930347
- Civil parish: Much Birch; Much Dewchurch
- Unitary authority: Herefordshire
- Ceremonial county: Herefordshire
- Region: West Midlands
- Country: England
- Sovereign state: United Kingdom
- Post town: Bromyard
- Postcode district: HR2
- Police: West Mercia
- Fire: Hereford and Worcester
- Ambulance: West Midlands
- UK Parliament: Hereford and South Herefordshire

Wormelow Tump is a village in Herefordshire, England, 6 miles (10 km) south of Hereford and 6 1/2 mi (10 km) north-west of Ross-on-Wye. Most of the village lies in the parish of Much Birch, but it extends west across the parish boundary – which here follows the A466 – into Much Dewchurch parish.

The tump itself was a mound which local tradition holds was the burial place of King Arthur's son Amr. The tump was flattened to widen the road in 1896.

Wormelow gave its name to a hundred. The Domesday Book mentions the custom that all citizens of Herefordshire who owned a horse were required to attend the meeting of all the hundreds, which took place every three years at Wormelow Tump.

The village is the site of the Violette Szabo GC Museum, commemorating the life of World War II secret agent Violette Szabo. Szabo (nee Bushell) stayed occasionally in the village from childhood until just before her final mission, at a house then called The Old Kennels, which was the home of her cousins the Lucas family.

The local manor house, Bryngwyn Manor, has been converted into apartments.

== Map sources ==
- Map sources for Wormelow Tump
