= Much Dewchurch =

Village in Herefordshire, England

Coordinates: 51.976°N 2.755°W

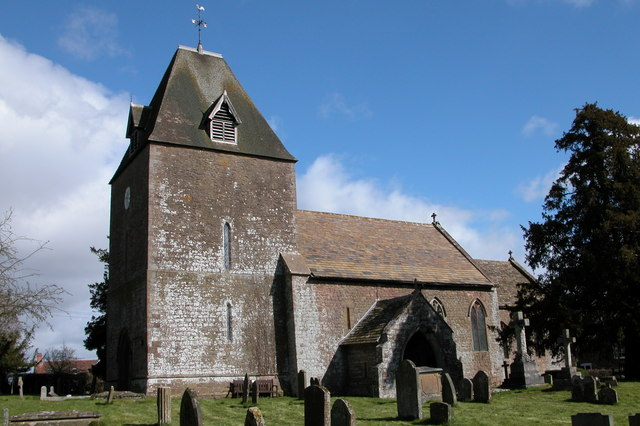
- St David's Church

- Location within Herefordshire
- Unitary authority: Herefordshire
- Shire county: Herefordshire
- Region: West Midlands
- Country: England
- Sovereign state: United Kingdom
- Post town: Hereford
- Postcode district: HR2
- Police: West Mercia
- Fire: Hereford and Worcester
- Ambulance: West Midlands
- UK Parliament: Hereford and South Herefordshire

Much Dewchurch is a village and civil parish in Herefordshire, England. The village lies about 6 miles (10 km) south of Hereford. The parish includes the hamlet of Kivernoll and part of the village of Wormelow.

The Old Vicarage has stood since the 17th century, and includes a plaque of the number of vicars that served the parish in 1665. Other buildings of note are the pub which still has Civil War musket damage on the wooden walls inside.

The Grade I listed Norman square-towered church, dedicated to St David, dates to the 12th century. A Victorian extension to the north transept was built in the high neo-gothic revival period. Inside is a memorial bas-relief to the Biddulph family, lords of the manor.

The Steiner Academy Hereford is at the centre of the village, close to and south of the church.

Large estates in the area include Bryngwyn Manor (grid reference SO484301) and The Mynde (SO470297), both lying south of the village. Bryngwyn Manor is a Victorian Gothic manor house constructed in 1868 by F. R. Kempson for Sir James Rankin, later MP for Leominster. The Mynde, a Grade I-listed building, was an ancestral home of the Pye family. Walter Pye was Attorney General in the reign of Charles I. The house was acquired by the Duke of Chandos, who sold the estate to the Symons family in 1729.

== See also ==
- Little Dewchurch
