= Kingsthorne =

Village in Herefordshire, England

Coordinates: 51.984°N 2.728°W

- Location within Herefordshire
- OS grid reference: SO500320
- Civil parish: Much Birch
- Unitary authority: Herefordshire
- Ceremonial county: Herefordshire
- Region: West Midlands
- Country: England
- Sovereign state: United Kingdom
- Post town: HEREFORD
- Postcode district: HR2 8
- Dialling code: 01981
- Police: West Mercia
- Fire: Hereford and Worcester
- Ambulance: West Midlands
- UK Parliament: Hereford and South Herefordshire

Kingsthorne, also known as King's Thorn, is a village in Herefordshire, England, in Much Birch parish between Hereford and Ross-on-Wye, adjacent to the A49 and A466 roads.

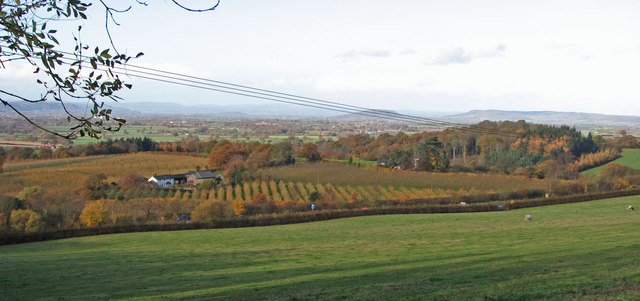
The rural area to the west of the village

The village lies 6 miles (9.7 km) south from Hereford and 22 miles (35 km) north west from Gloucester.

As the land use within the village is almost entirely residential, most services are located outside the village. The primary school catering for approximately 200 pupils is between Kingsthorne and Much Birch. The village is part of the Wormelow Hundred benefice, with its church in Little Birch. The Castle Inn is in the heart of the village.

== Notable people ==
- Ruth Sherlock, journalist
