= Steiner Academy Hereford =

Location
- Much Dewchurch; Hereford, Herefordshire, HR2 8DL; England; 51.9764°N 2.7565°W

Information
- Type: Academy
- Established: 2008; 18 years ago
- Local authority: Herefordshire
- Department for Education URN: 135672 Tables
- Ofsted: Reports
- Principal: Kate Andrews
- Gender: Coeducational
- Age: 3 to 16
- Website: www.steineracademyhereford.org.uk

The Steiner Academy Hereford is a Steiner-Waldorf Academy school in Much Dewchurch near Hereford, Herefordshire, UK. It opened in September 2008 based at the earlier Hereford Waldorf School and is the first publicly funded Steiner-Waldorf school in the UK. The school takes students from the Kindergarten age of 3 to 16.

== Natural Environment Academy ==
As a state-funded academy, its specialism is the natural environment. The academy is based on the earlier Hereford Waldorf School which existed for 25 years at the same site and comprised a Victorian school, medieval farmhouse and a more recent kindergarten extension, and eighteenth-century barns. Between 2008 and 2011 the school and site were redeveloped by John Renshaw Architects in a £6.5 million project using natural materials. This redevelopment provided a new hall, renewable energy, and buildings upgraded to reduce the environmental footprint, while organising the development of the site in sympathy with the natural environment. The school has outdoor classrooms and an area of productive gardens and other ecology areas dedicated to Landwork activities.

== Controversies ==
In December 2009 Steiner Academy Hereford was bottom of the primary school league tables for England derived from SATS scores at Key Stage 2. Parents had opposed the testing and many children were absent for the dates.

In contrast with assessment tests, in July 2013 Ofsted reported that 'Pupils are well prepared for more formal learning', 'Pupils achieve well throughout the school, reaching above the expected levels', they 'Go on to successfully study and achieve wide-ranging qualifications at GCE A level and beyond.', 'Older students develop strong independent working and thinking skills', 'Pupils’ artistic and practical achievements are impressive', 'Pupils have a strong sense of personal responsibility', and 'bullying is extremely rare'.

In September 2012, the school was accused by the British Humanist Association of including pseudoscience in its curriculum. Clarence Harvey, an acting principal of the Steiner Academy Hereford, responded: 'It is not our aim to promote scientific orthodoxy, but rather to enable pupils to think and engage in independent verification of reality.'

== See also ==
Curriculum of the Waldorf schools
