= Treago Castle =

Castle in St Weonards, Herefordshire, England

Coordinates: 51.9114°N 2.7425°W

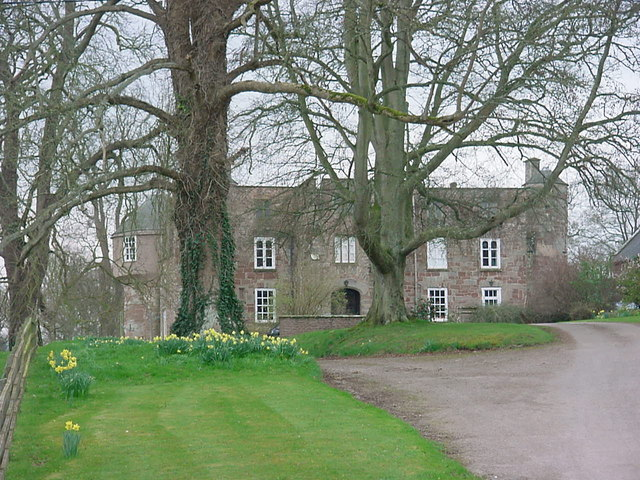
Treago Castle, seen from the gates

Treago Castle is a fortified manor house in the parish of St Weonards, Herefordshire, England (grid reference SO48922396). Built c. 1500, it was recorded as a Grade I listed building on 30 April 1986—based on its extant medieval architecture, quadrangle courtyard layout and defensive wall corner towers. The castle remains a private family residence. Digging on the site revealed solid bedrock.

== Main building ==
The building was probably built by Sir Richard Mynors (c. 1440–1528), a tax collector in Wales. The name originates from "Tre" (homestead or farm) and "Ago" (Iago being the Welsh form of the name "James"), suggesting there was a previous dwelling on the land. Another theory is that the name is derived from the hamlet of Treiago in Cornwall, because the heiress of John of Treiago, sheriff of Cornwall in the 1320s, married a Mynors in the reign of Edward IV. The fortified house was built to keep the Welsh out, but was never under attack.

Originally the building was of a secure design, featuring a central courtyard and no externally facing windows. Later, the courtyard area in the centre of the building was covered over in stages and new windows added to the outside walls, forming a more traditional house. Mason's marks matching those at Raglan Castle and traced to William Herbert, 1st Earl of Pembroke, were detected following a visit in 1975 by the Chief Inspector of Ancient Monuments, A. J. Taylor. There are similarities to Croft Castle, also in Herefordshire.

Whilst Treago Castle remains a private family home local charity events allow the public a limited opportunity to view inside the castle.

=== Estate and gardens ===
Surrounding the main buildings is parkland, probably landscaped during the late 18th century. There is no indication of a moat, although early plans of the estate do show a leat following the contour line across the estate, to the adjacent Furnace Farm. The parkland grounds became neglected for a period between the 1790s and 1840s. Four major improvements were constructed after c. 1840:

- Walled garden near the road, separated from the house by a shrubbery collection named The Wilderness.
- Walled kitchen garden furnished with well stocked fruit trees, on the site of the modern-day vineyard and to the south of the house.
- Tudor/Italianate styled garden containing gravel paths, grass, flower beds and clipped Irish yew trees. Referred to as Treago Garden on tithe maps from the period.
- A long driveway, forming a new principal entrance to the property approaching from the east.

Since 1991, the roses planted in the grounds have been primarily David C. H. Austin English roses.

=== Recent history ===
During the 1990s, the original stables area received renovation work, being converted into three connected cottages named Hollyhock, Coach House and Looseboxes that now see continual use as weekly holiday cottages. At the same time, a modern 11-metre indoor heated swimming pool was added and other renovations were carried out including of a grand piano.

Behind the cottages and main building are a joint garden and small quarry, traces of a Japanese garden and vineyard used for producing Treago branded award-winning red, white and sparkling wines.

A fountain was added in 1990, designed and made by Vanessa Marston, using ideas from the Mynors family crest. The Mynors' crest—a man's hand holding a bear's paw—is derived from the French sound a like main ours (English: bear hand). As of 2009 initiatives were underway to heat the castle in a more "green" way, using ground-source geothermal heat pump and compost-based biomass heating systems. The addition of a north porch has helped the process of making Treago an all-year-round family home.

== Mynors family association ==
The Mynors family has owned Treago since c. 1500. Sir Roger A. B. Mynors inhabited the estate in his last years. The house is still owned by the Baskerville Mynors family and currently inhabited by Sir Richard Mynors (b. 1947)—the present holder of the Mynors of Treago Baronetcy and vintner—and his wife Lady Fiona Mynors who works as an educational consultant. The couple have inhabited the main building since 1989, along with their three daughters: Alexandra, Frances and Victoria. As a result of the move, major restoration and modernisation work took place.

Although some family history can be traced back to the 11th century, the direct association between the Baskerville Mynors and the local area of St. Weonards is only recorded back to the mid-15th century, around the time of the construction of the present building.

== Other uses of the name ==
In 1932, the Great Western Railway named steam engine No. 5019 Treago Castle. The Castle Class locomotive continued to carry this name for 30 years, before finally being withdrawn in 1962.
