= Little Dewchurch =

Village in Herefordshire, England

Coordinates: 51.9827°N 2.6825°W

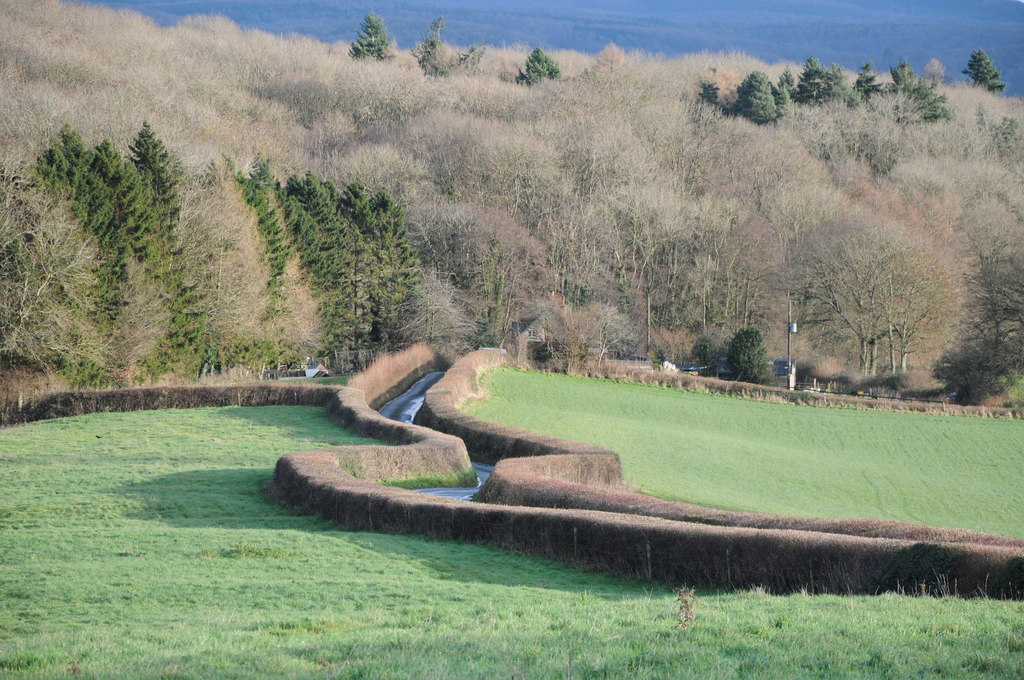
Winding country road, Little Dewchurch

Little Dewchurch is a village and civil parish in Herefordshire, England. The population of the village was 402 as taken at the 2011 census.

== Etymology of name ==
The village takes its name from the parish church of Saint David's which in Welsh is Dewi Sant.

== See also ==
- Much Dewchurch
