= St Weonards =

Village in Herefordshire, England

Coordinates: 51.914795°N 2.735156°W

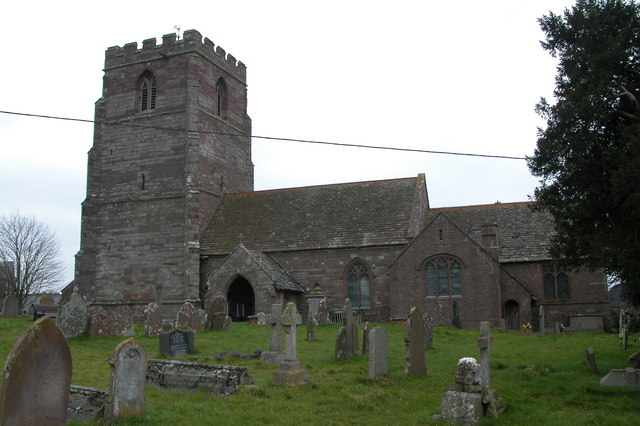
- St Weonard's Church

- Location within Herefordshire
- Population: 383 (2011)
- OS grid reference: SO496243
- Unitary authority: Herefordshire
- Region: West Midlands
- Country: England
- Sovereign state: United Kingdom
- Post town: HEREFORD
- Postcode district: HR2
- Dialling code: 01981
- Police: West Mercia
- Fire: Hereford and Worcester
- Ambulance: West Midlands
- UK Parliament: Hereford and South Herefordshire

St Weonards (/ˈwɒnərdz/) is a village and civil parish in south Herefordshire, England, located approximately 8 miles west of Ross-on-Wye, approximately 10 miles south of the county town, Hereford, and approximately 8 miles north of Monmouth, on the A466 road. Within the parish and also on the A466 is the hamlet of Sandyway.

== St Weonards Church ==
St Weonard's Church is dedicated to St Weonard, who may have been a local Celtic saint. Old stained glass in the church, now destroyed, described him as a hermit and showed him with a woodcutter's axe. His name is spelled in various ways, including Wannard and Gwennarth.

The church was first mentioned in a charter of 1155. The chancel arch, part of the south wall, and the inner doorway of the porch, date from the 13th and 14th centuries, as does a large wooden chest. Most of the current church building dates from the early 16th century, when it was enlarged by the building of the north aisle, south porch and tower. The internal oak screens date from the same period, as does the Mynors Chapel, built for the family who owned, and still own, Treago Castle. The pulpit dates from the 17th century. The chancel was enlarged in 1884, and the south vestry added. The churchyard contains the remains of a 15th-century cross base.

== St Weonards Tump ==
Immediately south of the churchyard is a large mound or "tump", some 45 yards (41 m) in diameter at the base and 14 feet (4.3 m) high. This was traditionally the burial place of St Weonard, in a golden coffin. Excavations in 1855 revealed two cremation burials dating from the Bronze Age within the mound. The tump seems to have been used by the Normans as a motte for a small wooden castle, and in later centuries was used as the site of morris dancing and other village festivities.

== Treago Castle ==
Treago Castle, some 0.3 miles (0.48 km) west of the village, is a mediaeval fortified manor house and Grade I listed building. It is believed to have been built around 1480 by Sir Richard Mynors, who was Sheriff of Herefordshire in 1500, on land which had been owned by his family at least since the 14th century. The castle is set within parkland, and is still privately owned by the Mynors family.
