= Hentland =

Village in Herefordshire, England

Coordinates: 51.935°N 2.665°W

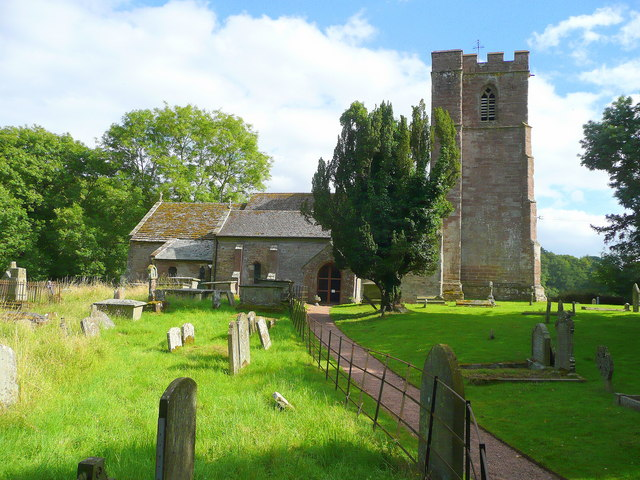
- St Dubricius' Church, Hentland

- Location within Herefordshire
- Population: 436 (2011 Census)
- OS grid reference: SO542265
- Civil parish: Hentland
- Unitary authority: Herefordshire
- Ceremonial county: Herefordshire
- Region: West Midlands
- Country: England
- Sovereign state: United Kingdom
- Post town: Ross-on-Wye
- Postcode district: HR9
- Post town: Hereford
- Postcode district: HR2
- Dialling code: 01989; 01432
- Police: West Mercia
- Fire: Hereford and Worcester
- Ambulance: West Midlands
- UK Parliament: Hereford and South Herefordshire

Hentland is a hamlet and civil parish about 5 miles (8 km) north-west of Ross-on-Wye in Herefordshire, England.

The small hamlet settlement of Hentland at the east of the parish contains the parish church of St Dubricius. The civil parish, bounded on its eastern side by the River Wye, also includes the villages of Hoarwithy and St Owen's Cross, and the hamlets of Gillow, Kynaston, Little Pengethley, Llanfrother and Red Rail. The area is mostly farmland, with a small proportion being woodland. The soil consists of red loam, with a subsoil of rock and clay.

The name 'Hentland' derives from the Old Welsh Hên-llan, meaning "old church-enclosure".

Hentland is the site of an early Welsh monastery, built by Saint Dubricius in the 6th century, which probably stood in the field just south of the present parish church, and is a place for Saint Dubricius' pilgrimage.

Gillow Manor is a 14th-century manor house with part of its moat still surviving; in the Middle Ages it was one of the homes of the Pembridge family of Herefordshire.

Hall Court Farm is a Grade II listed half timbered house at Kynaston dating from the early 1600s.
