= Much Birch =

Village in Herefordshire, England

Coordinates: 51°58′N 2°43′W

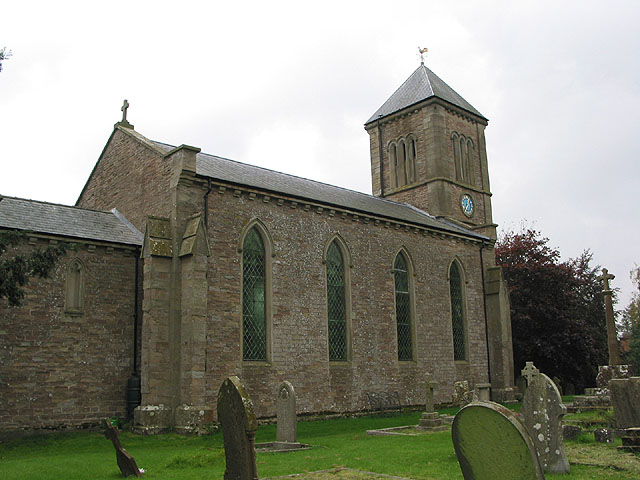
- Parish Church of St Mary and St Thomas Becket

- Location within Herefordshire
- Unitary authority: Herefordshire
- Shire county: Herefordshire
- Region: West Midlands
- Country: England
- Sovereign state: United Kingdom
- Post town: Hereford
- Postcode district: HR2
- Police: West Mercia
- Fire: Hereford and Worcester
- Ambulance: West Midlands
- UK Parliament: Hereford and South Herefordshire

Much Birch is a village and civil parish in Herefordshire, England, between Hereford and Ross-on-Wye. The village had a population of 911 as of the 2011 census.

The village extends for about 1.5 miles (2 km) along the A49, a busy trunk road running from the border with South Wales to North West England. Nearby are the settlements Kings Thorn, Much Birch, and Wormelow. Also nearby is the Wye Valley.

The church of St Mary and St Thomas of Canterbury, designed by Thomas Foster, dates from 1837. The chancel ceiling is painted with cherubs peeping over clouds. The Poor Clares order of nuns has a convent in Much Birch.
