= John Pollard Seddon =

English architect

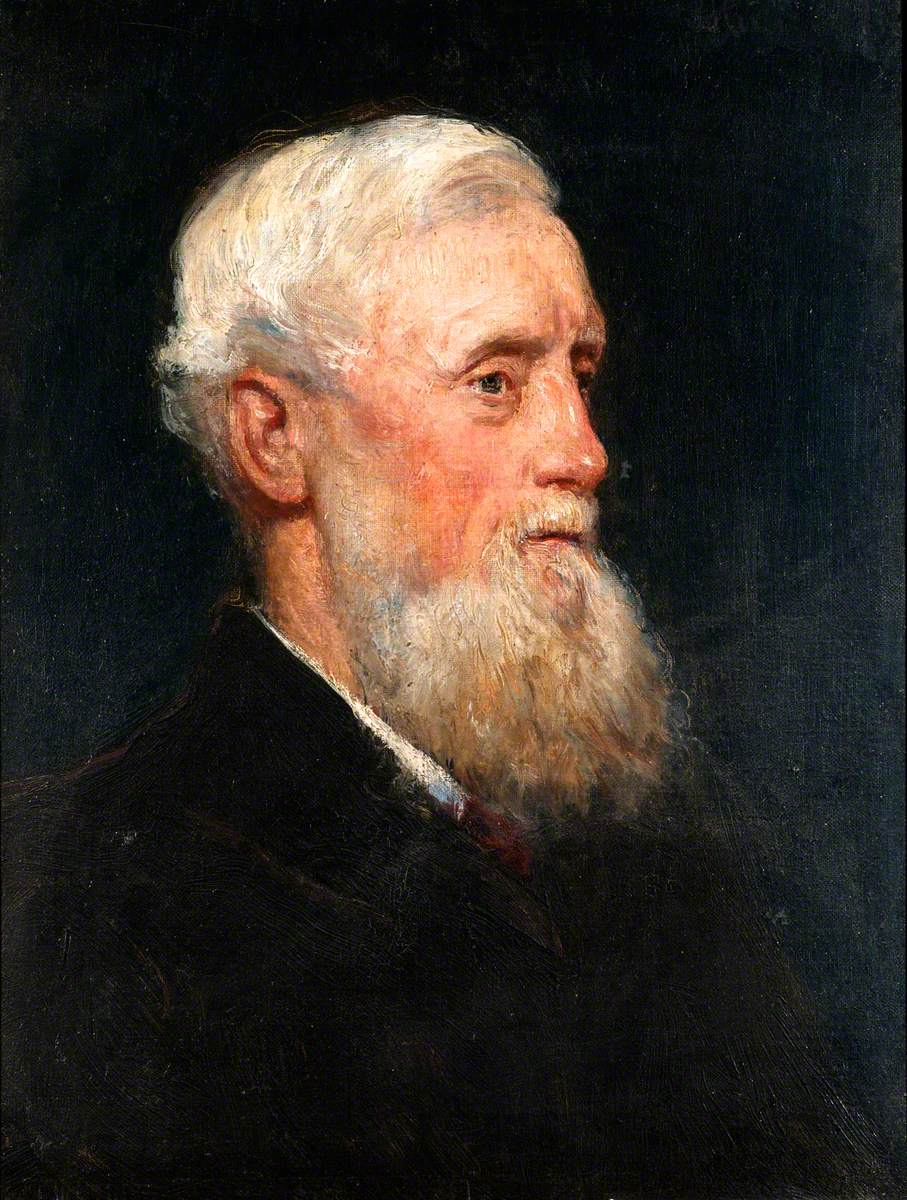
Portrait of John Pollard Seddon (c. 1890–1905) by Hans Heyerdahl

John Pollard Seddon FRIBA (19 September 1827 – 1 February 1906) was a British architect, working largely on churches.

== Life ==
His father was a cabinetmaker, and his brother, Thomas Seddon (1821–1856), was a landscape painter. Born in London, he was educated at Bedford School. He was later a pupil of Thomas Leverton Donaldson, though Donaldson was a classical architect and Seddon preferred the Gothic Revivalism of John Ruskin.

Between 1852 and 1863, Seddon formed a partnership with John Prichard. Many of their major commissions were church restoration works, most famously for Llandaff Cathedral. In 1871 he submitted a design in a competition for Holloway Sanatorium.

C. F. A. Voysey was articled as a pupil of Seddon in 1873. From 1884 to 1904 he was in partnership with John Coates Carter.

== Works ==
In 1904 Seddon was Diocesan Architect for London and designed a gigantic Imperial Monumental Halls, with a tall tower, to be added to Westminster Abbey; it was intended to restore the dominance of the abbey over the surrounding crowd of towers and monuments. However, the cost of construction was prohibitive and it remained unbuilt.

Seddon designed a number of properties in Birchington-on-Sea, Kent, including Westcliff Bungalow, which was the final residence of Pre-Raphaelite poet and artist Dante Gabriel Rossetti. In 1892, Rossetti died there and the dwelling later became known as the Rossetti Bungalow. Despite protests by residents, in 1966 Margate Borough Council approved plans for it to be demolished and the site was re-developed.

His other works include the University College of Wales building (the Old College) in Aberystwyth; St Peter's Church, Ayot St Peter, Hertfordshire; St Nicholas Church, Great Yarmouth; St Catherine's Church, Hoarwithy, Herefordshire; and, with Prichard, the Church of St John, Llandenny; the 1858–9 rebuild of St Mary's Church, Aberavon, and limited extensions to Dingestow Court, Monmouthshire, including the stables. He also designed All Saints' Church in Chigwell Row, Essex, built between 1865 and 1867; it was listed as Grade II in 2024. He was also a prolific designer of furniture, metalwork, stained glass, tiles and ceramics.

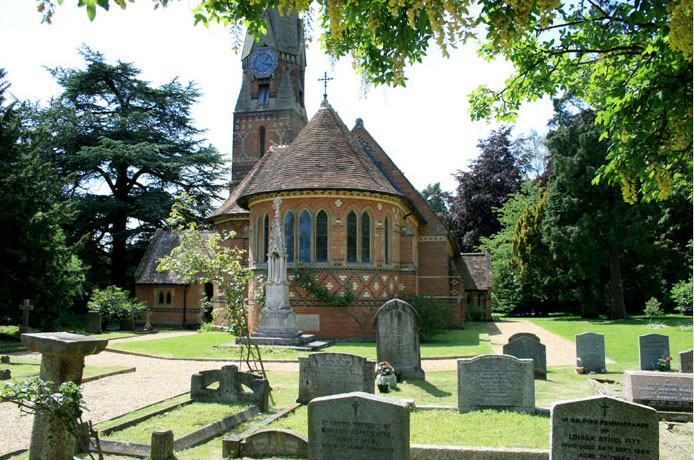
Church at Ayot St Peter

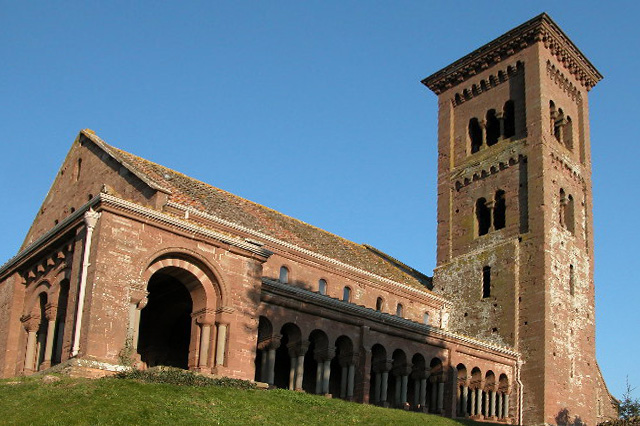
St Catherine's Church, Hoarwithy

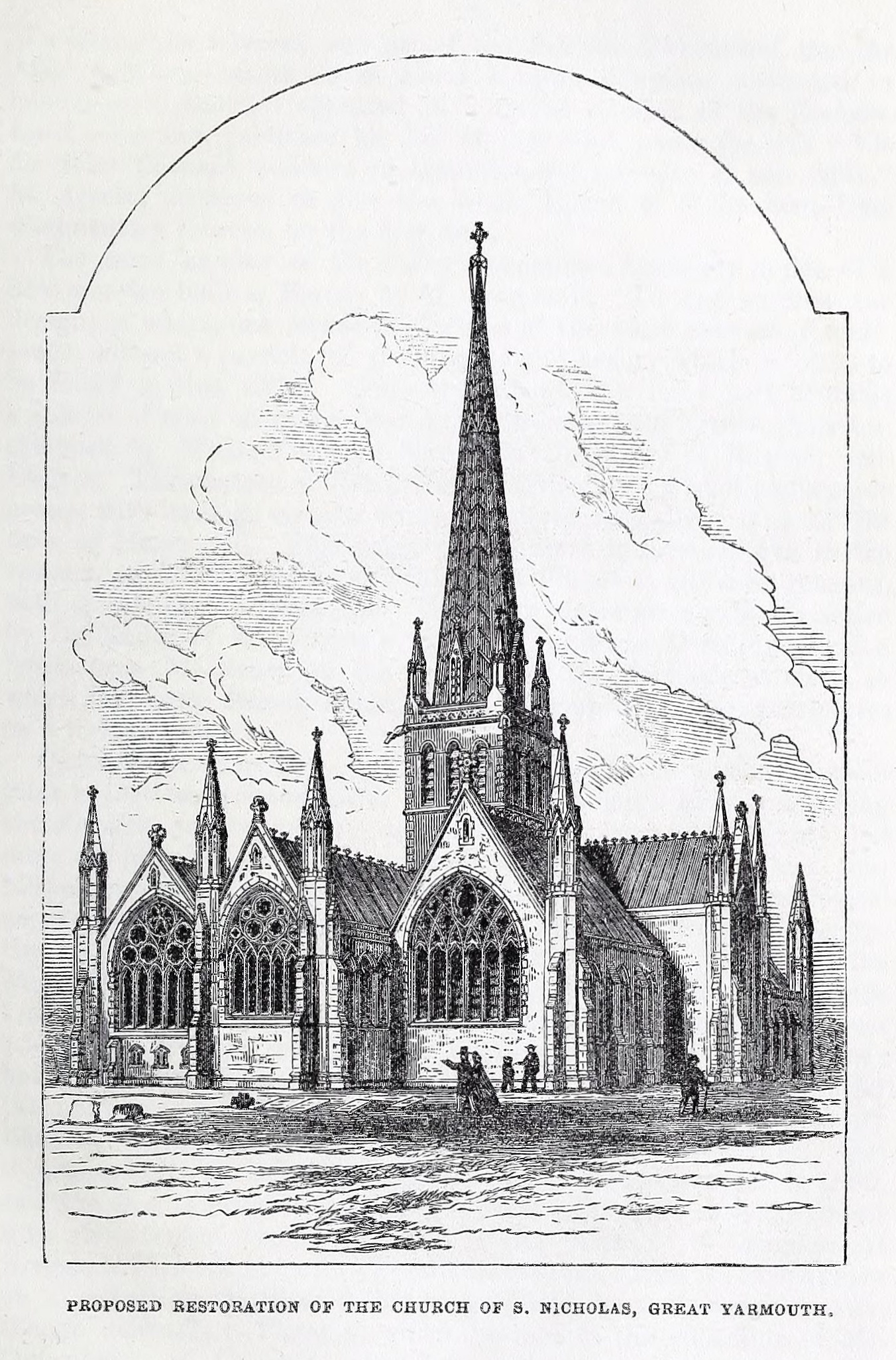
St Nicholas Church, Great Yarmouth
