= List of crossings of the River Wye =

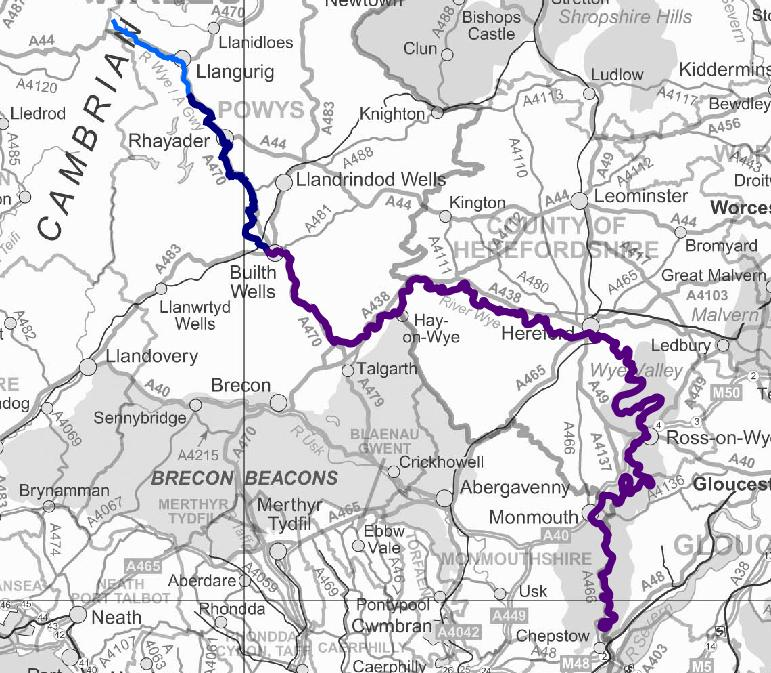
River Wye

Crossings of the River Wye in the UK cover the whole length of the 215 kilometres (134 mi) from its source at Plynlimon to the River Severn. For much of its length the river forms part of the border between England and Wales. The lower Wye Valley is a National Landscape (formerly Area of Outstanding Natural Beauty). There are some 15 Grade II listed bridges, one Grade II* listed bridge and three Grade I listed bridges.

== Crossings ==
Key to heritage status
Status	Criteria
I	Grade I listed. Bridge of exceptional interest, sometimes considered to be internationally important
II*	Grade II* listed. Particularly important bridge of more than special interest
II	Grade II listed. Bridge of national importance and special interest

In order, moving downstream:

Crossing	Coordinates	Built	Heritage status	Locality	Notes	Refs	Image
Source of the River Wye			-	Plynlimon	Included for completeness		
Y Drum Bridge	grid reference SN 854 828	1965		Pont Rhydgaled	The first bridge over the Wye, 3.2 kilometres (2.0 mi) below its source. A steel beam structure with a wooden deck, 10 metres (33 ft) long with two cylindrical columns mid-span.		
Pont Cefn-Brwyn	grid reference SN 830 836	about 1910		Pont Rhygaled	Built to serve the Nanty Lead Mine. The bridge was strengthened in 1975 to allow road vehicles from the Institute of Hydrology to reach a weir upstream of the bridge.		
Pont Rhydgaled		1800		Pont Rhydgaled	Carries the A44 road over river just above its confluence with the Afon Tarenig.		
Nanty	grid reference SN 854 820	1992			A three-span wooden footbridge built to replace an earlier structure. The Nanty Lead Mine was located here, but closed in 1867.		
Footbridge		1992		The Wye Valley Walk footbridge			
Waun Capel Parc footbridge	grid reference SN 968 681	1965	-	Rhayader	A single-span made of three continuous truss girders of welded steel, built by the Royal Monmouthshire Royal Engineers.		
Rhayader road bridge				Rhayader. Carries the B4518 road.			
Glyn Bridge				Llanwrthwl			
Llanwrthwl Bridge				Llanwrthwl			
Yr Allt Farm bridge				Farm access			
Newbridge-on-Wye Bridge				Newbridge-on-Wye			
Brynwern Bridge				Llanyre			
Builth Road Railway Bridge				Near Builth Road railway station	Located on the Heart of Wales Line.		
Wye Bridge, Builth Wells			II	Builth Wells			
Erwood Bridge				Erwood	Carries the B4594 road		
Lady Milford's Bridge			-	Llanstephan			
Boughrood Bridge			II	Boughrood			
Glasbury Bridge				Glasbury			
Hay Bridge				Hay-on-Wye railway station	Crossed over the river from Radnorshire to Brecknockshire as well as the currently closed Hereford, Hay and Brecon Railway. It is near the former Hay-on-Wye station which is on the southern side in Herefordshire.		
Whitney-on-Wye Railway Bridge				Whitney-on-Wye	Demolished on the former Hereford, Hay and Brecon Railway which is closed.		
Whitney-on-Wye toll bridge			II	Whitney-on-Wye			
Bredwardine Bridge			II	Bredwardine			
Bridge Sollers Bridge				Bridge Sollers			
Hunderton Bridge			-	Hereford	On the former Goods Line, part of the original Newport, Abergavenny and Hereford Railway		
Greyfriars bridge (A49 road)		1967					
Wye Bridge, Hereford			I	Hereford	Late 15th century, widened 1826.		
Victoria Bridge			II	Hereford	Footbridge over River Wye, c. 1897, built by Findlay of Motherwell, concrete piers		
Greenway Bridge			-	Rotherwas, Hereford	Bridge links the Bartonsham and Rotherwas areas of Hereford.		
Eign Bridge			-	Rotherwas, Hereford	Built as part of the Hereford, Ross and Gloucester Railway which line is largely closed apart from the section here which is part of the Welsh Marches Line.		
Holme Lacy Bridge			-	Holme Lacy			
Ballingham Railway Bridge	grid reference SO 569 306	1855–1859		Ballingham	Carried the closed Hereford, Ross and Gloucester Railway over the river, the bridge decking is demolished.		
Hoarwithy Bridge			-	Hoarwithy			
Sellack Suspension Bridge			II	Sellack			
Foy Bridge			-	Foy			
Strangford Railway Bridge			-		Closed Hereford, Ross and Gloucester Railway line. Decking spanning the river demolished.		
Backney Railway Bridge			-	Backney Halt railway station	Closed Hereford, Ross and Gloucester Railway line.		
Bridstow Bridge			-	Bridstow	Bridstow bridge, completed in 1960, carries the A40 trunk road over the river Wye near Ross-on-Wye.		
Wilton Bridge			I	Wilton	Stone bridge. In 1597 an Act was passed authorising its construction. It was completed within the next 2 years. 5 semicircular arches each with 3 ribs.		
Kerne Bridge			II	Kerne Bridge	Road bridge. 1828 by B D Jones. Ashlar. Five-span bridge with large central arch flanked by graded arches.		
Welsh Bicknor Railway Bridge			-	Welsh Bicknor	On the closed Ross and Monmouth Railway.		
Huntsham Bridge			II				
Hand ferry at the Ye Old Ferrie Inn			-		Symonds Yat		
Hand ferry at the Saracens Head Inn			-		Symonds Yat		
Biblins Bridge			-		Site of Biblins Youth Campsite		
Wye Bridge (Monmouth)			II	Monmouth	Built in 1617		
Duke of Beaufort Bridge			II	Monmouth Troy	Built in 1874. It is listed (as a historic structure) simply as the Railway Bridge, Monmouth.		
Monmouth Viaduct	51.804475°N 2.707872°W		-	Monmouth Troy	Bridge dismantled in 1967. It carried the Coleford, Monmouth, Usk & Pontypool Railway line. Part of the closed Wye Valley Railway line.		
Penallt Viaduct			II	Penallt – Redbrook	Also known as, and listed as Redbrook Railway Bridge. Previously carried the Wye Valley Railway. Still in use as a footpath.		
Bigsweir Bridge			II*	Bigsweir	Carries the A466 road.		
Brockweir Bridge	51.707029°N 2.668972°W	1906	II	Brockweir	Designed by S. W. & A. L. Yockney of Victoria Street, Westminster. The contractors were E. Finch and Company of Chepstow.		
Tintern Railway Bridge	51.700334°N 2.673260°W			Tintern station	Demolished. On the closed Wye Valley Railway south of Tintern railway station.		
Old Tramway Bridge	51.699424°N 2.681343°W	1875	II	Tintern	Listed as the Old Tramway Bridge (formerly Wireworks Bridge), but also known as the Tintern Footbridge. Previously carried the Tintern Wireworks Branch, now a footbridge.		
Old Wye Bridge, Chepstow	52.48855°N 3.72676°W		I	Chepstow	Carries the B4228 road.		
A48 bridge	52.48681°N 3.72227°W		-	Chepstow	Carries the A48 road.		
Chepstow Railway Bridge	52.48151°N 3.71618°W		II	Chepstow	Built in 1852 as part of the South Wales Railway. It also brought the Wye Valley Railway (now closed) into Chepstow station. It now carries the Gloucester to Newport Line.		
M48 Wye Bridge	52.47276°N 3.70141°W		II	Tidenham and Chepstow	Built in 1966, it carried the M4 motorway between England and Wales until the opening of the Second Severn Crossing in 1996. It now carries the M48 motorway.		
Severn-Wye Cable Tunnel	51.61098°N 2.66921°W		-	Mathern (Newhouse) – Aust	The tunnel is 47 metres (154 ft) deep, with a diameter of 3.05 metres (10.0 ft) and a total length of 3,678 metres (4,022 yd). The tunnel carries two 400 kV circuits, each with three cables.		
Aust Severn Powerline Crossing	51.60578°N 2.64136°W		-		Longest powerline span in the UK at 1 mile (1,618 metres).		

== See also ==
- List of bridges in Wales
- Wye Valley
- Wye Valley Walk
- List of crossings of the River Severn
