= Lea, Herefordshire =

Coordinates: 51.8931°N 2.4989°W

Lea
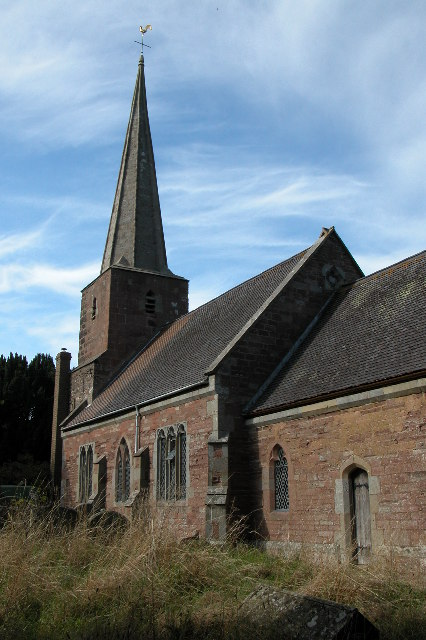
- Church of St John the Baptist, Lea

- Location within Herefordshire
- Population: 673 (2011)
- OS grid reference: SO655214
- Shire county: Herefordshire
- Region: West Midlands
- Country: England
- Sovereign state: United Kingdom
- Post town: Ross-on-Wye
- Postcode district: HR9
- Dialling code: 01989
- Police: West Mercia
- Fire: Hereford and Worcester
- Ambulance: West Midlands
- UK Parliament: Hereford and South Herefordshire

Lea (or The Lea) is a village and civil parish in the south east of Herefordshire. It lies south-east of Ross-on-Wye and adjoins the boundary of Gloucestershire. Amenities include a school, church, village hall, shop, public house, garage and a twice-weekly mobile Post Office, all of which lie on the A40 road which passes through the village and links Ross and Gloucester.

The Church of St John the Baptist is a Grade II* listed building. The church consists of tower, with spire, three bells, nave, chancel and north aisle. The north aisle is terminated by a chapel, probably erected by the Grey family of Wilton, whose arms are placed there. The church was restored in 1854, and fitted with open seats. The marble baptismal font, of c. 1200, is south Italian, given to the church in 1909 in memory of Sarah Decima Bradney (died 1907). The knotted shaft stands on an elephant and the bowl has a band of Cosmati work. The Church of England parish is in the united Ariconium benefice of six parishes: Aston Ingham, Hope Mansell, Lea, Linton, Upton Bishop and Weston under Penyard.

In 2014, police raided the Crown Inn to look for the "Holy Grail" which was reported stolen from nearby Weston under Penyard. The only item found that vaguely resembled the Nanteos Cup was a wooden salad bowl.

The railway engineering company Alan Keef Ltd has its headquarters on the outskirts of the village.

Between 1855 and 1964, Lea was served by Mitcheldean Road railway station on the Hereford, Ross and Gloucester Railway.

== Lea parish ==
The township of Lea Lower (or Lea Gloucester), containing the parish church of Lea, was an exclave of Gloucestershire until it was transferred to Herefordshire under the Counties (Detached Parts) Act 1844. The parish had three townships, the others being Lea Upper and Lea Bailey. The townships were made into civil parishes but the Lea Upper and Lea Lower parishes were united in 1883. Lea Bailey parish was abolished in 1890 and divided between the parishes of Lea and Blaisdon in Gloucestershire.

== See also ==
- Lea Bailey Light Railway
