= Ariconium =

Ancient place in Roman Britain

- Herefordshire, England, UK
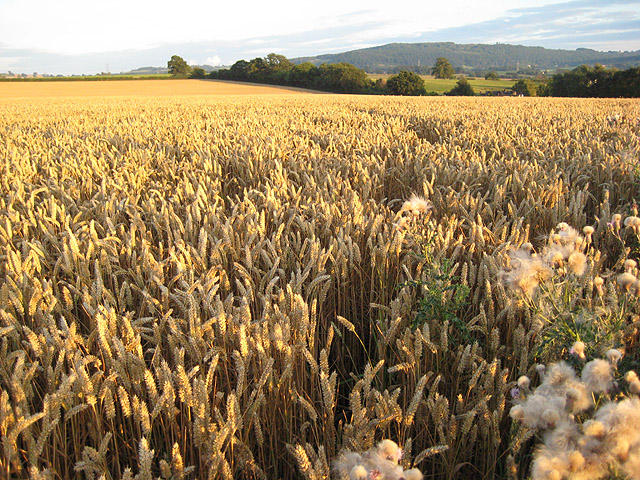
- Bury Hill, approximate site of Ariconium

Location
- Location in Herefordshire
- Coordinates: 51.91°N 2.52°W
- Grid reference: SO6423

Ariconium was a road station of Roman Britain mentioned in Iter XIII of the Iter Britanniarum of the Antonine Itineraries. It was located at Bury Hill in the parish of Weston under Penyard, about 3 miles (5 km) east of Ross on Wye, Herefordshire, and about 15 miles (24 km) southeast of Hereford. The site existed prior to the Roman era, and then came under Roman control. It was abandoned, perhaps shortly after 360, but precisely when and under what circumstances is unknown.

Discovered as a result of efforts to map the stations of the Antonine Itineraries, research and excavation have provided the only information on its history, to date showing it to have been a place of bloom furnaces, forges, and iron working throughout its existence.

== Context ==
The Forest of Dean and nearby areas were an ancient source of iron ore and charcoal. There is evidence of early mining and smelting, and there were many sites consisting of groups of forges. The site of Ariconium was on the rise of a hill, where airflow is increased due to the terrain. This favoured the establishment of bloomeries, an ancient process that produced imperfect iron, together with cinders, dirt, and unreduced oxide. A Roman contribution was the use of bellows, causing an air blast that was hotter and produced better but unforgeable iron, requiring a further refining by reheating, and using a great deal of charcoal. The cinder refuse or scoriae was dumped in great piles at such sites.

== Discovery of the site ==
In the early years of serious research into the locations of stations on the Antonine Itineraries, the location of Ariconium was in doubt, and William Camden (1551–1623) suggested Magnis, the site of modern Kenchester, some 7 miles (11 km) northwest of modern Hereford. Later analysis of the Antonine Itineraries, notably by John Horsley (1685–1732), refined previous estimates and ultimately placed Ariconium at Bury Hill, Weston under Penyard, 17 miles (27 km) west-northwest of Glevum (at modern Gloucester), and 13 miles (21 km) northeast of Blestium (at modern Monmouth). With confidence that the overgrown ruins near Weston under Penyard were actually the site of Ariconium, local people began clearing away the brush, revealing the enormous magnitude of the cinder piles, and further revealing the walls of buildings. Stories emerged of significant Roman-era relics, and there were unverified stories that existing relics having no provenance had actually been found in Ariconium.

Such capable modern research as has been done so far supports the characterisation of a large iron working site with massive refuse piles covering approximately 100 acres (40 ha), pottery remnants, and numerous artefacts. Finds have included pre-Roman British coins, including one minted by Cunobelin, and coins from the Roman arrival until 360, after which there are no coins found.

== History ==
The site was occupied by the pre-Roman Britons, likely as part of an iron working industry. It was continually occupied throughout the Roman era, and the scale of industrial activity increased over the period. It is clear that there was a focus of settlement activity near Bromsash, but the area appears to some archaeologists to have contained dispersed centres of activity and settlement rather than a Roman town. Ariconium's only documented significance is as a station on Iter XIII of the Iter Britanniarum, with the single mention there being its only mention in classical history.

It seems to have been abandoned shortly after 360. Its sudden abandonment is consistent with a violent end, and may be related to the collapse of authority and widespread marauding at that time, as reported by Ammianus, a situation that lasted for almost a decade, and from which parts of Roman Britain never recovered. Evidence of later occupation of the site has not been found.

== The name ==
The origin of the name Ariconium is uncertain, as is its pre-Roman name. The Romans often named a place in recognition of some feature of the terrain, or in recognition of the people then living in the area. There is a similarity to other Roman place-names such as Viroconium (post-Roman Welsh: Caer Guricon), also known as Uriconium, but as yet no established connection to them.

It is generally believed that Ariconium is the origin of the name of the post-Roman kingdom of Ergyng, although Ariconium was located outside the later boundaries of Ergyng. It is plausible that both derive from an earlier name for a wider area. In turn, Ergyng is believed to have given its name to Archenfield.

Since 2008, it has been used as the name of a united benefice of six Church of England parishes in the area - Aston Ingham, Hope Mansell, Lea, Linton, Upton Bishop and Weston under Penyard.

== In literature ==
As with many other places in Britain, there have been speculative articles written that connect Ariconium to the characters in Arthurian tales. Some are careful with their wording and state that they are not asserting historical facts; others are less careful and propagate fiction in the guise of hypothesis.

There are occasional mentions of Ariconium in poetic works, but there is nothing to connect them with the Ariconium of this article. They may be references to Kenchester at a time when Camden placed the site there, or to a similar-sounding word such as Uriconium, or to some other place or person; or as works of poetry, they may refer to nothing in particular at all.
