= Longhope =

Coordinates: 51°52′04″N 2°27′10″W

- Village
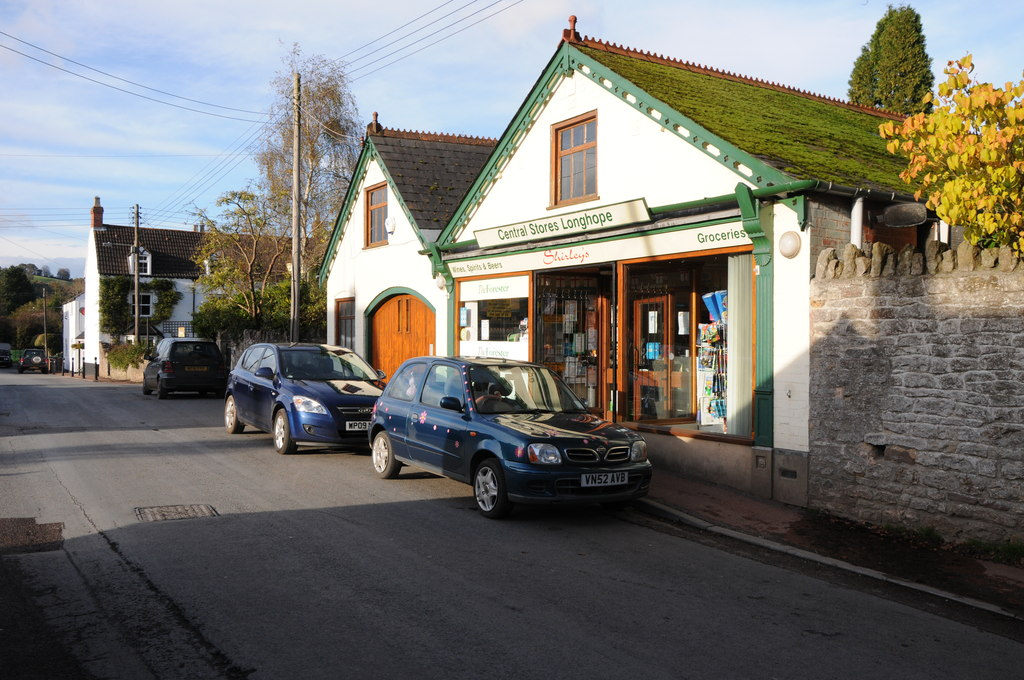

- Location within Gloucestershire
- Population: 1,489 (2011)
- OS grid reference: SO689189
- District: Forest of Dean
- Shire county: Gloucestershire
- Region: South West
- Country: England
- Sovereign state: United Kingdom
- Post town: Longhope
- Postcode district: GL17
- Police: Gloucestershire
- Fire: Gloucestershire
- Ambulance: South Western
- UK Parliament: Forest of Dean

Longhope is a village in west Gloucestershire, situated within the Forest of Dean, England, United Kingdom. Arthur Bullock, who was born in Longhope in 1899, described its location as follows: The parish occupies the most easterly valley in the group of hills which lie between the Severn and the Wye. The name means long valley. It is about four miles long, running roughly north to south, and it is separated from the Severn valley by a range of hills consisting of May Hill (937 ft), Huntley Hill, Blaisdon Hill and Notwood Hill.'

The village falls in the Blaisdon and Longhope electoral ward. This ward has Longhope in the north and Blaisdon as its smaller southerly neighbour. The total ward population taken at the 2011 census was 1,754.

May Hill is a prominent landmark and the ownership of the summit is vested with Longhope Parish Council.

Little London is part of the Parish of Longhope and is found to the north of the village leading to the neighbouring village of Huntley.

== History ==
The village was inhabited by the 11th century and the manor of Hope is mentioned in the Domesday Book. The village parish church, dedicated to All Saints, dates back to Norman times. The arms of William III hang above the door and lower parts of the four-stage west tower are late Norman, as is one window. There exists also, in the north transept, an effigy of a priest which is dated to circa 1300. The porch and several windows are early 14th century. The church was extensively restored during the 1860s when the north vestries were added and the tower was partially rebuilt.

Opposite the church, Court Leet was once the local court with the adjacent half-timbered cottage being the gaol. Another house of historic interest is Royal Spring, where Charles I is said to have stopped for refreshment in 1642 after the Battle of Powick Bridge during the English Civil War.

Longhope station opened in 1855 with the line it was located on, being the Hereford, Ross and Gloucester Railway (part of the Great Western Railway) linking Ross-on-Wye and Grange Court and thence to Gloucester. Longhope station was used in season to export locally produced jam and fruit grown locally. The station had a passing loop on what was a single track. The station has been demolished but the waiting room still remains.

A cameo description of life in Longhope before World War I is given in a memoir by Arthur Bullock. He fondly recalled, "I could hardly have chosen a better village to be born in than Longhope". Among the reasons he gave were that the houses were "sufficiently concentrated to give a sense of community and sufficiently scattered to give the citizens a sense of individuality". He alluded to the frequent services run by the Great Western Railway, but noted, "for shopping it was really not necessary to go outside the village as there were two good general stores with three small shops, two bakers, a post office, coal merchant, blacksmith and four public houses. He also records that later "Mrs Wright opened another general shop and news agency, and Mr C. Powell built a village hall which he called the Latchen Room. There was a cricket team, football team, tennis club and choral society."

Bullock's memoir provides a detailed account of life in Longhope at that time, including the role of James Constance and Sons as the chief employers in the village (whose workers included Bullock's father George and brother Wallace) and the profusion of other trades that were in operation, including hurdle making and wheelwrighting, and also records that the greatest fruit crop grown there were plums. The Bullocks were a characterful family, very active in village life. Other local families included the Carpenters, the Lanes, and the Halls, who were cartwrights. The village also had more than its fair share of eccentrics, including the churchwarden and builder, Feyther Field, who apparently would ride along on a bicycle carrying a ladder.

Bullock notes that there was a council school next to the Zion Baptist Chapel at the top of Hopes Hill, but he and his siblings went to Longhope Church School across the road from the church. Arthur described it as "one big room with a fire grate at one end"; toilet facilities were primitive and there were "no washing facilities but a tin bowl and a chunk of red carbolic soap". The schoolroom was bitterly cold, he recalled: there were times in winter that his feet were so cold that he could not feel them his hands so cold that he could only write with difficulty. However, he was full of admiration for the quality of education the pupils received from the schoolmaster and schoolmistress, Mr and Mrs Hill. The current village school, Hope Brook Church of England Primary School, was formed on 1 September 2001 by the amalgamation of the two earlier schools (Hopes Hill County Primary School and Longhope Church of England School). It is situated next to the recreation ground.

== Longhope Football Club ==
The village has a football club that has been running since 1905 at the heart of the Village. The current Longhope First Team compete in the North Gloucestershire Premier Division. The Reserves compete in Division 3. Their home ground is the Recreation Ground. The club's crest depicts a lion, which is also the village's symbol which features on the war memorial on Monmouth Road. The crest also features a railway, a nod to the old railway station, on Station Lane.

== Longhope Central ==
Longhope Central was opened in December of 2023. The bus stop opposite Pound Cottage on The Latchen was converted into a local information hub for villagers and visitors to use. It includes a village map highlighting local businesses, societies and clubs alongside their contact information. Also featured is a book shelf encouraging book swaps and a pin noticeboard for local events.

== Bibliography ==
Bullock, Arthur (2009). Gloucestershire Between the Wars: A Memoir. The History Press. ISBN 978-0-7524-4793-3. pp. 10–49.
