= Gloucester and Dean Forest Railway =

The Gloucester and Dean Forest Railway (G&DFR) was a 19th-century British railway company that constructed a 7¼ mile section of railway line from Gloucester west to Grange Court in Gloucestershire in England. It now forms part of the Gloucester–Newport line.

== Origins ==
The railway was originally promoted in 1845 as a link from Gloucester to Brunel's proposed Monmouth and Hereford Railway. The Monmouth and Hereford Railway was planned to run from Hereford and Ross-on-Wye via a proposed crossing of the River Severn between Westbury on Severn and Arlingham, to meet the Cheltenham and Great Western Union Railway near Standish, establishing a direct route from the Great Western Railway system to Wales.

The South Wales Railway would connect the same river crossing to Cardiff, Swansea, and ships to Ireland. However in 1845 Parliament refused to approve the crossing, and granted the South Wales Railway approval only west of Chepstow.

Gloucester and Dean Forest Railway Act 1846
- Act of Parliament
- Parliament of the United Kingdom
- Long title: An Act for making a Railway from Gloucester to the Monmouth and Hereford Railway, and to the South Wales Railway at Awre, to be called "The Gloucester and Dean Forest Railway."
- Citation: 9 & 10 Vict. c. ccxl

Dates
- Royal assent: 27 July 1846

The already approved Gloucester and Dean Forest link now became critical for the South Wales Railway to reach England. Plans were revised, and Parliament in the Gloucester and Dean Forest Railway Act 1846 (9 & 10 Vict. c. ccxl) gave assent for the Gloucester and Dean Forest Railway to be extended to Hagloe Farm, two miles south of Awre, there to be met by the South Wales Railway.

== Construction ==
Construction was undertaken by the Great Western Railway (GWR), which was a majority shareholder in the G&DFR. It was agreed that the South Wales Railway (SWR) would be responsible for the whole of the southward extension from Grange Court, which then became the northern limit of the SWR. Building of the G&DFR was generally straightforward, with only an opening bridge over the Severn at Gloucester and the junction arrangements with the GWR at Gloucester station presenting material challenges.

The line opened together with the western portion of the SWR on 19 September 1851, with services initially running from Gloucester to a temporary station, Chepstow East on the eastern side of the River Wye at Chepstow. Full services through to Swansea began on 19 July the following year. On the G&DFR part of the route a station was opened at Oakle Street, about 5 miles from Gloucester. This would close on 31 March 1856, but reopened on 2 July 1870 and remained in use until 1964.

== Later history ==
Immediately after opening, the Gloucester and Dean Forest Railway was leased to the Great Western Railway.

A line north from Grange Court Junction to Hereford, the Hereford, Ross and Gloucester Railway, was authorised on 1 June 1851. It opened on 1 June 1855, including a new Grange Court junction station, and would be taken over by the GWR in 1862. In 1863 the GWR also absorbed the South Wales Railway. The Gloucester and Dean Forest Railway was finally taken over by the Great Western Railway on 30 June 1874 under the Great Western Railway Act 1874 (37 & 38 Vict. c. lxxiv).

The G&DFR section lost its place as part of the main trunk route from South Wales to southern England with the opening of the Severn Tunnel by the GWR on 1 December 1886; but as part of the Gloucester to Newport line it continues to be part of an important link between South Wales and the West Midlands.
