= Aston Ingham =

Village in Herefordshire, England

Coordinates: 51°55′N 2°27′W

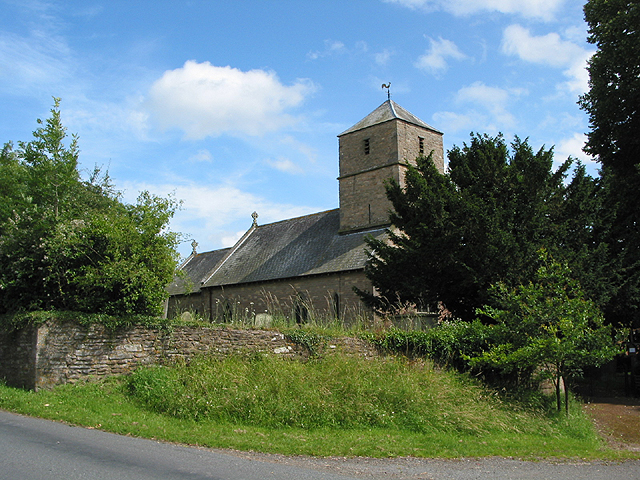
- Parish church of St John the Baptist

- Location within Herefordshire
- OS grid reference: SO68542366
- Unitary authority: Herefordshire
- Ceremonial county: Herefordshire
- Region: West Midlands
- Country: England
- Sovereign state: United Kingdom
- Post town: ROSS-ON-WYE
- Postcode district: HR9
- Police: West Mercia
- Fire: Hereford and Worcester
- Ambulance: West Midlands
- UK Parliament: Hereford and South Herefordshire

Aston Ingham is a village in south-eastern Herefordshire, England, near Newent and about 7 miles (11 km) east of Ross-on-Wye. The population of the village at the 2011 census was 398. There is a church, dedicated to St John the Baptist, which has been a Grade II* listed building since 17 March 1987.

== Etymology ==
The village was called Estune in the Domesday Book (1086), for the Old English ēast tūn, meaning "eastern farmstead or estate". In 1242, it was Estun Ingan for the Ingan family, who had a manor there at the time.

== History ==
At the time of the 11th-century Domesday Book, Aston was located in Bromsash Hundred in Herefordshire, with 23 households. There was one lord's plough team, eight men's plough teams, and one mill. In 1066, the lord was Edward the Confessor, and 20 years later the lord of the village was Godfrey, who was also lord of Cleeve and Lower Cleeve, and Wilton in Bromsash Hundred and Ashe [Ingen] in Archenfield Hundred. Ansfrid of Cormeilles was the tenant-in-chief. For about a hundred years, the land was attached to the barony of Cormeiles. The land was then sold to the Ingayn (or Ingan) family, who added their name to the village name.

In 1868, Aston Ingham was defined as a village, parish, and township in the Greytree hundred, on the border of the Forest of Dean. It was located 2 miles (3.2 km) from Mitcheldean Road railway station of the Hereford, Ross and Gloucester Railway and 13 miles (21 km) from Gloucester. It had an old white stone church in the Diocese of Hereford. Its incumbent was Rev. Henry L. Whatley. May Hill between Aston Ingham and Longhope, with its distinctive clump of fir trees, was said to be a reference point for mariners in the Bristol Channel. There was a National free school for boys and girls. The lord of the manor was Captain K. M. Power. In 1861 there were 2,378 acres of land in the village and a population of 568. There were also lime kilns and coal pits in the area.

== St John the Baptist church ==
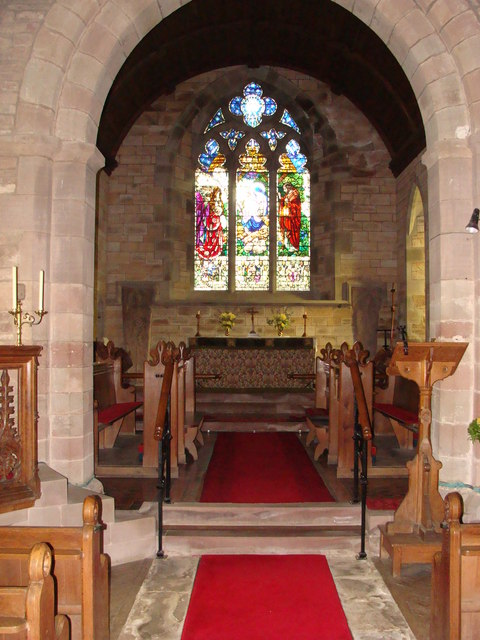
Interior of St John the Baptist church

The parish church of St John the Baptist was first built in the 13th century. The current rock-faced, sandstone church has a chancel arch from that period and the blocked chamfered pointed doorway may also be from that century. The tower, on the west side of the church and built within the nave, is from the 16th century. In 1891, the church was rebuilt, retaining some of its historic features, by Nicholson and Son. Including the nave and tower are a west porch and lower chancel. The windows of the church include a lancet window near the gabled porch, three trefoiled lights for the west window, ogee lights, chancel windows with 20th-century glass, and a south nave window with glass from 1890. Within the church, the lead-lined font is from 1689.

== Governance ==
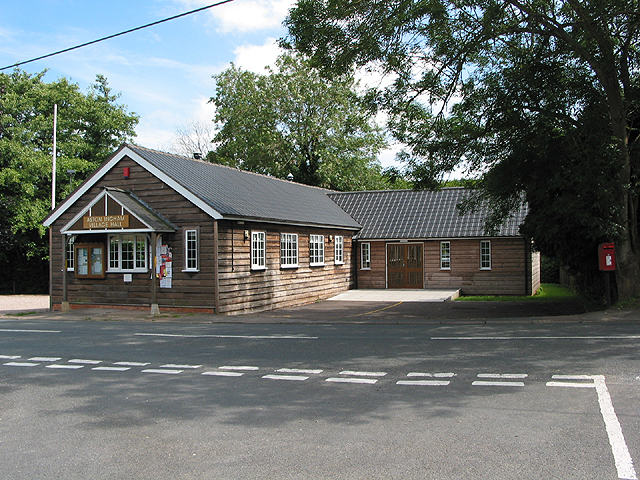
Aston Ingham Village Hall, refurbished in 2004

The parish council meets at the Aston Ingham Village Hall, which is also used for other community activities and entertainment.
