= The Mount, Nottswood Hill =

House in Blaisdon, Gloucestershire, England

Coordinates: 51.8619°N 2.4334°W

The Mount, Nottswood Hill, is a grade II listed house near Blaisdon in Gloucestershire. The house is thought to have been rebuilt in the later nineteenth century as a summer home for a Gloucester solicitor. It is described by the authors of the Victoria County History as an "ornamental cottage" and by others as being in the Arts and Crafts style.
