= Weston under Penyard =

Village in Herefordshire, England

Coordinates: 51.90701°N 2.53779°W

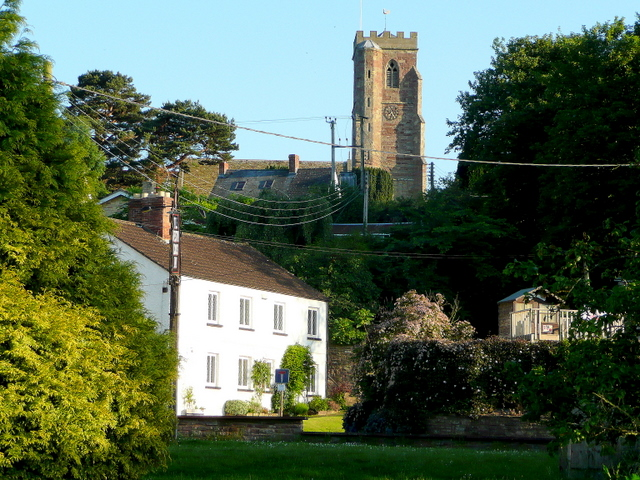

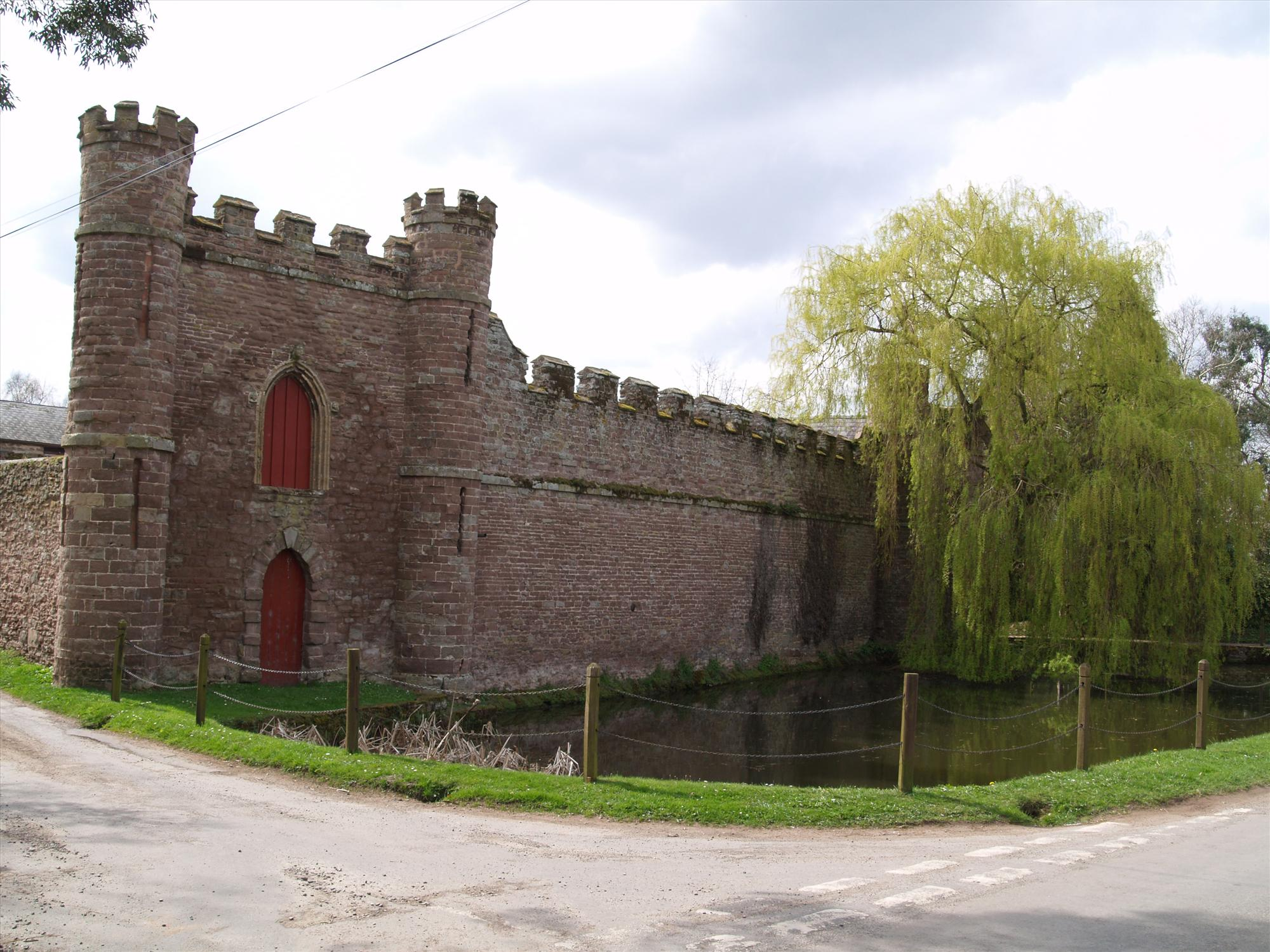

- Location within Herefordshire
- Population: 1,000 (2021 Census)
- Unitary authority: Herefordshire
- Shire county: Herefordshire
- Region: West Midlands
- Country: England
- Sovereign state: United Kingdom
- Post town: Ross-on-Wye
- Postcode district: HR9
- Police: West Mercia
- Fire: Hereford and Worcester
- Ambulance: West Midlands
- UK Parliament: Hereford and South Herefordshire

Weston under Penyard is a small village in Herefordshire, England. The population of the civil parish at the 2021 Census was 1,000.

It lies on the A40 road two miles east of Ross-on-Wye. The Penyard is a prominent hill.

== History ==
The parish church of St Lawrence has a tall 14th-century west tower which had a spire until it was damaged by lightning in 1750.

A Wesleyan chapel was constructed at Buryhill during the early 19th century but was disused by 1964. The building was subsequently converted for use as private residence.

Slightly to the east under farmland lies the former Roman settlement of Ariconium, which gave its name to the historical Welsh Kingdom spanning areas of what is now known as Herefordshire Ergyng and Archenfield. The name Ariconium is Romano-British and may conceivably have an equivalent in or near the Roman province of Galatia.

Herefordshire escaped most of the battles with the Vikings but in 914 the Danes made additional visits to the area and ravaged Archenfield, according to the Anglo-Saxon Chronicle (AD 915, Worcester Manuscript, p. 99). The jarls leading the raids, Ohtor and Hroald, captured Bishop Cameleac or Cyfeiliog, then the Bishop of Llandaff; he was later ransomed. The jarls were killed in a subsequent battle at "Kill Dane Field" in Weston-under-Penyard and the raiders were subdued.

Two miles south west are the fragmentary remains of Penyard Castle, a fourteenth-century castle on the site of which was built a seventeenth-century house. Penyard House is a Georgian building that used to operate as a hotel.

== Notable people ==
- Richard Amerike (c. 1445–1503), a Bristol merchant, was born in the village, and some sources suggest gave his name to America.
- Marc Bolan, the singer and guitarist, owned the Old Rectory in the 1970s.
- The family of Richard Hammond, the former Top Gear presenter, have a home, Bollitree Castle, in the village. It comprises a house built circa 1700 incorporating the remains of an earlier building, to which castellated walls, turrets and moat were added in the late eighteenth century.
- Mary Susannah Hawks (1829 - 1901), who was the wife of Major-General Richard Clement Moody, the founder of British Columbia, died at Woodfield, Weston-under-Penyard, on 12 January 1901, when she was aged 72 years.

== Transport ==
Weston under Penyard Halt was a former station on the Hereford, Ross and Gloucester Railway on the section between Ross-on-Wye and Grange Court and thence to Gloucester. Opened in 1929 to compete with local road transport it was located on the Great Western Railway line linking Ross-on-Wye and Gloucester. Nothing remains of the station.
