= Holme Lacy railway station =

Former railway station in Herefordshire, England

Holme Lacy
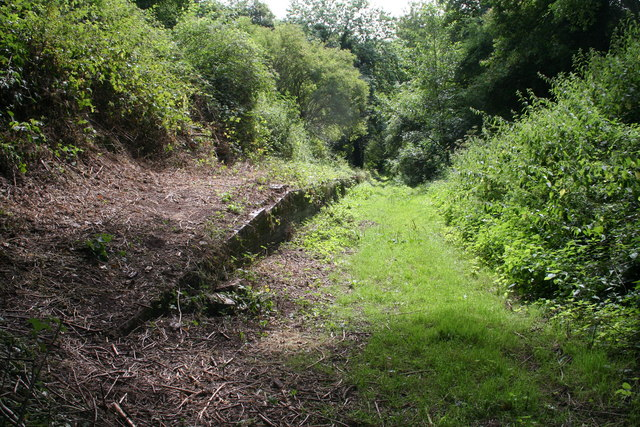
- The overgrown platform in 2006.

General information
- Location: Holme Lacy, Herefordshire; England
- Coordinates: 52.0168°N 2.6518°W
- Grid reference: SO552356
- Platforms: 1

Other information
- Status: Disused

History
- Original company: Hereford, Ross and Gloucester Railway
- Pre-grouping: Great Western Railway
- Post-grouping: Great Western Railway

Key dates
- 1 June 1855: Station opened
- 2 November 1964: Station closed
Location

Holme Lacy railway station is a disused railway station that served the village of Holme Lacy in Herefordshire. One of the original two stations between Hereford and Ross, along with Fawley, Holme Lacy opened with the line on 1 June 1855 it was located on the Great Western Railway line linking Ross-on-Wye and Hereford. The platform remains and the station building has been demolished to foundation level.

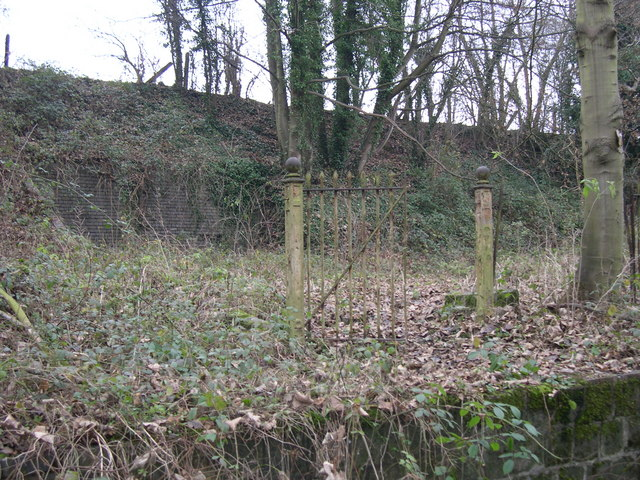
The rusting railings on the disused platform in 2006.

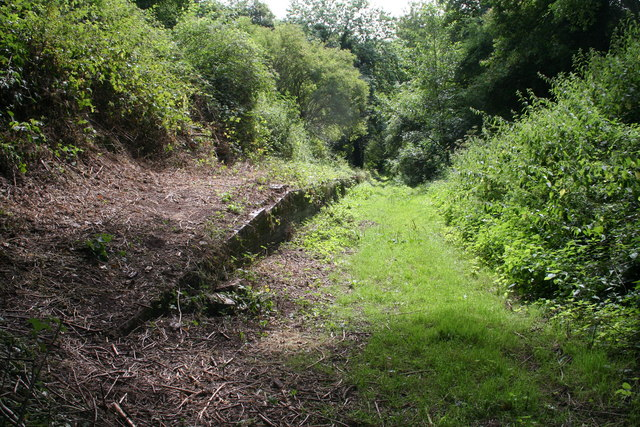
Another view of the platform, again in 2006.

| Preceding station | Disused railways | Following station |
|---|---|---|
| Ballingham | Hereford, Ross and Gloucester Railway; British Railways | Hereford |
