= Urchin =

Urchin or urcheon is the Middle English term for "hedgehog". It may refer to:

== Common meanings ==
- Street children, homeless children
- Sea urchins, spiny sea creatures

== Arts and entertainment ==
- Urchin (band), an English hard rock band
- Urchin (album), a 1998 album by Inga Liljeström
- Urchin (2007 film), a 2007 film by John Harlacher
- Urchin (2025 film), a 2025 film by Harris Dickinson
- Urchin, the squirrel protagonist in The Mistmantle Chronicles book series
- Urchin (Dungeons & Dragons), a type of monster in the Dungeons & Dragons role-playing game
- "Urchin", a song by Arca from Arca

== Other uses ==
- HMS Urchin, five ships of the British Royal Navy
- Urchin Software Corporation, a US web analytics company owned by Google
  - Urchin (software), a series of web analytics developed by the Urchin Software Corporation (now Google Analytics)
- "Urchin" was the code name for the modulated neutron initiator design used in the earliest American implosion atomic bombs
- The Urchins, English hooligan firm associated with Liverpool F.C.
- Urchin Rock, off the coast of Graham Land, Antarctica

== See also ==
- Sea Urchin (disambiguation)
