= Ballingham Railway Bridge =

Former railway bridge in Herefordshire, England

Coordinates: 51.9726°N 2.6275°W

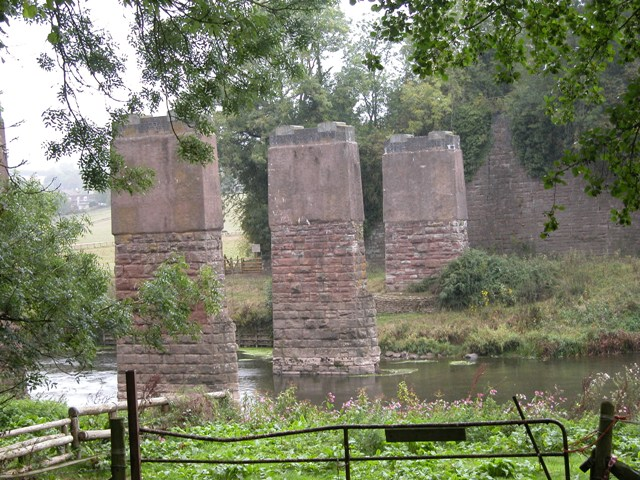
The remaining masonry piers of the bridge

Ballingham Railway Bridge (also known as Fawley Viaduct) was a railway bridge over the River Wye, built by the Hereford, Ross and Gloucester Railway. It was built in 1855 and was closed and dismantled in 1965. The bridge was located just south of Ballingham railway station

== History ==
Construction of the railway started in 1851, but it didn't open until 1855, due to the complexity and cost of building four river bridges and four tunnels. The railway was worked from the start by the Great Western Railway and was converted to mixed-gauge in 1866 and later to standard gauge. The bridge had five masonry piers, which originally carried six timber spans. The timber spans were later replaced with plate girders. The line was closed in 1965, as part of the Beeching cuts, and the spans were removed from the bridge

== Today ==
The masonry piers remain in place. A riverside right-of-way runs upstream from Hoarwithy Bridge to the remains of Ballingham Railway Bridge, where it swings away from the river to meet the Ballingham to Carey Road.
