= Weston under Penyard Halt railway station =

Former railway station in Herefordshire, England

Weston under Penyard Halt
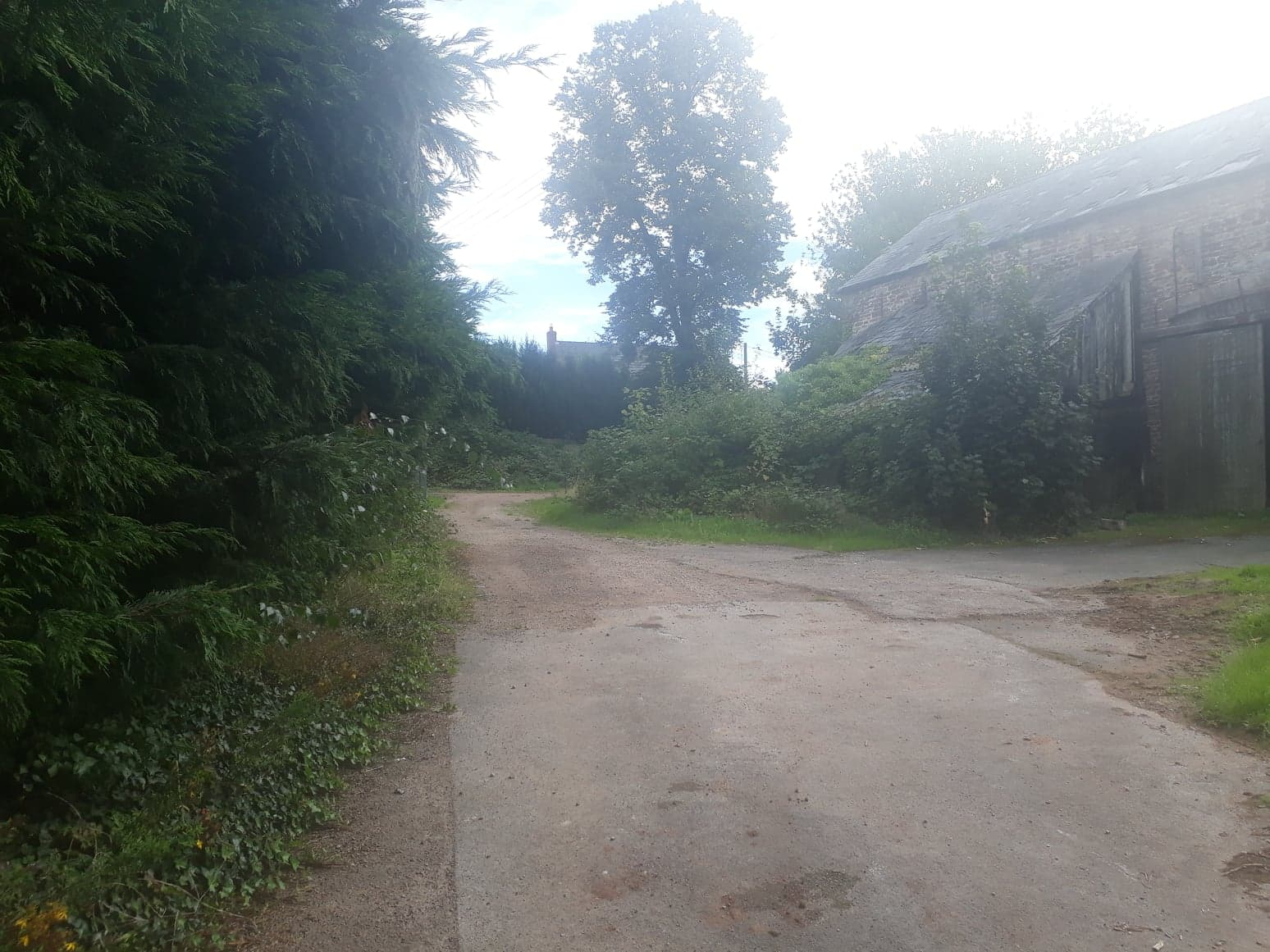

General information
- Location: Weston under Penyard, Herefordshire; England
- Coordinates: 51.9089°N 2.5355°W
- Grid reference: SO632235
- Platforms: 1

Other information
- Status: Disused

History
- Post-grouping: Great Western Railway

Key dates
- 2 December 1929: Station opens
- 2 November 1964: Station closes
Location

Weston under Penyard Halt railway station is a disused wood built railway station that served the village of Weston under Penyard in Herefordshire on the Hereford, Ross and Gloucester Railway. Opened in 1929 to compete with local road transport it was located on the Great Western Railway line linking Ross-on-Wye and Gloucester. Nothing remains of the station.

Preceding station	Disused railways	Following station
Mitcheldean Road	Hereford, Ross and Gloucester Railway; British Railways	Ross-on-Wye
