= Ballingham =

Village in Herefordshire, England

Coordinates: 51.982°N 2.621°W

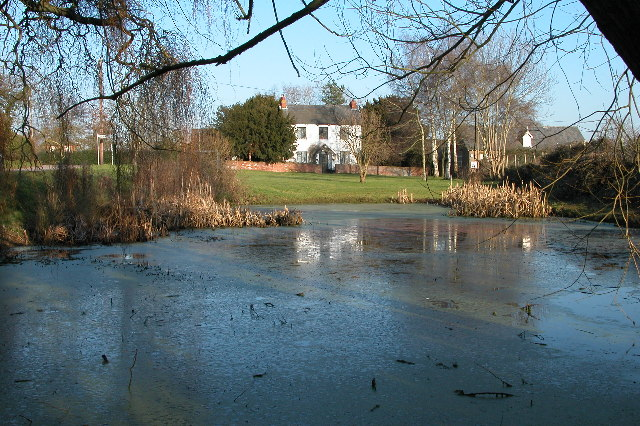

- Location within Herefordshire
- Population: 181 (2011 Census)
- District: Herefordshire
- Shire county: Herefordshire
- Region: West Midlands
- Country: England
- Sovereign state: United Kingdom
- Post town: HEREFORD
- Postcode district: HR2
- Police: West Mercia
- Fire: Hereford and Worcester
- Ambulance: West Midlands
- UK Parliament: Hereford and South Herefordshire

Ballingham is a small village of 181 at the 2011 census in Herefordshire, England, situated in a loop of the River Wye, between Hereford and Ross-on-Wye.

It has a parish church dedicated to St. Dubricius which dates from the Anglo-Saxon times. The Parish Church in Whitchurch, also in Herefordshire, between Ross-on-Wye and Monmouth also carries his name. The church was refurbished in the late Victorian era, but the 14th century roof was kept. The tower dates from this period also although the nave is 13th century. The old primary school is now the village hall and was extensively refurbished in time for the Millennium in 2000. From 1908 to 1964 the village was served by Ballingham railway station on the Hereford, Ross and Gloucester Railway.
