= Penyard House, Ross-on-Wye =

Historic building in Herefordshire

Coordinates: 51.910°N 2.543°W

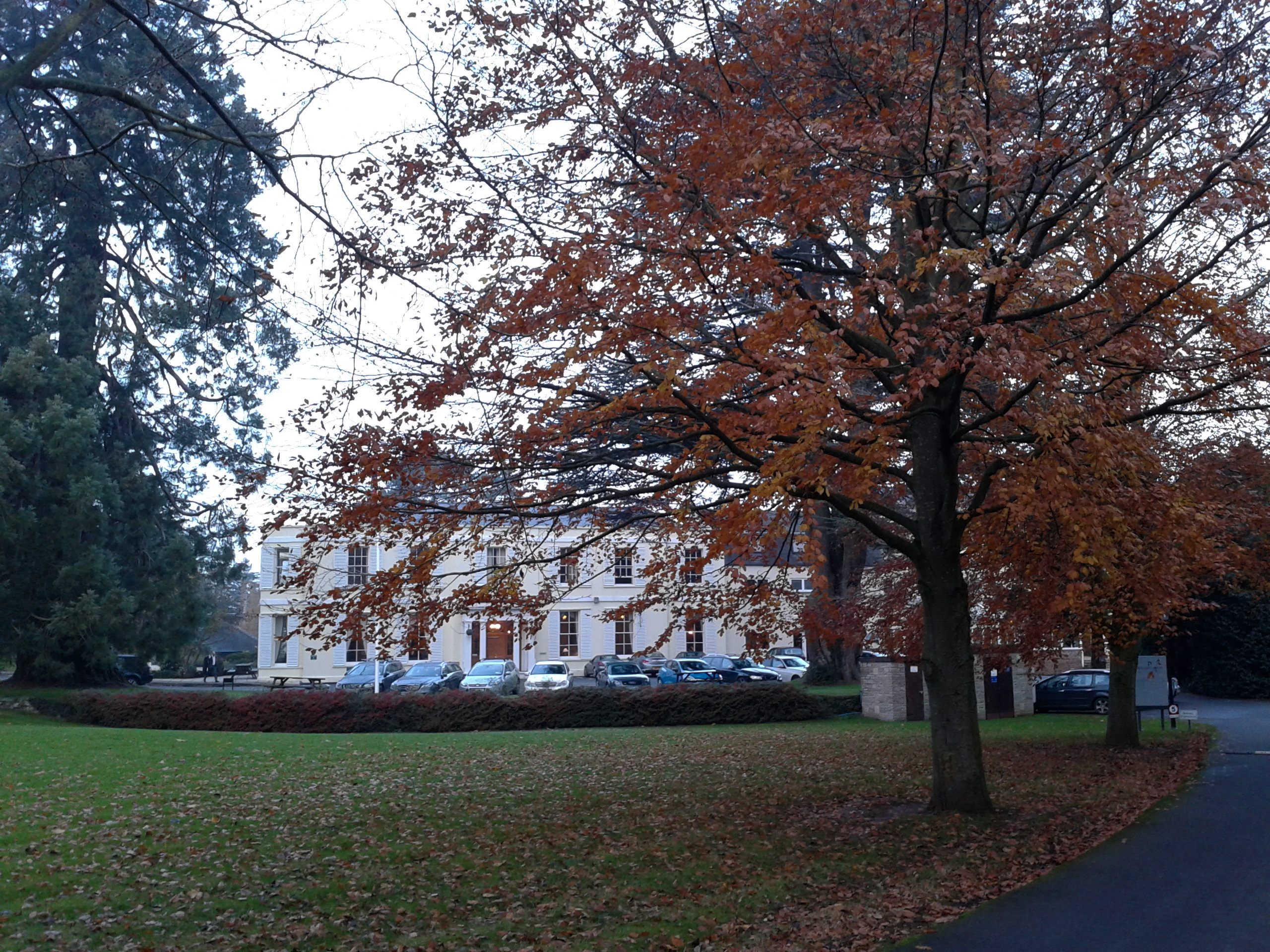
Penyard House

Penyard House, Weston under Penyard near Ross-on-Wye is a building of historical significance. It appears to have been built in about 1821 by a wealthy landowner John Partridge. It was the home of many notable residents for the next century until it was converted to a hotel in the 1930s. The hotel, which provided restaurant services and catered for special events, until it was sold to the Leadership Trust. The Leadership Trust was based at Penyard House in Weston-under-Penyard, Herefordshire from 1985 as its main residential and development centre until its sale in 2014. The name was changed from The Wye Hotel (back) to Penyard House when acquired by the Leadership Trust.

It closed in mid 2020 during the COVID-19 pandemic and did not reopen.

== Early residents ==
Before 1838 Penyard House and Weston Hall were part of the same estate known as "Lower Weston". Weston Hall had for centuries been the home of the Nourse family. In 1815 the last descendant of this family, Mary Nourse, sold the estate to William Partridge. He died in 1819 and the property was passed to his son John Partridge. The advertisement for the sale of the estate in 1815 mentions only one mansion house at this time.

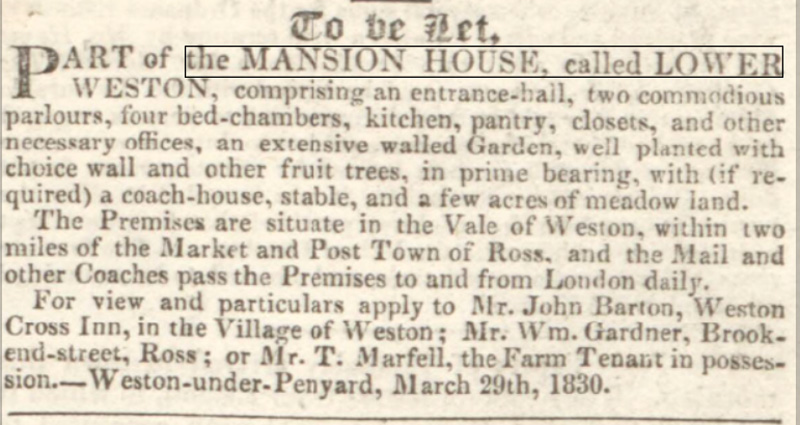
Rental notice for Penyard House (then called "Lower Weston") 1830

A tourist guide of 1821 comments that John Partridge was proposing to build a new house on his estate at Weston. So it was at about this time that a major new extension was built adjacent to and east of the existing farm house, which had probably previously been occupied by the bailiff of the Lower Weston Estate. It was still regarded as part of the "Lower Weston" estate and in 1830 it was advertised for rent. The rental notice is shown.

John Partridge was born in 1795 in Goodrich House, Herefordshire. His father was William Partridge, a wealthy landowner. In 1819 when his father died John inherited the "Lower Weston" estate and several other properties. In 1817 he married Eliza Ives, daughter of Edward Ives of Titchfield House, Herefordshire. The couple had five children, four sons and one daughter.

In the early 1820s John commissioned the architect Jeffry Wyatville to build a house called Bishopswood near Ross-On-Wye. He lived here most of his life and rented the "Lower Weston" houses to tenants. One of the early tenants in Penyard House was John Dowle (1770-1843) who owned land in the surrounding area.

In 1838 John Partridge advertised the "Lower Weston" estate for sale. It was divided into two lots with a house on each lot. The Penyard House lot was sold to Dr Congreve Selwyn from Ledbury and the Weston Hall lot appears to have been retained by John Partridge. Dr Selwyn continued to use the house as a rental property.

== Later residents ==
By 1856 William Stubbs had bought Penyard House. He was born in 1798 in London and joined the East India Company's Civil service. He had three sons and five daughters by his wife Jane Charlotte. All of them were born in India. In about 1850 he returned to England and lived at Fownhope Court. His wife died in 1853 and in 1856 he moved to Penyard House. At this time it was still known as “Lower Weston”. The 1861 Census shows him living there with his five unmarried daughters and his only surviving son Major General William Henry Stubbs. William Stubbs died in 1871 and left the house to his children.

Major General William Henry Stubbs married in 1877at the age of 51 Hester Clara Hawkshaw who was the daughter of Edward Burdett Hawkshaw, Rector of Weston-Under-Penyard from 1855 until his death in 1912, aged 97. Her mother was Catherine Mary Jane Hoskyns whose family owned Harewood Park. Unfortunately he died several months after the marriage in 1877 and the five sisters became the owners of the house. Clara the widow also lived with them for several years before she moved to Harewood Park which she later inherited. It seems that it was the Misses Stubbs who changed the name of the property from “Lower Weston” to “Penyard House” because the 1881 Census names it as this for the first time. The sisters were active in community affairs and donated to charitable events. They sold the house in 1902 and moved to Cheltenham. The new owner was Robert Law Harkness.

Robert Law Harkness was born in 1852 in Great Malvern. His father was the Reverend Robert Harkness. His sister Margaret Harkness was a notable journalist and writer. In 1887 he married Mary Robina Tregonwell daughter of John Tregonwell of Cranborne Lodge. The couple had no children.

After he moved into the house Robert bought several other properties in the area including Bollitree Castle Farm, Upper Weston, Seabrook and Ivy House. He died in 1914 and his wife Mary continued to live at the house until her death in 1924.

Robert Alfred Lowth, whose father was a first cousin of Mary Harkness, inherited the house on her death in 1924. Soon after he inherited the house he married Nancy Eva Aikin-Sneath and the couple lived in the house with their three children until 1935 when they moved to nearby Bollitree Lawns. The house then became the Wye Hotel which was still operating in the early 1980s.
