= Ballingham railway station =

Former railway station in Herefordshire, England

Ballingham
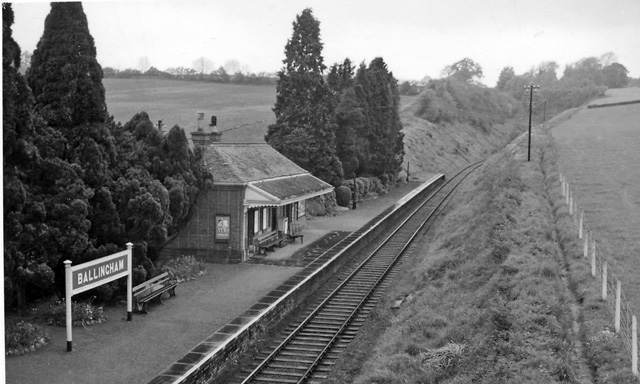
- Ballingham railway station in 1961

General information
- Location: Ballingham, Herefordshire; England
- Coordinates: 51.9769°N 2.6303°W
- Grid reference: SO567311
- Platforms: 1

Other information
- Status: Disused

History
- Original company: Great Western Railway
- Pre-grouping: Great Western Railway
- Post-grouping: Great Western Railway

Key dates
- 1 September 1908: Opened
- 2 November 1964: Closed
Location

Ballingham railway station is a disused stone built railway station that served the villages of Ballingham and Carey in Herefordshire on the Hereford, Ross and Gloucester Railway. It was situated between Ballingham Railway Bridge and Ballingham Tunnel, two of the most substantial structures on the Great Western Railway line which linked Ross-on-Wye and Hereford. Originally proposed by the owner of Ballingham Court the station had a limited service and was always well used. It closed, along with the line, on 2 November 1964.

The station building has been extended and is now a private house. Also available as a holiday home. The platform is still in existence.

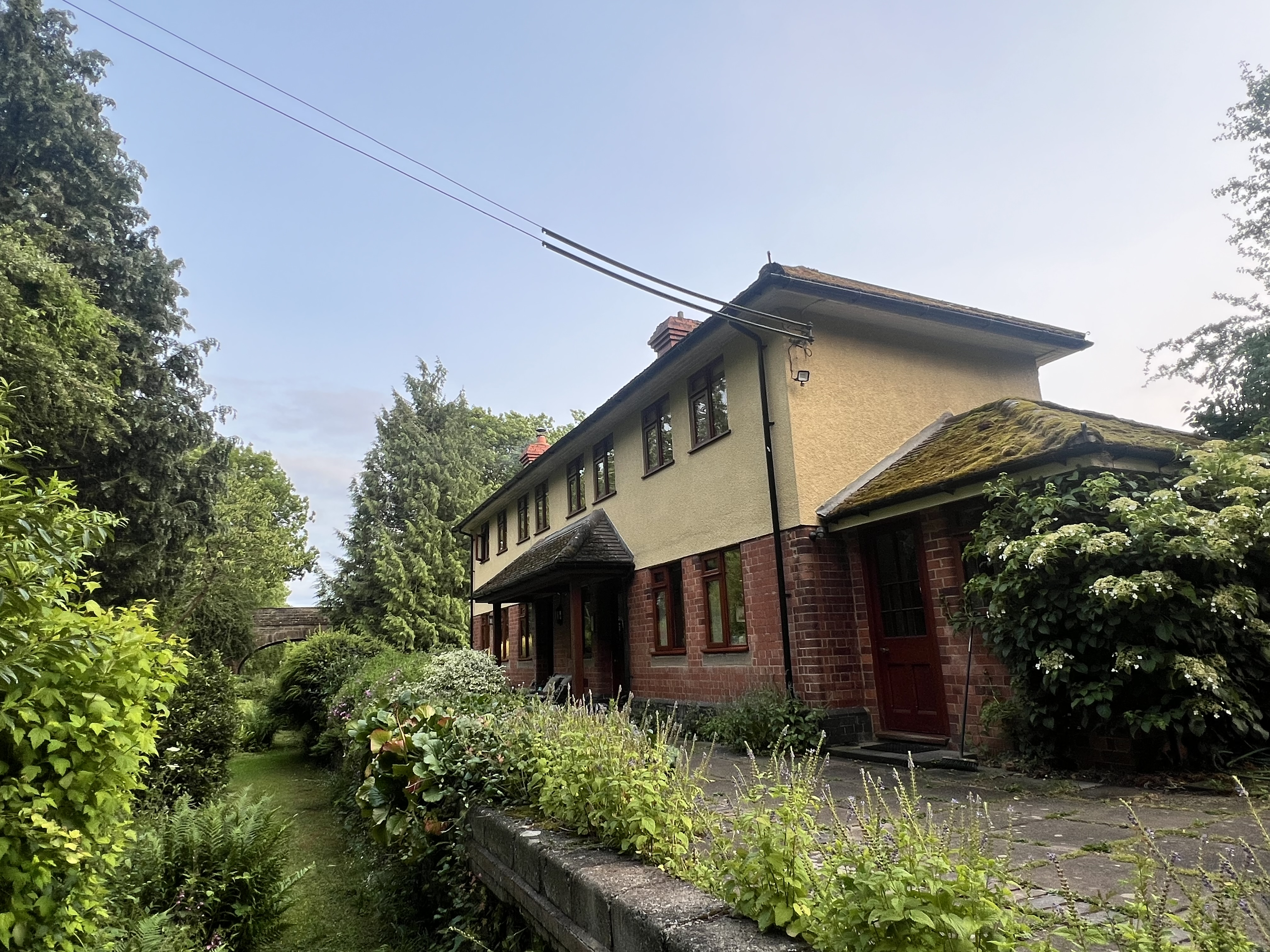
Taken June 2025

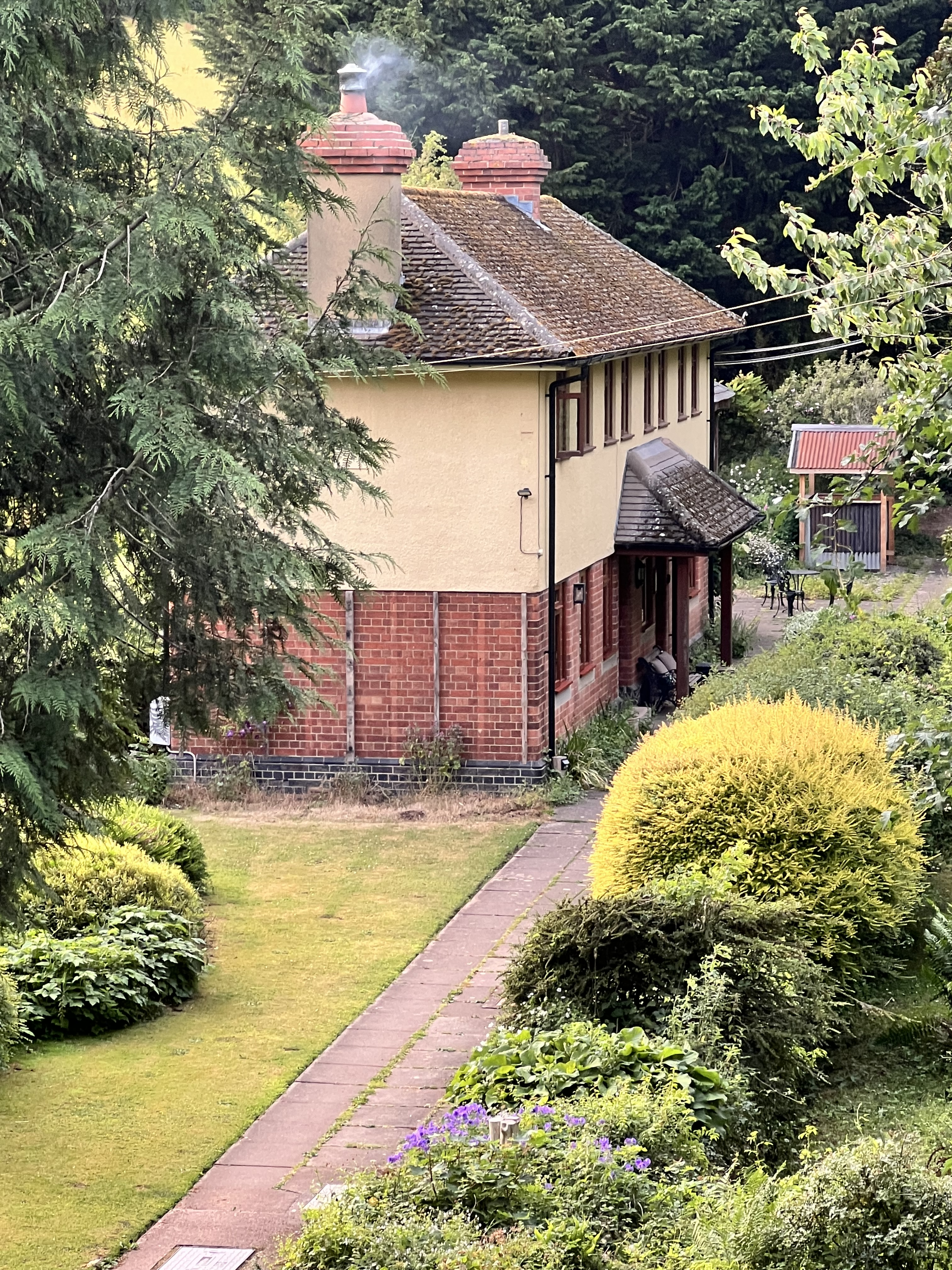
Photo of now-holiday home (by a guest from June 2025)

Preceding station	Disused railways	Following station
Fawley	Hereford, Ross and Gloucester Railway; British Railways	Holme Lacy
