= Blaisdon Halt railway station =

Disused railway station in Blaisdon, Forest of Dean

Coordinates: 51.84303°N 2.43199°W

Blaisdon Halt
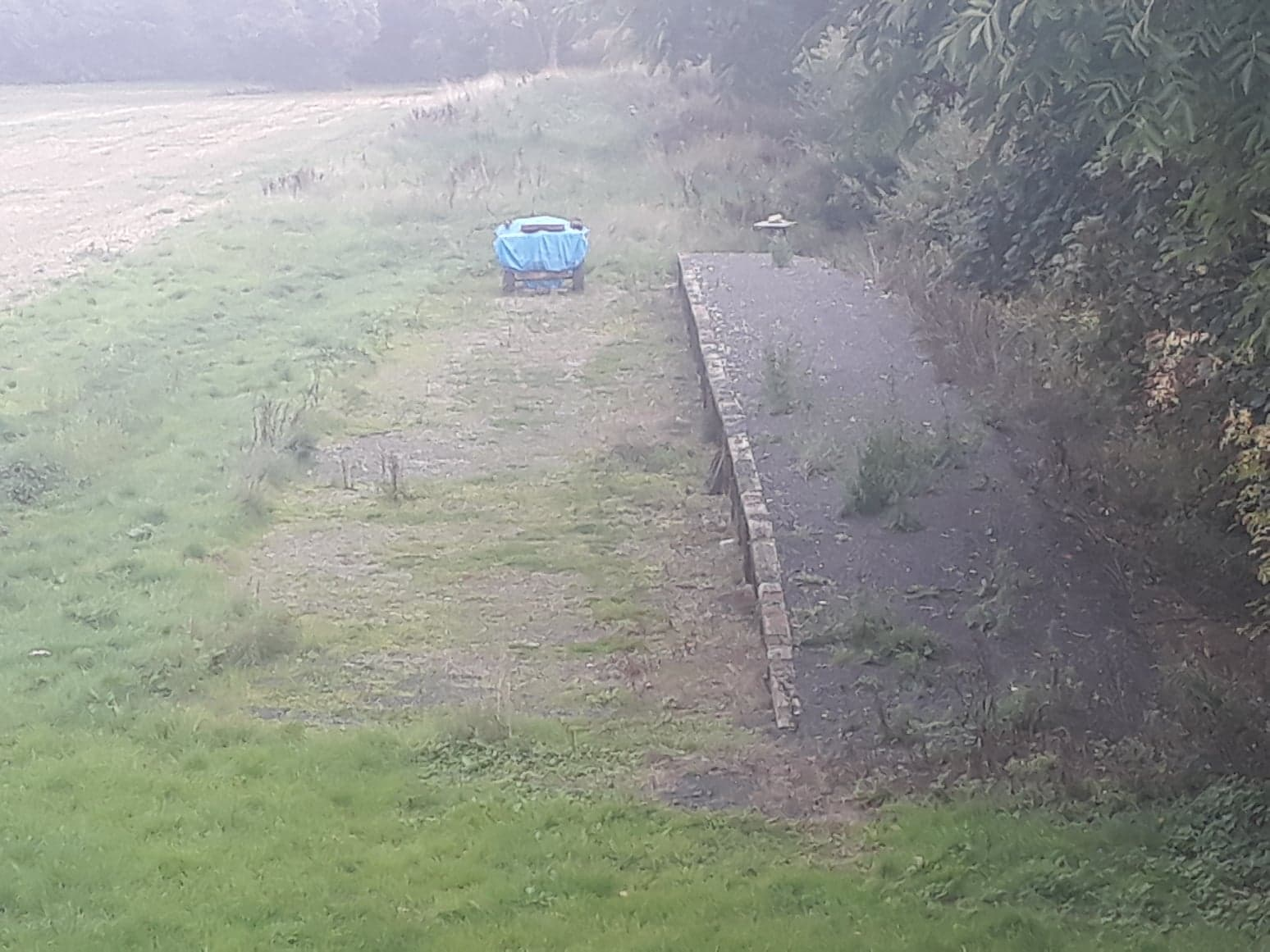

General information
- Location: Blaisdon, Forest of Dean; England
- Grid reference: SO702161
- Platforms: 1

Other information
- Status: Disused

History
- Original company: Great Western Railway
- Post-grouping: Great Western Railway

Key dates
- 4 November 1929: Station opens
- 2 November 1964: Station closes
Location

Blaisdon railway station is a disused stone built railway station that served the village of Blaisdon in Gloucestershire and was the first stop on the Gloucester to Hereford line after Grange Court junction.

The station has been demolished.

Preceding station	Disused railways	Following station
Grange Court	Hereford, Ross and Gloucester Railway; British Railways	Longhope
