= Backney Halt railway station =

Former railway station in Herefordshire, England

Backney Halt
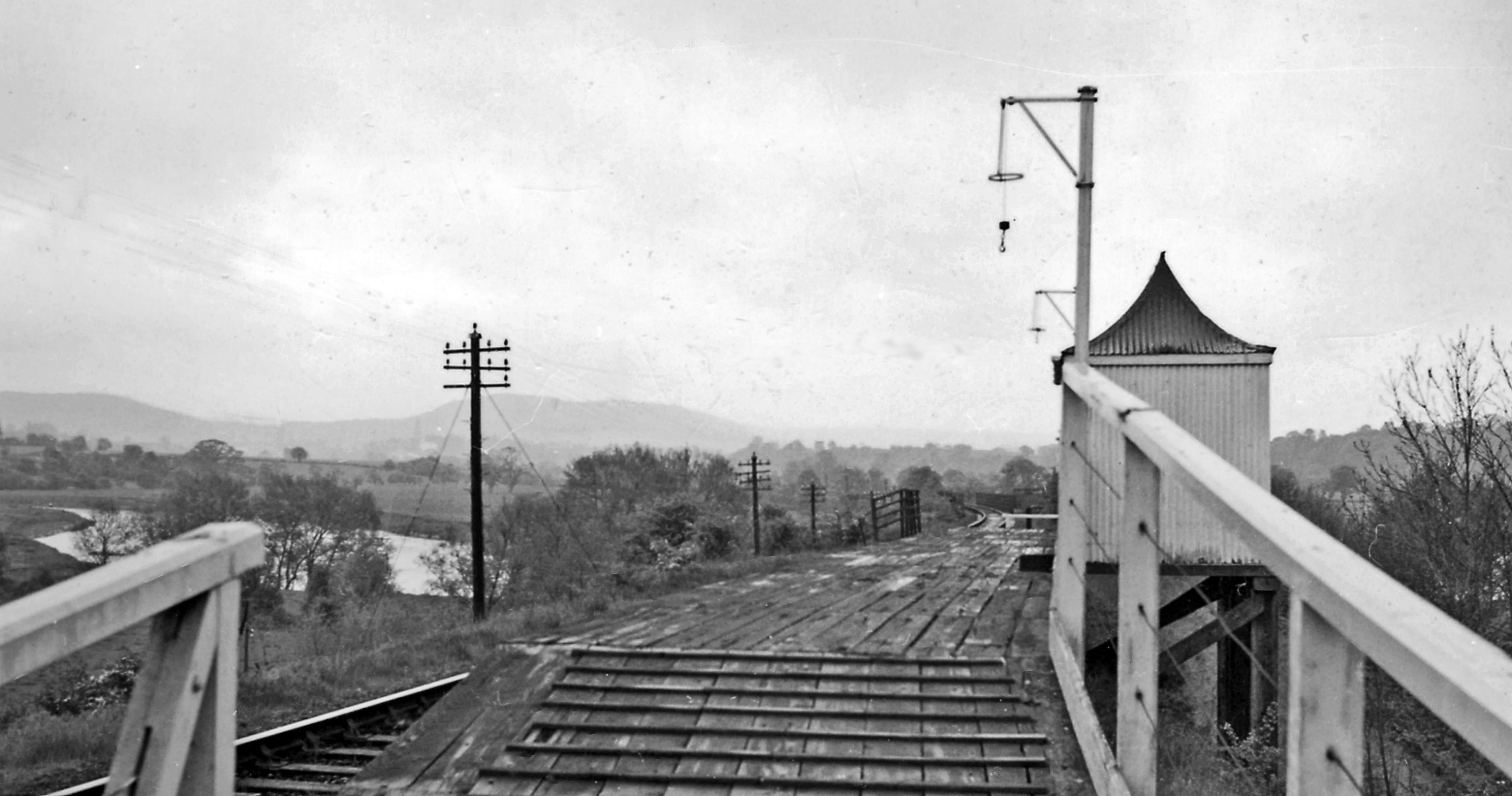
- View southward, towards Ross-on-Wye and Gloucester

General information
- Location: Ross-on-Wye, Herefordshire; England
- Coordinates: 51.9431°N 2.6071°W
- Grid reference: SO583273
- Platforms: 1

Other information
- Status: Disused

History
- Original company: Great Western Railway
- Post-grouping: Great Western Railway

Key dates
- 17 July 1933: Station opens
- 12 February 1962: Station closes
Location

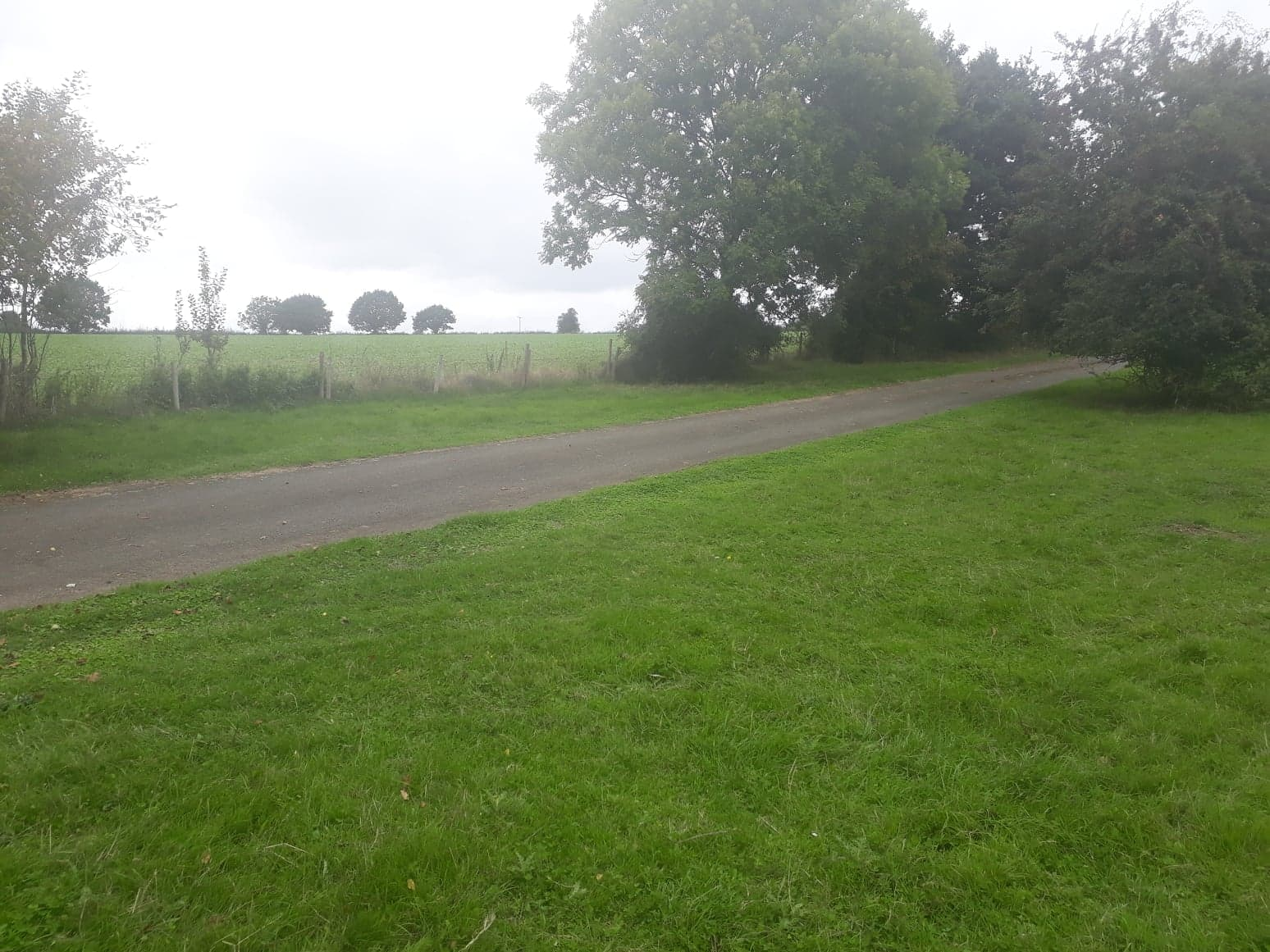

Backney Halt Railway Station was a request stop in the English county of Herefordshire. It was located on the Great Western Railway line linking Ross-on-Wye and Hereford.

== History ==
Opened by the Great Western Railway, the station then passed on to the Western Region of British Railways on nationalisation in 1948. It closed in 1962, two years before the actual railway was closed to passengers in 1964.

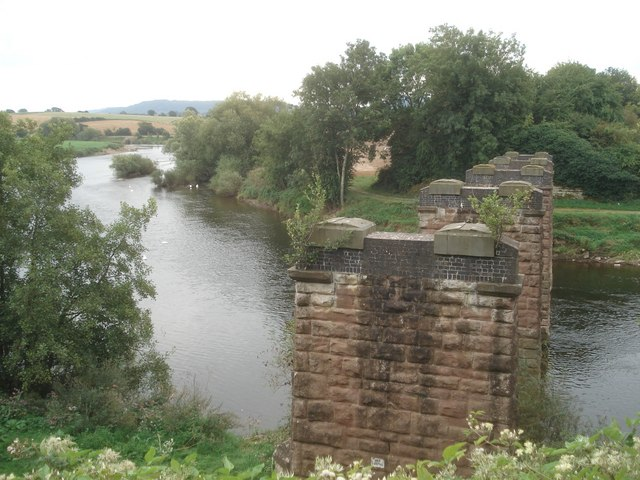
The legacy of the Beeching Axe with the bridge decking spanning the River Wye demolished on Backney Bridge.

== See also ==
- List of crossings of the River Wye

Preceding station	Disused railways	Following station
Ross-on-Wye	Hereford, Ross and Gloucester Railway; British Railways	Fawley
