= Longhope railway station =

Former railway station in Gloucestershire, England

Coordinates: 51.8681°N 2.4510°W

Longhope
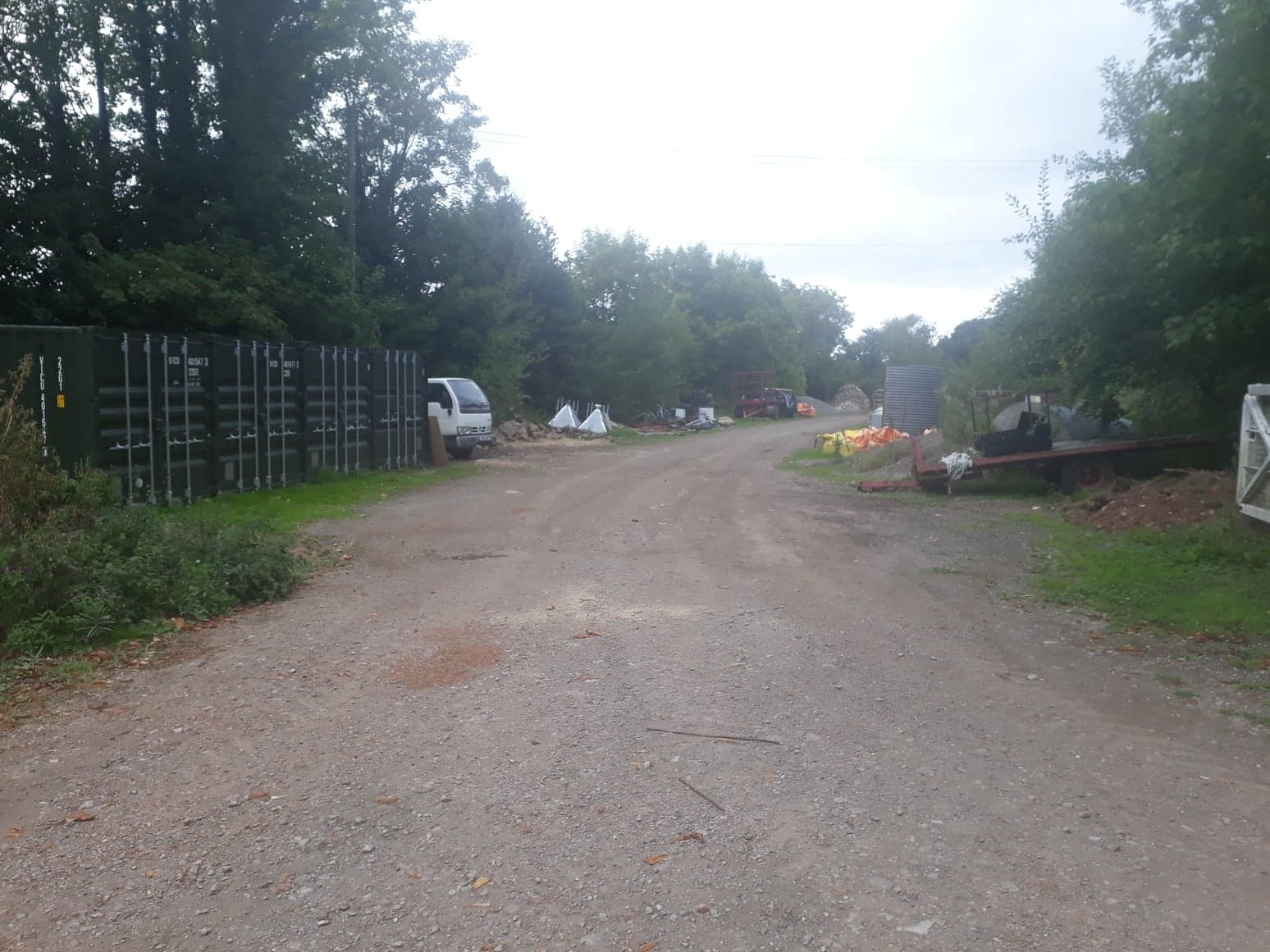

General information
- Location: Longhope, Forest of Dean; England
- Grid reference: SO690189
- Platforms: 2

Other information
- Status: Disused

History
- Original company: Hereford, Ross and Gloucester Railway
- Pre-grouping: Great Western Railway
- Post-grouping: Great Western Railway

Key dates
- 1 June 1855: Station opens
- 2 November 1964: Station closes
Location

Longhope railway station is a disused stone-built railway station that served the village of Longhope in Gloucestershire, England. Opened in 1855 with the line, it was located on the Great Western Railway line linking Ross-on-Wye and Gloucester. Longhope station was used in season to export locally produced jam and fruit. The station had a passing loop on what was a single track.

The station has been demolished but the waiting room still remains.

Preceding station	Disused railways	Following station
Blaisdon Halt	Hereford, Ross and Gloucester Railway; British Railways	Mitcheldean Road
