= Blaisdon =

Village in Gloucestershire, England

Coordinates: 51.851120°N 2.433335°W

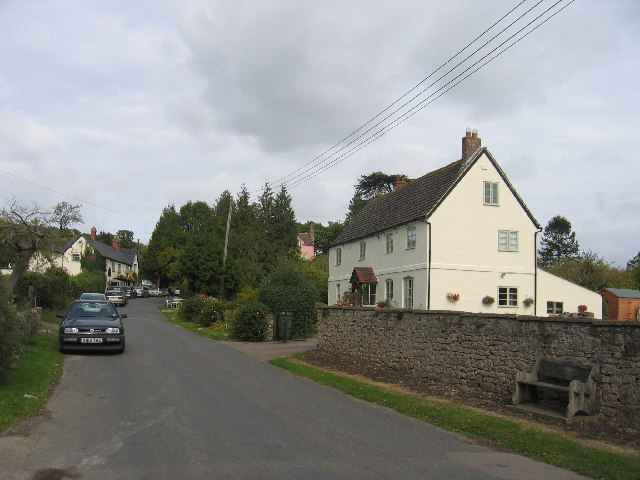
- Looking north along the road through the village

- Location within Gloucestershire
- OS grid reference: SO702170
- District: Forest of Dean
- Shire county: Gloucestershire
- Region: South West
- Country: England
- Sovereign state: United Kingdom
- Post town: LONGHOPE
- Postcode district: GL17
- Dialling code: 01452
- Police: Gloucestershire
- Fire: Gloucestershire
- Ambulance: South Western
- UK Parliament: Forest of Dean

Blaisdon is a village and civil parish in the Forest of Dean of Gloucestershire, England, about ten miles west of Gloucester. Its population in 2005 was estimated by Gloucestershire County Council to be 249. An estimate in 2012 placed the population at 420. The local church is dedicated to St Michael.

John Dowding of Tanhouse Farm, Blaisdon developed the popular jam-making plum "Blaisdon Red" in the late 19th century.

The Blaisdon Stud Farm was the home of the world's largest shire horse, "Blaisdon Conqueror". His bones are in the British Museum.

Blaisdon Hall sits on a hill overlooking the village. It was built in 1874. It was used as a seminary and school by the Salesians of Don Bosco from 1935 to 1995. It was an agricultural college (Hartpury) from 1995 to 1999. It has since become a private residence.

== Railways ==
Blaisdon Halt was located on the section of line between Ross-on-Wye and Grange Court on the Hereford, Ross and Gloucester Railway.

It was opened on 1 June 1855 as a 7 ft (2,134 mm) broad gauge line, it was amalgamated with the Great Western Railway in 1862. In 1869 the railway was converted to 4 ft 8 1/2 in (1,435 mm) standard gauge. The railway was closed to passengers on 2 November 1964, freight services between Ross-on-Wye railway station and Grange Court railway station continued on until 1 November 1965.
