= Mitcheldean Road railway station =

Former railway station in Herefordshire, England

Mitcheldean Road
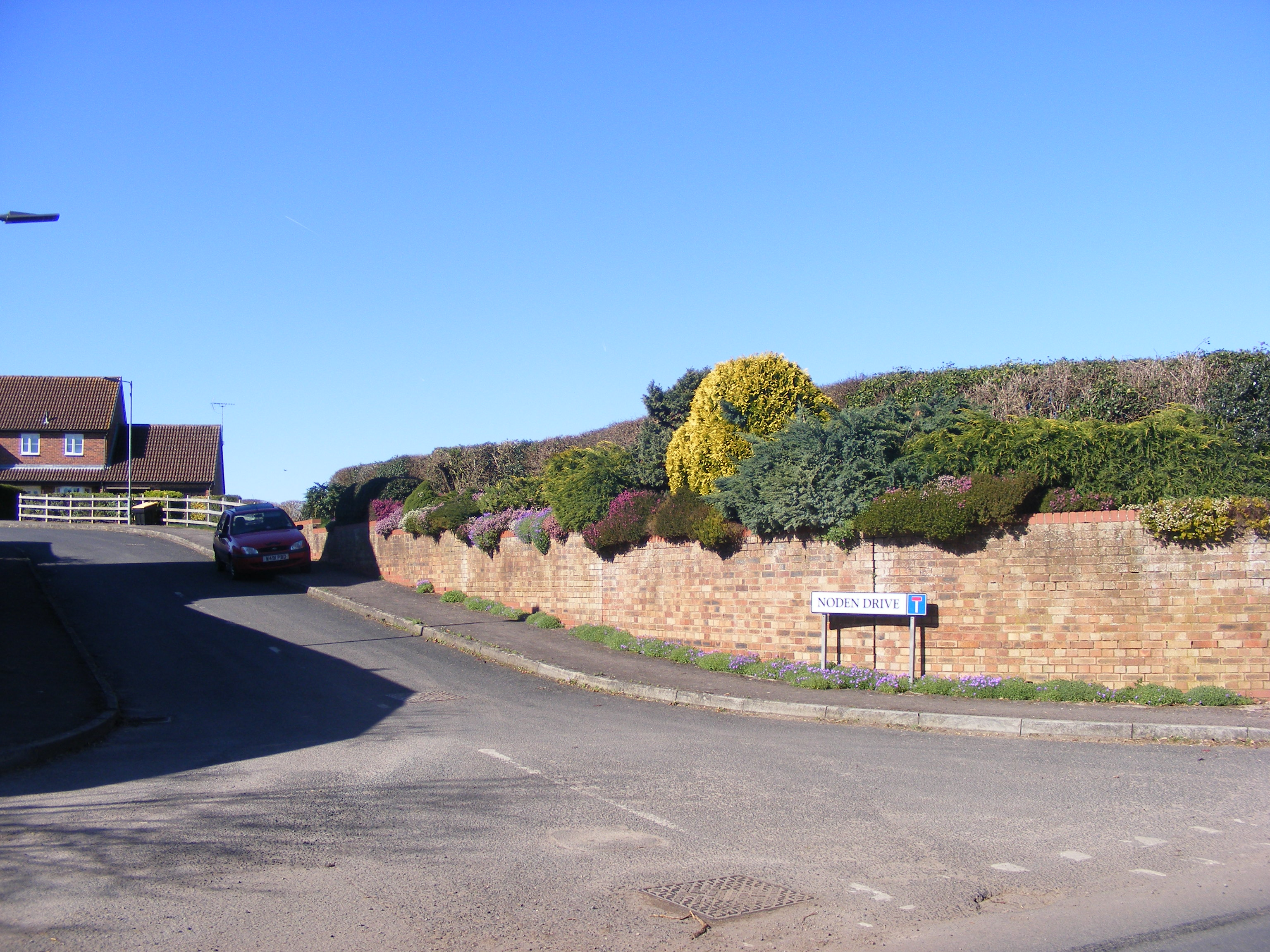
- Site of the former station in 2014

General information
- Location: Lea, Herefordshire; England
- Coordinates: 51.8889°N 2.4989°W
- Grid reference: SO657212
- Platforms: 2

Other information
- Status: Disused

History
- Original company: Hereford, Ross and Gloucester Railway
- Post-grouping: Great Western Railway

Key dates
- 1855: Station opens
- 2 November 1964: Station closes
Location

Mitcheldean Road railway station was a railway station that served the town of Mitcheldean 1.5 miles (2.4 km) to the south and the village of Lea in Herefordshire. Opened in 1855 with the line it was located on the Great Western Railway line linking Ross-on-Wye and Gloucester.

In 1871 the Mitcheldean Road & Forest of Dean Junction Railway was formed to extend the line from Whimsey northwards to link up with the Hereford, Ross and Gloucester Railway at Mitcheldean Road, the line was taken over by the GWR in 1878 and completed, but never fully opened.

Nothing remains of the station and the site has been built over. The residential cul-de-sac which occupies the site is named Noden Drive after Reginald 'Dick' Noden who served as Station Master from the mid-1940s until the station's closure in 1964.

Preceding station	Disused railways	Following station
Longhope	Hereford, Ross and Gloucester Railway; British Railways	Weston under Penyard Halt
