= King's Caple =

Village in Herefordshire, England

Coordinates: 51.9569°N 2.6393°W

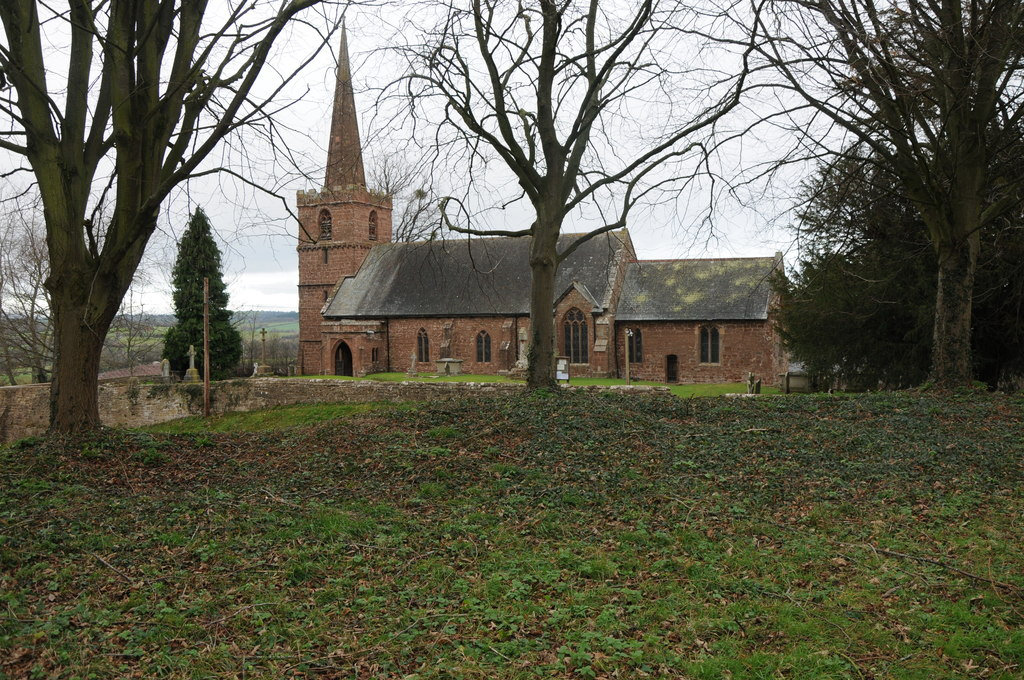
St John the Baptist's church

Kings Caple is a village in the largest loop of the River Wye between Hereford and Ross-on-Wye in the English county of Herefordshire. The population of the civil parish at the 2011 census was 331.

== Buildings ==
King's Caple has a parish church of St John the Baptist, a primary school, and the small old school which now is used as a parish room.

Opposite the church there is an earthwork known as Caple Tump, reputed to be the remains of a castle motte. The tump is round and now has trees growing on top. Legend has it that this was the site of village fairs in recent centuries.

== Industry ==
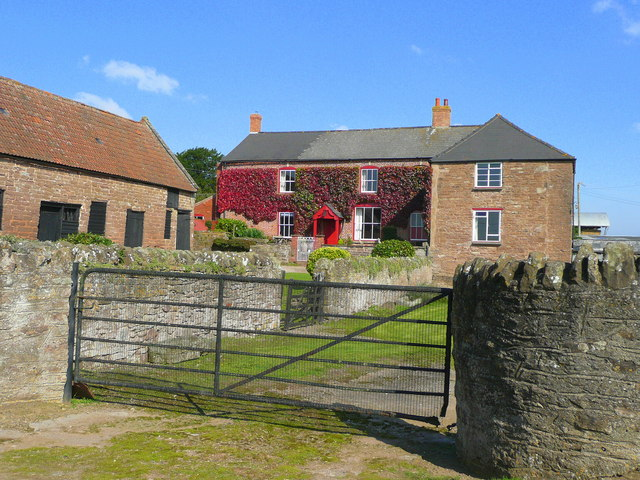
Pen-allt Farm

King's Caple's main economic activity is agriculture, both traditional farming and fruit farming especially at Pennoxstone. At Aramstone there is also a large enterprise where race horses are trained. There are various farms which are involved in the tourism industry both camping and caravanning as well as B & B and rented accommodation.

Poulstone Court, on the edge of the village, is a residential centre offering retreats and courses with a spiritual and personal growth focus.

== Transport ==
King's Caple is linked to Hoarwithy by a road bridge, and to Sellack by an 1895 Louis Harper pedestrian suspension bridge. Until 1963 King's Caple was linked by the Hereford, Ross & Gloucester Railway to Hereford and Ross, and Fawley railway station was used daily by the local population.
