= Sea Urchin (disambiguation) =

A sea urchin is a spiny marine echinoderm.

Sea Urchin may also refer to:

- The Sea Urchin (1913 film)
- The Sea Urchin (1926 film)
- The Sea Urchins, an English indie pop band
- Sea Urchins, a 1980–84 New Zealand television series
