= Fawley railway station (Hereford, Ross and Gloucester Railway) =

Former railway station in Herefordshire, England

Fawley
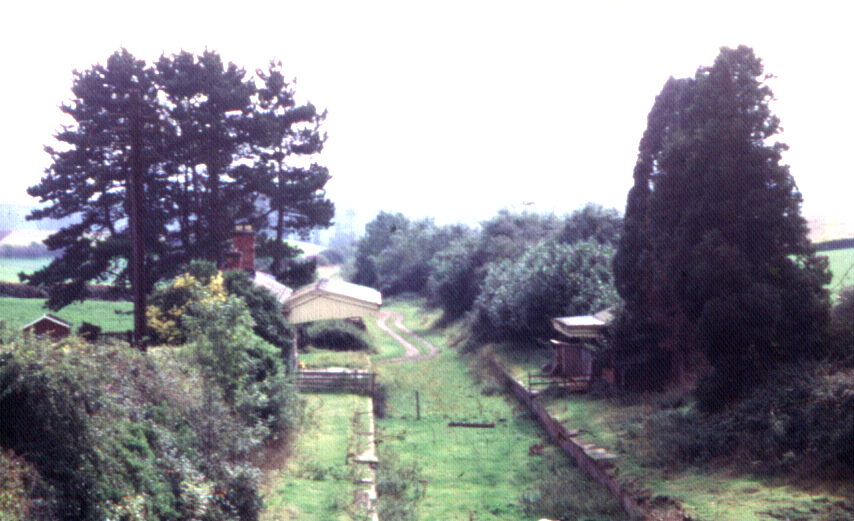
- Fawley station in September 1974, after closure.

General information
- Location: King's Caple, Herefordshire; England
- Coordinates: 51.9650°N 2.6221°W
- Grid reference: SO573297
- Platforms: 2

Other information
- Status: Disused

History
- Original company: Hereford, Ross and Gloucester Railway
- Pre-grouping: Great Western Railway
- Post-grouping: Great Western Railway

Key dates
- 1 June 1855: Station opens
- 2 November 1964: Station closes
Location

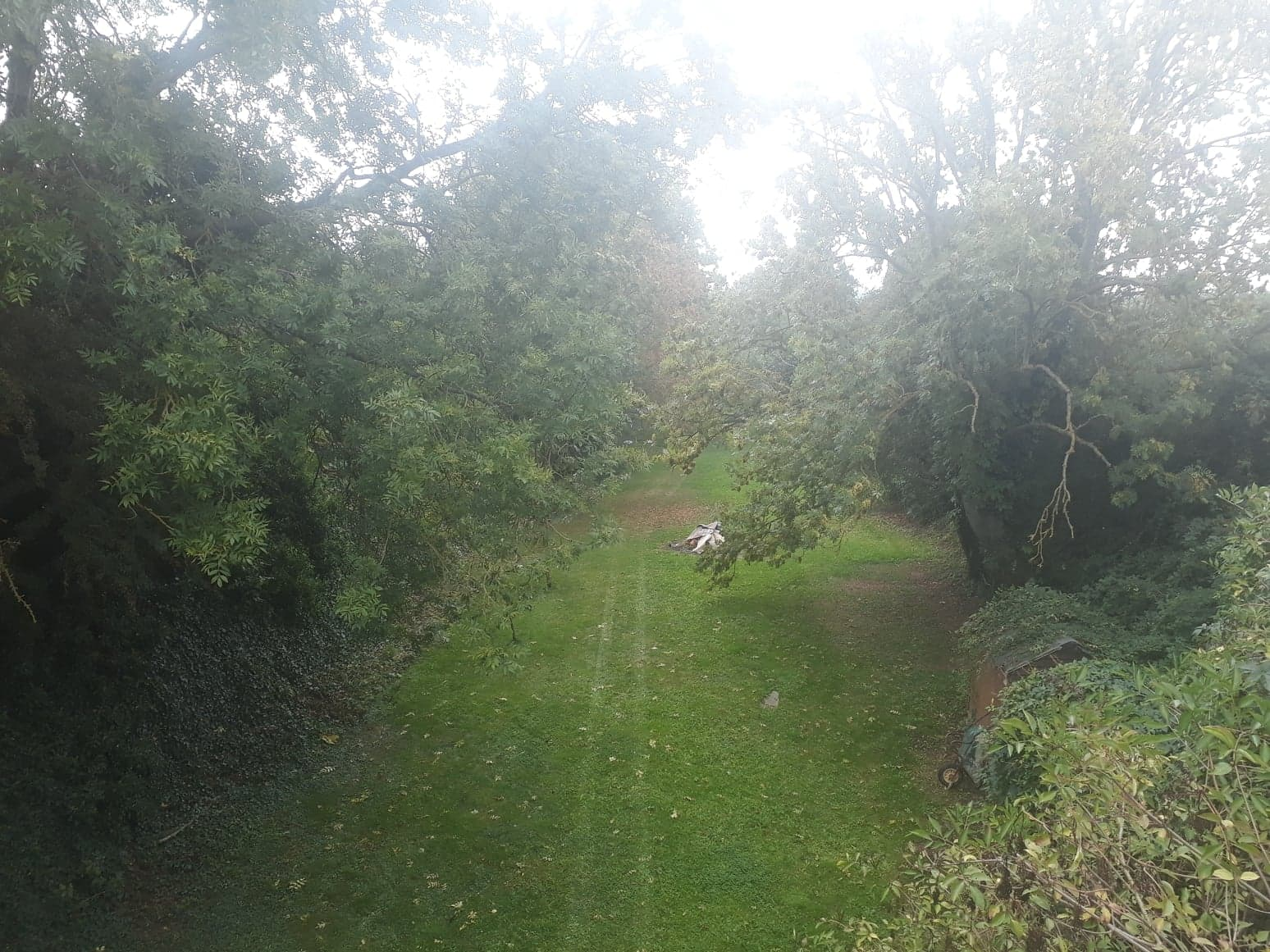
Site of Fawley station in 2018

Fawley railway station is a disused stone built railway station that served the village of King's Caple in Herefordshire on Hereford, Ross and Gloucester Railway. The station had two platforms each with its own brick built waiting rooms, and a small goods yard. It was situated just south of Fawley Tunnel. It closed, along with the line, on 2 November 1964.

The station platforms still remain today, although overgrown.

Preceding station	Disused railways	Following station
Backney Halt	Hereford, Ross and Gloucester Railway; British Railways	Ballingham
