= Oakle Street railway station =

Disused railway station in Oakle Street, Gloucestershire, Wales

Oakle Street
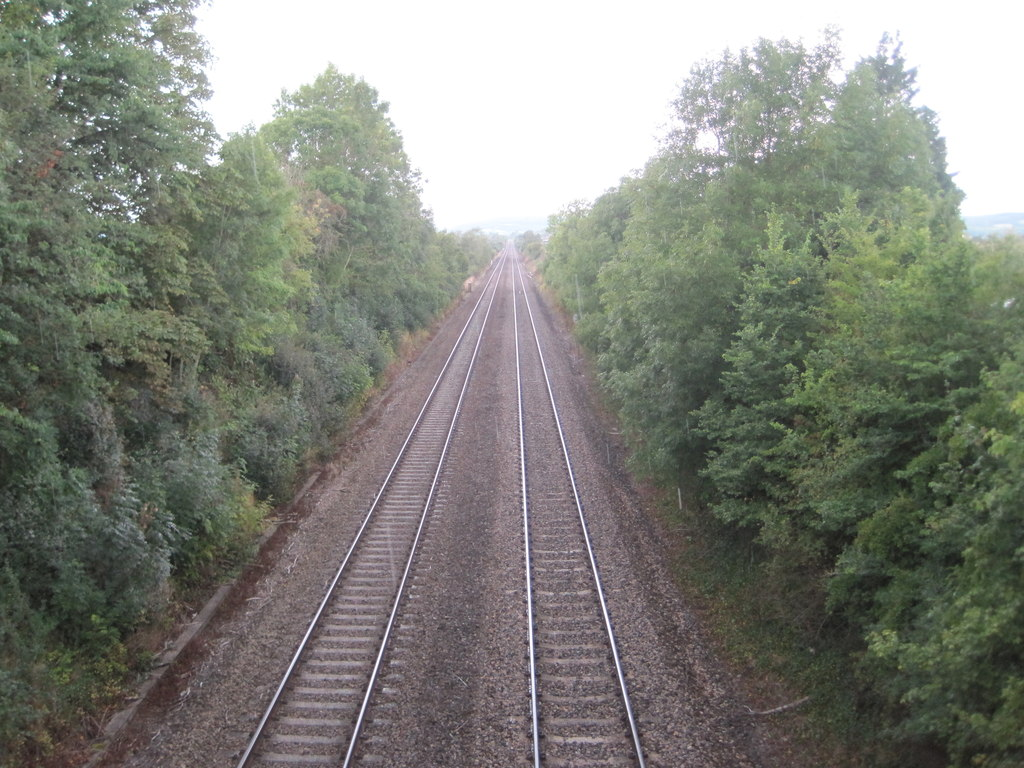
- The site of the station, looking southwest towards Grange Court, in 2013

General information
- Location: Oakle Street, Gloucestershire; Wales
- Coordinates: 51.8539°N 2.3532°W
- Grid reference: NO757173
- Platforms: 2

Other information
- Status: Disused

History
- Original company: South Wales Railway
- Pre-grouping: Great Western Railway
- Post-grouping: British Railways (Western Region)

Key dates
- 19 September 1851: Opened
- 31 March 1856: Closed
- 2 July 1870: Reopened
- 2 November 1964: Closed permanently
Location

Oakle Street railway station served the village of Oakle Street, Gloucestershire, England from 1851 to 1964 on the Gloucester-Newport line.

== History ==
The station opened on 19 September 1851 by the South Wales Railway. It closed on 31 March 1856 but reopened on 2 July 1870, before closing permanently on 2 November 1964.

Preceding station	Historical railways	Following station
Gloucester; Line and station open	Gloucester-Newport line	Grange Court; Line open, station closed
