= Sellack =

Village in Herefordshire, England

Coordinates: 51.944856°N 2.6255304°W

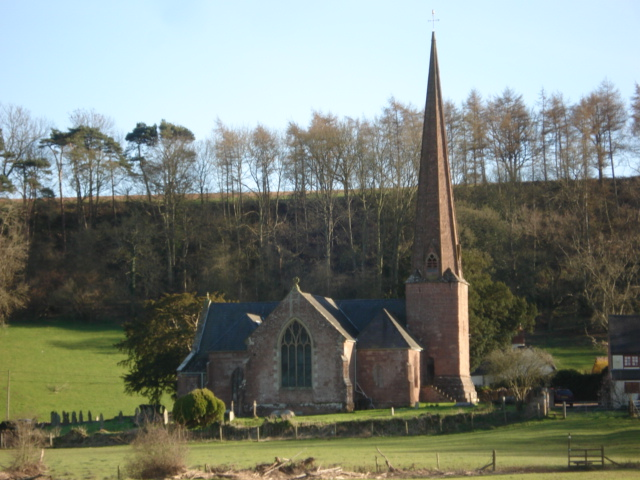
- St Tysilio's church

- Location within Herefordshire
- Area: 8.3554 km^{2} (3.2260 sq mi)
- Population: 248 (2011 census)
  - Density: 30/km^{2} (78/sq mi)
- Civil parish: Sellack
- Unitary authority: Herefordshire
- Shire county: Herefordshire
- Region: West Midlands
- Country: England
- Sovereign state: United Kingdom
- Post town: Ross-on-Wye
- Postcode district: HR9
- Police: West Mercia
- Fire: Hereford and Worcester
- Ambulance: West Midlands
- UK Parliament: Hereford and South Herefordshire

Sellack is a village and rural parish in the English county of Herefordshire. It is on the River Wye three and a half miles northwest by north of Ross on Wye. The benefice is united with that of King's Caple. In 2011 the parish had a population of 248.

The church of St Tysilio has a 14th-century spire; the pulpit, gallery and communion rails are Jacobean. The east window is filled with 17th-century stained glass in a medieval style. The glass includes the initials R. S. which must relate to Rowland Scudamore of Craddock Court who was buried in the church in January 1631. It is presumed that the glasswork was commissioned by John, Viscount Scudamore, Rowland's great nephew.

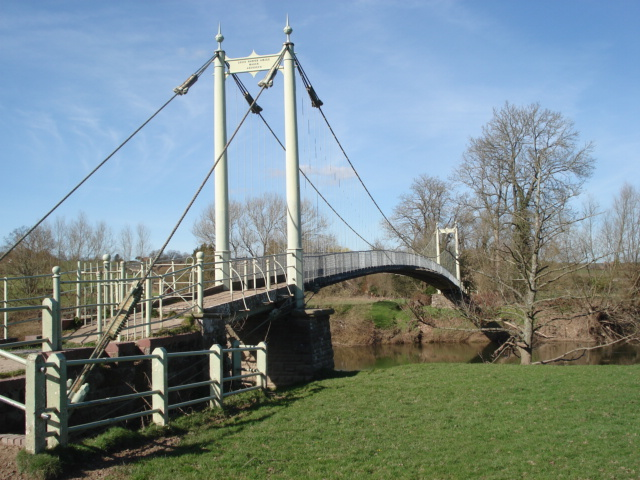
The footbridge over the river Wye

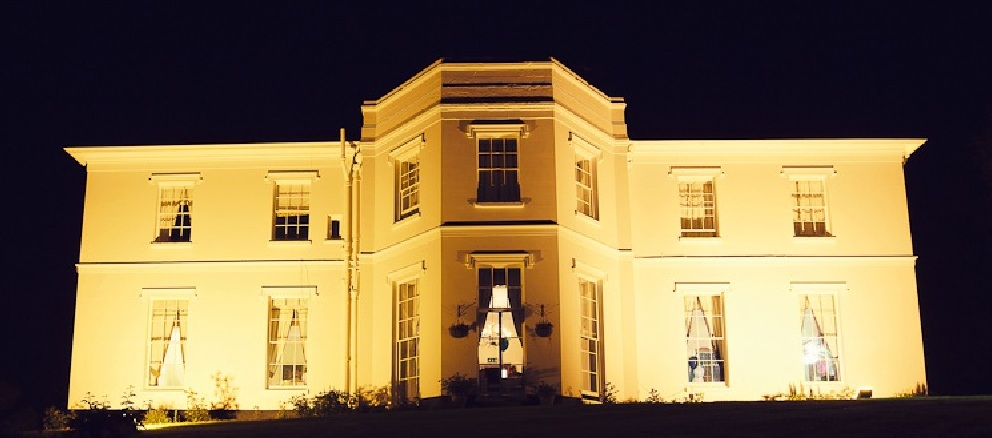
Pengethley Manor Hotel

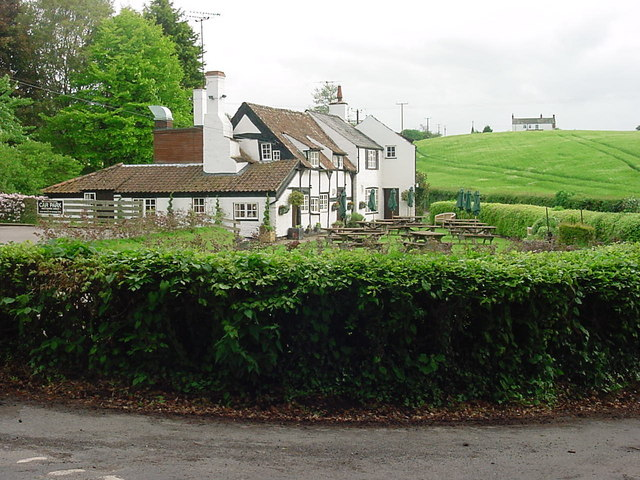
The Loughpool Inn
