= Victoria Bridge, Hereford =

Victoria Bridge
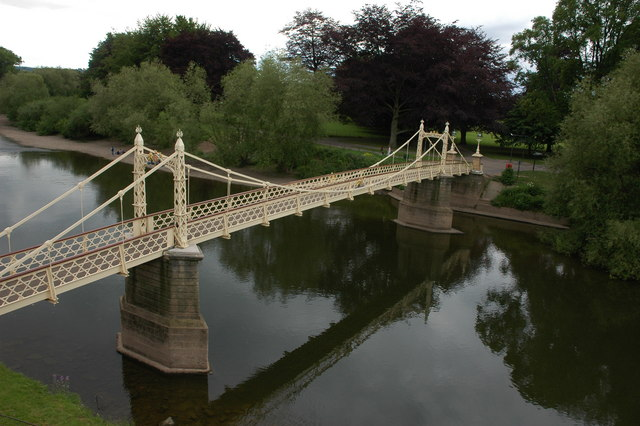
- Coordinates: 52.0511°N 2.71223°W
- Carries: Pedestrian
- Crosses: River Wye
- Locale: Hereford, Herefordshire, England

History
- Construction end: 1898

Victoria Bridge, Hereford is a foot-bridge in Hereford, opened in 1898 to commemorate the 1897 Diamond Jubilee of Queen Victoria. It is located on Mill Street and crosses the River Wye. The suspension bridge features iron lacework and was built to replace an earlier ferry across the river. It is classified as a Grade II bridge which the United Kingdom states deserves "every effort to preserve them." Its history is highlighted at the Hereford Library and Museum.

In 2006, the local Hereford council allocated £725,000 ($942,826) to restore the footbridge to its original colors as well as reinforce various segments to ensure safety.

== Gallery ==
Information plaque, installed following renovation in 2006

View from left bank
