= Linton (near Ross-on-Wye) =

Village in Herefordshire, England

Coordinates: 51.9257°N 2.4955°W

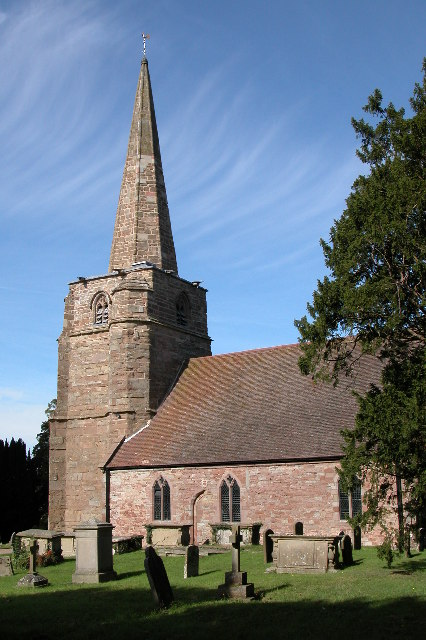
- Linton Church

- Location within Herefordshire
- OS grid reference: SO660253
- Unitary authority: Herefordshire
- Ceremonial county: Herefordshire
- Region: West Midlands
- Country: England
- Sovereign state: United Kingdom
- Post town: Ross-on-Wye
- Postcode district: HR9
- Police: West Mercia
- Fire: Hereford and Worcester
- Ambulance: West Midlands
- UK Parliament: Hereford and South Herefordshire

Linton is a village and civil parish in southern Herefordshire, England, approximately 3 miles (5 km) east of Ross-on-Wye.

The village church of St Mary's dates to the 13th century. Amenities include a post office, which opens a few hours each week, and a village hall which provides activities such as Brownies and pilates.

Each year the only pub in the village, The Alma Inn, hosts a live music blues event in its beer garden. The event provides funds for local charities and good causes. However, there was severe underperformance of the festival in 2024 where it saw a loss of £15,000.
