= Hope Mansell =

Village in Herefordshire, England

Coordinates: 51.874°N 2.546°W

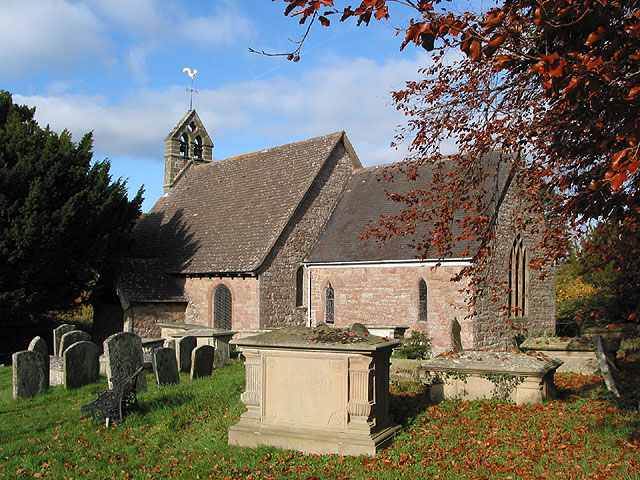
- St. Michael's Church, Hope Mansell

- Location within Herefordshire
- Population: 259
- OS grid reference: SO 624198
- Unitary authority: Herefordshire
- Ceremonial county: Herefordshire
- Region: West Midlands
- Country: England
- Sovereign state: United Kingdom
- Post town: ROSS-ON-WYE
- Postcode district: HR9
- Dialling code: 01989
- Police: West Mercia
- Fire: Hereford and Worcester
- Ambulance: West Midlands
- UK Parliament: Hereford and South Herefordshire

Hope Mansell is a village and civil parish in Herefordshire, England. In 2011 the civil parish had a population of 259. Hope Mansell is mentioned in the Domesday Book (1086) as Hope.
