= Grange Court railway station =

Former railway station in Gloucestershire, England

Coordinates: 51.8431°N 2.3992°W

Grange Court
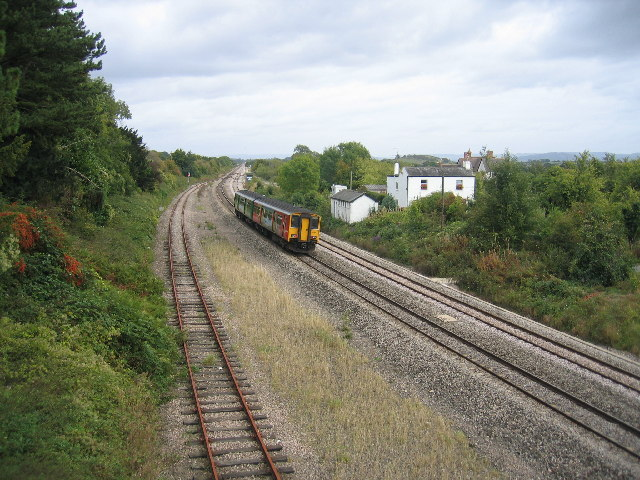
- Grange Court station as it appears today but the platforms have been removed.

General information
- Location: Northwood Green, Forest of Dean; England
- Grid reference: SO726161
- Platforms: 4

Other information
- Status: Disused

History
- Original company: Gloucester and Dean Forest Railway
- Pre-grouping: Great Western Railway
- Post-grouping: Great Western Railway

Key dates
- 1 June 1855: Station opens
- 2 November 1964: Station closes
Location

Grange Court railway station was a junction station on the South Wales Railway in Gloucestershire (on the present day Gloucester to Newport Line) where it met the Hereford, Ross and Gloucester Railway.

== History ==
Opened on 1 June 1855 by the Hereford, Ross and Gloucester Railway the station was taken over by the Great Western Railway in 1862 and then passed on to the Western Region of British Railways on nationalisation in 1948. Despite a local campaign to save the station led by West Gloucestershire MP Charles Loughlin the station was closed after the last train on 31 October 1964.

The station has now been demolished.

== Station layout ==
The station consisted of four platforms, two on the Hereford, Ross and Gloucester Railway and the other two on the Gloucester to Newport Line. There was a shelter on each platform and platform one (the up platform on the Hereford, Ross and Gloucester Railway) had a stone station building with a cafe and booking office etc. There was a footbridge across the station, signal box, sidings and a small goods yard.

Preceding station	Historical railways	Following station
Oakle Street; Line open station closed	Great Western Railway; South Wales Railway	Westbury-on-Severn Halt
Oakle Street; Line open station closed	Great Western Railway; Hereford, Ross and Gloucester Railway	Blaisdon Halt; Line and station closed
