= Hereford, Ross and Gloucester Railway =

Railway line in England, closed 1965

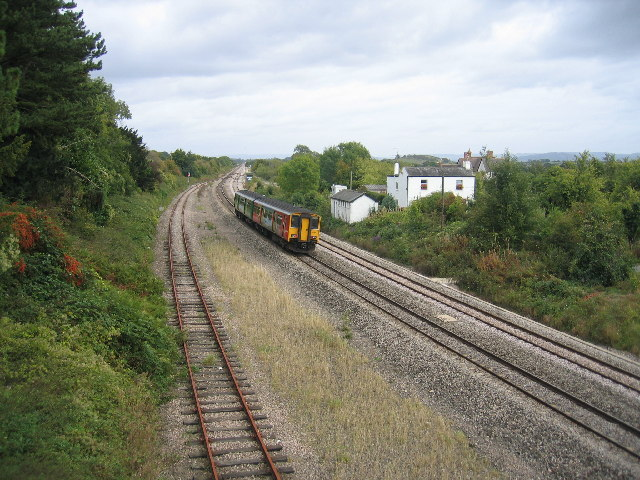
Though Grange Court Station was closed with the rest of the line in 1964, the tracks leading onto the Gloucester to Newport Line still remain.

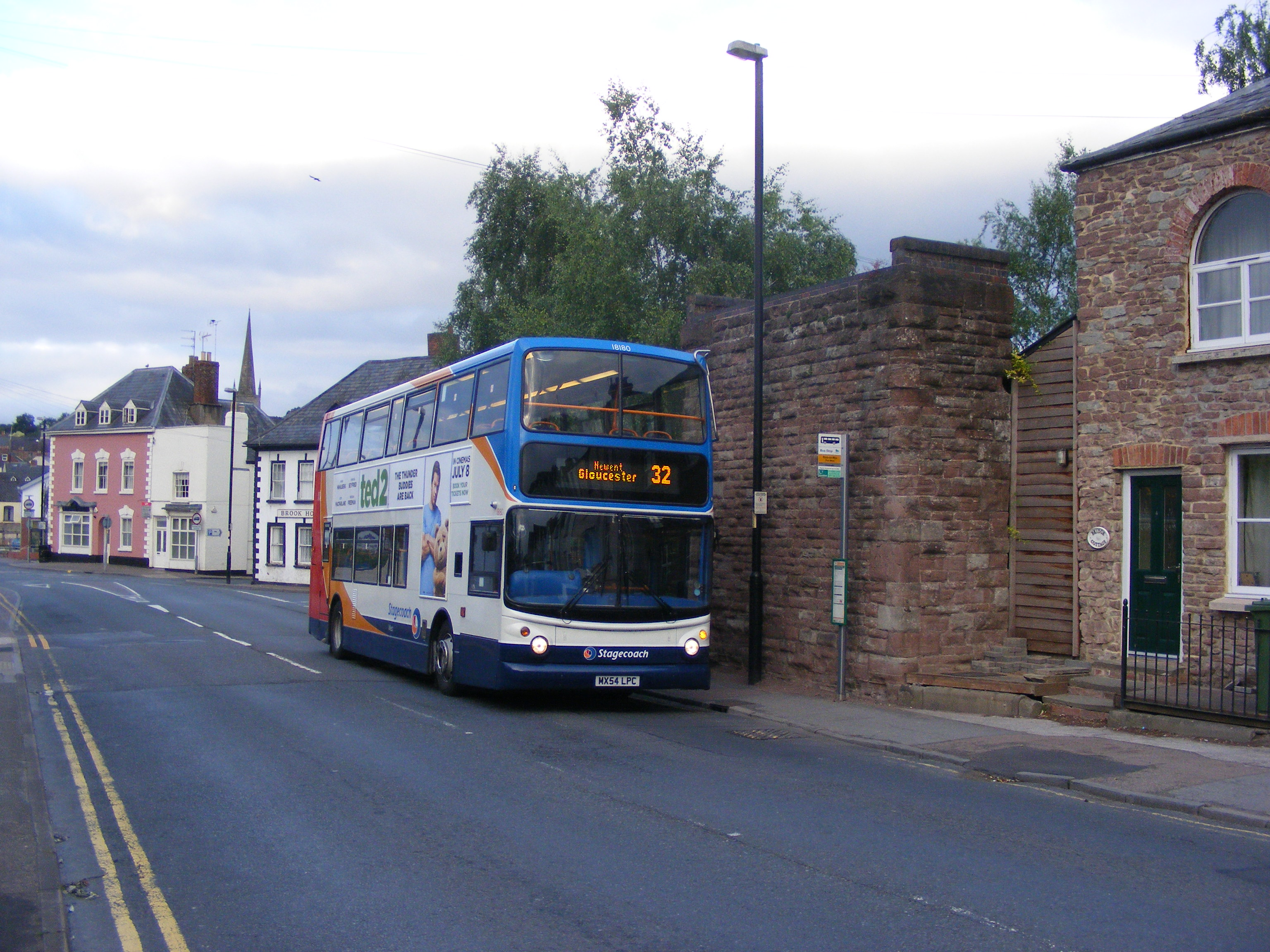
TransBus Trident ALX400 on service 32 to Gloucester at Five Ways, Ross-on-Wye adjacent to the bridge abutment which carried the railway through the town.

The Hereford, Ross and Gloucester Railway was a railway which ran for 22 1/2 miles (36.2 km) linking Hereford and Gloucester, England, via Ross-on-Wye. It was opened on 1 June 1855 as a 7 ft 1/4 in (2,140 mm) broad gauge line, it was amalgamated with the Great Western Railway in 1862. In 1869 the railway was converted to 4 ft 8 1/2 in (1,435 mm) standard gauge. The railway was closed to passengers on 2 November 1964, freight services between Ross-on-Wye railway station and Grange Court railway station continued on until 1 November 1965.

== History ==
=== Opening ===
Hereford, Ross and Gloucester Railway Act 1851
- Act of Parliament
- Parliament of the United Kingdom
- Long title: An Act for making a Railway from the Gloucester and Dean Forest Railway in the Parish of Westbury in the County of Gloucester to the City of Hereford.
- Citation: 14 & 15 Vict. c. xl

Dates
- Royal assent: 5 June 1851

Text of statute as originally enacted

On 1 June 1851 Parliament passed the Hereford, Ross and Gloucester Railway Act 1851 (14 & 15 Vict. c. xl) allowing the railway's construction and although construction was delayed by bad weather in January 1853 the line was tested out by locomotives on 31 May 1855; the next day the railway was officially opened, 1 June 1855.

=== Train services ===
The Illustrated London News on 14 June reported that the opening had been a great success. There were six passenger trains a day from Hereford and five from Gloucester.

=== Fatality ===
On 13 March 1856 the line suffered its first fatality when Charlotte Brian fell asleep on the line while intoxicated and was run over by the 7:30pm train from Hereford. She died of her injuries.

=== Ross and Monmouth Railway ===
In 1873 another railway was opened to Ross-on-Wye, this was the Ross and Monmouth Railway.

=== Amalgamation with GWR ===
The Hereford, Ross and Gloucester Railway remained independent for just over seven years until the line was amalgamated with the Great Western Railway (GWR) on 29 July 1862 by the passing of the Great Western, Hereford, Ross and Gloucester, and Ely Valley Railways Act 1862 (25 & 26 Vict. c. cxcvi).

The GWR operated the railway from then on until the nationalisation of Britain's railways in 1948; the line then became part of the Western Region of British Railways until its final closure.

=== Gauge conversion ===
The railway was converted from broad gauge to standard gauge along with the South Wales Main Line. The work was carried out by 450 men in 5 days from 15 to 19 August 1869. In each mile, 3,800 bolts had to be withdrawn, 83,600 in total, new holes bored in the sleeper and then the bolts put through in their new position. The work was in the hands of J. Ward Armstrong, divisional engineer, Hereford division, and William Lancaster Owen with the plans having been approved by William George Owen, engineer-in-chief to the Great Western Railway. Ten first-class coaches and buses provided by Mr. J. J. Hughes (owner of Bayswater buses) provided passenger services between Hereford and Ross, and Ross and Gloucester.

In 1890 Ross-on-Wye Station was replaced with a structure designed by the GWR civil engineer's department.

=== Decline and closure ===
The railway slowly declined over the years as cars stole away more and more traffic. Passenger services were finally withdrawn on and from 2 November 1964 due to the Beeching Axe, the line between Hereford railway station and Ross-on-Wye railway station was closed completely but the line south of Ross-on-Wye remained open until 1 November 1965 for freight only.

== Route ==
The line consisted of two distinct parts, one south of Ross-on-Wye which went through the Forest of Dean and the other northern section along the River Wye. The southern section started at Grange Court junction, with the Gloucester to Newport Line, went through the hills of the Forest of Dean requiring only one tunnel at Lea Line to Ross-on-Wye. The Ross to Hereford section required a lot of engineering to cross the meanders of the Wye four times with embankments or tunnels crossing the neck of each one.

== Stations ==
There were eight main stations, Grange Court, Longhope, Mitcheldean Road, Ross-on-Wye, Fawley, Ballingham, Holme Lacy and Hereford. There were also three halts, Blaisdon Halt, Weston under Penyard Halt and Backney Halt.
