= John Hoskyns =

John Hoskyns may refer to:

- Sir John Hoskyns (policy advisor) (1927–2014), policy advisor to Margaret Thatcher
- Sir John Hoskyns, 2nd Baronet (1634–1705), president of the Royal Society (1682–83)
- Sir John Hoskyns, 9th Baronet (1817–1911) of the Hoskyns baronets
- Sir John Hoskyns, 15th Baronet (1926–1956), English cricketer, British Army officer, barrister and clergyman

== See also ==
- John Hoskins (disambiguation)
