= Harewood =

Harewood may refer to:

== Places ==
- Harewood, West Yorkshire, a village and civil parish in the City of Leeds metropolitan borough, West Yorkshire, England
  - Harewood (ward), an electoral ward of the Leeds City Council
- Harewood, British Columbia, Canada
- Harewood, Herefordshire, England
- Harewood, New Zealand, a suburb of Christchurch
- Harewood (West Virginia), a historic house near Charles Town, Jefferson County, West Virginia, U.S.
- Harewood, West Virginia, a settlement in Fayette County, West Virginia, United States

== People ==
- Harewood (surname)
- Earl of Harewood

== Other ==
- Harewood (farm), a farm in Meadows, South Australia, once owned by Sir Douglas Mawson
- Harewood, Koo Wee Rup, a heritage-listed house in Melbourne, Victoria, Australia
- Harewood (material), wood that has been chemically treated to change its color
- Harewood Castle, near Leeds, England
- Harewood House, West Yorkshire
- Harewood Park, estate in Herefordshire, England, owned by the Duchy of Cornwall, tipped to be the future home of Prince William and Catherine Middleton
- Harewood speed Hillclimb
