= Edwyn Hoskyns =

Edwyn Hoskyns may refer to:

- Sir Edwyn Hoskyns, 12th Baronet (1851–1925), British Anglican bishop, Bishop of Southwell, 1904–1925
- Sir Edwyn Hoskyns, 13th Baronet (1884–1937), British Anglican priest and theologian, son of the above
- Sir Edwyn Wren Hoskyns, 17th Baronet (1956–2015), British paediatrician, great-grandson of the above
