= Edwyn =

Edwyn is a given name. Notable people with the name include:

- Edwyn Alexander-Sinclair (1865–1945), British Royal Navy officer
- Edwyn ap Gwriad, Welsh king of Gwent from 1015 to 1045
- Edwyn Bevan (1870–1943), English philosopher and historian of the Hellenistic world
- Edwyn Burnaby (1798–1867) (1798–1867), English landowner, of Baggrave Hall, Leicestershire
- Edwyn Collins (born 1959), Scottish musician, playing mostly electric guitar-driven pop
- Edwyn Gray, British author who specialises in naval writing
- Edwyn E. Mason (1913–2003), New York politician
- Edwyn Owen (1936–2007), American Olympic ice hockey player
- Edwyn Scudamore-Stanhope, 10th Earl of Chesterfield (1854–1933), British peer and courtier
- Edwyn Sherard Burnaby (1830–1883), British major-general and Conservative Party Member of Parliament
- Sir Edwyn Hoskyns, 12th Baronet (1851–1925), Bishop in the Church of England
- Sir Edwyn Hoskyns, 13th Baronet (1884–1937), priest of the Church of England, theologian
