= John Hoskins =

John Hoskins may refer to:

- John Hoskins (footballer), (born 1931), English footballer
- John Hoskins (officer) (1898–1964), American navy admiral during World War II and Korean War
- John Hoskins (painter) (died 1664), English miniature painter
- John Hoskins (poet) (1566–1638), English poet
- Johnnie Hoskins (1892–1987), U.K. speedway rider

== See also ==
- John Hoskins Stone (1749–1804), American painter and politician
- John Hoskin (1921–1990), British sculptor
- John Hosking (disambiguation)
- John Hoskyns (disambiguation)
