= Pencoyd =

Hamlet in Herefordshire, England

Coordinates: 51.935°N 2.70534°W

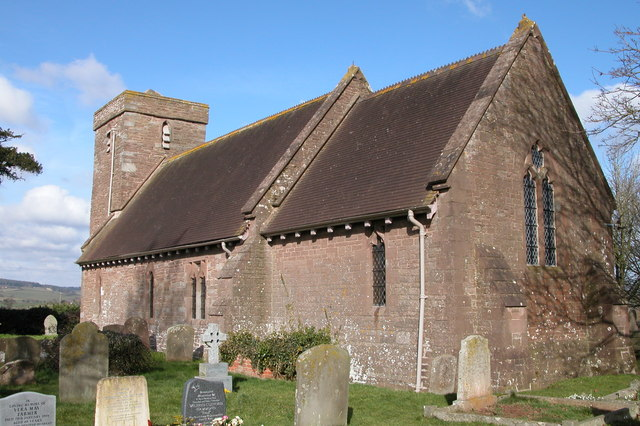
- St Dennis' Church, Pencoyd

- Location within Herefordshire
- OS grid reference: SO516262
  - London: 115 mi (185 km) ESE
- Civil parish: Pencoyd
- Unitary authority: Herefordshire
- Ceremonial county: Herefordshire
- Region: West Midlands
- Country: England
- Sovereign state: United Kingdom
- Post town: Hereford
- Postcode district: HR2
- Dialling code: 01981
- Police: West Mercia
- Fire: Hereford and Worcester
- Ambulance: West Midlands
- UK Parliament: Hereford and South Herefordshire

Pencoyd is a hamlet and civil parish in Herefordshire, England. The parish, which also includes the hamlet of Netherton and part of the hamlet of Harewood End, both to the east of Pencoyd hamlet, is approximately 8 miles (13 km) south from the city and county town of Hereford and 5 miles (8 km) west-northwest from the market town of Ross-on-Wye.

== History ==
Pencoyd in 1291 was written as "Pencoyt". The name derives from the Celtic 'penn' with 'coid', meaning 'wood's end'.

In 1848 the parish was in the Ross (Ross-on-Wye) Union—poor relief provision set up under the Poor Law Amendment Act 1834—and in the upper division of the Hundred of Wormelow (or Weomelow). Inhabitants numbered 225, within an area of 860 acres (350 hectares). Lewis states that "the soil is productive, and inferior sandstone is obtained". It was intersected by the road from Hereford to Ross. The living was a perpetual curacy, united to that of Marstow, and endowed with tithes due to the incumbent priest, being typically one-tenth of the produce or profits of parish land. The tithes were partly in the hands of the Dean and Chapter of Hereford, and there were about 14 acres (5.7 hectares) of rectorial glebe, being an area of land set aside to support a parish priest.

In 1856-58 Pencoyd was described as a township, small parish and village. The parish was in the Ross-on-Wye county court district, again in the Ross Union, and the Harewood Petty Sessions. The ecclesiastical parish was in the Hereford archdeaconry and bishopric. The church was described as "an old stone building, with small square tower in ancient style, but in a very delapidated condition"; a sycamore tree was growing in the wall, and an elder in the roof of the tower. It comprised a nave, tower, north porch, a "very old stone font" and three bells. The living was a perpetual curracy in gift of the Ecclesiastical Commissioners. There was a day school for boys and girls supported by the church incumbent. Population in 1851 was 239 within a parish area of 860 acres (350 hectares) with soil of sandy loam over sandstone and rock. Sir Hungerford Hoskyns, 8th Baronet, was lord of the manor, and chief landowners were the governors of Guy's Hospital, and the gentry occupants of Pencoyd Court and Old Hall. The post office was at Harewoods (Harewood End), with letters sent and received through Ross-on-Wye. Occupations at Pencoyd included five farmers, one of whom was also a miller at Anddis Bridge, a poulterer (poultry farmer), two carpenters of whom one was also a wheelwright, a schoolmistress, and a tailor. Those at Harewood End were shopkeeper & postmaster, licensees of the Plough Inn, and a parish clerk who was also an assistant overseer, and deputy registrar of births and deaths for the St Weonard's district of the Ross Union. At Netherton there were three farmers and a blacksmith.

By 1877-78 the church, in Decorated style, was restored and a new chancel added, at a cost of about £800. The registers dated to 1563. The benefice by 1885 was a vicarage annexed to that of Marstow, in the gift of the vicar of Sellack and King's Caple. The vicar, who lived at Marstow, was a prebendary of Llandaff Cathedral. Parish charities of 10 shillings yearly was provided by land at Sellack. Lady Vincent was lady of the manor, with other major landowners residing outside the parish. Chief crops were wheat, barley, oats, and roots. Parish land area was 879 acres (356 hectares) in which livied an 1881 population of 168. A school board was set up in 1875 for the united district of Pencoyd & Tretire with Michaelchurch. The subsequent Board School for mixed pupils had accommodation for 75, with typical attendance of 44. Pencoyd occupations in 1885 included six farmers, one of whom was a landowner at Old Hall. At Harewood End there was a postmaster and a haulier, and at Netherton, a farmer.

In 1895 ecclesiastical structure remained as previously, but the parish was now listed in the Rural Deanery of Archenfield in the Archdeaconry and Diocese of Hereford. The parish curate was rector of Llandinabo and lived at Harewood End. Parish land area was 890 acres (360 hectares) in which lived an 1891 population of 173. Pencoyd occupations included five farmers, one of whom was also a mason, and another a landowner who lived at Old Hall. At Harewood End was a postmaster, a shopkeeper, and a blacksmith, and at Netherton, two farmers.

== Geography ==
The parish is approximately 2 miles (3 km) from north-east to south-west; being 1 mile (1.6 km) wide at the north-east and 0.5 miles (0.8 km) wide at the south-west. It borders on the parishes of Llanwarne at the north-west, St Weonards at the south-west, Tretire with Michaelchurch at the south, Hentland at the south-east and Harewood at the north-east.

The Gamber (stream), which eventually becomes a tributary to the River Wye, 4 miles (6 km) to the south-east, flows through the south-west of the parish, where it is joined by a stream, running north-east to south-west through the centre of the parish, which is dammed to form six ponds.

The parish is connected by bus at Harewood End to Hereford, Ross-on-Wye, and Gloucester

== Landmarks ==
The Church of St Dennis is a Grade II* listed parish church dating to the 14th century and restored in 1877–78. It is built of sandstone and comprises a nave with a beam-trussed roof, possibly 16th century, a chancel with barrel-vaulted roof, a three-stage tower with three bells, and a timber-framed north porch. Within the church is a 13th-century ledger stone and a 13th-century font. There are a further seven listed buildings and structures, all Grade II. At the south of St Dennis' is a medieval churchyard cross. Also at the south of the church is Pencoyd Court, a two-storey house dating possibly to the 17th century, and of sandstone, part stuccoed, with mid-19th-century bay windows and slate roof. To the north-east from Pencoyd Court is a sandstone dovecote, possibly early 19th century, with a slate pyramidal roof. The Old Manor house to the north-east from the church, is a probable 17th-century house with mid-20th-century restoration, of 'H-plan', constructed as two-storeys with attic in sandstone with tiled roof. At Netherton is the 'E-plan' two-storey Netherton Farmhouse, possibly dating to the 16th century, of sandstone, and with timber-framing with pargeting infills. To the east from the farmhouse is a stable, datestone dated 1761. It is of sandstone, and of three bays and two levels with a corrugated iron roof. The stable is of "value as a rare local dated example". At the north of the parish, on the A49 road, is Harewood Park Lodge, an early to mid-19th-century house, previously a lodge to the 1952-demolished Harewood Park. It is of sandstone ashlar, of one storey, and with a slate roof.
