= Parquet =

Ornate wooden floor design

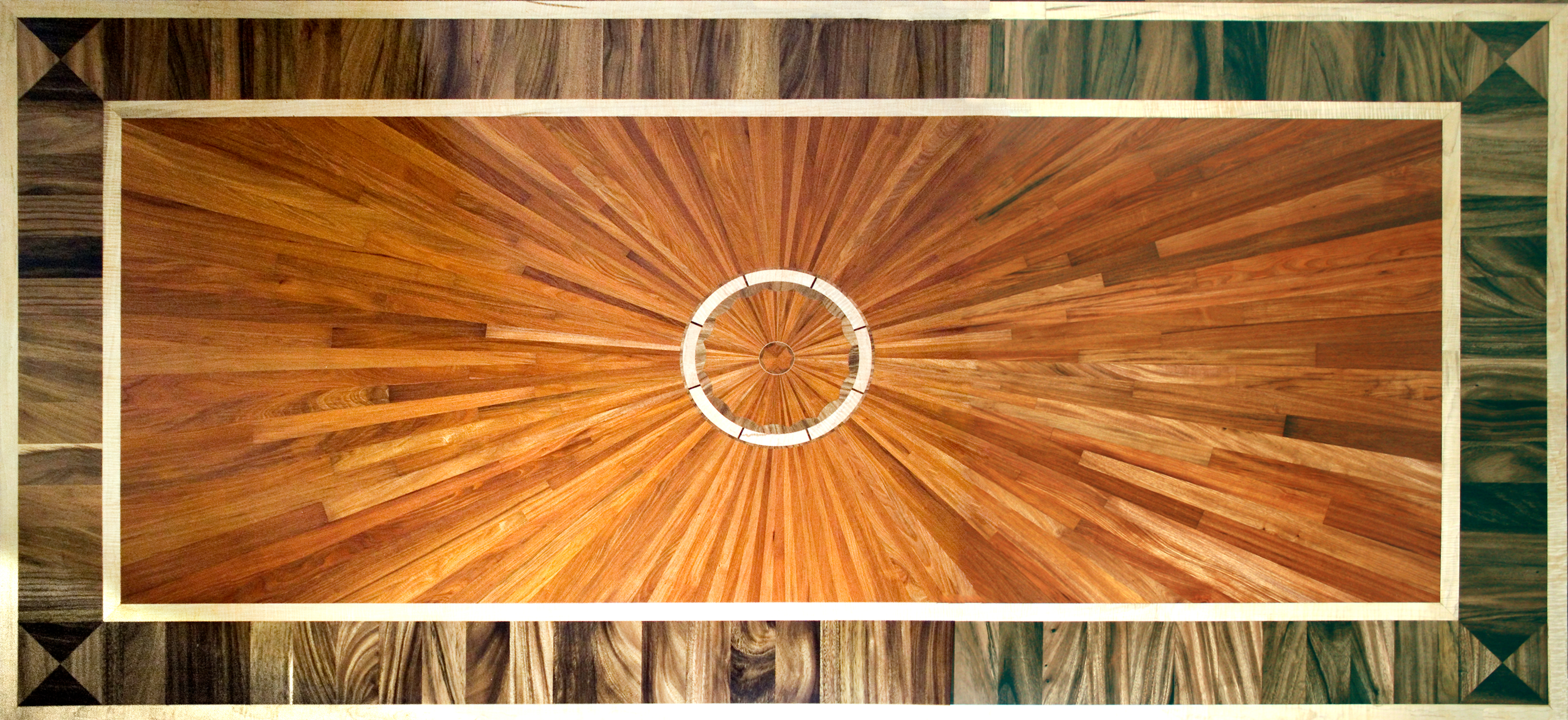
Intricate parquet flooring in entry hall

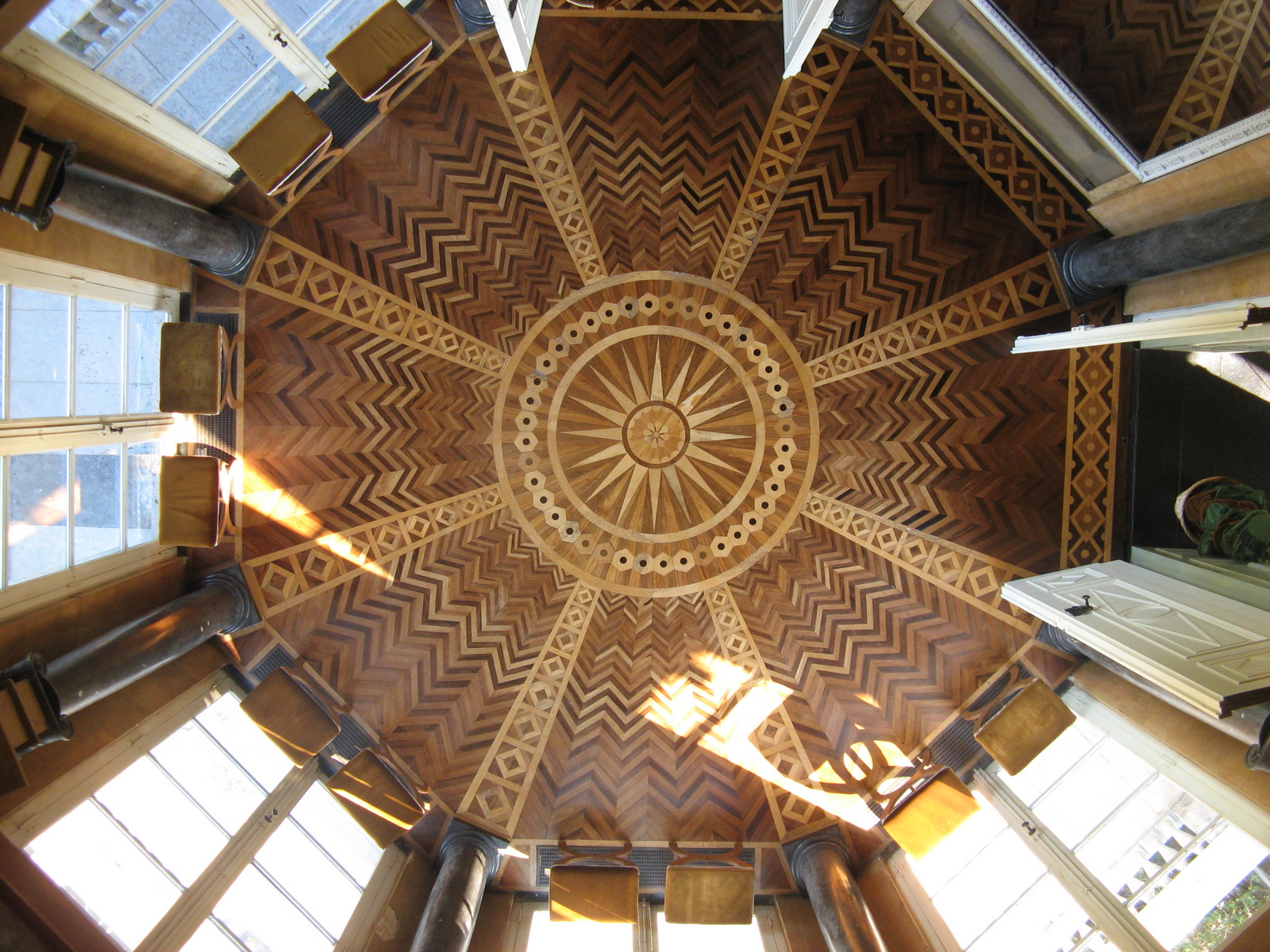
Parquet flooring, 18th century

Parquet (French: [paʁkɛ]; French for "a small compartment") is a geometric mosaic of wood pieces used for decorative effect in flooring.

Parquet patterns are often entirely geometrical and angular—squares, triangles, lozenges—but may contain curves. The most popular parquet flooring pattern is herringbone.

== Etymology ==
The word derives from the Old French parchet (the diminutive of parc), literally meaning "a small enclosed space".

== History ==
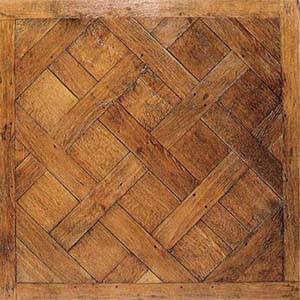
Parquet Versailles

Large diagonal squares known as parquet de Versailles were introduced in 1684 as parquet de menuiserie ("woodwork parquet") to replace the marble flooring that required constant washing, which tended to rot the joists beneath the floors. Such parquets en losange were noted by the Swedish architect Daniel Cronström at Versailles and at the Grand Trianon in 1693.

== Materials ==
Woods contrasting in color and grain, such as oak, walnut, cherry, lime, pine, maple etc. are sometimes employed, and in the more expensive kinds the richly coloured mahogany and sometimes other tropical hardwoods are also used. While not technically a wood, bamboo is also a popular material for modern floors.

Parquet floors were formerly usually adhered with hot bitumen. Today modern cold adhesives are usually used.

== Repair ==
Parquet floors are usually long lasting if maintained correctly. Unstuck blocks are re-glued. Bitumen-glued blocks require use of either hot bitumen, cold bitumen emulsion, or a spirit based parquet adhesive.

== Domestic use ==
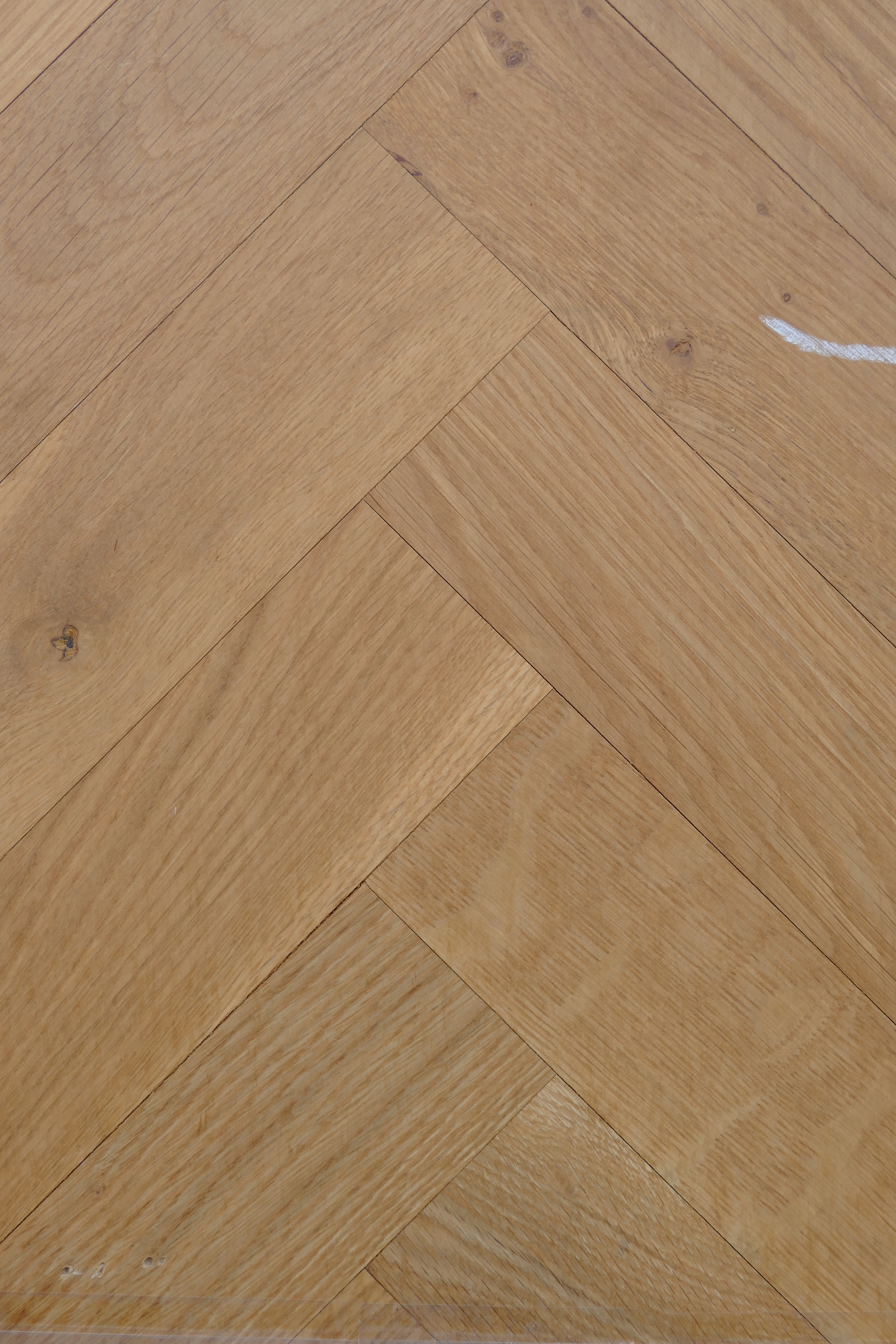
Herringbone parquet is often used in larger rooms or hallways

Parquet floors are often found in bedrooms and hallways. They are considered better than regular floor tiles since they feel warmer underfoot. However they do little to absorb sounds such as walking, vacuum cleaning and television, which can cause problems in multi-occupancy dwellings.

== Basketball courts ==
One of the most famous parquet floors is that used by the Boston Celtics of the NBA. The original floor, which was installed at the Celtics' original home of Boston Arena in 1946, was moved intact to Boston Garden in 1952 and used there until the team moved to what was then known as FleetCenter in 1995, now known as TD Garden. The floor remained intact and in use until it was cut up and sold as souvenirs in 1999, after the 1998 demolition of Boston Garden. The Celtics today play on a parquet floor inside TD Garden that combines old and new sections. In 2018, the Celtics constructed a new parquet floor for use in their new Auerbach Center practice facility. It is the only NBA court floor made from red oak; all others are made from rock maple. In 2023, the Celtics played on a traditional maple court at home for the first time during the 2023 NBA in-season tournament. The Celtics petitioned the NBA to include the parquet pattern on its in-season tournament court, but were denied. In the 2024 NBA Cup, however, the Celtics' parquet pattern was included on their tournament court design.

Similar square-paneled parquet floors, albeit in maple, were made for the Orlando Magic, Minnesota Timberwolves, Denver Nuggets, and New Jersey Nets. Of the four, only the Magic continue to use a square-paneled parquet floor, which was first used at the Orlando Arena in 1989 and later moved to Amway Center (now Kia Center) in 2010. The Nets debuted their parquet at the Meadowlands Arena in 1988, and continued to use the floor until 1997; the floor remained in use with the Seton Hall basketball team until 2007. The Nuggets used a parquet floor from 1990 to 1993 at the McNichols Sports Arena, while the Timberwolves played on a parquet floor from 1996 to 2008 at the Target Center. The Timberwolves brought back the parquet floor for select games in the 2025–26 season while wearing the black throwback uniforms.

In 1995, the Toronto Raptors debuted with a herringbone parquet, and used the floor until 1999 while playing in three different home venues: SkyDome (now Rogers Centre), Copps Coliseum (now TD Coliseum) and Maple Leaf Gardens. The now-Brooklyn Nets introduced chevron parquet flooring upon moving to the Barclays Center in 2012. However, its sister WNBA team (since 2019), the New York Liberty, continues to use a traditional floor at the venue. In 2025, the Golden State Valkyries debuted a vertical herringbone floor at Chase Center; its NBA counterpart, the Golden State Warriors, still uses a traditional court.

While the Charlotte Hornets unveiled a parquet-like floor at the Time Warner Cable Arena for the 2014–15 season, it is not considered a true parquet floor. Instead, it simulated the pattern of the parquet by alternately painting light and dark trapezoid sections through the use of varnish, forming a beehive pattern that is synonymous with the franchise. In 2021, the Hornets changed its court design, relegating the trapezoids to midcourt.

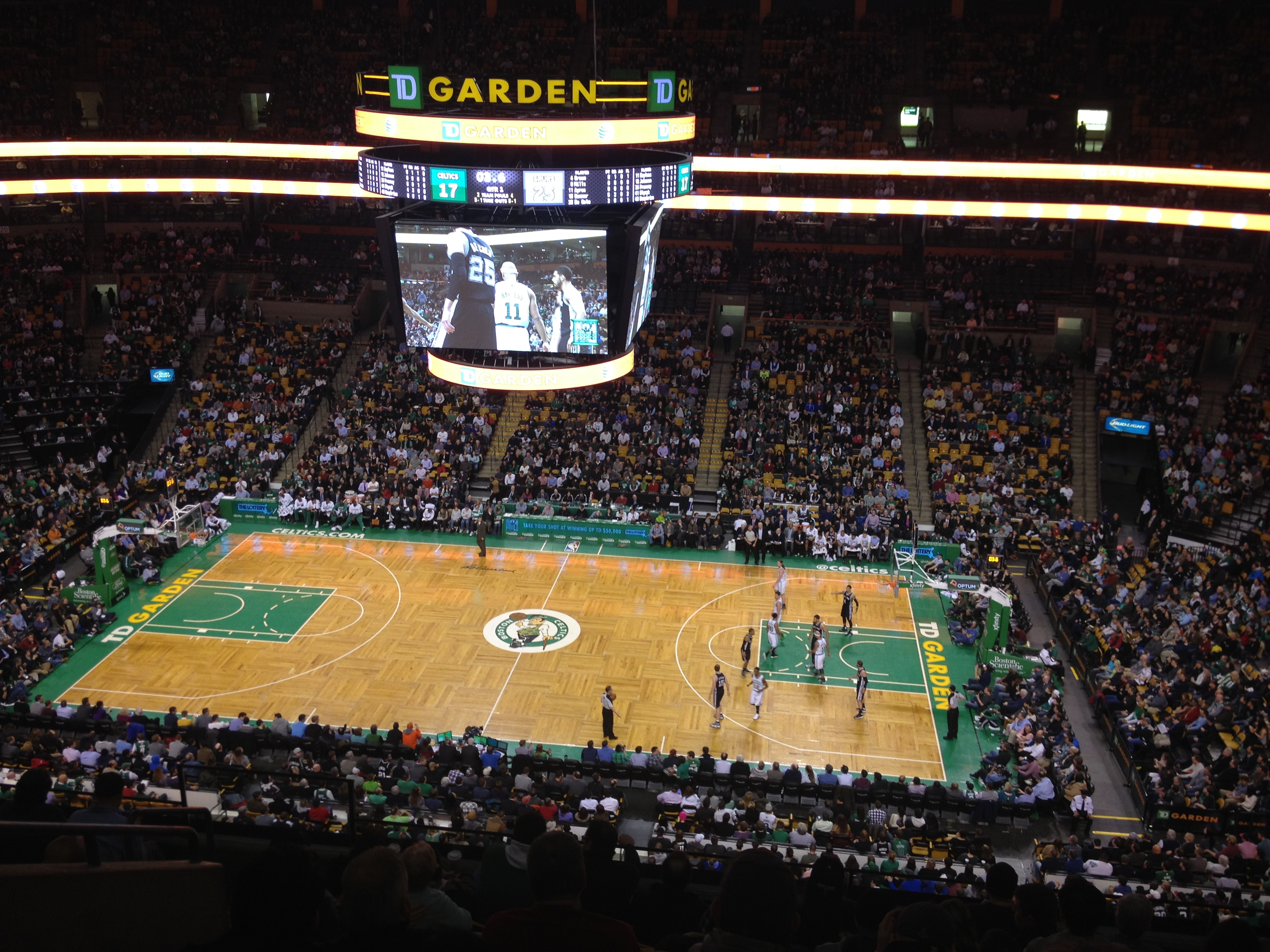
The Boston Celtics' trademark oak parquet floor at TD Garden

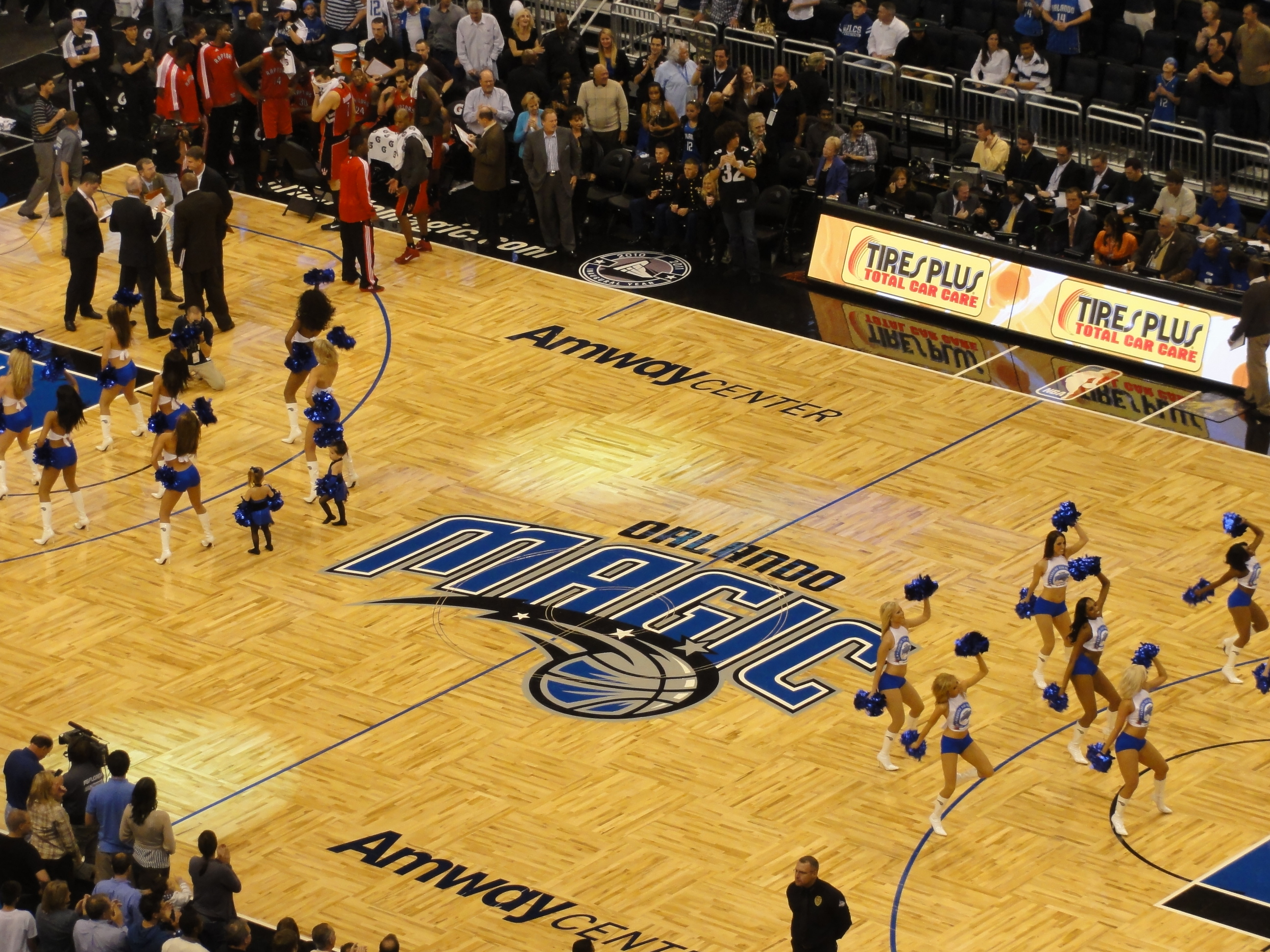
The Orlando Magic's maple parquet floor at Kia Center

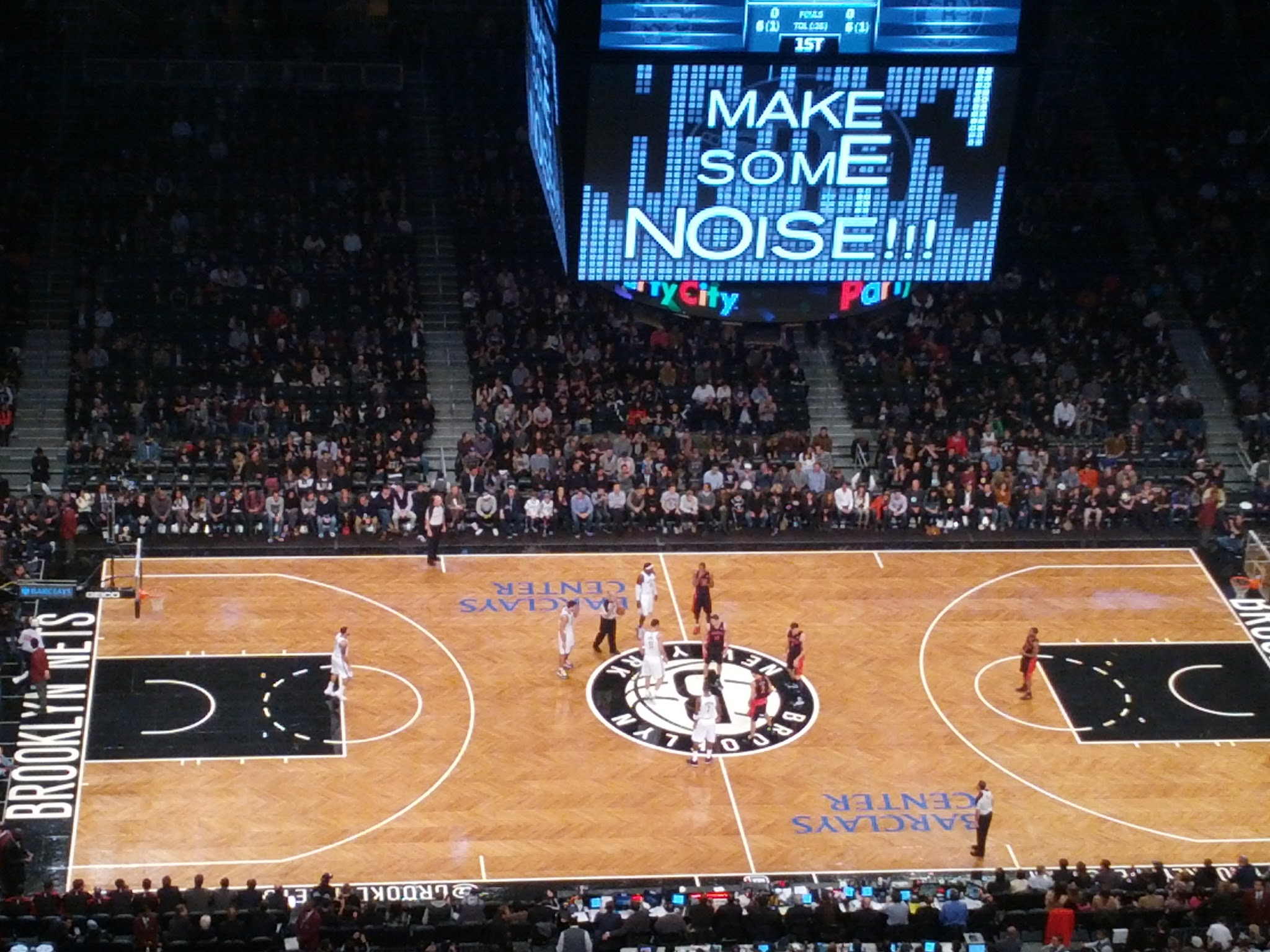
The Brooklyn Nets' maple chevron parquet floor at Barclays Center

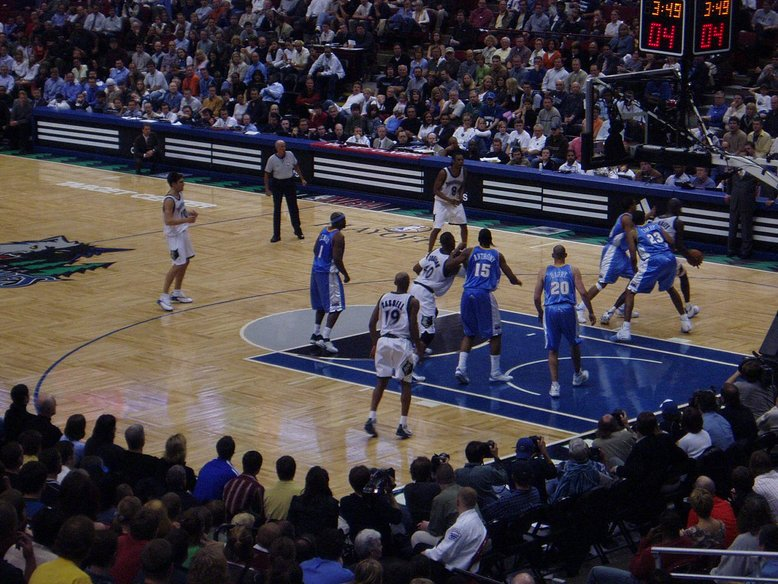
The Minnesota Timberwolves' maple parquet floor at Target Center, used from 1996 to 2008

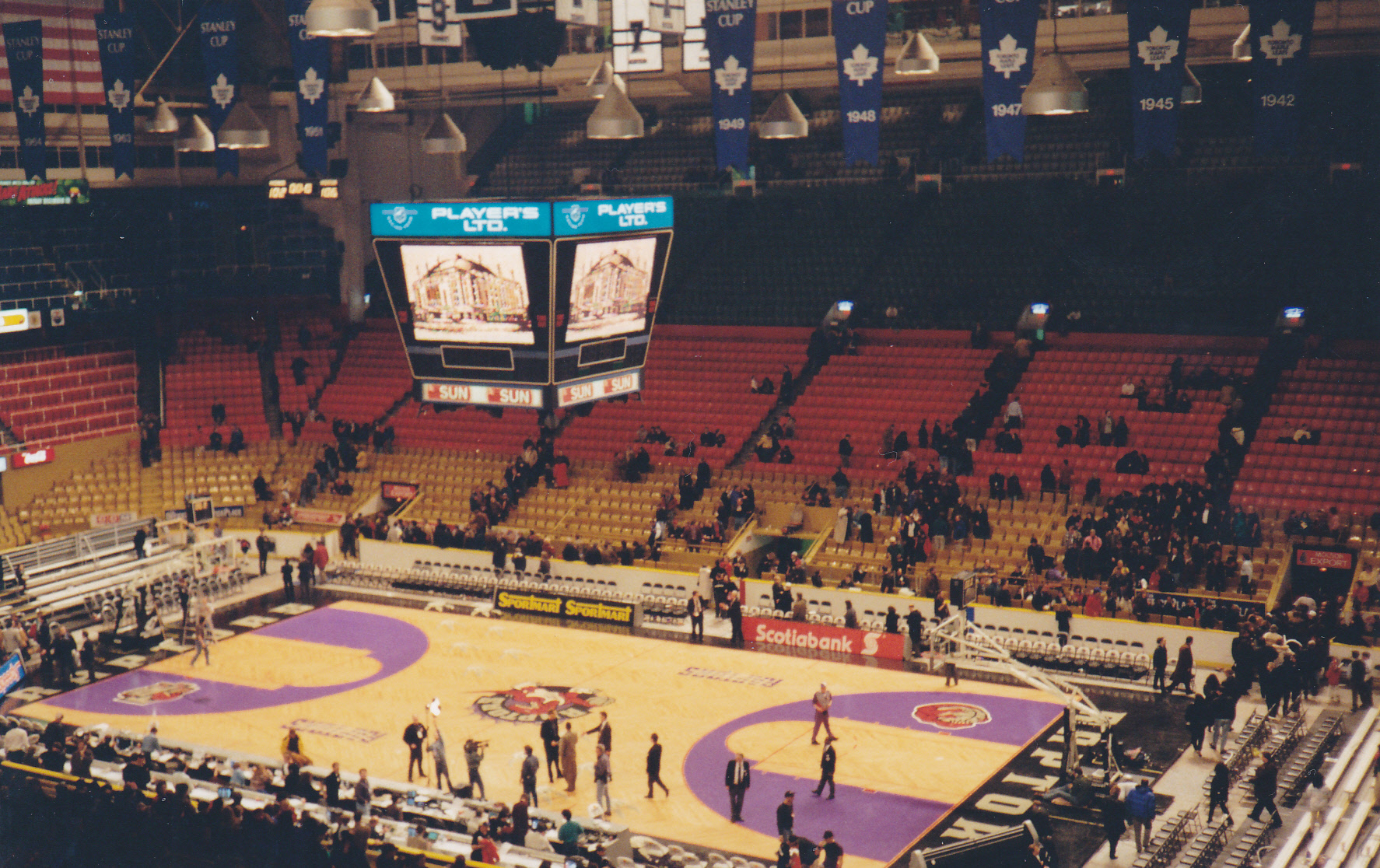
The Toronto Raptors' 1995 to 1999 maple herringbone parquet floor at Maple Leaf Gardens, also used at the Skydome and Copps Coliseum

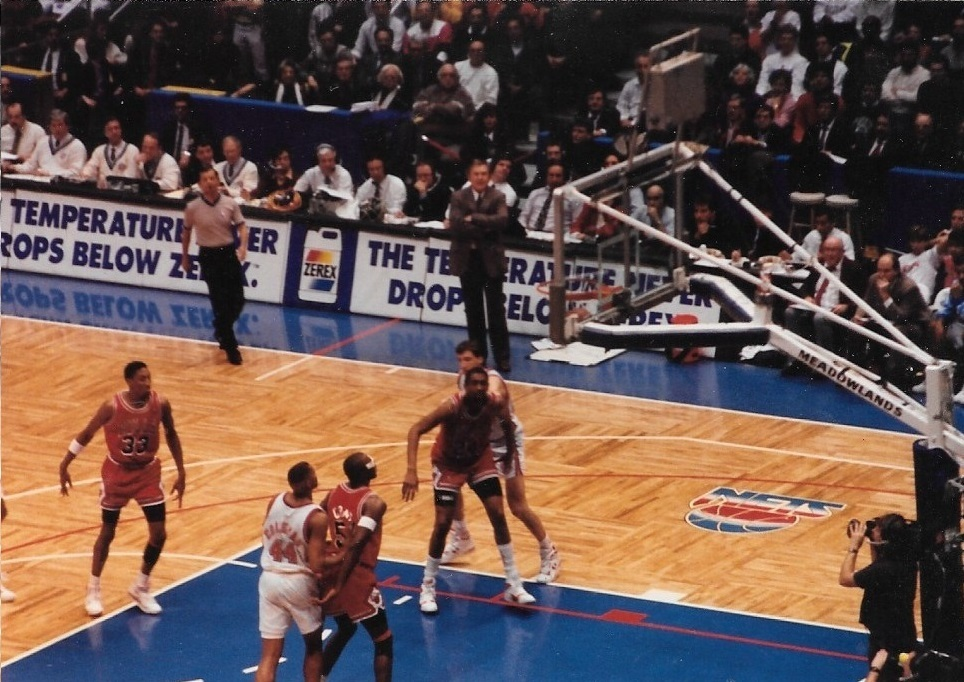
The New Jersey Nets' maple parquet floor at Meadowlands Arena, used from 1988 to 1997

There are a handful of basketball courts in NCAA college basketball that have consistently featured parquet floors. Wake Forest University's Lawrence Joel Veterans Memorial Coliseum has generally featured a parquet floor since its opening in 1989. The University of Iowa's Carver-Hawkeye Arena has generally featured a parquet floor since its opening in 1983.

== See also ==
- Wood flooring
- Marquetry
- Hardwood
- Harewood
- Tessellation
- Tunbridge ware
