= John Hosking =

John Hosking may refer to:

- John Hosking (judge) (1854–1928), New Zealand judge
- John Hosking (politician) (1805–1882), politician and merchant in colonial Australia

== See also ==
- John Hoskin (1921–1990), British sculptor
- John Hoskins (disambiguation)
