= Tretire with Michaelchurch =

Civil parish in Herefordshire, England

Coordinates: 51.9185°N 2.7069°W

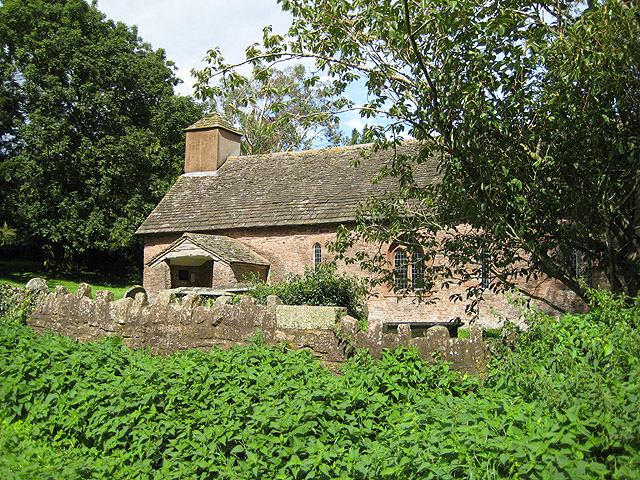
- St Michael's Church, Michaelchurch

- Location within Herefordshire
- Population: 87 (2021 census)
- OS grid reference: SO514246
  - London: 115 mi (185 km) ESE
- Civil parish: Tretire with Michaelchurch
- Unitary authority: Herefordshire
- Ceremonial county: Herefordshire
- Region: West Midlands
- Country: England
- Sovereign state: United Kingdom
- Post town: Hereford
- Postcode district: HR2
- Dialling code: 01981
- Police: West Mercia
- Fire: Hereford and Worcester
- Ambulance: West Midlands
- UK Parliament: Hereford and South Herefordshire

Tretire with Michaelchurch is a civil parish in Herefordshire, England. It is approximately 9 miles (14 km) south from the city and county town of Hereford and 5 miles (8 km) west from the market town of Ross-on-Wye. The parish, entirely rural, incorporates the hamlet settlements of Tretire and Michaelchurch. In 2021 the parish had a population of 87.

== History ==
Tretire, called 'Rythir' in 1212, means 'Long ford' from the Welsh "rhyd with hir". Michelchurch was called 'Lann mihacgel' in 1150, the "llan" meaning 'church'.

In the middle to late 19th century 'Tretire and Michaelchurch' was a parish in the Wormelow Hundred and the Ross district of Herefordshire, with Ross-on-Wye as its post town. It was in the Ross Union—poor relief provision set up under the Poor Law Amendment Act 1834—and the Ross county court division and Harewood's End petty sessional division. The manor belonged to Sir Hungerford Hoskyns, 7th Baronet (1776 - 1862). Parish area was 1,356 acres (549 hectares) of sand and loam over rock, on which were grown chiefly barley and turnips, and in which was an 1851 population of 147 and 31 houses. In the mid-1850s those directory listed as living in Tretire, apart from the two clergymen, were three farmers and a miller. At Michaelchurch were two farmers and the parish clerk.

The parish church (St Mary's) at Tretire was rebuilt in 1856-57 at a cost of £750, its churchyard containing "several tombs of great antiquity, and also a very ancient sun-dial". It is of "mixed styles", and comprises a chancel, nave, south porch, and a western turret containing three bells. The parish registers date to 1719. The ecclesiastical parish living was a rectory in the Archdeaconry and Diocese of Hereford and the Rural Deanery of Archenfield; it was worth £182 yearly, and came with tithe rents, a residence, and 5 acres (2.0 hectares) of glebe, an area of land used to support a parish priest. The rector was supported by a curate, who in turn supported a parish free school. St Michael's Church, in the township of Michaelchurch to the north, which comprises a nave, porch, a belfry with two bells, and a Roman altar, was a chapelry of Tretire, and part of the Tretire living.

In 1871 population was 164, increasing to 173 in 1881. By 1885 the lady of the manor was Lady Vincent, while Tretire occupations included a farmer, a water miller, and a blacksmith & grocer who also ran the post office, and at Michaelchurch, two farmers and a shopkeeper. A mission hall had been established at Michaelchurch in 1884. By 1890 there were 34 family-inhabited houses. One of the four principal landowners were the governors of Guy's Hospital. The parish was within the Pencoyd and Tretire with Michaelchurch school board district, with its children attending a board school in Pencoyd. Near St Mary's, Tretire, were reported the "remains of an old castle". Between Michaelchurch and Pengethley [within Hentland to the east] was noted "an ancient square camp called 'Geer Cop'". Occupations in 1990 in Tretire with Michaelchurch included four farmers, one of whom was also a shopkeeper, a carpenter & wheelwright, a miller, a postmaster, an assistant overseer, and carriers—transporter of trade goods, with sometimes people, between different settlements—two to Ross-on-Wye and one to Hereford. The population in 1891 was 123. The lordship of the manor was then in the hands of a member of the gentry. The 1911 population was 151, and Kelly's recorded that St Michael's in Michaelchurch was founded in 1056 by Bishop Herewald of Llandaff, and contained an early Norman font, and church registers dating to 1586.

== Geography ==
The parish is approximately 2.5 miles (4 km) from north-west to south-east; being 1.5 miles (2.4 km) wide at the north-west and 1 mile (1.6 km) wide at the south-east, and is rural: of farms fields and woods, dispersed properties, and the eastern hamlet settlements of Tretire and Michaelchurch. The Gamber (stream), which eventually becomes a tributary to the River Wye, flows through the west and the southern part of the parish. The B4521 road, from the A49 Hereford to Ross-on-Wye road to the north-east, to the A466 Hereford to Monmouth road to the south-west, runs through the settlement of Tretire at the south-east of the parish. All other routes are minor roads and country lanes. Bordering parishes are Pencoyd at the north, Llangarron at the south, Hentland at the east, and St Weonards at the west.

The parish, containing two churches but devoid of amenities, is represented by one councillor on the Llanwarne & District Group Parish Council.

== Landmarks ==
There are 19 Grade II listed buildings, structures and monuments in Tretire with Michaelchurch.

St Michael's Church at Michaelchurch (today redundant), of sandstone rubble with stone slate roofs, dates to the late 11th or early 12th century with later internal alterations and additions, and comprises a chancel, nave and south porch. Within the nave is a Roman altar and a 12th-century font. Its sister church of St Mary, at Tretire, rebuilt in 1856 in early Decorated style, is of sandstone rubble with tiled roofs, and comprises a chancel, nave, south porch, vestry, and a bell turret. It was built on the site of a previous medieval church and inside incorporates 13th- to 18th-century artifacts.

On the B4521 road in the south-west of Tretire are the remains of a former water-powered corn mill, which was converted to a residence in 1968. In the west of Tretire is the former church rectory, of two storeys, dating to the 16th century, and rebuilt in the 17th.
