= Eowyn (disambiguation) =

Eowyn may refer to:

- Éowyn, a character from The Lord of the Rings
- Éowyn (musician) (born 1979), American Christian alternative rock artist
- Eowyn Ivey (born 1973), American author
- Storm Éowyn, a storm of the 2024–25 European windstorm season affecting Ireland, the Isle of Man, the United Kingdom and Norway

== See also ==
- Edwyn
- Eoin
- Owain
