= Marstow =

Hamlet in Herefordshire, England

Coordinates: 51.869°N 2.65062°W

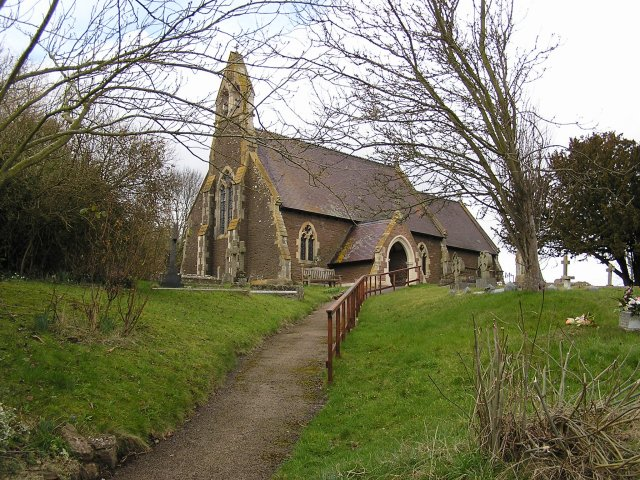
- St Matthew's Church, Marstow

- Location within Herefordshire
- OS grid reference: SO553192
  - London: 112 mi (180 km) ESE
- Civil parish: Marstow
- Unitary authority: Herefordshire
- Ceremonial county: Herefordshire
- Region: West Midlands
- Country: England
- Sovereign state: United Kingdom
- Post town: ROSS-ON-WYE
- Postcode district: HR9
- Dialling code: 01600
- Police: West Mercia
- Fire: Hereford and Worcester
- Ambulance: West Midlands
- UK Parliament: Hereford and South Herefordshire

Marstow is a hamlet and civil parish in south eastern Herefordshire, England. Most of the parish is within the Wye Valley Area of Outstanding Natural Beauty.

== History ==
Marstow at c.1130 was written as "Lann Martin", and in 1291 as "Martinstow". The name derives from the saint's name [Martin], with the Old English 'stōw' "replacing [the] Welsh "Llan in the early form", and producing the "Church or holy place of St Martin".

In 1831 the parish was a division of the Wormelow Hundred of Hereford, with a population of 132. The then St Martin's ecclesiastical parish living was a perpetual curracy annexed to the vicarage of Sellack (5 miles (8 km) to the north). The vicar at Sellack held a royal bounty endowment of £400 with which to support the incumbency of Marstow.

In 1868 the nearest railway station was at Ross-on-Wye, which was also Marstow's post town. The parish was described as small, on the Garron Brook tributary of the River Wye, and included the hamlet of Pencraig. The Ross to Monmouth road ran through the parish. The land was of "sand and loam upon a subsoil of red sandstone and rock". Parish tithes - typically one-tenth of the produce or profits of the land given to the rector for his services - had been commuted and substituted with a £202 10s yearly rent-charge payment [under the 1836 Tithe Commutation Act]. The vicar at Sellack still held the church patronage, to the value of £269, which then included the annexed perpetual curacy of Pencoyd [St Denys] (6 miles (10 km) to the north-east of Marstow). The church of St Martin [demolished in 1855] is described as "an ancient stone structure, with a small tower containing two bells", whose "churchyard is frequently inundated by the overflowing of the river". The subsequent St Matthew's Church at Brelston Green, built in the same year, cost £750. There was a school in Marstow for children of both sexes. John Marius Wilson in 1870 adds parish land area as 809 acres (327 hectares) with a population of 142 within 27 dwellings. The rateable value of the land was £2,052.

Between 1885 and 1890 the parish remained in the same hundred and deaconry as previously, was in the manor of Wilton-on-Wye, the Ross county court district, the Harewood End petty sessional division and the Whitchurch polling district and electoral division of the county council. The nearest railway station was at Kerne Bridge, 6 miles (10 km) east on the Ross and Monmouth branch of the Great Western Railway. The patronage of the church living was now in the joint gift of Sellack and King's Caple (6 miles (10 km) to the north), and still annexed to Pencoyd. The living didn't include a priest's residence. The new church, now St Matthew, was in the hamlet of Brelston Green, its register dating to 1701. Further notable buildings recorded were Fairfield House, Pengraig Court, Glewstone Court, Trbandy House, and Mount Craig. One of the three principal landowners was Lord Tredegar. There was a Primitive Methodist meeting house, and a Congregationalist chapel with 80 sittings that was erected in 1872 at Pencraig.

The rateable value of the now 1,910 acres (770 hectares) of land was £3,505, on which were grown chiefly wheat, barley, root crops and vegetables, and some pasture, with an 1871 parish population of 161 and 1881 of 143. In 1890 there were 29 inhabited houses with 33 families or separate occupiers, and a land area of 1,935 acres (783 hectares) with an annual rateable value of £3,046. After the Divided Parishes Act, on 25 March 1884 the hamlets of Brelston Green, Pengraig and Glewstone had been alienated from their former neighbouring parishes; further land was at the time alienated at from Bridstow and Peterstow. After the redrawing of boundaries Marston population rose to 383. There were two post offices, one each at Glewstone and Pencraig. A district school was built at Glewstone in 1873 for £400, with a residence for a schoolmistress, and which accommodated 60 children and had an average attendance on 45; the school also provided for the outlying portions of the parishes of Goodrich, Peterstow, Bridstow and Hentland.

Occupation listings for the period living in the parish included a farm bailiff, a water miller at Tuck mill, a schoolmistress, and a grocer & beer retailer who was also a sub-postmaster. A shopkeeper, carpenter, gardener, and blacksmith traded at Glewstone, and a further blacksmith at Brelston Green who in 1890 was also an assistant overseer. In 1885 there were fifteen farmers, with one each at Brelston Green and Glewstone, and two at Pencraig. By 1890 farmers increased to seventeen.

In 1913 the administrative, religious, geographical, and historical aspects of the parish remained as before. There was listed an extra 40 acres (16 hectares) of glebe, an area of land used to support the parish priest. Land rateable value of £2,763, and an expanse of 22 acres (8.9 hectares) of water was recorded. Population in 1911 was 341 for the civil parish, and 120 for the ecclesiastical. The school at Glewstone was now a Public Elementary School for mixed pupils and infants. Occupations included ten farmers, one of whom worked at Brelston Green, a poultry farmer at Tuck mill. At Glewstone was a carpenter, and a shopkeeper, and at Pengraig a carpenter & beer retailer, a blacksmith, and a farmer.

Between 1974 and 1998 Marstow was in the South Herefordshire district of Hereford and Worcester.

== Geography ==
The hamlet of Marstow is 14 miles (23 km) south from the city and county town of Hereford, and 4 miles (6 km) south-west from the market town of Ross-on-Wye, the nearest large town. The Welsh border of Monmouthshire is 3 miles (5 km) to the south-west.

The A1437 road, running locally from the A40 at the village of Whitchurch to the A49 from Ross-on-Wye to Hereford, runs north to south through the parish at the west, and forms the north-western part of the parish boundary. The A40 runs for 1.5 miles (2 km) through the parish at the east.

The parish is rural, of farms, fields, woods, streams and dispersed buildings, and includes the other hamlets of Glewstone, Brelston Green and Pencraig. It is approximately 3 miles north to south, and about 1 mile (1.6 km) east to west at its widest. The stream of Luke Brook runs north to south through the centre of the parish, joining Garren Brook which feeds the River Wye at the south. Both watercourses form part of the parish' southern border. Parishes bordering Marstow are Peterstow at the north, Bridstow and Walford at the east, Goodrich at the south-east, Whitchurch at the south, and Llangarron at the west. The River Wye forms the boundary with the parish of Walford. The parish east of the A1437 is part of the Wye Valley Area of Outstanding Natural Beauty.

The parish is connected to Whitchurch, Ross-on-Wye, Bridstow, and Monmouth by buses running east to west through Glewstone.

== Landmarks ==
Marstow parish contains 32 listed buildings and structures.

The Grade II parish church of St Matthew is in the hamlet of Brelston Green. It was built in 1855 from sandstone rubble with limestone to designs by Thomas Nicholson, and comprises a chancel, nave, vestry room, south porch, and a bell-cot. Within the church is a Mason & Hamlin late 19th-century harmonium. The chancel east window contains stained glass depicting the Raising of Jairus' daughter. The church is in the deanery of Ross & Archenfield of the Diocese of Hereford. In 2017 St Matthew's was put on the Heritage at Risk register of Historic England, and in 2018 received "£105,000 for vital structural repairs", and the addition of a community space, from the Heritage Lottery Fund.

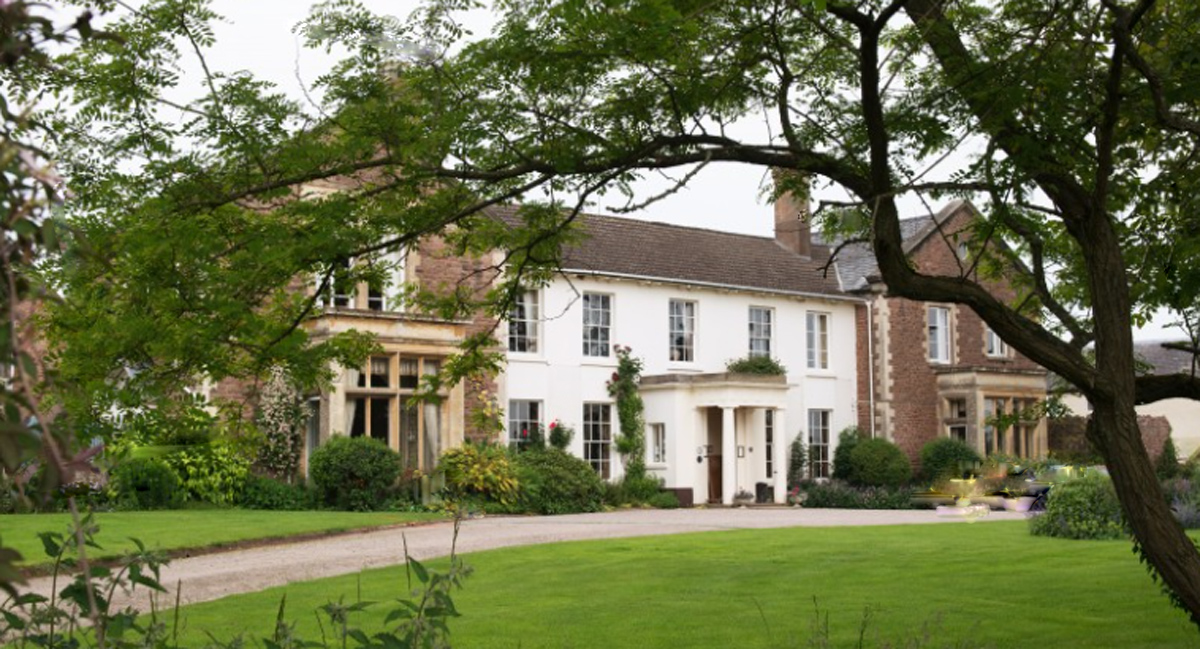
Glewstone Court

Marstow Court, in Marstow village, is a Grade II largely late 18th- to early 19th-century T-plan brick farmhouse, dating to the 17th century. The only Grade II* building in Marstow is a two-storey sandstone outbuilding to the east of Marstow Court. Possibly previously a house, it dates to the 15th century, was altered in the 18th, and is of rectangular plan. The Grade II L-plan sandstone New Court farmhouse, north-east from the village, dates to the 17th century. Brelston Court, to the south-east from St Matthew's Church at Brelston Green, is a Grade II sandstone house, dating to the mid-18th-century. The Grade II Glewstone Court, at the north-east of Glewstone, is late 18th-century rectangular plan house, with late 19th-century additions and cross wings, of sandstone and limestone with ground floor bay windows and a central porch with Tuscan columns. The Pencraig Court Hotel, at Pencraig and Grade II, is a conversion of an 18th-century house. The rectangular house was redesigned in 1840, and is of two storeys and stuccoed brick, and has a service wing, and a central porch with fluted columns with Ionic capitals. Ashe Farmhouse, south-east from Glewstone, is a Grade II L-plan brick and sandstone two-storey house with a datestone indicating a 1740 build.
