= St Michael's Church, Tretire with Michaelchurch =

Coordinates: 51.926056°N 2.697278°W

St Michael's Church, Michaelchurch
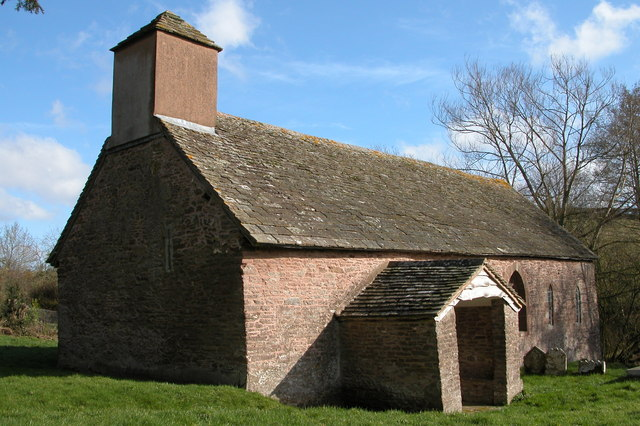
- St Michael's Church, Michaelchurch, from the south-west

- Location in Herefordshire
- OS grid reference: SO 521 255
- Location: Michaelchurch, Herefordshire
- Country: England
- Denomination: Anglican
- Website: Churches Conservation Trust

History
- Founded: 1056 (?)
- Founder(s): Herwald, Bishop of Llandaff (?)
- Dedication: Saint Michael

Architecture
- Functional status: Redundant
- Heritage designation: Grade II
- Designated: 30 April 1986
- Architectural type: Church
- Style: Norman

Specifications
- Materials: Sandstone, stone slate roofs

St Michael's Church is a redundant Anglican church in the hamlet of Michaelchurch in the parish of Tretire with Michaelchurch, Herefordshire, England. It is recorded in the National Heritage List for England as a designated Grade II listed building, and is under the care of the Churches Conservation Trust. It is in an isolated position in a field some 5 miles (8 km) to the west of Ross-on-Wye. The church is notable for its 13th-century wall paintings, and the presence of a reconstructed Roman altar.

== History ==
It is said that the church was founded by Herwald, Bishop of Llandaff in 1056. Alterations were made to it in the 13th and 17th centuries, and the church was restored in the late 19th or early 20th century. In 1830, Rev John Webb, the rector, discovered outside a cottage a rectangular stone with a depression on its top that was being used as a mortar. He realised that it was a Roman altar stone, and then found the stem and the base of the altar in the blocked north doorway of the church. The pieces were moved to the church at Tretire, a nearby village, but were returned to Michaelchurch in 1908. The church was declared redundant on 28 July 1972, and was vested in the Churches Conservation Trust on 13 November 1973.

== Architecture ==
=== Exterior ===
The church is constructed in sandstone with stone slate roofs. Its plan is simple, consisting of a three bay nave, a two-bay chancel, and a south porch. On the west gable is a bellcote with a pyramidal roof; its walls are rendered. In the north wall of the nave is a blocked doorway now occupied by a 20th-century casement window. In the south wall, to the east of the porch, is a lancet window and a two-light window under a pointed arch. The chancel has two small lancets in the south wall, one similar window in the north wall, and two taller lancets in the east wall. The porch contains stone benches.

=== Interior ===
The ceiling of the church is plastered, and the east and south walls of the chancel have refitted 17th-century panels. Elsewhere, on the north, east and south walls, are 13th-century paintings, mainly in red and white, of geometric patterns and floral decorations. On parts of the north and south walls these have been superimposed by 16th and 17th-century black-lettered inscriptions, including the Ten Commandments. Between the nave and the chancel is a wooden screen with a wide central entry and three bays on each side. The lower parts of the bays are panelled, and the upper parts consist of open arches with pendents. The choir stalls date from the 19th-century, and have carved angels as finials. The stone font dates from the 12th century and has a tapering cylindrical bowl carved with a cross and interlacing decoration. The bowl stands on a cylindrical stem and a circular base. Near the font is a 14th-century coffin lid carved with a cross in a circle. The lectern probably dates from the 19th century. The reconstructed Roman altar stands in the blocked north doorway. It carries a badly worn inscription that can be roughly translated as "To the god of the three ways (crossroads), Beccicus dedicates this altar".

== External features ==
The churchyard contains the war grave of a World War I soldier to the south-east of the church, and that of a Second World War Royal Navy officer to the north of the church.

== See also ==
- List of churches preserved by the Churches Conservation Trust in the English Midlands
