= Gerhard Kittel =

German Protestant theologian (1888-1948)

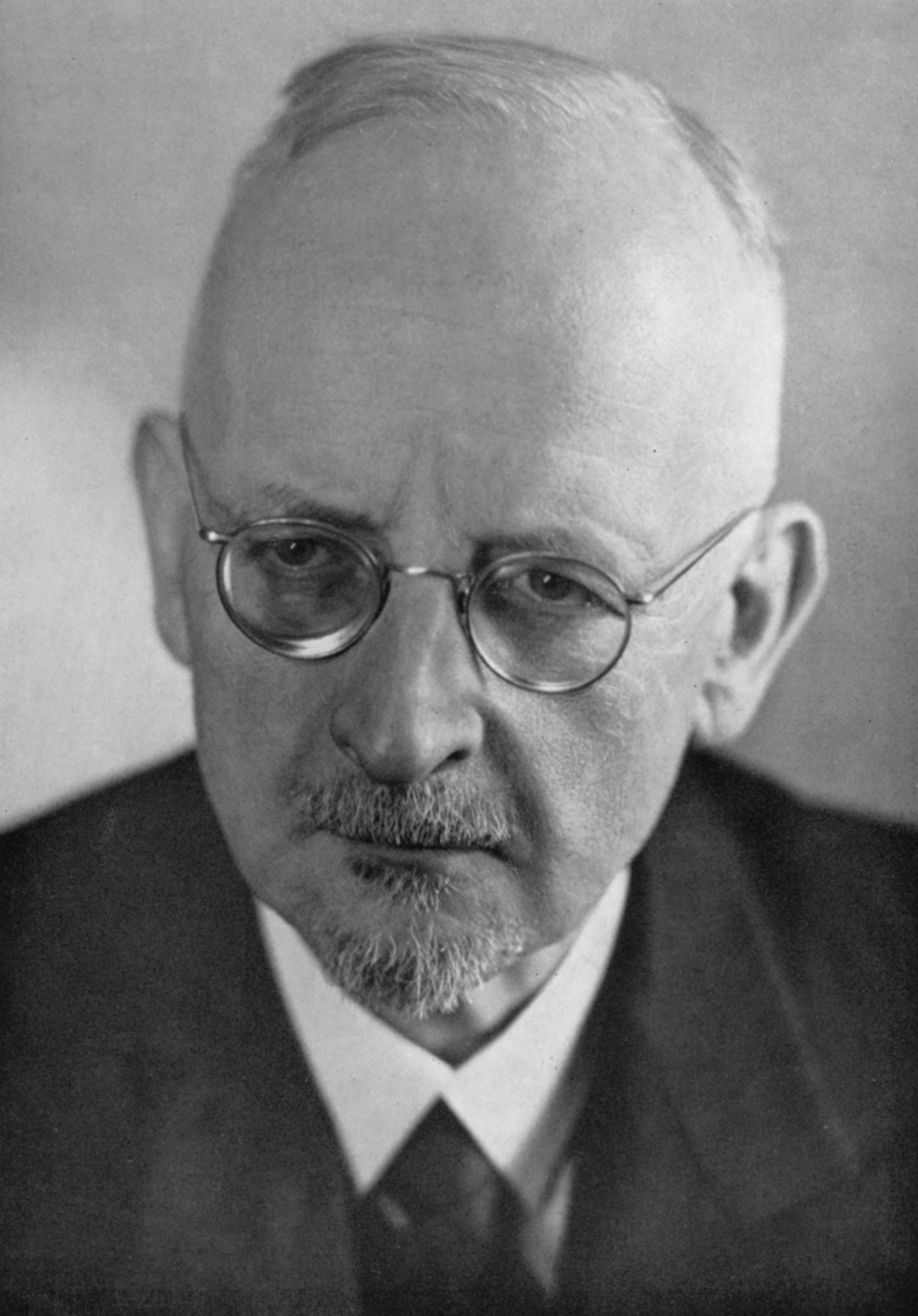
- Born: 23 September 1888; Breslau, Prussia, German Empire
- Died: 11 July 1948 (aged 59); Tübingen, Germany
- Political party: Nazi Party
- Spouse: Hanna Untermeier (m. 1914)
- Parent: Rudolf Kittel

Academic background
- Education: University of Kiel
- Thesis: Die Oden Salomos, überarbeitet oder einheitlich (1912)
- Doctoral advisor: Johannes Leipoldt

Academic work
- Discipline: Biblical studies; theology
- Sub-discipline: New Testament studies
- School or tradition: Lutheranism
- Institutions: University of Tübingen
- Doctoral students: Walter Grundmann
- Influenced: Sir Edwyn Hoskyns; Karl Georg Kuhn

Gerhard Kittel (23 September 1888 – 11 July 1948) was a German Lutheran theologian and lexicographer of biblical languages. He was an enthusiastic supporter of the Nazis and an open antisemite. He is known in the field of biblical studies for his Theological Dictionary of the New Testament.

== Biography ==
Kittel was born on 23 September 1888 in Breslau, Poland. The son of Old Testament scholar Rudolf Kittel, he married Hanna Untermeier in 1914, but there were no children from the union. In May 1933, he joined the Nazi Party. He had had no previous involvement in politics but called the party "a völkisch renewal movement on a Christian, moral foundation".

On 3 May 1945, after Nazi Germany capitulated to the Allies, Kittel was arrested by the French occupying forces. He was subsequently removed from office and interned at Balingen. In his own defence, Kittel maintained his work was "scientific in method" and motivated by Christianity, although it may have appeared antisemitic to some. He attempted to distinguish his work from the "vulgar antisemitism of Nazi propaganda" like Der Stürmer and Alfred Rosenberg, who was known for his anti-Christian rhetoric, völkisch arguments and emphasis on Lebensraum. Kittel characterized his work as an "attempt to grapple with the problem of Jewry and the Jewish question".

Martin Dibelius, a German Protestant theologian at Heidelberg, wrote that Kittel's works related to ancient Judaism "are of purely scientific character" and "do not serve the Party interpretation of Judaism". He said further that Kittel deserved "the thanks of all who are interested in the scientific study of Judaism".

Claus Schedl, who attended Kittel's lectures on the Jewish Question in the winter of 1941–1942 in Vienna, said that "one heard not a single word of malice" and that "Professor Kittel truly did not collaborate". Schedl says that Kittel was one of very few scholars who promoted an opinion on the Jewish Question other than the official one. Kittel himself said his goal was to combat the myths and distortions of extremist members of the Nazi Party.

Annemarie Tugendhat was a Christian Jew whose father had been taken to the concentration camp Welzheim in 1938. She testified that Kittel had strongly objected against the actions being taken against Jews, with his work on the Jewish Question not based on the racial theories of Nazism but upon theology.

In 1946, Kittel was released pending his trial, but was forbidden to enter Tübingen until 1948. From 1946 to 1948 he was a pastor (Seelsorger) in Beuron. In 1948, he was allowed back into Tübingen, but died that year before the criminal proceedings against him could be resumed. He died on 11 July 1948.

=== Nazi Germany ===
A Professor of Evangelical Theology and New Testament at the University of Tübingen, he published studies depicting the Jewish people as the historical enemy of Germany, Christianity, and European culture in general. In a lecture of June 1933 Die Judenfrage (The Jewish Question), that soon appeared in print, he spoke for the stripping of citizenship from German Jews, their removal from medicine, law, teaching, and journalism, and to forbid marriage or sexual relations with non-Jews – thus anticipating by two years the Nazi government, which introduced its Nuremberg Racial Laws and took away Jewish rights of German citizenship in 1935. A close friend of Walter Frank, Kittel joined Frank's Reichsinstitut für Geschichte des neuen Deutschlands, upon its foundation in 1935. Within this institute he was attached to Forschungsabteilung Judenfrage.

From 1940 to 1943 Kittel held an Evangelical Theology chair at the university of Vienna. He was replaced at the university of Tübingen by Otto Michel (1903-1993). In March 1943 Kittel suddenly returned to Tübingen to reclaim his theology chair at its university, while still holding his chair at the university of Vienna. This forced Michel to be drafted into the Wehrmacht as a lowly private and caused him traumatic humiliations. (See Otto Michel, Anpassung oder Widerstand: eine Autobiographie, Wuppertal & Zurich, Brockhaus Verlag, 1989, pp. 88–98).

William F. Albright wrote that, "In view of the terrible viciousness of his attacks on Judaism and the Jews, which continues at least until 1943, Gerhard Kittel must bear the guilt of having contributed more, perhaps, than any other Christian theologian to the mass murder of Jews by Nazis."

== Literary works ==
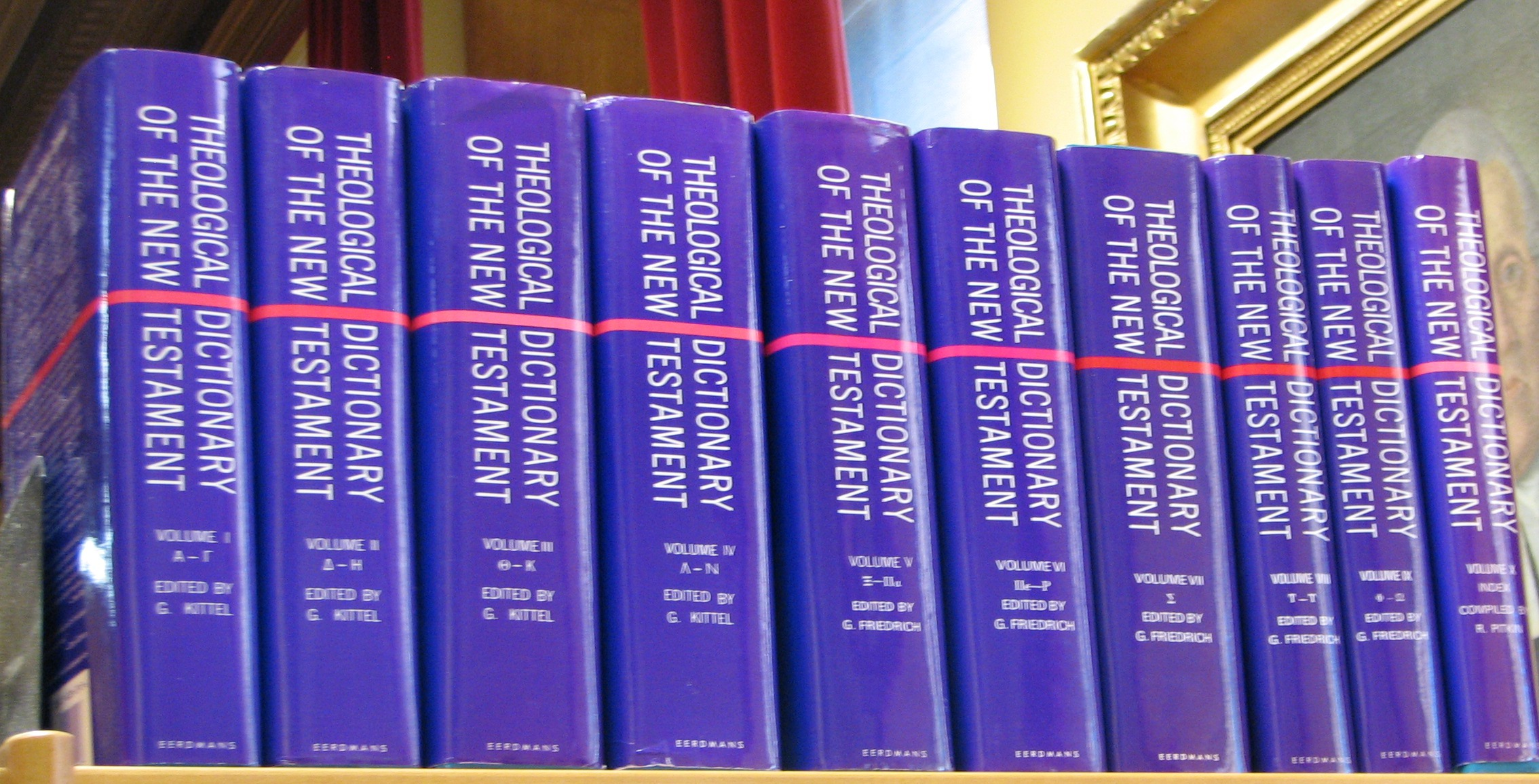
Kittel's magnum opus

- Die Oden Salomos überarbeitet oder einheitlich, 1914
- Jesus und die Rabbinen, 1914
- Die Probleme des palästinensischen Spätjudentums und das Urchristentum, 1926
- Urchristentum, Spätjudentum, Hellenismus, 1926
- Die Religionsgeschichte und das Urchristentum, 1932
- Die Judenfrage (The Jewish Question), 1933 (pamphlet, published in Stuttgart by W. Kohlhammer, from June 1933 lecture)
- Founder and co-editor of the Theologisches Wörterbuch zum Neuen Testament, 10 vols., 1933–1979
- Ein theologischer Briefwechsel mit Karl Barth (A theological correspondence with Karl Barth), 1934 with Karl Barth
- Christus und Imperator, 1939
- Das Antike Weltjudentum – Forschungen zur Judenfrage (World Jewry of Antiquity – Research on the Jewish Question), 1943 with Eugen Fischer

== See also ==
- Walter Grundmann
