= Sir John Hoskyns, 15th Baronet =

English cricketer, soldier, barrister, and clergyman

Personal information
- Full name: John Chevallier Hoskyns
- Born: 23 May 1926; Newnham, Cambridgeshire, England
- Died: 12 April 1956 (aged 29); Powick, Worcestershire, England
- Batting: Left-handed

Domestic team information
- Years: Team
- 1949: Cambridge University

Career statistics
Competition	First-class
Matches	2
Runs scored	63
Batting average	21.00
100s/50s	–/–
Top score	42*
Catches/stumpings	–/–
- Source: Cricinfo, 16 January 2022

Sir John Chevallier Hoskyns, 15th Baronet (23 May 1926 – 12 April 1956) was an English first-class cricketer, British Army officer, barrister, and clergyman.

The son of Sir Edwyn Hoskyns, he was born in May 1926 at Newnham, Cambridgeshire. He was educated at Marlborough College. Upon the death of his brother in April 1945, he succeeded him as the 15th Baronet of the Hoskyns baronets. He finished his education at Marlborough during the Second World War and was commissioned into the King's Royal Rifle Corps as a second lieutenant in September 1945, and was posted to Palestine and Kenya until 1948.

After returning to England, Hoskyns matriculated to King's College, Cambridge. While studying at Cambridge, he played first-class cricket for Cambridge University Cricket Club in 1949, making two appearances against Sussex and Warwickshire. He scored 63 runs in his two matches, with a highest score of 42 not out. In addition to playing cricket for Cambridge, Hoskyns also captained the university field hockey team. While at Cambridge he remained commissioned in the army. In April 1951 he was promoted to lieutenant, and was simultaneously made a temporary captain. A member of the Inner Temple, he was called to the bar to practice as a barrister in 1951, where he practiced on the Middle Circuit. During this time he lived in East London and in his spare time ran a boys' club. Hoskyns gave up his legal practice in 1954 to take holy orders. He died without issue in April 1956 at Powick, Worcestershire and was succeeded as the 16th Baronet by his brother, Sir Benedict Hoskyns.

Baronetage of England
Preceded by Sir Chandos Hoskyns	Baronet (of Harewood); 1945–1956	Succeeded by Sir Benedict Hoskyns
