= Rudolf Kittel =

German Old Testament scholar

Rudolf Kittel (28 March 1853, in Eningen, Württemberg – 20 October 1929, in Leipzig) was a German Old Testament scholar.

Kittel studied at University of Tübingen (1871–76). He was a professor of Old Testament studies at the universities of Breslau (1888–98) and Leipzig (1898–1923). In 1917 he was appointed rector at the University of Leipzig.

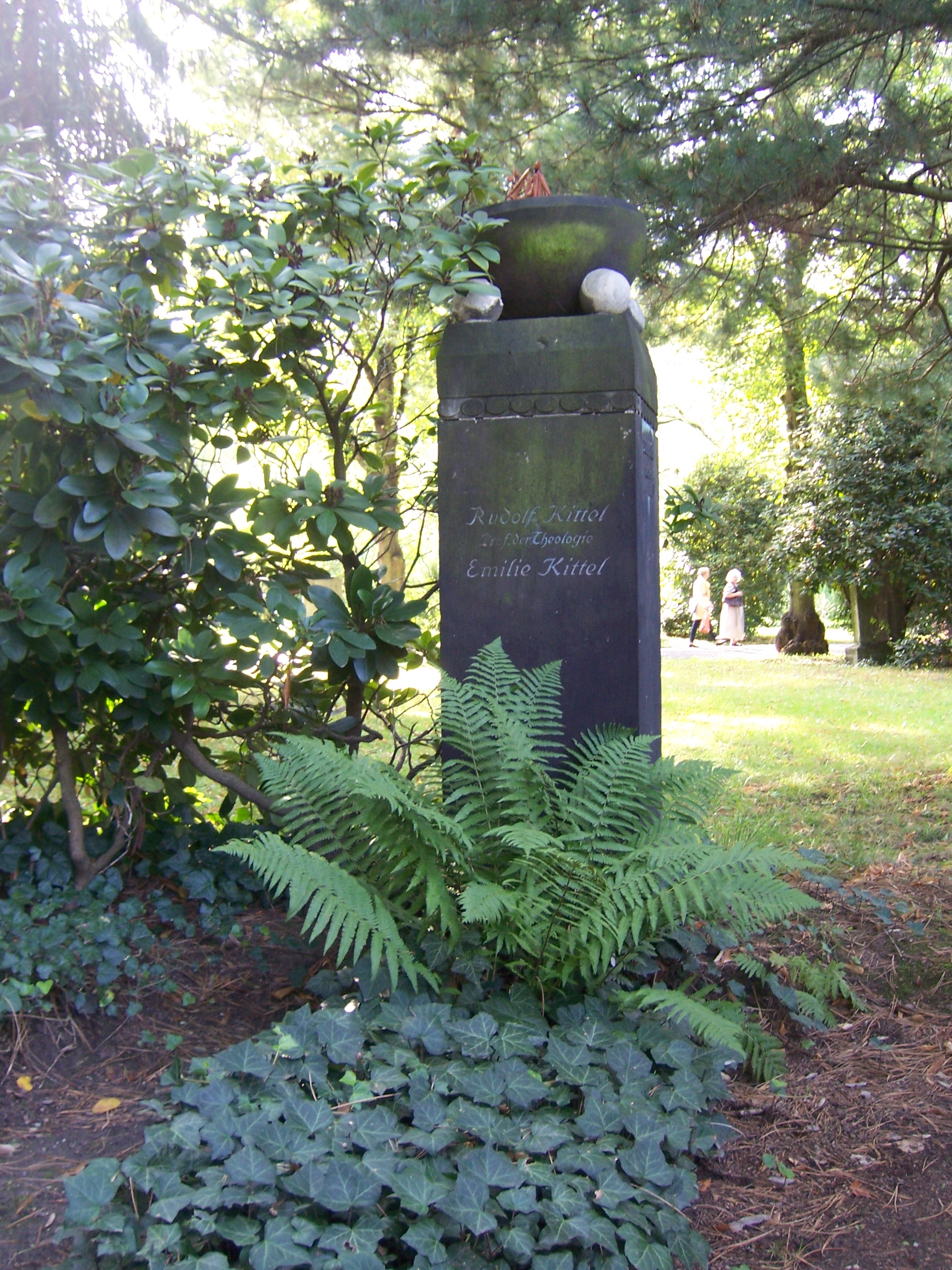
Gravestone of Rudolf Kittel, Südfriedhof (Leipzig).

He produced commentaries and histories of the Israelites and the Near East, but his most enduring work was his critical edition of the Hebrew scriptures, Biblia Hebraica, which has remained a standard text.

Kittel's son was the theologian and Nazi apologist Gerhard Kittel.

== Literary works ==
- Geschichte der Hebräer, 2 volumes, 1888–1892 – History of the Hebrews.
- Biblia Hebraica (BHK), 1909. (Hebrew Bible).
- Die Alttestamentliche Wissenschaft in ihren wichtigsten Ergebnissen mit Berücksichtigung des Religionsunterrichts, 1910 – Old Testament science and its most important results.
- Die Alttestamentliche Wissenschaft in ihren wichtigsten Ergebnissen dargestellt, 1917 – Old Testament science and its most important results; with regard to religious instruction.
- Die Religion des Volkes Israel, 1921 – The religion of the people of Israel.
- Geschichte des Volkes Israel, 1923 – History of the people of Israel.
- Gestalten und Gedanken in Israel, 1925.
