= Bennet Hoskyns =

English politician (1609–1680)

Coat of arms of Bennet Hoskyns

Crest
Out of a ducal coronet a lion’s head erased Or with flames of fire out of his mouth Proper crowned Or.
Escutcheon
Per pale Gules and Azure a chevron between three lions rampant Or.
Motto
Vincula Da Linguae Vel Tibi Lingua Dabit (Bind The Tongue Or The Tongue Will Thee)

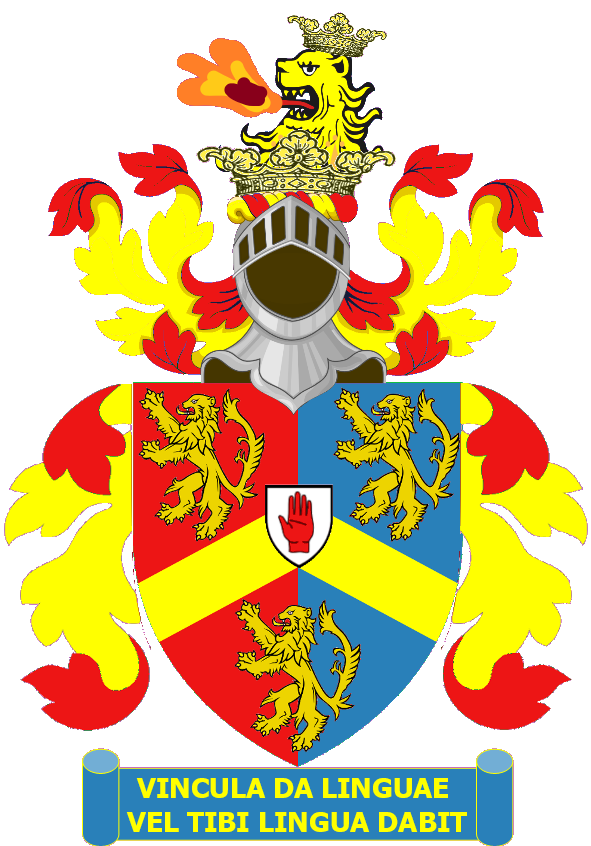
Achievement of arms

Sir Bennet Hoskyns, 1st Baronet (1609–1680) was an English politician who sat in the House of Commons variously between 1640 and 1659.

Hoskyns was the son of John Hoskyns of Hereford and his wife Benedicta Moyle, daughter of Robert Moyle of Buckwell, Kent. His father was a poet, lawyer and politician on whose death in 1638 Bennet inherited an estate at Moorhampton, near Hereford.

In April 1640, he was elected Member of Parliament for Wendover to the Short Parliament. He was then elected MP for Hereford in the Long Parliament of 1645, but was excluded in Pride's Purge. He was however re-elected for Hereford to the First Protectorate Parliament of 1654, and for Herefordshire to the Second Protectorate Parliament of 1656 and Third Protectorate Parliament of 1659.

At the end of the Civil War Hoskyns acquired (c. 1660) Harewood Park in Herefordshire from the Brown family. and was created a baronet on 18 December 1676.

He died in 1680 at the age of 71. He had married Anne Bingley, daughter of Sir John Bingley of Temple-Combe Somerset. Their son John succeeded to the baronetcy and Harewood Park.

Parliament of England
Vacant Parliament suspended since 1629	Member of Parliament for Wendover; 1640; With: Robert Croke	Succeeded by Robert Croke; Thomas Fountaine
Preceded by James Scudamore; Richard Seaborne	Member of Parliament for Hereford; 1646–1648; With: Edmund Weaver	Succeeded by Edmund Weaver
Vacant Unrepresented	Member of Parliament for Hereford; 1654	Succeeded by Wroth Rogers
Preceded by John Scudamore; John Pateshal; John Flacket; Richard Read	Member of Parliament for Herefordshire; 1656–59; With: James Berry 1656; Edward Harley 1656; Benjamin Mason 1656; Wroth Rogers 1659	Succeeded by Edward Harley; William Powell
Baronetage of England
New creation	Baronet (of Harewood); 1676–1680	Succeeded by John Hoskyns
