= Wren Hoskyns =

British paediatrician (1956–2015)

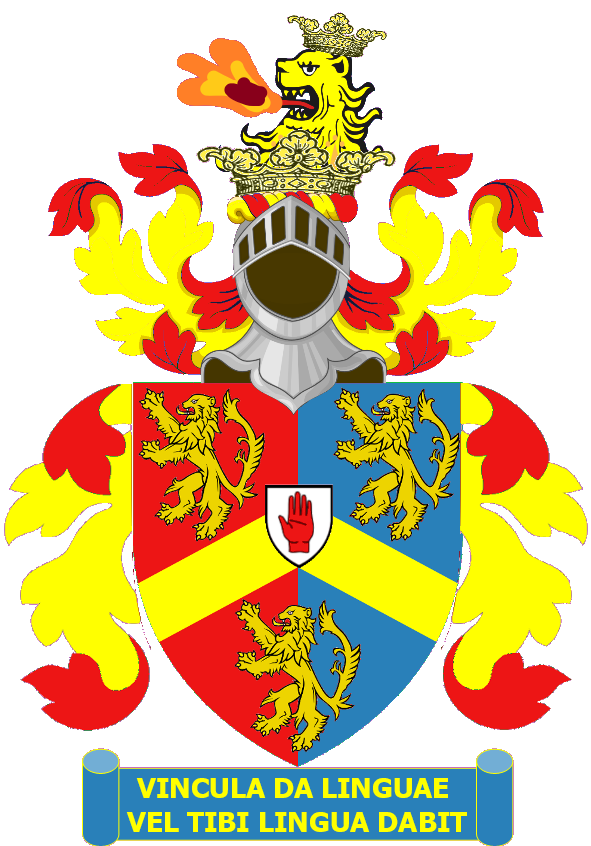
Achievement of arms

Sir Edwyn Wren Hoskyns (4 February 1956 – 19 February 2015) was a British paediatrician and researcher into childhood diseases, notably tuberculosis, and from 2 June 2010 the 17th Hoskyns Baronet of Harewood in the County of Hereford in the Baronetage of England. He died on 19 February 2015.

The 17th Bt carries and uses the name Wren that derives from the name of the son of the 7th Bt. who married Theodosia, the great-granddaughter of the famous English architect and polymath, Sir Christopher Wren. Theodosia was her father's only child, and married Chandos Wren-Hoskyns on 20 April 1837 after Chandos Hoskyns had his name changed in the previous week by Royal Licence. They had one daughter, who died without issue. Her Wren inheritance passed to her cousins in the Hoskyns family. The Hoskyns family continued to use Wren and Chandos in other branches in subsequent generations to keep the names alive.

== Family ==
Hoskyns was the son of physician Sir Benedict Leigh Hoskyns, 16th Baronet from 1956–2010, and Ann Wilkinson.

He married Winifred Jane Sellers, daughter of John Sellers, early in 1981. They had two children:

- A son, Robin Chevallier Hoskyns, b. 5 July 1989.
- Lucy Mary Hoskyns, b. 1993

== Education and work ==
He attended King's College School, Cambridge, as a chorister, and then Harwich County High School. He subsequently attended the University of Nottingham there graduating with Bachelor of Science and Master of Science degrees before graduating as a medical doctor (1980) specialising in paediatrics (1993). He was a Member (MRCP) and Fellow (FRCP) of the Royal College of Physicians. His paediatric research included considerable work with Tuberculosis (Phthisiatry). As of 2011, he was practising at Leicester General Hospital and Leicester Royal Infirmary.

=== Publications ===
Hoskyns' publications include:

- Tuberculous meningitis in children: problem to be addressed effectively with thorough contact tracing, Rajneesh Walia and Wren Hoskyns, European Journal of Pediatrics, Volume 159, Number 7, 535-538 (2000)
- Paediatric tuberculosis, postgraduate Medical Journal, 2003;79:272-278
- Treatment failure in Tuberculosis, ERJ Express. 29 November 2006

He is regularly cited and acknowledged by other published researchers in the field of childhood diseases, notably tuberculosis.

Coat of arms of Wren Hoskyns

Crest
Out of a ducal coronet a lion’s head erased Or with flames of fire out of his mouth Proper crowned Or.
Escutcheon
Per pale Gules and Azure a chevron between three lions rampant Or.
Motto
Vincula Da Linguae Vel Tibi Lingua Dabit (Bind The Tongue Or The Tongue Will Thee)

Baronetage of England
| Preceded by Benedict Hoskyns | Baronet (of Harewood); 2010–2015 | Succeeded by Robin Hoskyns |
