= Llanwarne =

Village in Herefordshire, England

Coordinates: 51°57′N 2°43′W

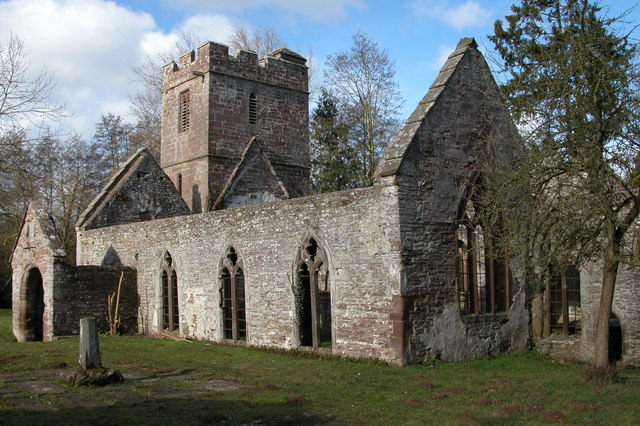
- The ruined church of St John the Baptist, Llanwarne

- Location within Herefordshire
- Population: 380 (2011 Census)
- Unitary authority: Herefordshire
- Shire county: Herefordshire
- Region: West Midlands
- Country: England
- Sovereign state: United Kingdom
- Post town: Hereford
- Postcode district: HR2
- Police: West Mercia
- Fire: Hereford and Worcester
- Ambulance: West Midlands
- UK Parliament: Hereford and South Herefordshire

Llanwarne is a village and civil parish in Herefordshire, England. The population of the civil Parish as taken at the 2011 census was 380. It is about 5 miles (8 km) from the Welsh border, is approximately 6 miles (10 km) north-west of Ross-on-Wye, and near Harewood End and Pencoyd.

Llanwarne is derived from "The church by the swamp/marsh or alders", according to The Oxford Dictionary of English Place-Names.

== Landmarks ==
According to the 1856 Kelly's Directory of Herefordshire there was a Wesleyan Chapel on the ridge to the north of the village at Turkey Tump. The 1913 Kelly's mentions Broom-y-clos Court. It describes Lyston Court as "a noble residence of stone, with 44 acres of park and grounds". The rectory was noted as adjacent to the site of the ruined church of St John.

=== Christ Church ===
Christ Church replaced the previous Church of St John the Baptist, which contained a chancel and nave built in the 13th century, later alterations, a rebuilt south aisle, and 14th-century churchyard cross. A tower, columbarium and a lych gate were added during the 15th century, and in the 16th an Elizabethan monument was placed on the south wall. The porch and doorway were built in the 17th century. This church was replaced by the current Christ Church, which is situated across the road on higher ground slightly to the west of the original site.

Christ Church dates to 1864, when it was built by Elmslie at a cost of £2,550. It is a cruciform building in the Early English Decorated Style, consisting of a polygonal chancel with vestry to the south, two-bay nave, transepts, north porch and a north-western tower, with spirelet. As a Grade II listed building, it is a significant example of Victorian craftsmanship, and holds a number of artifacts from the old church. The tiled floor is 19th century. The north-east, east and south-east windows depict the Nativity, Crucifixion and Resurrection, and are in memory of Walter Baskerville Mynors, rector from 1855 to 1896. The south transept contains an 1882 pipe organ by Eustace Ingram of London. Two windows on the south side of the nave contain a collection of 16th century stained glass round windows from the Netherlands, originally believed to portray traditional and biblical scenes. These windows show scenes from the late medieval Dutch morality tale Sorgheloos. Donated by Walter Baskerville Mynors (1826–1899), parish rector, the glass had been removed from the parish church of St Weonard's in 1884.

== Gallery ==
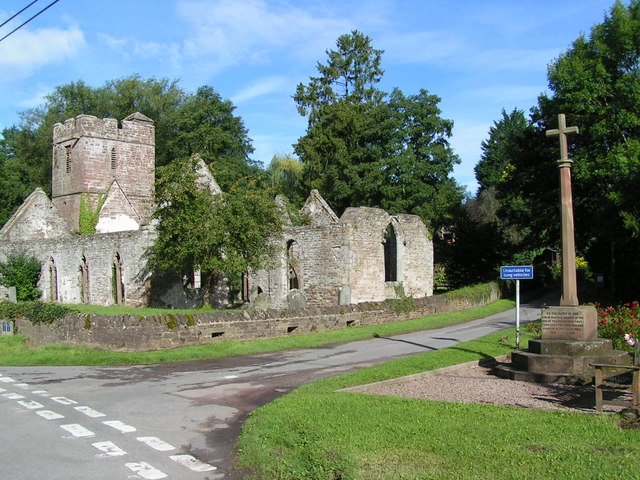
The church and war memorial

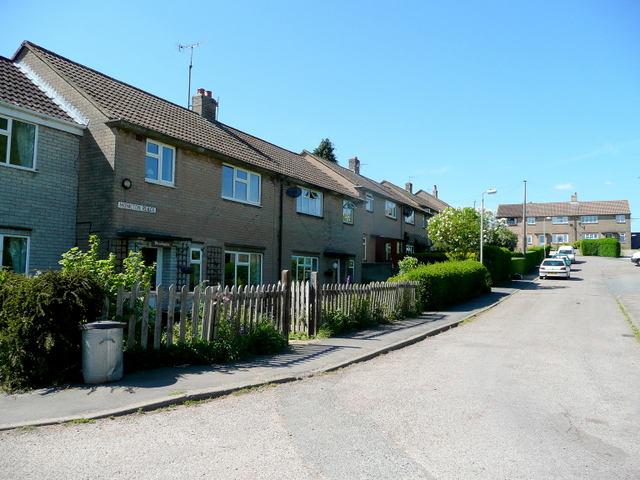
Cul-de-sac by the village

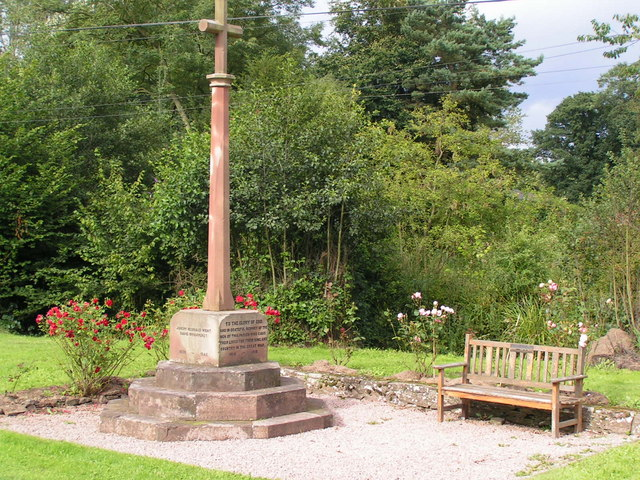
War memorial

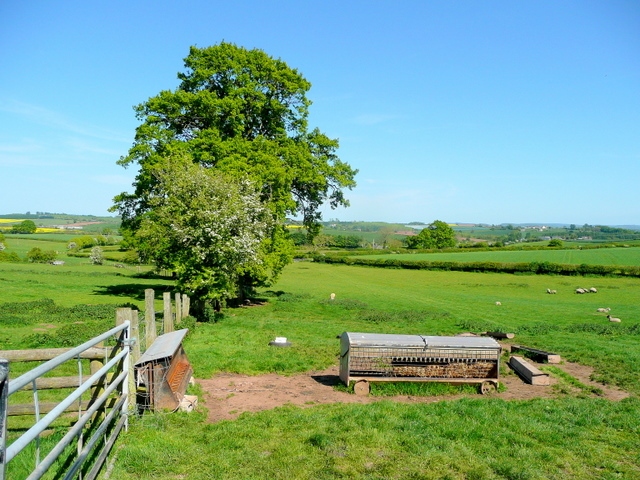
Farmland by the village (Upper Monkton)

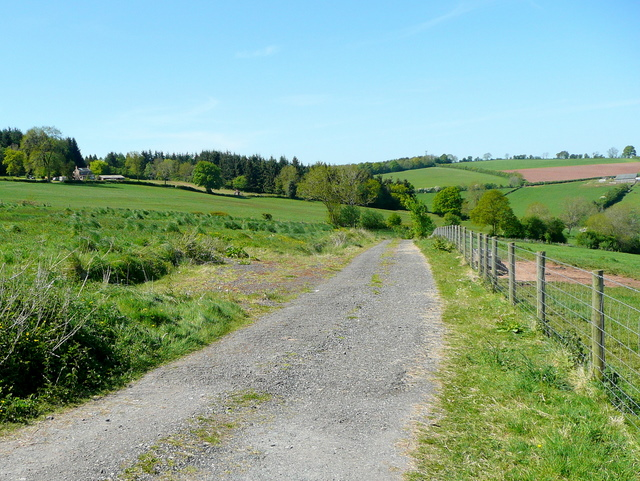
Orcop Hill by the village
