= Sir John Hoskyns, 2nd Baronet =

Founder and President of the Royal Society

Sir John Hoskyns Bt FRS
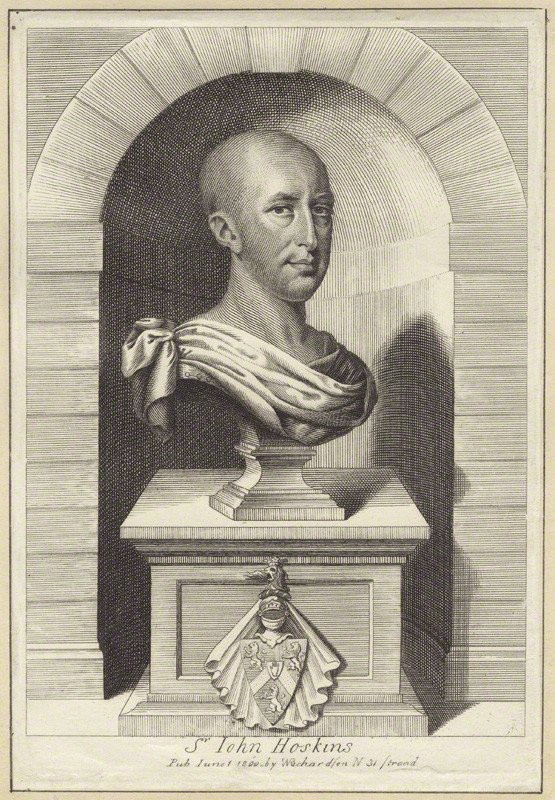

4th President of the Royal Society
- In office 1682–1683
- Preceded by: Christopher Wren
- Succeeded by: Cyril Wyche

Member of Parliament for Herefordshire
- In office 1685–1687

Personal details
- Born: 23 July 1634 Herefordshire
- Died: 12 September 1705 (aged 71)

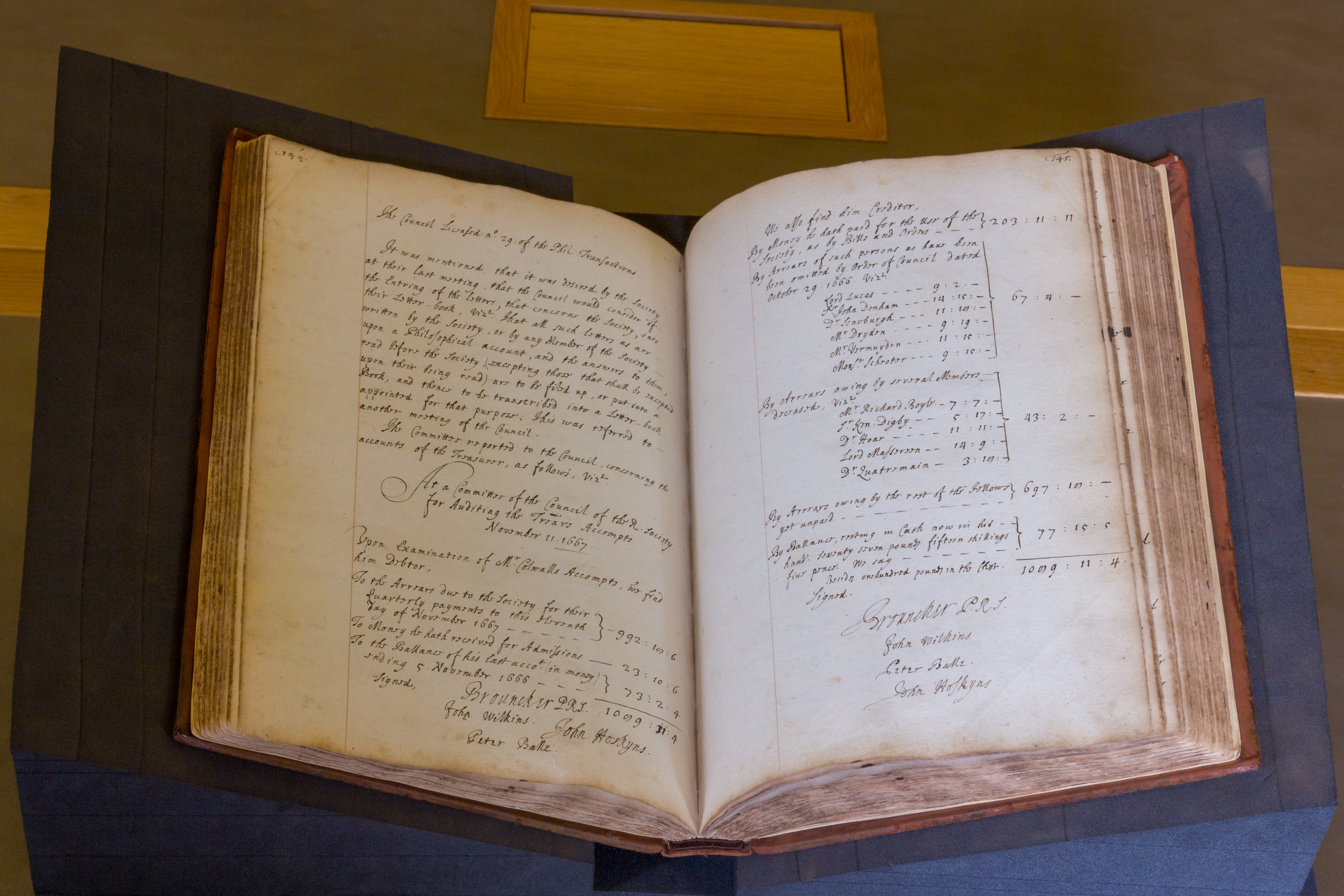
Hoskyn's signature, signing off the 1667 accounts of the Royal Society, from the Council Minutes

Sir John Hoskyns, 2nd Baronet FRS (23 July 1634 – 12 September 1705) was an English baronet.

He was one of the founders of the Royal Society and served as its president from 1682 to 1683. Between 1685 and 1687 he also represented Herefordshire in the House of Commons.

== Life ==
He was the eldest son of Sir Bennet Hoskyns, 1st Baronet, of Harewood and Morehampton Park, Herefordshire, and grandson of Serjeant John Hoskins, born in Herefordshire on 23 July 1634. He was educated in the rudiments of Latin by his mother, Anne, daughter of Sir John Bingley of Temple Combe, Somerset, and was later sent to Westminster School under Richard Busby.

Sir John married Jane, eldest daughter of Sir Gabriel Lowe of Newark, Gloucestershire by Ann Hungerford of South Marston. They lived at Harewood End, as did Jane continue in widowhood until 1724 when she died, and was buried in the church there. They left a large family. Of these Sir Bennet Hoskyns succeeded as 3rd baronet. His brother Sir Hungerford was the 4th baronet married to Mary, daughter of the Lord Chandos. Younger brother John was MA and Rector of Peterstow.

Hoskyns was called to the bar at the Middle Temple, and although he may have practised, acquired a reputation as a lawyer, and was made a master in chancery bench. In 1680 he succeeded his father in the baronetcy (having been knighted previously), and five years later was chosen Member of Parliament for Herefordshire; but was not active in politics.

Hoskyns was elected President of the Royal Society in 1682, in succession to his friend Sir Christopher Wren. His friends included Francis North, 1st Baron Guilford, John Evelyn, and John Aubrey. Sir John was elected to parliament called on the death of Charles II for Herefordshire. He resigned the chair the following year, but from 1685 to 1687 was secretary. He died on 12 September 1705, and was buried at Harewood, Herefordshire.

== Family ==
Hoskyns married Jane, daughter of Sir Gabriel Low, and his two sons, Bennet and Hungerford (d. 1766), were third and fourth baronets successively.

Coat of arms of Sir John Hoskyns, 2nd Baronet
Crest Out of a ducal coronet a lion’s head erased Or with flames of fire out of his mouth Proper crowned Or. Escutcheon Per pale Gules and Azure a chevron between three lions rampant Or. Motto Vincula Da Linguae Vel Tibi Lingua Dabit (Bind The Tongue Or The Tongue Will Thee)

== See also ==
- List of presidents of the Royal Society

Parliament of England
Preceded by The Viscount Scudamore; Sir Edward Harley	Member of Parliament for Herefordshire; 1685–1689; With: Sir John Morgan	Succeeded by John Morgan; Sir Edward Harley
Baronetage of England
Preceded by Bennet Hoskyns	Baronet (of Harewood); 1680–1705	Succeeded by Bennet Hoskyns
Professional and academic associations
Preceded by Christopher Wren	4th President of the Royal Society; 1682–1683	Succeeded by Cyril Wyche
