= Harewood, Herefordshire =

Civil parish in Herefordshire, England

Coordinates: 51.9506°N 2.68314°W

Harewood
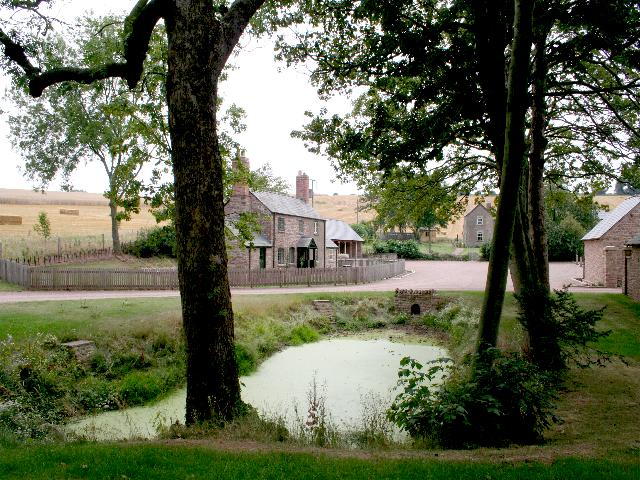
- Home Farm, Harewood Park

- Location within Herefordshire
- OS grid reference: SO531282
  - London: 115 mi (185 km) ESE
- Unitary authority: Herefordshire
- Ceremonial county: Herefordshire
- Region: West Midlands
- Country: England
- Sovereign state: United Kingdom
- Post town: Hereford
- Postcode district: HR2
- Police: West Mercia
- Fire: Hereford and Worcester
- Ambulance: West Midlands
- UK Parliament: Hereford and South Herefordshire

Harewood is a civil parish in Herefordshire, England. It is approximately 7 miles (11 km) south of the city and county town of Hereford and 4 miles (6 km) northwest of the market town of Ross-on-Wye. Within Harewood is the rural estate of Harewood Park, owned by the Duchy of Cornwall. The parish is part of the Wye Valley Area of Outstanding Natural Beauty.

Harewood is represented by one councillor on the ten-member Llanwarne & District Group Parish Council The parish is linked by bus at Harewood End to Hereford and Gloucester, with services provided by Stagecoach West. The closest National Rail station is at Hereford on the Welsh Marches Line, 6 miles (10 km) to the north.

== Geography ==
The parish borders the parishes of Hentland at the east, Pencoyd at the southwest, Llanwarne and Llandinabo at the northwest, and Little Birch at the north. It includes the hamlet of Harewood End at the extreme south and on the A49 road, which forms the border with Pencoyd and runs locally from Hereford at the north to Ross-on-Wye at the southeast. The closest village is Hoarwithy in Hentland, bordering at the extreme north-east of the parish.

Harewood is approximately 2 miles (3 km) from north to south and 1.5 miles (2.4 km) at its widest from the north-west to south-east. It is entirely rural, with farms, fields, woods, isolated ponds, and dispersed properties. A stream rising at the north-west of the parish flows east to the Wriggle Brook, a tributary of the River Wye in Hentland. Within the parish are Home Farm, Grange Farm, Woodlands Farm and Redbrook Farm. Apart from the A49, all routes are footpaths, bridleways and farm tracks.

== Landmarks ==
Harewood is north-west of the Wye Valley Area of Outstanding Natural Beauty (AONB). The principal landmark of the parish is the rural estate of Harewood Park, owned by the Duchy of Cornwall. Its house, demolished in 1959, was rebuilt in 1839 by Sir Hungerford Hoskyns, 7th Baronet (1776–1862), on the site of the previous Tudor house. The Park includes the seven Grade II listed buildings of the parish, including the former parish church of St Denis, rebuilt in 1864 but today a store, and Grange Farmhouse, possibly dating to the 17th century. Listed at the west of the church is the pedestal tomb 'Hoskyns Monument' and a former late 18th-century stable block, which at the time of the 1987 listing was a dog-breeding station. At the south-west of the farmhouse are a late 18th-century cowhouse, an 18th-century granary, and a late 18th-century barn.
