= Edwyn Gray =

British writer (1927–2005)

Edwyn Alfred Gray (17 July 1927 – 17 December 2005) was a British writer who specialised in naval writing although at times has written short stories.

== Life and career ==
Edwyn Alfred Gray was born in London on 17 July 1927. He was educated at the Royal Grammar School, High Wycombe. Gray read economics at the University of London and then joined the British civil service.

His writing career began in 1953 when he started writing for magazines. Gray's first book was published in 1969, and he became a full-time writer in 1980. He moved to Norfolk and devoted his time to writing, research and consultancy.

Gray died in Buckinghamshire on 17 December 2005, aged 78.

== Bibliography ==
His books have been published both in the United Kingdom and the United States, and many have been translated into other languages. His works include:

- A damned un-English weapon: the story of British submarine warfare, 1914–18 (1971)
- The underwater war; submarines, 1914–1918 (1971)
- The Killing Time: the U-boat War, 1914–18 (1972)
- The Devil's device: the story of Robert Whitehead, inventor of the torpedo (1975)
- Fighting submarine (1979)
- Diving Stations (1984)
- Crash dive 500 (1985)
- Few survived: a comprehensive survey of submarine accidents and disasters (1986)
- Submarine Warriors (1989)
- Operation Pacific: the Royal Navy's war against Japan, 1941–1945 (1991)
- Hitler's Battleships (1993)
- The U-Boat War, 1914–1918 (1994)
- Nineteenth-century torpedoes and their inventors (2004)
