= Harewood (material) =

Used to make the backs of stringed instruments

The term harewood, airwood or hairwood originally described a type of maple wood, including sycamore maple, with a curled or "fiddleback" figure, used to make the backs of stringed instruments. In 17th-century England it was imported from Germany. The earliest published use of the term is probably that in the 1670 edition of Sylva:

I would also add something concerning what Woods are observed to be most sonorous for Musical Instruments: We as yet detect few but the German Air, which is a species of Maple, for the Rimms of Viols and the choicest and finest grain'd Fir for the Bellyes. A slightly later citation occurs in Thomas Mace's Musick's Monument of 1676; "The Air-wood is absolutely the Best, and next to that our English Maple".

In the 18th century airwood came to be used by marqueteurs; for most artificial colours they used holly, which takes vegetable dyes very well, but airwood was employed either in its natural off-white state or stained with iron sulphate to produce a range of silver and silver-grey hues. The reason that airwood was preferred to holly for this colour was that it gave a metallic sheen or lustre, while holly dyed by the same process turned a rather dead grey. The use of airwood in this way meant that by the 19th century it was associated specifically with that colour, and at the same time name gradually changed from airwood to harewood.

In a relatively short space of time the action of the chemicals, together with natural oxidization, turns harewood brown, sometimes with a greyish or greenish hue, which is how the wood now appears on old marquetry. The notion that harewood and other coloured woods can be produced by injecting dyes into the roots of trees appears to be an old wives' tale of some antiquity, perhaps propagated by marqueteurs to protect their trade secrets.
