= John Hoskin =

British sculptor

- Born: 1921; Cheltenham, England
- Died: 1990 (aged 68–69)
- Known for: Sculpture
- Movement: St Ives School

John Hoskin (1921–1990) was a British sculptor from Cheltenham. He began drawing when he returned from Germany after serving in the Second World War. Terry Frost, a painter from the St. Ives school encouraged him to become a sculptor. John while working as an architect's draftsman but longing to become an artist, knew of the group working in St.Ives and decided to hitch-hike there one day. By a remarkable co-incidence, he was picked up and given a lift by Terry. By the time they arrived, John knew being a sculptor was his destiny. It was he that said "as if up until that journey my life had been playing out of tune."

He began sculpting in the early 1950s, working with metal. His works combined shiny curved surfaces with contrasting black welded comb of rods that held them together, a conflict of geometric and organic forms.

His work can be found in the Tate Gallery, the Victoria and Albert Museum, the British Council collection and various other galleries around the world — in America, Yugoslavia, New Zealand and Australia. He refused to allow one style to dominate his sculptures, even though this often alienated him from those who had supported his earlier works.

He has taught at the Bath Academy in Corsham, and as the head of painting at Winchester, a visiting lecturer at Newcastle, and a Professor of Fine Art at Leicester Polytechnic.
