= Sir Edwyn Hoskyns, 12th Baronet =

British Anglican bishop

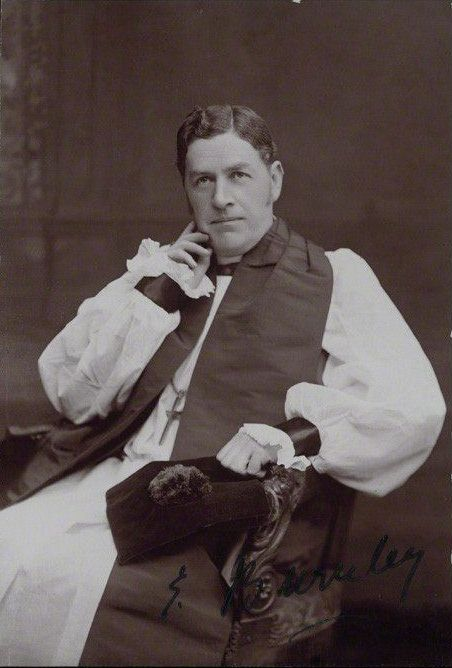
Photograph by N.S. Kay, c. 1890–1910

Sir Edwyn Hoskyns, 12th Baronet (22 May 1851 – 2 December 1925) was a British Anglican bishop who served in the Church of England in the early 20th century.

== Early life ==
Edwyn Hoskyns was born at Aston Tirrold (where his father was Rector), fourth son of John Leigh Hoskyns (9th Baronet) and Emma (daughter of John Peyton KCH). He was educated at Lancing College, Haileybury and Imperial Service College, and then Jesus College, Cambridge, from which he obtained a BA in 1873 and MA in 1880. He was succeeded in the baronetcy by his only son, theologian Edwyn Clement Hoskyns (1884–1937).

== Career ==
He was ordained deacon in 1874 and priest in the Church of England in 1875; and was assistant curate at Welwyn in Hertfordshire 1875–1879 and Quebec Chapel, London 1879–1881 to Canon F. J. Holland.(

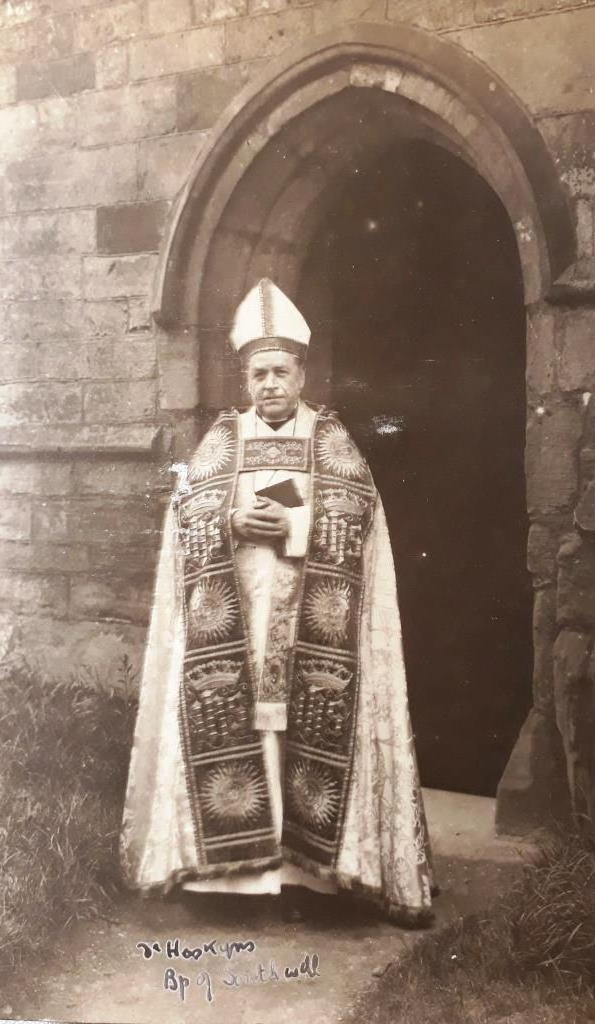
Rt Rev Edwyn Hoskyns, Bishop of Southwell

He was Vicar of St Clement, Notting Hill from 1880 to 1886, Rector of St Dunstan's, Stepney from 1886 to 1895, Vicar of Bolton Parish Church from 1895 to 1901, and an Honorary Canon of Manchester Cathedral. In September 1901 he was appointed Suffragan Bishop of Burnley, and he was consecrated as bishop in York Minster on 18 October 1901. He was appointed Bishop of Southwell in 1904, was offered but turned down the position of Archbishop of Cape Town in 1908, and remained Bishop of Southwell until his death in 1925.

He received the degree Doctor of Divinity (DD) from Jesus College, Cambridge, in December 1901.

Hoskyns was an Acting Chaplain to the 2nd Volunteer Battalion of the Loyal North Lancashire Regiment until he resigned as such in May 1902.

Hoskyns was a strong supporter of British involvement in the Great War. After receiving reports of German atrocities against Belgian and French citizens, he wrote, 'It is witness sufficient of the utter unfitness of Germany to take any lead among modern nations; and it is sufficient to justify our gallant sons in their determination to put an end to the unbearable idea of German supremacy in Europe,’ Three years later, despite heavy casualties, Hoskyns referred back to the declaration of War in August, 1914. 'The nation as a nation leapt to arms, and our sons have died for no sordid purpose, but for righteousness, for mercy, for liberty. Let it rather be our boast.' In January, 1918, he wrote, 'I have never feared to speak of this war as a Holy War for our allies, and of our men as crusaders.'

The monthly diocesan magazines show Hoskins's pride at so many clergy volunteering as chaplains and in other roles such as combatants. The magazines also record relatives of clergy who were in the services including wounded and deceased.

Hoskyns's son, Clement, was awarded a MC as a Temporary Chaplain to the Forces.

A snapshot of Hoskyns and Southwell is provided in a letter of Mrs Dorothy Otter, wife of the Bishop of Grantham. She was friendly with Evy, one of Hoskyns's daughters, and witnessed dinner parties at the Bishop's Palace with evening gowns etc.. She wrote of Hoskyns, 'He was and still is my idea of a real bishop – dignified but not pompous – humorous and very human – but a man of prayer and discipline in his personal life – a true servant of his Master'.

== Arms ==
Coat of arms of Sir Edwyn Hoskyns, 12th Baronet
Crest Out of a ducal coronet a lion’s head erased Or with flames of fire out of his mouth Proper crowned Or. Escutcheon Per pale Gules and Azure a chevron between three lions rampant Or. Motto Vincula Da Linguae Vel Tibi Lingua Dabit (Bind The Tongue or the Tongue Will Thee)

== Bibliography ==
- Richard E. Parsons, Sir Edwyn Hoskyns as a Biblical Theologian (1985), C, Hurst & Co. ISBN 1850650179

Church of England titles
Preceded by Inaugural appointment	Bishop of Burnley; 1901–1904	Succeeded by Alfred Pearson
Preceded by George Ridding	Bishop of Southwell; 1904–1925	Succeeded by Bernard Heywood
Baronetage of England
Preceded by Leigh Hoskyns	Baronet (of Harewood); 1923–1925	Succeeded by Edwyn Hoskyns
