= Harewood Park =

Country estate in Herefordshire, England

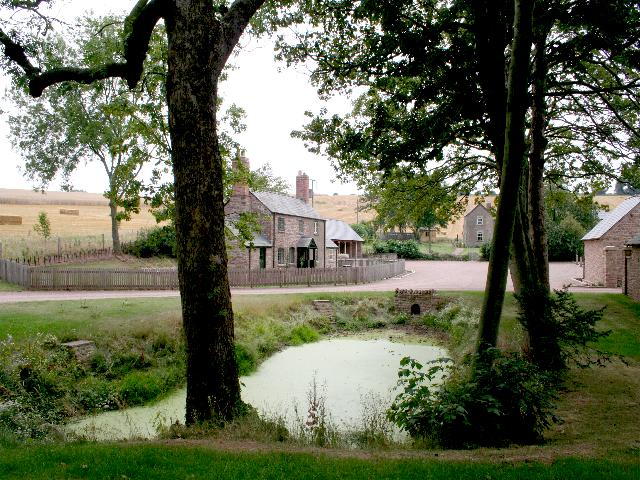
- Former farm buildings on the estate, now converted into residential accommodation
- Interactive map of Harewood Park
- Type: Rural estate
- Location: Harewood End, Hereford, England
- Coordinates: 51.9495°N 2.6844°W (grid reference SO529280)
- Area: 900 acres (360 ha)
- Operator: Duchy of Cornwall

Harewood Park is a rural estate of 900 acres (360 ha) in the civil parish of Harewood in Herefordshire, England, which has been owned by the Duchy of Cornwall since 2000. It is approximately midway between Hereford and Ross-on-Wye.

== History ==
The land at Harewood Park was part of a royal hunting estate, which was granted by King John to the Knights Templar of the nearby village of Garway in 1215. By 1312 it was recorded as containing a hall, grange and chapel. After the Knights Templar were disbanded, the estate passed to the Knights Hospitaller until the Dissolution of the Monasteries under Henry VIII. The land was then sold, first to the brothers Robert and Hugh Thornhill and then, in 1547, to the Browne family who built a large house on the site. Around 1651–54, the house was bought by Bennet Hoskyns MP, who had the unusual distinction of both being appointed a High Sheriff under Cromwell, and later being made a baronet by Charles II. The estate remained in the ownership of the Hoskyns family for almost 300 years.

In 1781 the Tudor house was demolished and a new house, set in parkland with terraced walks, was built on the site. The house was again substantially rebuilt in 1839 by the 7th Baronet, Sir Hungerford Hoskyns, who had built an 11-bay, three-storey entrance front, featuring a grand porch with Tuscan columns, and two wings. The chapel was rebuilt in 1862.

The declining fortunes of the Hoskyns family resulted in the house being sold in 1892 to Henry Harrison Parry, who also owned a brewery in Leicester. On his death in 1908, he was buried in the graveyard of the estate chapel of St Denis. The estate was then owned for eight years by his brother Joseph, and then by Henry Parry's eldest daughter, Evelyn Foster. She sold it in 1927.

In 1941 Harewood Park was sold to the Trustees of Guy's Hospital. It was used as an auxiliary hospital during World War II, but was deemed surplus to requirements after the war. The building decayed, its fixtures and fittings were sold off in 1959, and the shell of the house was used for demolition practice by the Royal Engineers. A modern bungalow, described as "wildly inappropriate", was built on the site in the 1960s.

== Redevelopment ==
In May 2000, the estate was purchased by the Duchy of Cornwall as part of its acquisition of property owned by Prudential plc. In 2003, plans were prepared for what the Duchy described as a "rural regeneration project", involving the restoration of three groups of buildings at Home Farm, Grange Farm, and Harewood Park itself, at an estimated cost of £8-9 million. The architect is Craig Hamilton. Home Farm and Grange Farm are intended to be developed as cottages and workshops. Overall, the intention is to undertake restoration on the basis of principles of environmental sustainability, and including the use of local sandstone from a reopened local quarry, and locally sourced timber. New woodland was to be planted, and schemes were included to retain water run-off and filter sewage in reed filtration beds. Prince Charles was reportedly personally involved in details of the scheme.

The Duchy's website states:

When complete the project will consist of a replacement principal dwelling as a focal point of the estate, the restoration of a Grade II listed stable block and former chapel together with the sympathetic rebuilding of eight additional dwellings linked with more than 10,000 square feet (930 m^{2}) of high quality offices offering a combination of residential and workplace facilities for up to 100 people.

The new house will be built on the site of the historic house. Three possible designs have been drawn up for the replacement house, for which outline planning consent was granted by Herefordshire Council in 2007. The agreed proposal is for a six-bedroom house, considerably scaled down from the original designs put forward in 2004. The proposed design is intended to echo that of existing stable blocks on the site, with arches influenced by the designs of Sir John Soane. According to Hamilton:

Three designs have been prepared for the site and two of these have received planning consent. The first design refers to the work of Schinkel in Potsdam. The second is a synthesis of Greek and Roman references. The third design has developed out of the triumphal arch motif which is repeated in the design of the surviving early 19th century stables on the site. The new house is to be built out of local sandstone quarried on the Estate.

In 2016 the walled garden and former fishing lake were restored.

== Media speculation ==
The Duchy of Cornwall denied that the new house would be the home of any member of the royal family, although there was local and national speculation that the house would become the main residence of Prince William and his wife Catherine, Duchess of Cambridge.

This speculation died down after Anmer Hall on the Sandringham estate was named in April 2013 as the official country residence of William and Catherine when the lease expired.
