= Sir Edwyn Hoskyns, 13th Baronet =

English Anglican priest and theologian (1884–1937)

The Reverend Sir Edwyn Hoskyns Bt MC
- Born: Edwyn Clement Hoskyns; 9 August 1884; London, England
- Died: 28 June 1937 (aged 52); London, England
- Spouse: Mary Trym Budden (m. 1922)
- Parents: Edwyn Hoskyns; Mary Maude

Ecclesiastical career
- Religion: Christianity (Anglican)
- Church: Church of England
- Ordained: 1908 (deacon); ? (priest)

Academic background
- Education: Jesus College, Cambridge
- Influences: Karl Barth; Gerhard Kittel

Academic work
- Discipline: Biblical studies; theology
- Sub-discipline: Biblical theology
- School or tradition: Anglo-Catholicism
- Institutions: Corpus Christi College, Cambridge
- Influenced: C. K. Barrett; Christopher Evans; Gabriel Hebert; Donald Lynch; Michael Ramsey; Edward Roberts

Sir Edwyn Clement Hoskyns, 13th Baronet, MC (9 August 1884 – 28 June 1937) was an English Anglican priest and theologian.

== Career ==
Hoskyns was born on 9 August 1884 in Notting Hill, London, the eldest child and only son of Bishop Edwyn Hoskyns and his wife Mary Constance Maude Benson. He was educated at Haileybury College, Jesus College, Cambridge and Wells Theological College, graduating from the latter in 1907. Hoskyns was a fellow and Dean of Corpus Christi College, Cambridge, and a notable biblical scholar. On his father's death in 1925, he succeeded to the Hoskyns baronetcy. His influence on the next generation of clergymen was considerable, e.g., on Michael Ramsey, Gabriel Hebert, Christopher Evans, Donald Lynch, and C. K. Barrett.

Hoskyns served in the Great War as a Temporary Chaplain to the Forces. He was commissioned in July 1915, and served in Egypt and France. He was described as 'A capable chaplain. Hard worker. Has made a good SCF (Senior Chaplain to the Forces).' He was awarded the Military Cross, 'For conspicuous gallantry and devotion to duty. Under heavy shell fire he personally placed wounded in a safe place, and was solely responsible from preventing them falling into the hands of the enemy. He remained with them until all had been evacuated, being slightly wounded himself. Next day he showed conspicuous courage in tending wounded in an exposed position under heavy shell and machine-gun fire for nine hours without a break.'

He died on 28 June 1937 in London and was buried in Grantchester, Cambridgeshire.

== Writings ==
- The Riddle of the New Testament. With Francis Noel Davey. London: Faber & Faber, 1931
- The Epistle to the Romans, by Karl Barth; translated from the 6th edition by Edwyn C. Hoskyns. Oxford University Press, 1933
- Cambridge Sermons. London: SPCK, 1938
- The Fourth Gospel. London: Faber & Faber, 1940
- Crucifixion-Resurrection: The Pattern of the Theology and Ethics of the New Testament. Edwyn Clement Hoskyns & Francis Noel Davey. London: SPCK, 1981.

== Arms ==
Coat of arms of Sir Edwyn Hoskyns, 13th Baronet
Crest Out of a ducal coronet a lion's head erased Or with flames of fire out of his mouth Proper crowned Or. Escutcheon Per pale Gules and Azure a chevron between three lions rampant Or. Motto Vincula Da Linguae Vel Tibi Lingua Dabit (Bind The Tongue or the Tongue Will Thee)

Baronetage of England
Preceded by Sir Edwyn Hoskyns	Baronet (of Harewood); 1925–1937	Succeeded by Chandos Hoskyns
