= Hoskyns baronets =

Title in the Baronetage of England

The Hoskyns Baronetcy, of Harewood in the County of Hereford, is a title in the Baronetage of England. It was created on 18 December 1676 for Bennet Hoskyns, Member of Parliament for Wendover, Hereford and Herefordshire. He was the son of the poet, lawyer and politician John Hoskins. The second Baronet was one of the founders of the Royal Society and served as its president from 1682 to 1683. The fourth Baronet fought under the Duke of Marlborough in the War of the Spanish Succession and also represented Herefordshire in the House of Commons. The twelfth Baronet was Lord Bishop of Southwell from 1904 to 1925.

Four other members of the family may also be mentioned: Peyton Hoskyns, fifth son of the ninth Baronet, was a Rear-Admiral in the Royal Navy; John Hoskyns, grandson of Benedict Hoskyns, was Head of the Prime Minister's Policy Unit from 1979 to 1982; Anthony Hoskyns-Abrahall (1903–1982), great-grandson of John Hoskyns-Abrahall (a priest, 1773–1840), himself grandson of John Hoskyns-Abrahall (another priest, 1692–1765), who assumed the additional surname of Abrahall, himself youngest son of John Hoskyns, 2nd Baronet, was Bishop of Lancaster; Theo Chandos Hoskyns-Abrahall (called Chandos, 1896–1975), grandson of Theophilus Bennet Hoskyns-Abrahall, himself second son of John Hoskyns Abrahall (1773–1840), was Deputy-Governor of Nigeria.

== Hoskyns baronets, of Harewood (1676) ==
Hoskyns baronets
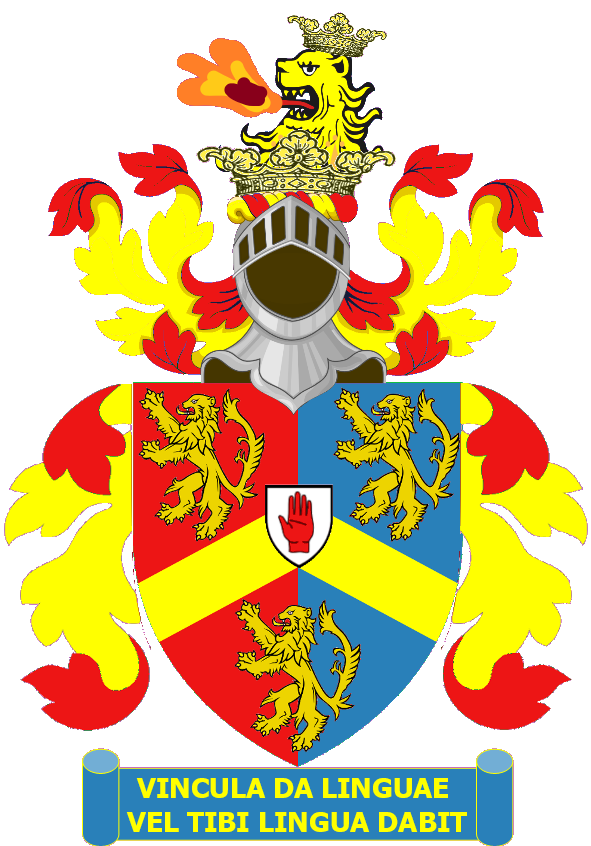
- Crest: Out of a ducal coronet a lion’s head erased Or with flames of fire out of his mouth Proper crowned Or.
- Shield: Per pale Gules and Azure a chevron between three lions rampant Or.
- Motto: Vincula Da Linguae Vel Tibi Lingua Dabit (Bind The Tongue Or The Tongue Will Thee)

- Sir Bennet Hoskyns, 1st Baronet (1609–1680)
- Sir John Hoskyns, 2nd Baronet (1634–1705)
- Sir Bennet Hoskyns, 3rd Baronet (1675–1711)
- Sir Hungerford Hoskyns, 4th Baronet (c. 1677–1767)
- Sir Chandos Hoskyns, 5th Baronet (1720–1773)
- Sir Hungerford Hoskyns, 6th Baronet (c. 1753 – 1802)
- Sir Hungerford Hoskyns, 7th Baronet (1776–1862)
- Sir Hungerford Hoskyns, 8th Baronet (1804–1877)
- Sir John Leigh Hoskyns, 9th Baronet (1817–1911)
- Sir Chandos Hoskyns, 10th Baronet (1848–1914)
- Sir Leigh Hoskyns, 11th Baronet (1850–1923)
- Sir Edwyn Hoskyns, 12th Baronet (1851–1925)
- Sir Edwyn Clement Hoskyns, 13th Baronet (1884–1937)
- Sir Chandos Wren Hoskyns, 14th Baronet (1923–1945)
- Sir John Chevallier Hoskyns, 15th Baronet (1926–1956)
- Sir Benedict Leigh Hoskyns, 16th Baronet (1928–2010)
- Sir Edwyn Wren Hoskyns, 17th Baronet (1956–2015)
- Sir Robin Chevallier Hoskyns, 18th Baronet (born 1989)

The heir presumptive to the baronetcy is John Chandos Hoskyns (born 1961), second son of the 16th Baronet.
