= RSO =

RSO or R.S.O. may refer to:

== Roles and titles ==
- Range safety officer, a person responsible for the safe use of rocket vehicles
- Radiation Safety Officer, a person responsible for the safe use of radiation and radioactive materials
- Regional Security Officer, a Diplomatic Security Service Special Agent in charge of security at a US embassy
- Regional Security Office, office in a US embassy or consulate for the Diplomatic Security Service
- Riddare av Svärdsorden, Knight of the Order of the Sword
- Reconnaissance systems officer, operator of surveillance systems and equipment on a Lockheed SR-71 Blackbird aircraft

== Organisations ==
- "Radio Symphony Orchestra", used by a number of orchestras:
  - Danish National Symphony Orchestra, based in Denmark
  - North German Radio Symphony Orchestra, based in Hamburg, Germany
  - Stuttgart Radio Symphony Orchestra, based in Stuttgart, Germany
  - Bavarian Radio Symphony Orchestra, based in Munich, Germany
  - Frankfurt Radio Symphony Orchestra, based in Frankfurt, Germany
  - Finnish Radio Symphony Orchestra
  - Swedish Radio Symphony Orchestra
  - Vienna Radio Symphony Orchestra
- Richardson Symphony Orchestra, based in Richardson, Texas
- Roanoke Symphony Orchestra, based in Roanoke, Virginia
- Rogers Sportsnet Ontario, a television station in Ontario, Canada
- RSO Records, a record label formed by Robert Stigwood in the late 1960s
- Rohingya Solidarity Organisation, a political organization and former insurgent group in Myanmar (Burma)

== Military technology ==
- Raupenschlepper, Ost, a fully tracked World War II German artillery tractor
- Radschlepper Ost, a wheeled World War II German artillery tractor

== Other ==
- Railway Sub Office (1855–1905), a British Royal Mail office which received mail directly from rail transport
- Reactive Search Optimization, problem-solving methods with integrated online machine-learning capabilities
- Revised Statutes of Ontario, the provincial laws of Ontario, Canada
- Registered sex offender, a person listed on a sex offender registry
- Republic of South Ossetia, a partially recognised country in the South Caucasus
- Resident Space Object, any man-made object in Earth orbit no longer used by anyone
- Ryan Scott Oliver, an American musical theater songwriter
- RSO, musical duo consisting of American musician Richie Sambora and Australian musician Orianthi
- Rick Simpson Oil, a form of cannabis concentrate
- Red Star OS, also abbreviated as RSOS, is a North Korean operating system
