= Dewsall =

Civil parish in Herefordshire, England

Coordinates: 51.9970°N 2.75244°W

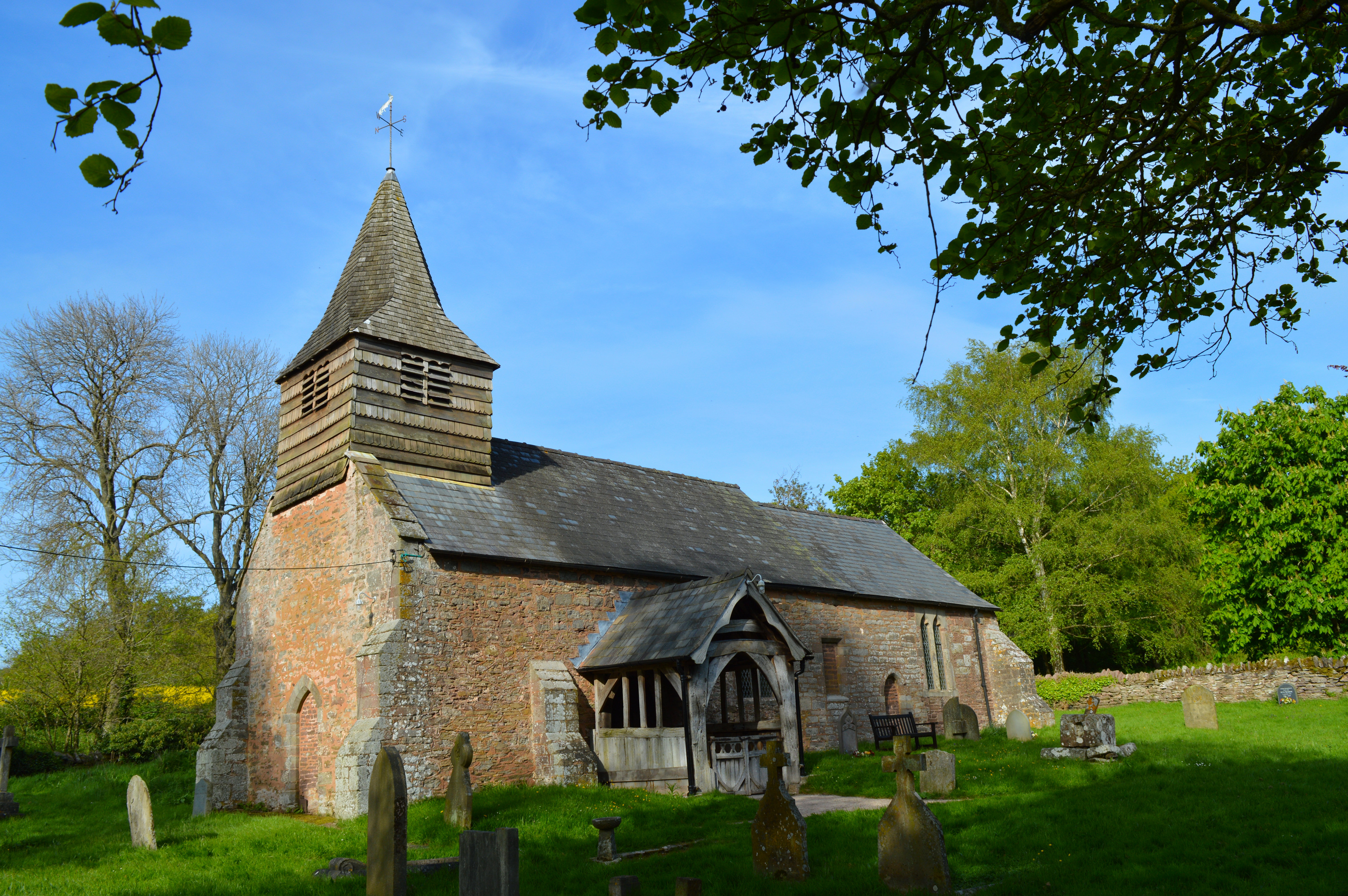
- St Michael's church

- Location within Herefordshire
- OS grid reference: SO484334
  - London: 120 mi (190 km) SE
- Unitary authority: Herefordshire
- Ceremonial county: Herefordshire
- Region: West Midlands
- Country: England
- Sovereign state: United Kingdom
- Post town: Hereford
- Postcode district: HR2
- Dialling code: 01432
- Police: West Mercia
- Fire: Hereford and Worcester
- Ambulance: West Midlands
- UK Parliament: Hereford & South Herefordshire

Dewsall is a civil parish in south Herefordshire, England, approximately 4 miles (6 km) south from the city and county town of Hereford. The nearest market town is Ross-on-Wye 9 miles (14 km) to the south-east. Within Dewsall is the Grade II* listed Church of St Michael, and the birthplace of James Brydges, 1st Duke of Chandos.

== History ==
In the Domesday Book Dewsall was part of the Hundred of Wormelow, and contained four smallholders (middle level of serfs owning about 5 acres (2.0 ha) of land, below and with less land than a villager), one slave, and one priest. Its area was one ploughland, with two lord's and two men's plough teams. The manorial lord in 1066 was Wulfheah, the manor in 1086 transferred to Ilbert (son of Turold), the abbey of Lyre (Sainte-Marie), and William (the brother of Ilbert), under king William I, who was his own tenant-in-chief. Dewsall in 1242 was written as "Dewyes Welle" and "Deuwewell", and in 1291 as "Deweswall", indicating a reference to St David's spring", 'Dewi' being the Welsh form of David. At the time the place was just over a mile from Dewchurch (Much and Little).

=== 19th century ===
From the 1850s Dewsall is reported as a township and an "exceedingly small parish" on the Hereford to Ross road, about 3.5 miles (6 km) south from Hereford, 11 miles (18 km) miles north-west from Ross, and about 2 miles (3 km) east from the Tram Inn railway station on the Newport, Abergavenny and Hereford Railway line. It was listed as in the Webtree hundred, the Hereford Union—poor relief and joint parish workhouse provision set up under the Poor Law Amendment Act 1834— and in the archdeaconry, deanery, and Diocese of Hereford. The parish church of St Michael is described as a "very old building" and "curious old structure" with a chancel, nave, porch, and a tower with three bells in 1850, and two in 1856. The church was entirely restored in 1868. Within the church were three memorials to the Pearl family, whose sole heiress intermarried with the families of Buckingham and Chandos. The Duke of Buckingham formerly resided at Dewsall, the estate later was sold to the Governors of Guy's Hospital, who were the lords of the manor and chief landowner. The ecclesiastical parish was 'Dewsall with Callow', its incumbent's living being in the gift of a W. B. Mynor of the south Herefordshire Treago Castle in the parish of St Weonards, and comprised 2 acres (0.81 ha) of glebe—area of land used to support the parish church and priest—and a residence. No charities were connected to the parish. Population in 1851 was 30; in 1861, 36; and in 1871, 35. Mid-19th-century parish residents included the parish priest, living at the vicarage, and a farmer at Dewsall Farm. Parish area was 676 acres (274 ha), with soil comprising red clay over a subsoil of gravel. Mail was processed through Hereford, which was the nearest money order office.

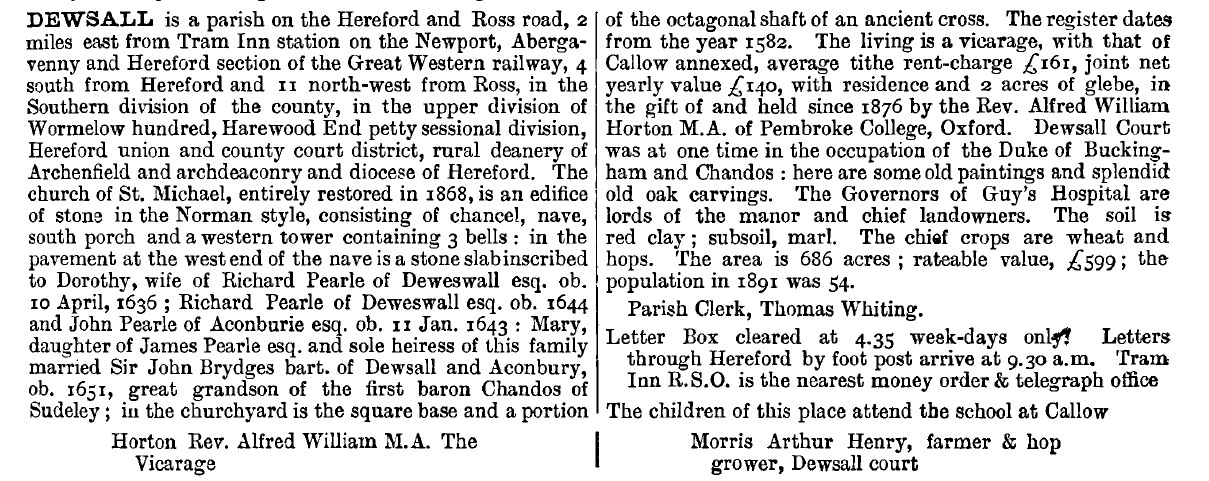
Dewsall in Kelly's Directory 1895

By the 1880s, listings put the parish in the upper division of Wormelow hundred, in the southern division of Herefordshire, the Hereford county court district, and the Harewood End petty sessional division. The ecclesiastical parish is noted as being in the rural deanery of Archenfield and archdeaconry of Hereford, with the parish register dated to 1582. The parish was still a vicarage with that of Callow annexed, which had a combined value of £200 which included £14 augmented by Queen Anne's Bounty. The church was then described as a "plain but ancient edifice", its 1868 restoration costing over £300. The earliest parish register is dated 1582. The Pearle family heiress was reported as having married Sir John Brydges bart., the great-grandson of the first baron Chandos of Sudeley. The Governors of Guy's Hospital were still lords of the manor and chief landowners. Children at Dewsall attended school in Callow parish to the north. Chief crops grown were wheat and hops. Population in 1881 was 45, in eight inhabited houses, families or separate occupiers, in a parish area of 676 acres (270 ha), which produced chiefly hops, wheat, beans, and fruit. The Governors of Guy's Hospital in London, still as lords-of-the-manor, owned nearly the whole parish. Mail was served by a parish letter box and through Hereford, with the nearest telegraph office at the Tram Inn Railway station, which, by 1890, was now on the Hereford branch and West Midland section of the Great Western railway. Dewsall was also part of the Clehonger and Much Dewchurch polling district and electoral division of the county council.

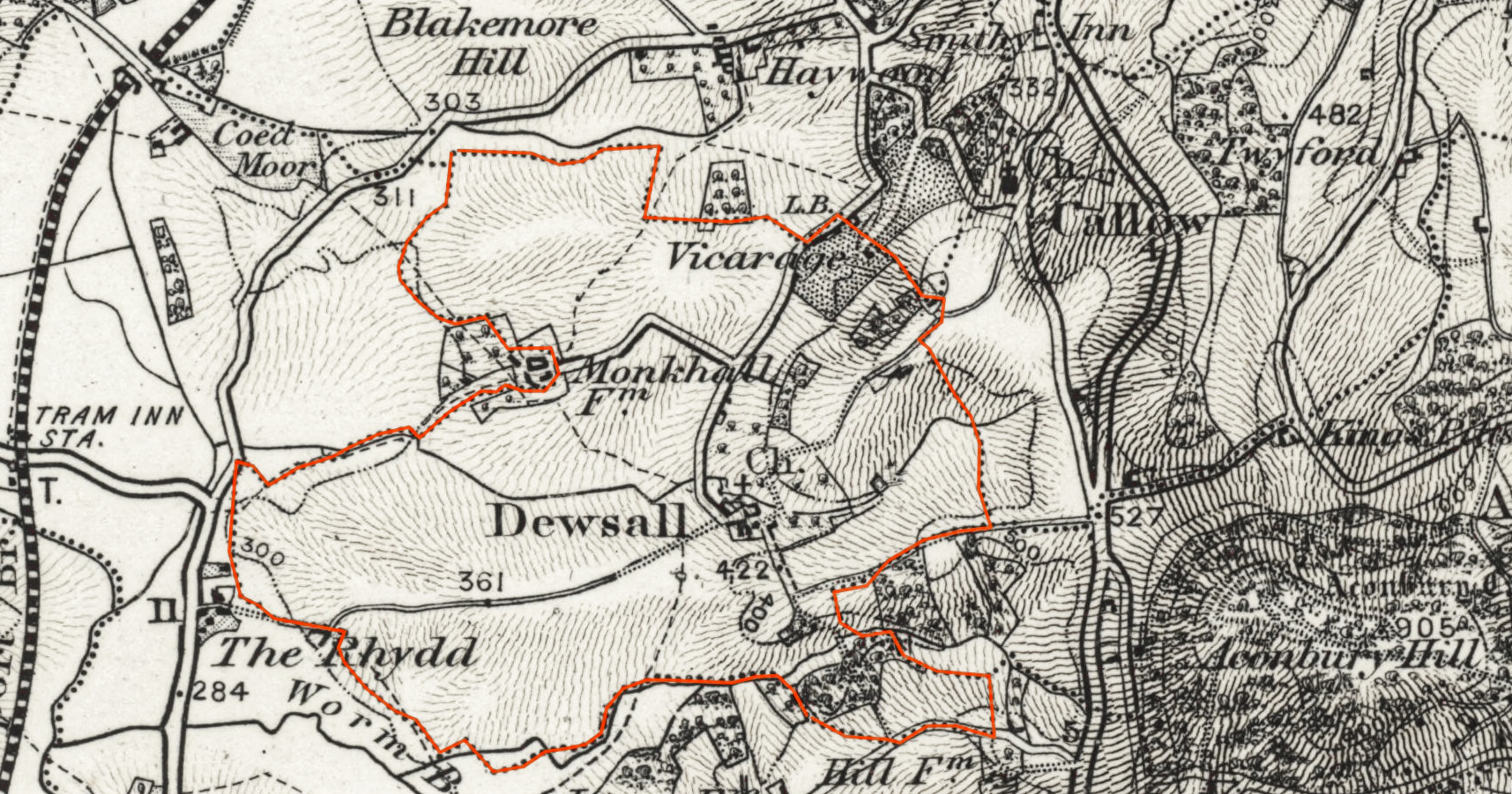
Dewsall in 1898

Population in 1891 was 54. Also by the 1890s the school for the parishes of Dewsall and Callow is described as being built by the Governors of Guy's Hospital, and opposite Callow church. Mail was processed through Hereford, which was also the post town, with letters arriving by foot. The closest money order office was then at King's Thorn in Much Birch parish; with the closest telegraph office at Tram Inn. Later in the 1890s the Tram Inn Railway Sub Office became the closest telegraph and money order office. St Michael's church is now described as "Norman", and with a pavement at the west end of the nave with leger slabs to: Dorothy, the wife to Richard Pearle of Deweswall, who died on 10 April 1636; Richard Pearle of Deweswall who died in 1644 and John Pearle of Aconbury who died 1643; and Mary, daughter to James Pearle who died 1651. Mary's inscription described that she was the sole heiress of the Pearle family, and that she married Sir John Brydges bart. of Dewsall and Aconbury, he being the great-grandson of the first baron Chandos of Sudeley. In the churchyard was noted a square base with part of the octagonal shaft of an ancient cross. A carrier—transporter of trade goods, with sometimes people, between different settlements—operated between Dewsall and Hereford on Wednesdays and Saturdays. Throughout the second half of the 19th century the only residents listed in directories were the parish vicar at the vicarage, and a Dewsall Court farmer and hop grower. Dewsall Court "was at one time" occupied by the Duke of Buckingham and Chandos. Within the house was reported "some old paintings and splendid old oak carvings". By 1911, civil parish population was 39, and the ecclesiastical parish, which included Callow, 126.

== Geography ==
Dewsall is in south Herefordshire, and approximately 4 miles (6 km) south from the city of Hereford. The nearest town is Ross-on-Wye 9 miles (14 km) to the south-east. The parish is approximately 1.2 miles (2 km) north to south, and 1.5 miles (2.4 km) east to west, with an area of 694 acres (280 ha), and an approximate height above sea level of between 295 feet (90 m) at the west and 490 feet (149 m) at the east. Adjacent parishes are Haywood at the north, Callow at the north-east, Aconbury at the east, and Much Dewchurch at the south, west and north-west.

The parish is rural, of farm complexes, fields, managed woodland and coppices, streams, ponds, isolated and dispersed businesses and residential properties, with the depopulated village and farm hamlet of Dewsall at the centre.(grid reference SO485334). Two streams flow through the parish. The first flows east to west, largely with wooded margins, through the centre of Dewsall, rising in Callow parish (grid reference SO4959433773), and winding 1,200 yards (1,097 m) to Dewsall hamlet between St Michael's church and Dewsall Court, where it broadens into a 20 yards (18 m) wide pond, from which it continues 1,300 yards (1,189 m) to the border with Much Dewchurch, eventually draining as a tributary into the River Dore in Pontrilas at the south-west. The second, Worm Brook, rises in Aconbury (grid reference SO4965432765), at the east, enters Dewsall at The Firs (wood), and flows through the wood to then form the southern border with Much Dewchurch. Beyond the parish Worm Brook joins the other parish stream. There are no main roads that run through the parish. The only through route is a minor road, entering at the north-east from Callow, and running north-east to south-west, through Dewsall hamlet to Much Dewchurch parish. A road at the south-east of the parish, Prospect Lane, provides a short border with Much Dewhurst. All other routes are bridleways, farm tracks, property entrances, and footpaths.

== Governance ==
Dewsall is represented in the lowest tier of UK governance by the six member Callow and Haywood Parish Council, which also includes the conjoined parishes of Haywood, Callow and Grafton. As Herefordshire is a unitary authority—no district council between parish and county councils—the parish is part of the Wormside ward of Herefordshire County Council. The parish is part of the Southern Area Meeting Group of the Herefordshire three-part Parish Council Area Meeting Groups. Dewsall is represent in the UK parliament as part of the Hereford & South Herefordshire constituency, held by the Conservative Party since 2010 by Jesse Norman.

In 1974 Dewsall became part of the now defunct South Herefordshire District of the county of Hereford and Worcester, instituted under the Local Government Act 1972. Until Brexit, on 31 January 2020, the parish was represented in the European Parliament as part of the West Midlands constituency.

== Community ==
Dewsall shares a village hall at and with Callow, which also provides for the parishes of Grafton and Haywood. There are no shops or amenities in the parish, while businesses include those providing tech support services, a holiday home, and wedding venue services. There is also the Hereford office for the Duchy of Cornwall. The Church of St Michael and All Angels is part of the Wormelow Hundred Benefice and the Ross-on-Wye Deanery of the Diocese of Hereford, and part of the Wormelow Hundred Benefice.

Dewsall falls under the Wye Valley NHS Trust; the closest major hospital Hereford County Hospital at Hereford. For primary education the parish falls within the catchment area of Marlbrook Primary School, and for secondary education within that of The Hereford Academy, both on the same site in Hereford, 3.5 miles (6 km) to the north.

The closest bus stops, for two routes, are outside the parish at the east, on the A49 Hereford to Ross road at the border of Callow and Aconbury; one on the Hereford to Newent, Gloucestershire route, the other the Hereford to Gloucester route. The closest rail connection is at Hereford railway station, on the Crewe to Newport Welsh Marches Line, with further connections to Oxford on the Cotswold Line, and to Birmingham provided by West Midlands Trains.

== Landmarks ==
Within Dewsall is one Grade II* and four Grade II listed buildings and structures.

The Grade II* St Michael's parish church (grid reference SO4861233494), dates largely to the 14th century with some parts possibly from the 12th. Constructed from sandstone, it comprises a 34½ ft (10.5m) long nave with an internally near continuous 20½ ft (6.25m) long chancel, both 16¼ ft (4.96m) wide, a restored 14th-century south porch, and a 19th-century weatherboarded bell turret with a shingled broach spire rising from the west end of the nave roof. The nave is buttressed at the west corners, and with a central blind doorway. At the north are two ogee and trefoil-headed windows to the nave but non to the chancel. The chancel double east window is of similar style to those of the nave, as are the two pairs of windows on the probably Saxon origin south elevation, one to the chancel, and one to the nave to the east of the porch. Between the two windows is a squared-headed, but blocked, nave window, and a blocked 14th-century priest's door to the chancel. The gabled south porch is largely contemporary to the nave and chancel, and of timber construction supported by a 20th-century shallow plinth, and four corner posts where the base parts are of more modern oak spliced into the older uprights. The side walls are restored plank boarded at the lower section, the upper parts open with three vertical stud beams and upper corner brace struts from the corner posts. On the front face are further cross braces, forming an arch, tied to a cross beam above which sits on the corner posts, and a further cross beam above. The oak gates, leaved planks on open bracing below with open hexagons above, are 19th century. The gable roof is faced with a curve-cut fascia board and roofed with tiles, the interior with open rafters and purlins. Within the porch, is a 12th- to 13-century nave doorway.

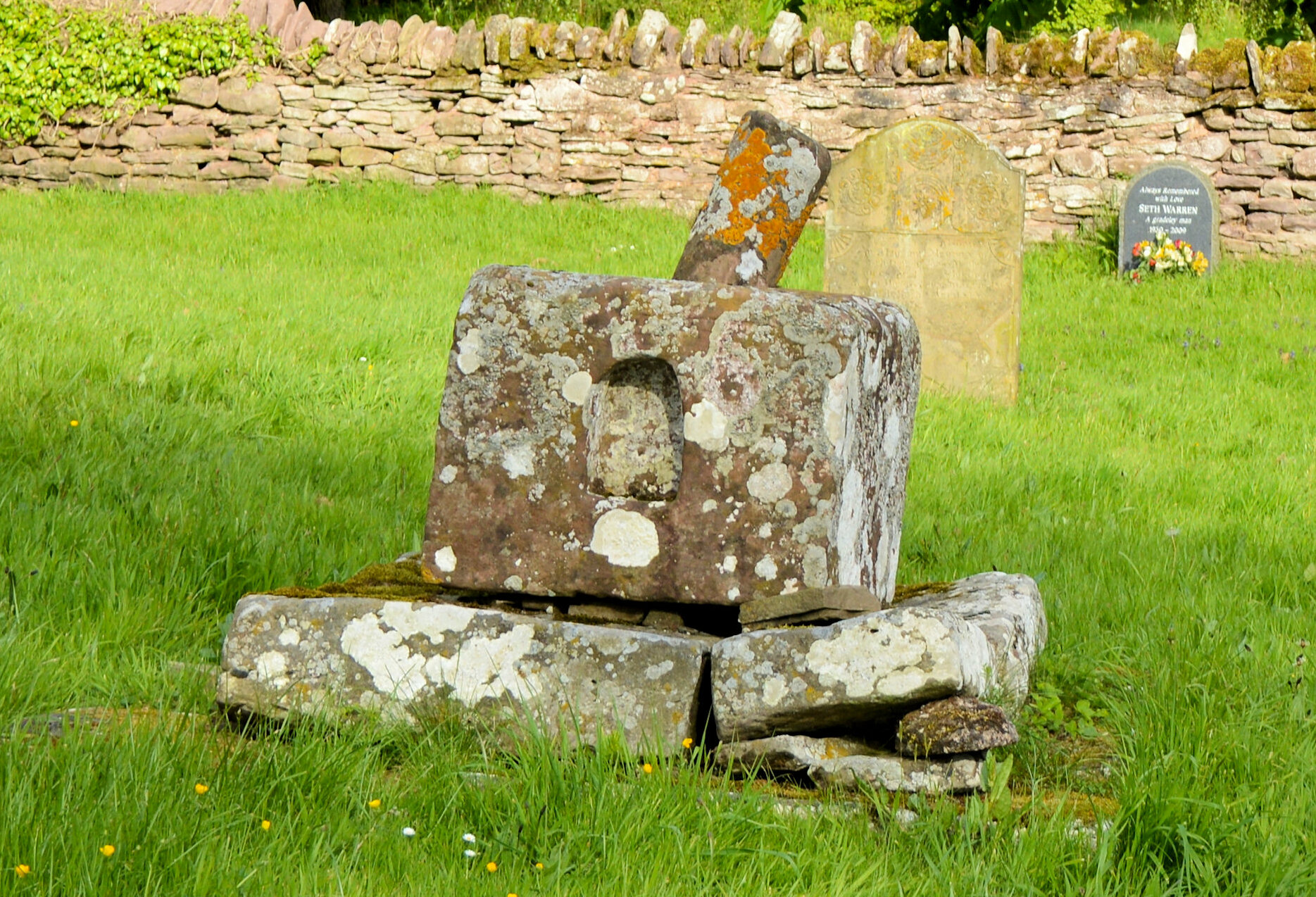
Churchyard cross

The church interior and fittings includes a font, communion table, stained glass, pulpit, harmonium, lectern, wall monuments and floor ledger slabs. The chancel 1888 east window stained glass depicts the "Marys and Angels at the sepulchre after The Resurrection", dedicated to a tenant farmer's family of Dewsall Court. The windows were designed and installed by Bristol-born Alfred Octavius Hemming (1843-1907), who trained at Edinburgh, was later a pupil of Clayton & Bell in London, then established his own company on Marylebone Road in 1883. Other windows, doorways and church fabric were subject to a substantial restoration by F. R. Kempson in 1868. The oak communion table dates to the early 17th century, although the top is a later-date restoration. Floor tiles in the chancel, dating to 1893, are by the Hereford firm, Godwin and Hewitt. Chancel monuments and memorials include that of slate and marble to Ann Skyrme (died 1835), on the north wall. On the south wall hangs a "marble plaque for Thomas and Emma Phillips, children of the then rector, who died aged 11 and 9 of scarlet fever in 1853". Thomas Phillips was the parish rector, with his wife Penelope, when his other child Benjamin died (1849), and was commemorated by a further wall plaque. There is a mahogany harmonium, provided in the late 19th century by the Estey Organ company of Brattleboro, Vermont. Nave wall monuments include one to a William Skyrme (died 1804), which combines partly black painted elements with "obelisks flanking a central column supporting an urn". Alongside is a further monument, in black, to Joyce Skyrme (died 1794), showing a weeper in base-relief resting on an urn and with the inscription: "When such friends part, tis the survivor dies". Two nave wall black and white monuments are of marble with pediment, on opposite walls, and to William Mayos and John Mayos, who both died in 1826. Nave floor slabs date to the 17th and 18th century, particularly those to Elizabeth Elfe (1706), John Pearle (1713–14), Anne Rogers and Grace Clement (1622 and 1623). The parish council describes an "association of 1693 with the future Duke of Chandos who was born at Dewsall Court". The nave font is 14th century, with circular bowl on an octagonal shaft and a square base. The pulpit is pine "with integral bookrest", and late 19th century, as is the oak lectern. There are three bells, probably dating to the early 15th century. At the exterior, to the south from the nave, is a 14th-century 'churchyard cross', essentially a 2 feet (0.6 m) square sandstone cube with the stump remains of an octagonal shaft.

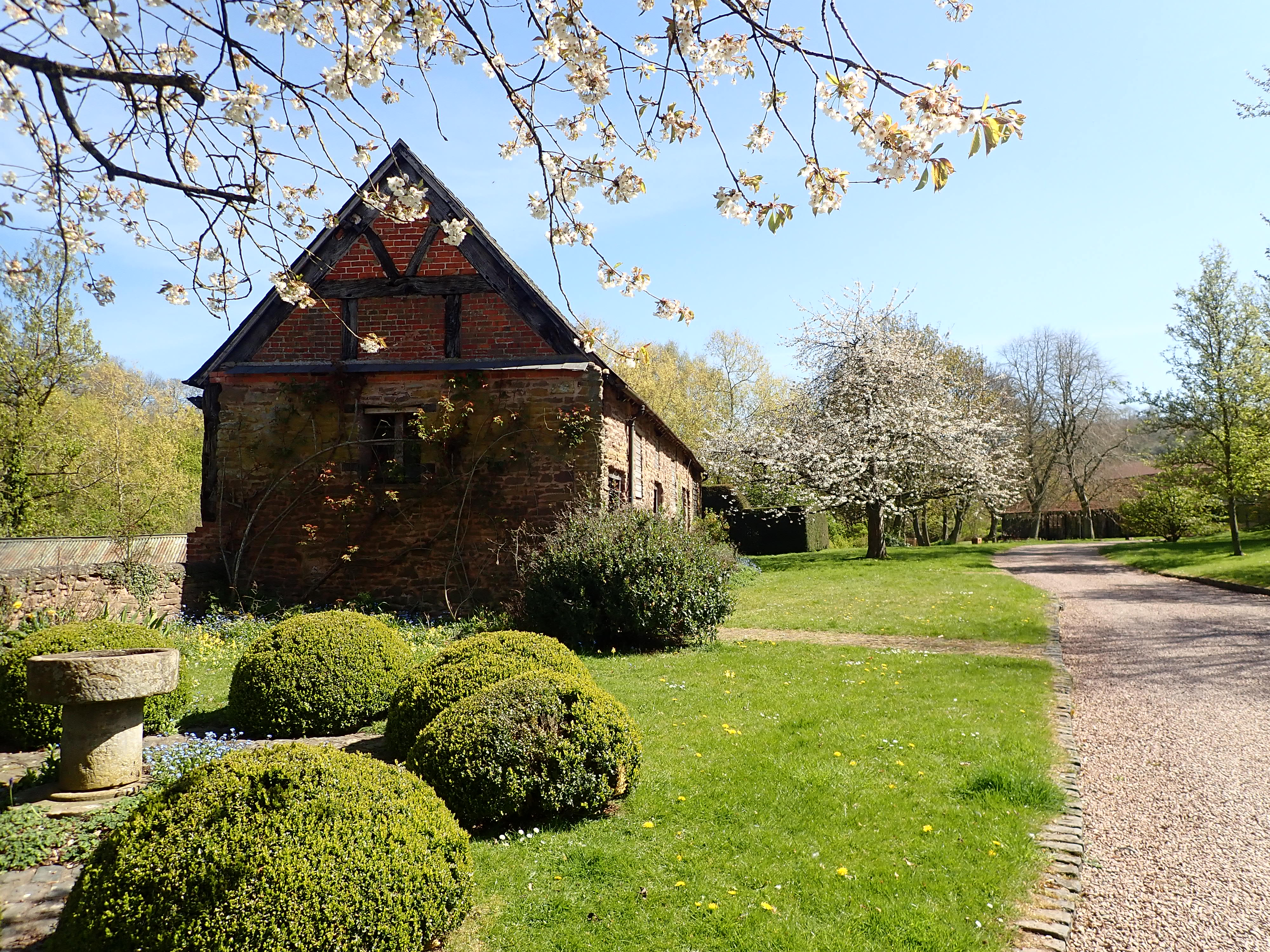
Stables at Dewsall Court

Dewsall Court (grid reference SO4862533351), at 150 yards (140 m) south from the church, is a sandstone 'H-plan' house dating to the 17th century, perhaps 1644, with additions and alterations in the 18th and 19th. The house, of three storeys and a cellar, was rebuilt entirely in stone and its present structure in the 18th century. In the 1930s some interior panelling and fireplaces were said to remain from the earlier house, however, Historic England's 1952 listing does not mention this. An oil painting of the Judgement of Paris in the manner of Peter Lely was recorded by Nikolaus Pevsner, although later being hung in the board room of Guy's Hospital, which owned the house for 300 years. A claim to notability for Dewsall Court is being the birthplace of James Brydges, 1st Duke of Chandos (1673 – 1744). At 30 yards (27 m) north-east from the house (grid reference SO4865933387), is a rectangular, five bay, gable range of one storey late 17th- to early 18th-century stables. The plinth and walls are sandstone, and part timber-framing with brick nogging, or weatherboarded.

Ark (grid reference SO4857033750), at 285 yards (300 m) north from the church, previously known as Ark Cottages and with two tenements, is a cottage dating to the 17th century with later alterations, although with a datestone below the central first floor window referencing 1769 which may apply to a restoration. Of rectangular plan, it is of part sandstone construction below timber-framing with brick infill, and of two storeys with stone tile roof, and a chimney stack at each end external to the building, of stone below and brick above. A 19th-century lean-to single storey extension of sandstone and timber framing, with a further external chimney stack and internal stone flag floor is on the shorter east side. Windows are casements, and the off-centre main entrance with a 20th-century ledged—horizontal rails to the interior—oak door. The interior has a cross wall of timber framing, the lower floor with "heavy" plain beams supporting the ceiling. The ground floor at the east has an early 17th-century panelled dado, fitted later, "in two heights, with four panels carved with conventional decoration of pomegranates, monsters, etc.; others are fluted, and two are inscribed with the monogram 'I.B.'"
