= General Arnold (disambiguation) =

General Arnold refers to Henry H. Arnold (1886–1950), American who served as General of the Army and General of the Air Force. General Arnold may also refer to:

- Abraham Arnold (1837–1901), Union Army brigadier general
- Archibald Vincent Arnold (1889–1973), U.S. Army major general
- Benedict Arnold (1740–1801), Continental Army major general who became a traitor, and thereafter a British Army brigadier general
- Brian A. Arnold (fl. 1970s–2000s), U.S. Air Force lieutenant general
- Calvert Hinton Arnold (1894–1963), U.S. Army brigadier general
- Lewis Golding Arnold (1817–1871), Union Army brigadier general
- Richard Arnold (general) (1828–1882), Union Army brigadier general
- Thomas Dickens Arnold (1798–1870), Tennessee Militia brigadier general
- William Richard Arnold (bishop) (1881–1965), U.S. Army major general
- William Howard Arnold (general) (1901–1976), U.S. Army lieutenant general
