= 18th Space Defense Squadron =

U.S. Space Force unit

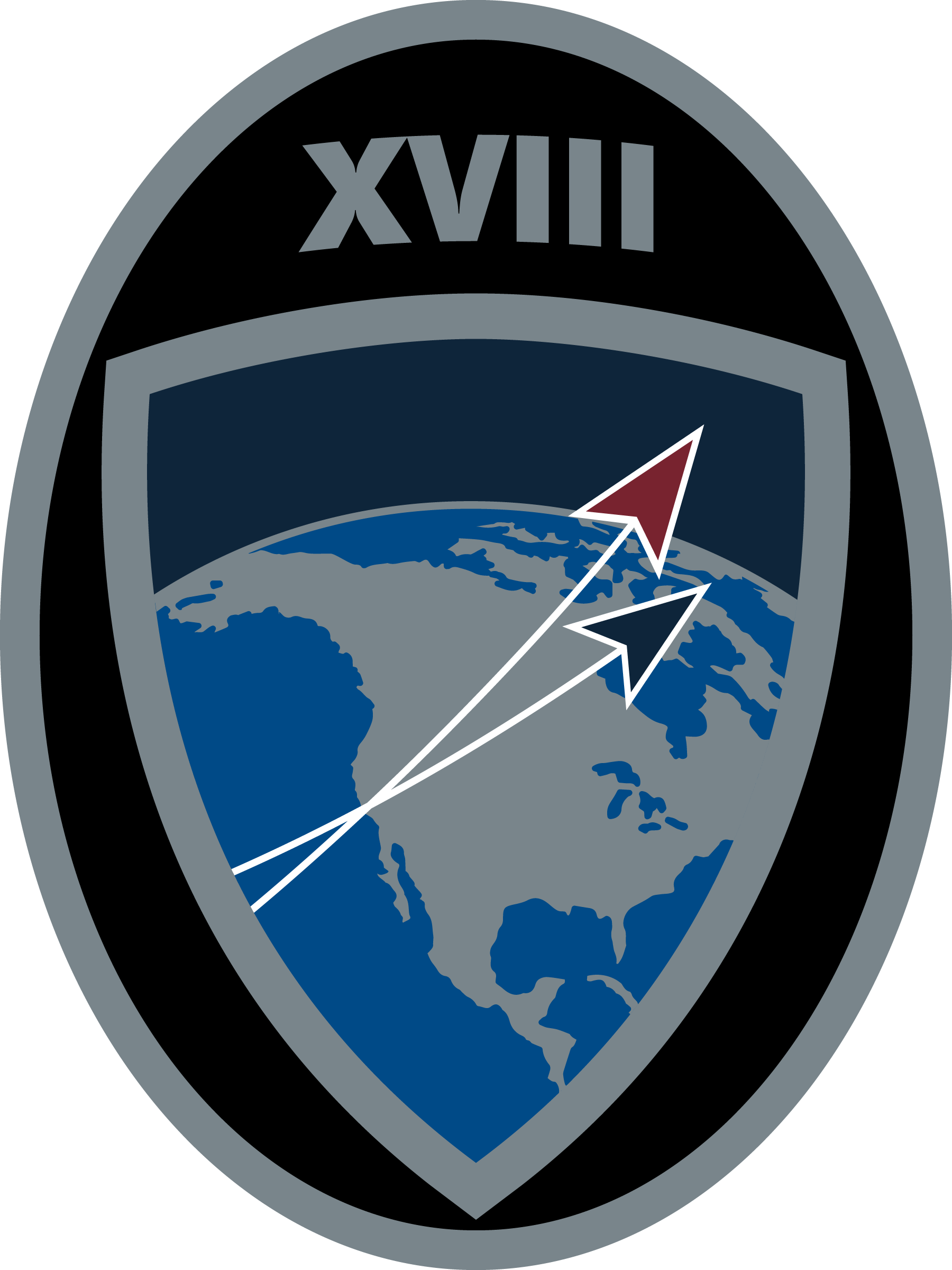
- Squadron emblem
- Active: 1966 – 1975; 1990 – 2004; 2016 – present
- Country: United States
- Branch: United States Space Force
- Type: Space domain awareness
- Role: Space surveillance
- Size: 115 military and civilian
- Part of: Space Delta 2
- Garrison/HQ: Vandenberg Space Force Base, California
- Mottos: Semper vigilans in sine alto (Latin for 'Ever Vigilant in the High Frontier'); We Find (1968-1995)
- Systems: Space Defense Operations Center (SPADOC); Astrodynamic Support Workstation (ASW)
- Decorations: Air Force Outstanding Unit Award
- Website: Official website

Commanders
- Current commander: Lt Col Laurel Jodice

Insignia
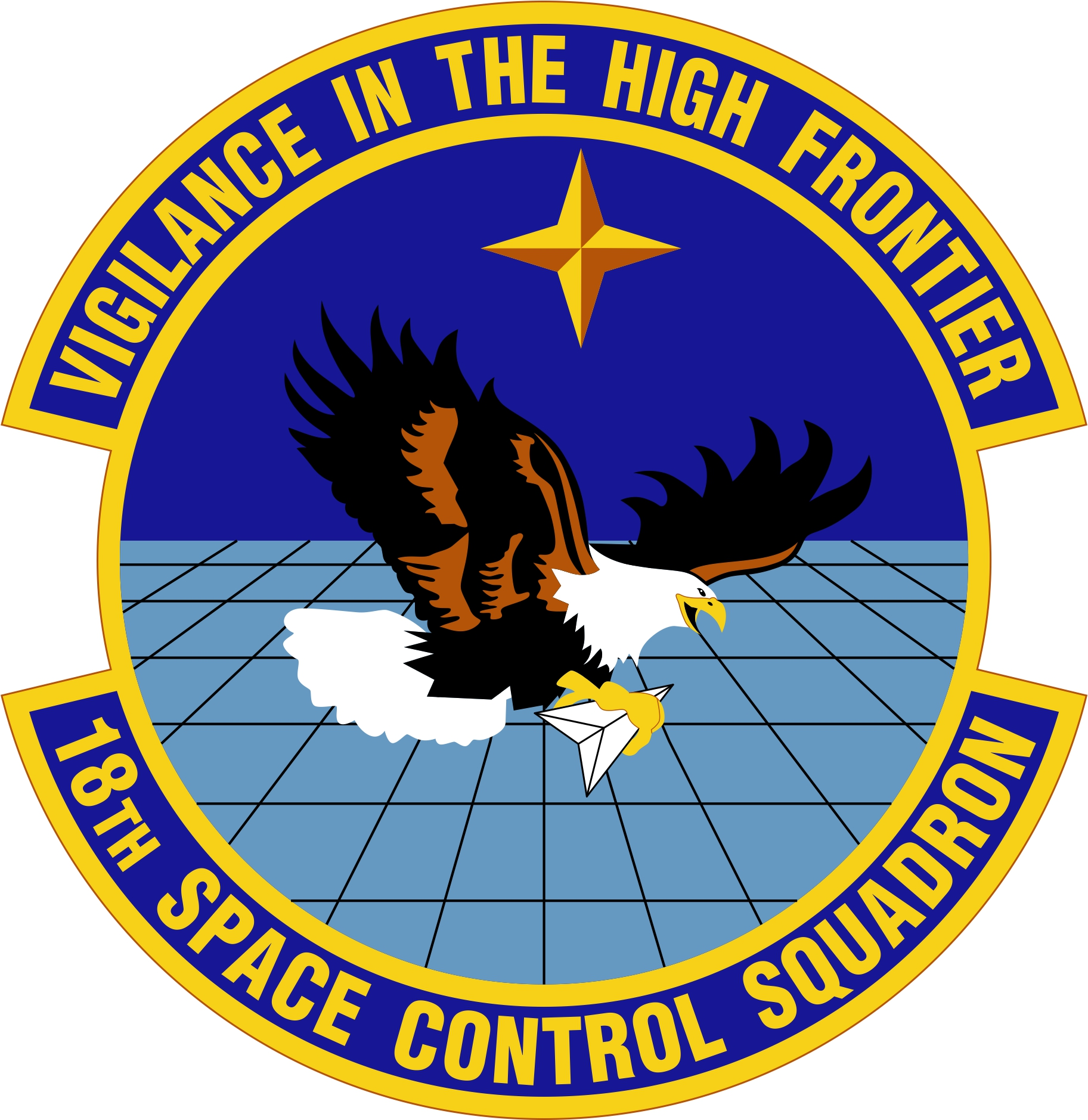
- 18th Space Control Squadron emblem (Note: Approved 18 July 1995)

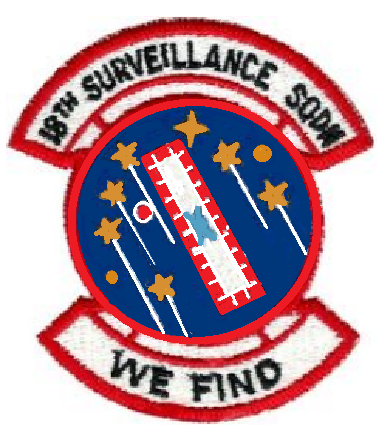
- 18th Surveillance Squadron emblem (Note: Approved 29 August 1968)

The 18th Space Defense Squadron (18 SDS) is a United States Space Force Space Domain Awareness unit located at Vandenberg Space Force Base, California. The 18th SDS is tasked with executing command and control of the space surveillance network (SSN), maintaining the resident space object (RSO) database and managing United States Space Command's space situational awareness (SSA) sharing program to United States, foreign government, commercial, and academic entities. The squadron also conducts advanced analysis, sensor optimization, conjunction assessment, human spaceflight support, reentry/break-up assessment, and launch analysis.

== Mission ==
The mission of the 18th SDS is to provide and advance a continuous, comprehensive, and combat-relevant understanding of the space situation.

The squadron processes SSN data to monitor all activity to, in, and from space, and maintains custody of all resident space objects. Primary mission functions include launch detection and tracking, conjunction assessment and collision avoidance, human spaceflight support, maneuver detection, breakup identification, and reentry assessment. These functions ultimately enhance an information advantage and enable space superiority in the defense of U.S. and allied interests. Additionally, the 18 SDS also executes U.S. Space Command's Space Situational Awareness sharing program, which provides tracking data of resident space objects to DoD, interagency, commercial, international and academic partners to:

- Promote peaceful and responsible use of space by tracking more than 45,000 man-made objects and sharing space data with the world
- Reduce uncertainty in space domain to minimize risk of misunderstanding and miscalculations

== History ==
The 18th Space Surveillance Squadron (SPSS) was the optical portion of the United States Space Force's Space Surveillance Network. They were responsible for operating four worldwide GEODSS sites, in addition to the Transportable Optical System (TOS), and the Maui Space Surveillance Complex (MSSC). The focal point for all optical command and control was centralized at the Optical Command, Control and Communications Facility (OC3F). The 18 SPSS became part of the 1st Space Wing, Air Force Space Command, on 1 February 1990.

The unit was reassigned from the 1st Space Wing to the 73d Space Group on 15 May 1992.

The 18th SPSS relocated to Edwards Air Force Base, California in July 1995. The 73rd Space Group was inactivated in May 1995 and all units were then assigned to the 21st Space Wing. With a force-wide renaming of space units, the 18th SPSS became the 18th Space Control Squadron (18 SPCS) in February 2003. This renaming did not last long, however, since the unit was inactivated in June 2004, with all detachments falling under the 21st Operations Group.

From 2004 to 2016, the space surveillance mission was executed by other USAF organizations located at Cheyenne Mountain Space Force Station in Colorado, and within the Combined Space Operations Center in California.

On 22 July 2016, the 18th Space Control Squadron was reactivated at Vandenberg Air Force Base. The squadron had a mission focused on space situational awareness in support of launches, object and debris tracking, and human spaceflight.

On 13 April 2022, the 18th Space Control Squadron was redesignated as the 18th Space Defense Squadron. The change was to signify the squadron's focus on the increasingly congested and contested space domain and their critical role in providing data and information to ensure the safety, security, and sustainability of the space environment.

== List of commanders ==
- Lt Col Juan D. Holguin Commander 18th Space Surveillance Squadron & 18th Space Control Squadron June 2002 - Jun 2004
- Lt Col T. Simpson
- Lt Col Scott G. Putnam, 22 July 2016 – July 2017
- Lt Col Mia Walsh, July 2017 – 18 June 2019
- Lt Col Justin Sorice, 18 June 2019 – ~June 2021
- Lt Col Matthew J. Lintker, June 2021 – 21 June 2023
- Lt Col Jordan O.E. Mugg, 21 June 2023 – 26 June 2025
- Lt Col Laurel Jodice, 26 June 2025 - Present

== Assignments ==
=== Combatant Command ===
- United States Space Command (29 August 2019 – present)

=== Field Command ===
- Space Operations Command (21 October 2020 – present)

=== Delta ===
- Space Delta 2 (24 July 2022 – present)

=== Major Command ===
- Air Defense Command (later Aerospace Defense Command), 1 November 1966-1 October 1975
- Air Force Space Command (1 February 1990 – 2004)

=== Numbered Air Force ===
- Fourteenth Aerospace Force (later Fourteenth Air Force, 1 February 1990 – 2004

=== Wing/Group ===
- 73d Space Group (1 July 1991 – 2004)
- 21st Space Wing
- 21st Operations Group

== Detachments ==
- 18 SPCS, Detachment 1 – Dahlgren, Virginia
- 18 SPSS, Detachment 1 – Socorro, New Mexico
- 18 SPSS, Detachment 2 – Diego Garcia, British Indian Ocean Territories
- 18 SPSS, Detachment 3 – Maui, Hawaii
- 18 SPSS, Detachment 4 – Morón Air Base, Spain June 1997 – June 2004

== Lineage ==
- Constituted as the 18th Surveillance Squadron and activated on 1 November 1966 (not organized)

Organized on 1 January 1967
Inactivated on 1 October 1975
Activated on 1 February 1990

- Redesignated 18th Space Surveillance Squadron on 15 May 1992
- Redesignated 18th Space Control Squadron on 1 March 2003

Inactivated on 1 July 2004
Activated on 22 July 2016

== Stations ==
- Edwards Air Force Base, California, 1 January 1967 – 1 October 1975
- Peterson Air Force Base, Colorado, 1 February 1990 – 1 November 1994
- Edwards AFB, California, 1 November 1994 – 1 July 2004
- Vandenberg Air Force Base (later Vandenberg Space Force Base), California, 22 July 2016 – present

== Equipment Operated ==
- Ground-based Electro Optical Deep Space Surveillance System (February 1990 – 2004)
- Baker-Nunn satellite tracking cameras (January 1967-October 1975)

== Decorations ==
- Air Force Outstanding Unit Award
  - 8 July 1970 – 7 July 1971
  - [1 Feb 1990]-31 Aug 1991
  - 18 October 1995 – 30 September 1997
  - 1 October 1997 – 30 September 1999
  - 1 January 1998 – 31 December 1998
  - 1 January 1999 – 31 December 1999
  - 1 January 2000 – 31 August 2001
