= Operation Senior Surprise =

US cruise missile strike during Gulf War

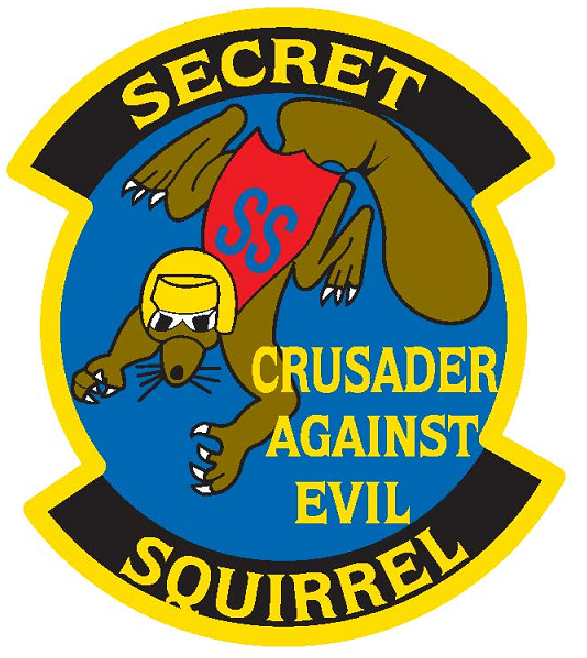
- Secret Squirrel mission patch

Operation Senior Surprise, also known as Secret Squirrel, was a long range B-52G Stratofortress cruise missile strike against Iraqi targets that initiated the bombing campaign during Desert Storm. It was given the unofficial nickname 'Operation Secret Squirrel' by the B-52 crews. The mission took place from January 16, 1991, and ended January 17, 1991. Lt. Col John "Jay" Beard, was the mission commander and Barksdale AFB's 596th Bomb Squadron's commanding officer.

== Background ==
Seven B-52 from Barksdale AFB were chosen to take part in this top secret mission to attack high priority Iraqi power and communication targets at the start of Operation Desert Storm. Each B-52G bomber was loaded with GPS guided AGM-86C conventional air-launched cruise missiles (CALCM). The cruise missiles had only recently been cleared for use with 1000-pound conventional blast fragmentation warheads.

In the early morning of January 16, 1991 the crews from the 596th Bomb Squadron, 2d Bomb Wing, got the order to take off on their non-stop bombing mission. Eight targets, including power plants at Mosul and a telephone exchange in Basra, first aerial refueling rendezvous, somewhere near the Azores.

Doom 34 called to say they had shut down an engine on takeoff due to fluctuating oil pressure. Normally, this would have been an air abort, but the crew refused to be left behind.

They made their first aerial refueling with KC-135s out of Lajes Field, Azores. The bombers pressed on to the next aerial refueling was over the Mediterranean Sea, with KC-10 tankers out of Moron AB, Spain.

Flying lights-out and in radio silence, the bombers route took them across the Mediterranean, the Red Sea, and the Arabian Desert. After entering Saudi airspace they began to arm the missiles and started their run to the launch point. Prior to the launch, about 100 miles south of the border in the far western part of Saudi Arabia, four missiles were having software problems and couldn't be launched. The crews were under strict orders not to launch any missiles with problems in case they caused collateral damage.

The launching of the remaining operative cruise missiles took ten minutes, staggered to avoid the risk of collision. The missiles headed north towards their targets. Fifteen hours had nearly passed since takeoff. The bombers turned west towards for their next refueling.

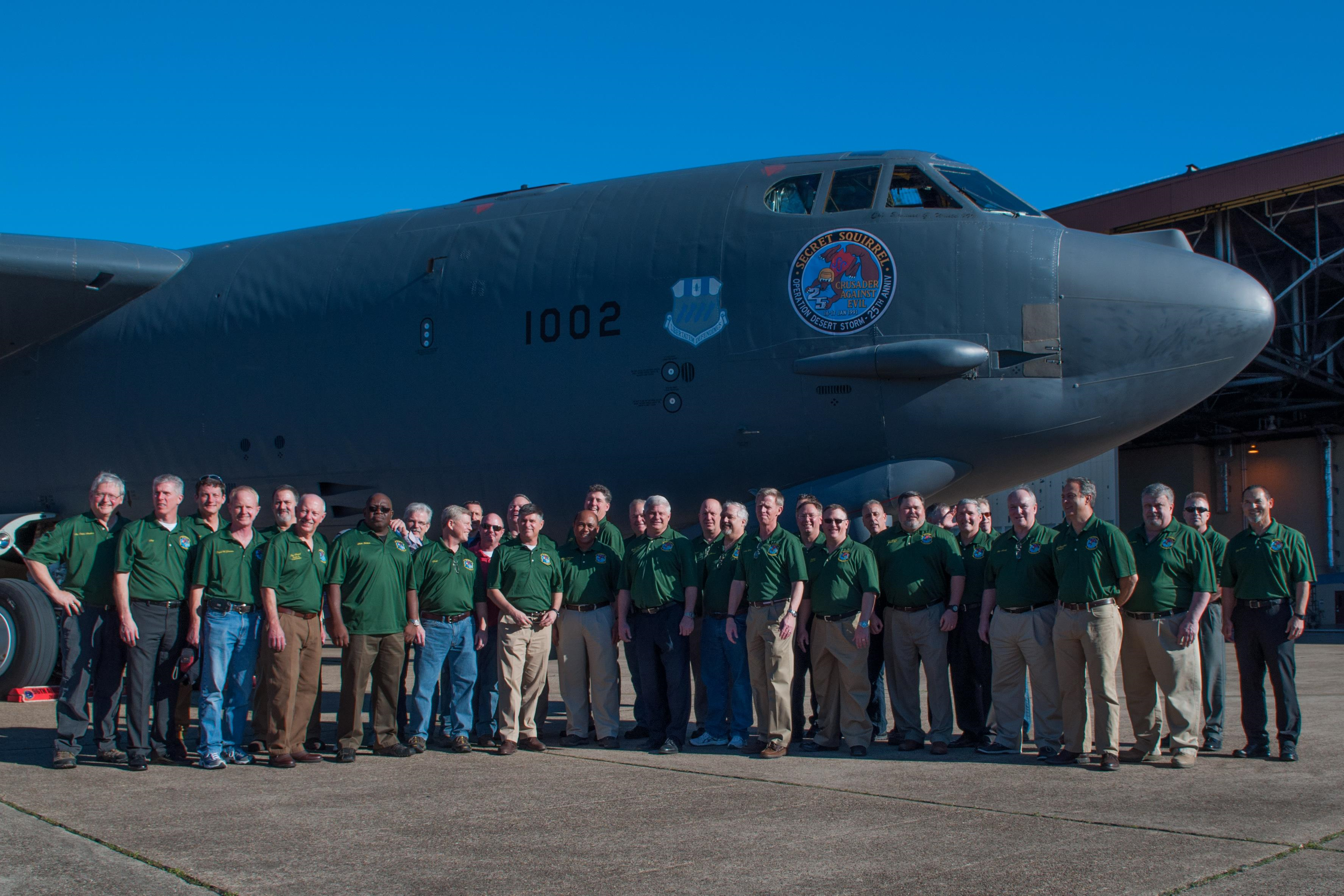
Operation Secret Squirrel aircrew members next to a B-52H with a 25th anniversary patch. Barksdale AFB, Jan. 15, 2016

The pilots experienced bad weather over the Mediterranean, with visibility just within the minimum required for safe refueling. Running low on gas, all bombers safely refueled with KC-10s out of Spain.

The fleet faced a strong headwind on the return trip and, with increased drag from those with retained missiles or seized engines, some of the aircraft required an additional refueling for the flight back to Barksdale. Two emergency KC-135 "strip tankers", from Robins AFB, Ga. were launched and refueled the B-52s low on fuel over the Atlantic.

All seven B-52 bombers returned safely after the 35 hour and 24 minute, 14,000 mile non-stop mission, thereby setting a new world record for longest bombing mission and marking the first time a GPS guided missile had been used in combat.

Operation Secret Squirrel remained classified until January 16, 1992, when crewmembers and maintainers were officially presented with commendation medals for their efforts.

== B-52G Bombers Used ==
- 57-6475 "Miami Clipper II"
- 58-0177 "Petie 3rd"
- 58-0185 "El-Lobo"
- 58-0238 "Miss Fit II"
- 58-0183 "Valkyrie"
- 59-2564 (Unnamed)
- 59-2582 "Grim Reaper II"

== Crews ==
| Bomber | Aircraft Commander | Pilot | Pilot augmentee | Radar Navigator | Navigator | Navigator Augmentee | Electronic Warfare Officer | Gunner |
|---|---|---|---|---|---|---|---|---|
| 57-6475 "Miami Clipper II" | Capt. Bernard S. Morgan | 1st Lt. Michael C. Branche | Capt. Steven E. Bass | Capt. John S. Ladner | 1st Lt. Andre J. Mouton | Maj. Wesley H. Bain | Capt. James L. Morriss III | A1C Guy W. Modling |
| 58-0177 "Petie 3rd" | Capt. Michael G. Wilson | 1st Lt. Kent R. Beck | Lt. Col. John H. Beard *Airborne mission commander | Capt. George W. Murray III | 1st Lt. Mark W. Van Doren | Capt. Lee S. Richie Jr. | Capt. Richard P. Holt | Sgt. Dale R. Jackson |
| 58-0185 "El-Lobo" | Capt. Stephen D. Sicking | 1st Lt. Russell F. Mathers | Capt. Steven W. Kirkpatrick | Capt. Floyd W. Gowans | 1st Lt. Gregory D. Moss | Maj. Frederick D. Van Wicklin | Capt. Paul M. Benson | SSgt. William I. LeClair |
| 58-0238 "Miss Fit II" | Capt. Marcus S. Myers | 1st Lt. Michael L. Hansen | Capt. Chadwick H. Barr Jr. | Capt. David J. Byrd | 1st Lt. Don E. Broyles | Capt. Don Van Slambrook | Capt. Todd H. Mathes | Sgt. Martin R. VanBuren |
| 58-0183 "Valkyrie" | Capt. Alan W. Moe | Capt. David T. Greer Jr. | Capt. Joseph M. Hasbrouck & Maj. Steven D. Weilbrenner | Capt. Blaise M. Martinick | 1st Lt. John S. Pyles | Capt. Matthew G. Casella | Capt. Tony Bothwell | Sgt. Daniel L. Parker |
| 59-2564 (Unnamed) | Capt. John P. Romano | Capt. Erik K. Hayden | Maj. Stephen E. Jackson | Capt. Stephen R. Hess | Capt. Toby L. Corey | Capt. Alan C. Teauseau | lst Lt. Robert C. Lightner | A1C Steven R. Gramling |
| 59-2582 "Grim Reaper II" | Capt. Charles E. Jones Jr. | Capt. Warren G. Ward | Maj. William H. Weller | Capt. Pat “Cruise” Hobday | 1st Lt. Aaron E. Hattabaugh | Maj. Bruce F. Blood | Capt. Kevin M. Williams | Sgt. William J. McCutchen |
