= Brian A. Arnold =

United States Air Force general

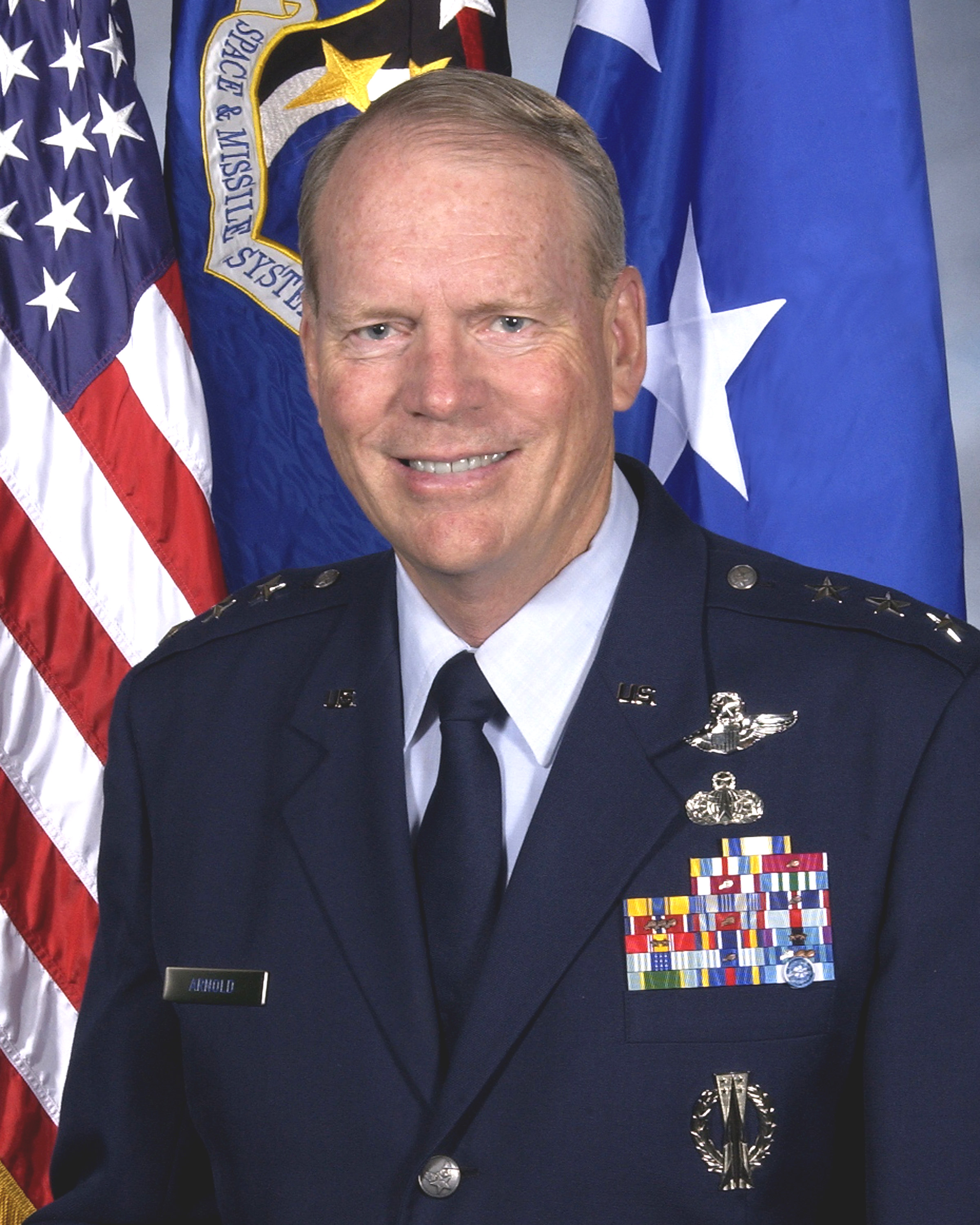
- Arnold in 2005
- Born: August 29, 1946 (age 79)
- Allegiance: United States of America
- Branch: United States Air Force
- Service years: 1971–2005
- Rank: Lieutenant General
- Commands: Space and Missile Systems Center; Air Force Officer Accession and Training Schools; Air Force Reserve Officer Training Corps; Squadron Officer School; United States Forces Azores; 65th Air Base Wing

Brian A. Arnold (born August 29, 1946) is a former lieutenant general in the United States Air Force.

== Career ==
Arnold was commissioned at Lackland Air Force Base in 1971. The following year, he underwent pilot training at Webb Air Force Base and the year after that, Boeing B-52 Stratofortress combat crew training at Castle Air Force Base. Afterwards, he was assigned to the 644th Bomb Squadron at K. I. Sawyer Air Force Base.

From 1974 to 1978, Arnold was an instructor pilot and flight examiner with the 60th Bombardment Squadron at Andersen Air Force Base. He then became a section commander and lecturer at Squadron Officer School and Executive Officer to the Commandant at the Air War College.

In 1981, Arnold was assigned as a General Dynamics F-111 Aardvark pilot to the 393d Bomb Squadron at Pease Air Force Base. The following year, he was assigned to the Office of the Assistant Secretary of the Air Force (Acquisition). After a time as F-111A Commander with the 528th Bomb Squadron at Plattsburgh Air Force Base, Arnold re-joined the Office of the Assistant Secretary of the Air Force (Acquisition) as a monitor of the Northrop Grumman B-2 Spirit program in 1989.

From 1992 to 1993, Arnold was deputy director of power projection requirements of Air Combat Command. That year, he assumed command of U.S. Forces Azores and the 65th Air Base Wing. Arnold was then in command of Squadron Officer School from 1995 to 1996, the Air Force Reserve Officer Training Corps from 1996 to 1997 and the Air Force Officer Accession and Training Schools in 1997.

After serving as director of requirements of Air Force Space Command, Arnold again returned to the Office of the Assistant Secretary of the Air Force (Acquisitions) as director of space and nuclear deterrence in 1999. In 2001, Arnold was commander of the Space and Missile Systems Center of Air Force Materiel Command before assuming the same position at Air Force Space Command.

Arnold retired from the Air Force in 2005. He then joined Raytheon as vice president and general manager of space systems.

Awards he received during his military career include the Air Force Distinguished Service Medal, the Defense Superior Service Medal, the Legion of Merit with oak leaf cluster, the Meritorious Service Medal with silver oak leaf cluster, the Joint Service Commendation Medal, the Air Force Commendation Medal, the Air Force Achievement Medal, the Outstanding Unit Award with two oak leaf clusters, the Combat Readiness Medal with oak leaf cluster, the National Defense Service Medal with two service stars, the Global War on Terrorism Service Medal and the Humanitarian Service Medal with two service stars.

== Education ==
- California State University at Hayward- BS in education (1968)
- Pepperdine University- MS degree in administrative education (1976)
- Squadron Officer School (1977)
- Air Command and Staff College (1985)
- National War College (1992)
- Harvard University- Program for Senior Officials in National Security (1995)
