= 496th Air Base Squadron =

496th Air Base Squadron

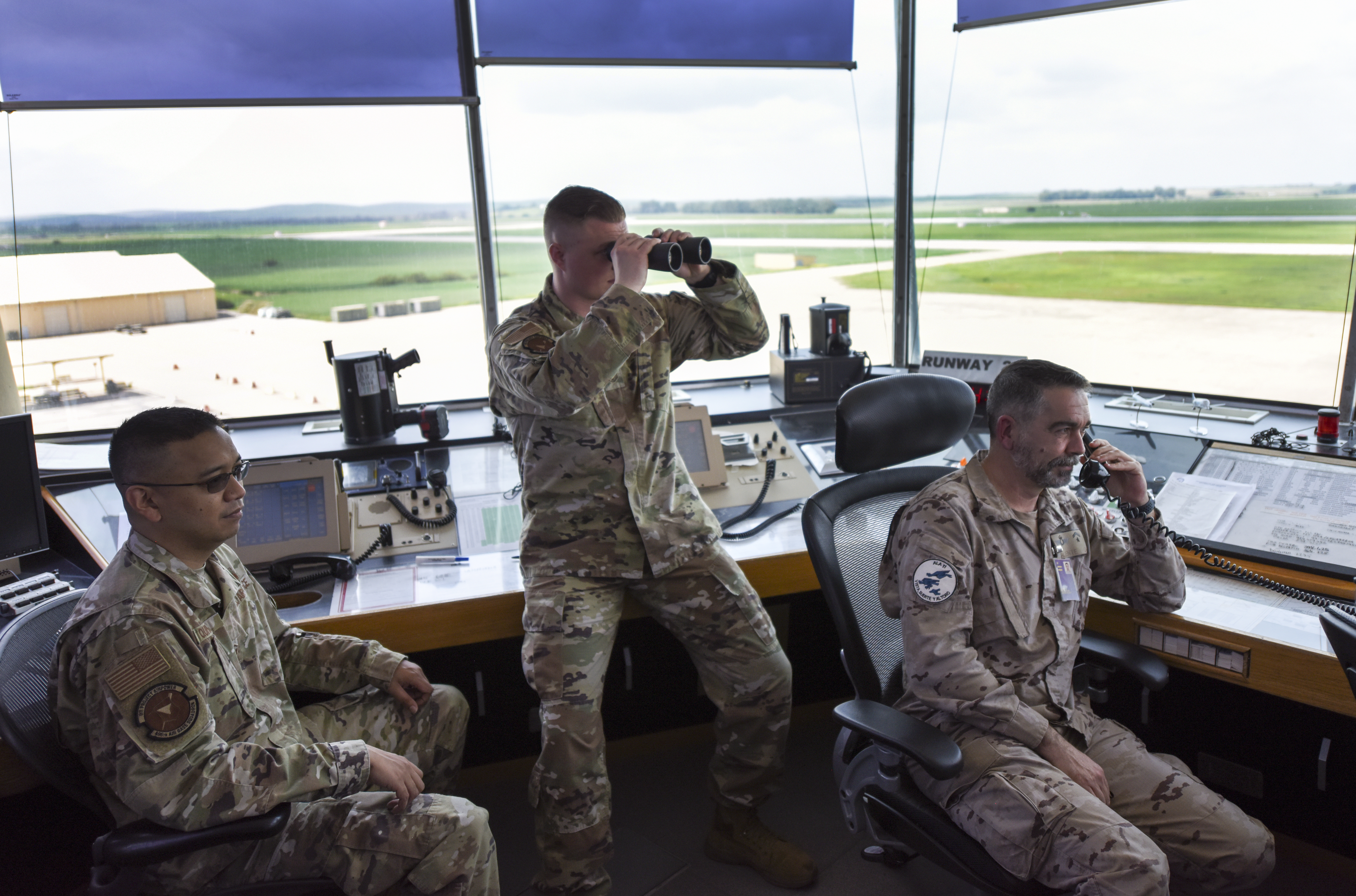
- 496th ABS air traffic controllers in the control tower at Morón Air Base
- Active: 1976–present
- Country: United States
- Branch: United States Air Force
- Type: Base Operations-Support Integration
- Role: Power Projection
- Part of: United States Air Forces in Europe – Air Forces Africa: Third Air Force; 86th Airlift Wing; 65th Air Base Group
- Garrison/HQ: Morón Air Base, Spain
- Nickname: Matadors
- Motto: We Project Airpower
- Website: https://www.ramstein.af.mil/

Commanders
- Current commander: Lt Col Mark D. Nexon

Insignia
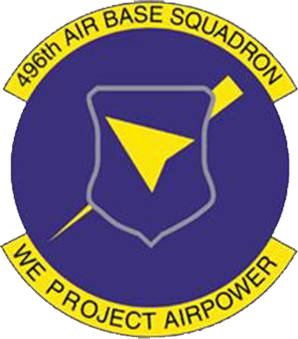
- 496th Air Base Squadron emblem (Approved 17 October 1994)

The 496th Air Base Squadron (496 ABS) is a United States Air Force Geographically Separated Unit (GSU), stationed on the Spanish Air and Space Force (SASF) installation of Morón Air Base, Spain. The 496 ABS is part of the 65th Air Base Group, Lajes Field, Portugal, under the 86th Airlift Wing, Ramstein Air Base, Germany.

== Overview ==
The Squadron is a direct liaison between the 86th Airlift Wing and Spanish 11th Fighter Wing (Ala 11, Ejercito del Aire). The 496 ABS is responsible for all U.S. reception and power projection operations (with direct authorization & coordination from SpAF Base leadership).

The Base Operations Support - Integration is responsible for all U.S. personnel deployed or operating on Morón Air Base. Currently, the base supports 850 Special Purpose Marine Ground Task Force Crisis Response - Africa personnel while partnering with the Spanish Air Force's 11th Wing, Unidad Militar de Emergencias, the Second Air Deployment Support Squadron, and additional transient operations .

The 496 ABS is continually postured to receive forces in support of UN, NATO, and US contingency and exercise operations.

== History ==
On 1 June 1957, the 3973rd Air Base Group at Morón Air Base was formally activated as part of Sixteenth Air Force assigned to the Strategic Air Command (SAC).

In February 1976, congressional action known as the "Nunn Amendment" identified reductions and realignments, and contracting of most military authorizations at Morón Air Base. Office of the Secretary of Defense (OSD) approval followed in April 1976, and USAFE was directed to implement these reductions. Operation Location-A, 401 TFW was established on 1 June 1976. Further reorganization took place when OL-A, 401 TFW was discontinued on 31 July 1976, and Detachment 2, 401 TFW was established on 1 August 1976. The 496th ABS traces its origins to Detachment 2, 401st TFW.

USAFE/XP letter dated 16 August 1976, Subject: Program Guidance Letter Morón Air Base Standby Deployment Base (SDB), implemented reduction actions and expansion of the Base Maintenance Contract (BMC) to include Civil Engineering, Services, Transportation, Supply, Housing Supply, Fuels, AGE Maintenance, Fire Protection and Administration.

In September 1976, the Treaty of Friendship and Cooperation between Spain and the United States became effective and reconfirmed the standby status of Morón Air Base. By September 1977, all phase down actions were completed and the base military, civilian, contractor and tenant population stabilized at 400, consisting of more than 300 contractor personnel and approximately 30 Det 2, 401 TFW personnel.

On 1 November 1989, Det. 2, 401st TFW, became the 7120th Air Base Flight under Sixteenth Air Force. On 1 June 1993, the 7120th Air Base Flight was re-designated as the 712th Air Base Flight.

The 1994 military reductions in Europe resulted in Morón Air Base picking up a regional responsibility for providing support to designated USAF units in Spain, Italy, and Greece with the draw-down of USAFE units at Torrejon AB, Spain, San Vito AS, Italy and Iraklion AS, Greece. Along with the increased responsibility came a new unit designation. The 712th Air Base Flight became the 496th Air Base Squadron on 1 July 1994, under the newly formed 616th Regional Support Group located at Aviano Air Base, Italy.

Since January 2000, Morón's mission has matured to make the base a critical link in supporting the rotation of Aerospace Expeditionary Forces (AEF) -- deployed in EUCOM and CENTCOM Areas of Responsibilities. Tanker Task Forces (KC-135 and KC-10), Fighter Units from the Air Force and Marine Corps, and airlifters (C-141, C-17 and C-5s) use Morón as a staging base for AEF operations. The base also frequently welcomes rotating US Army personnel. Morón staffing swells during these operations with temporary duty personnel (known as Expeditionary Combat Support) supplementing the contract, civilian and active-duty personnel.

On 1 April 2019 the squadron realigned from under the 86th Operations Group, Ramstein Air Base, Germany, to the 65th Air Base Group, Lajes Field, Portugal.
