= Morón Air Base =

Spanish Air and Space Force base near Morón de la Frontera, Seville, Spain

- Base Aérea de Morón
- Near Morón de la Frontera, Arahal, Seville in Spain
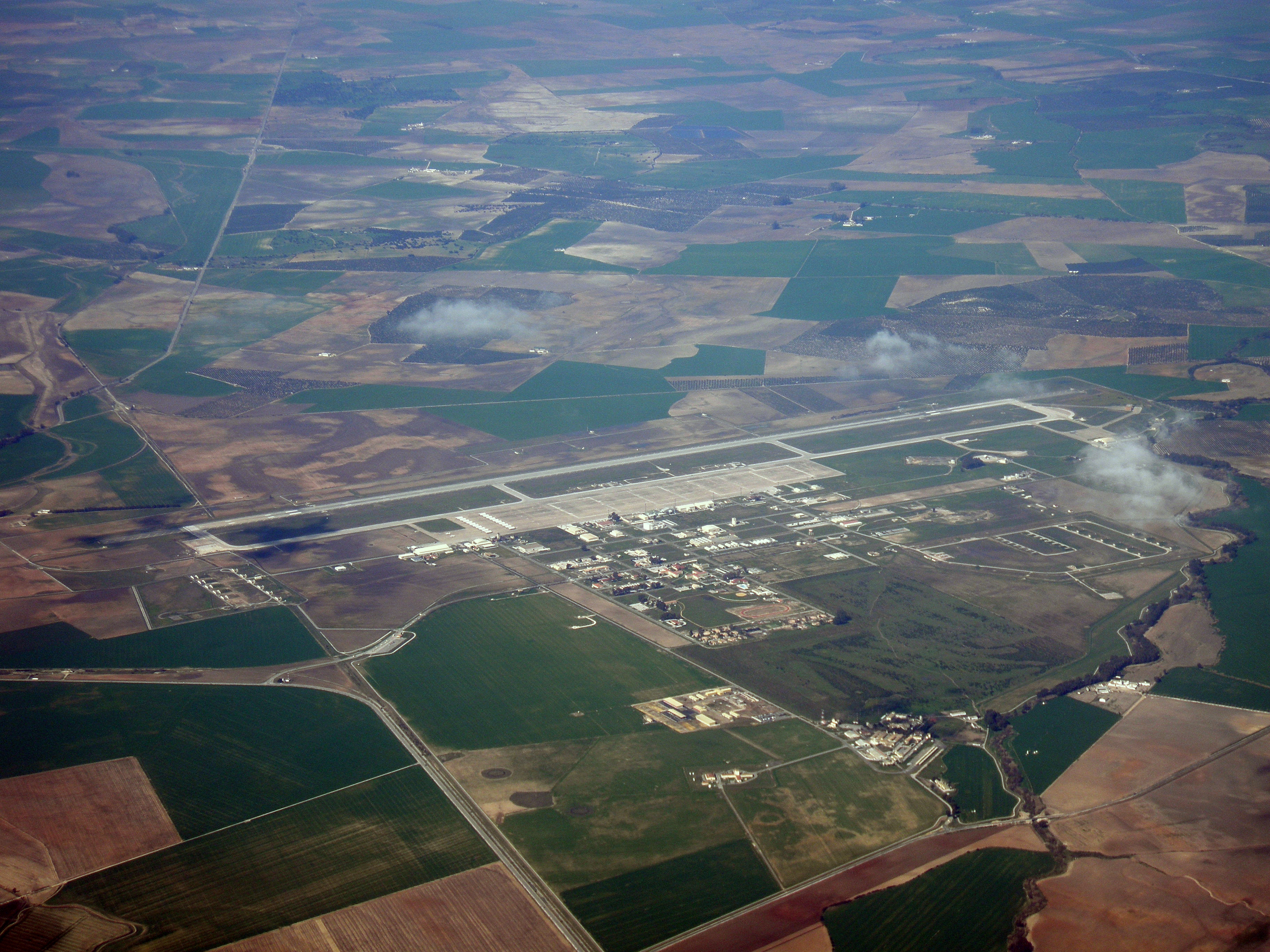
- Aerial view of Morón Air Base during 2009.

Site information
- Type: Military airfield
- Owner: Ministry of Defence
- Operator: Spanish Air and Space Force; United States Air Force
- Controlled by: Combat Air Command; US Air Forces in Europe – Air Forces Africa (USAFE-AFAFRICA)
- Condition: Operational

Location
- Shown within Spain
- Coordinates: 37°10′29″N 05°36′57″W

Site history
- Built: 1940
- In use: 1941 – present

Garrison information
- Garrison: 11th Wing
- Occupants: 113 Squadron; 221 Squadron; 496th Air Base Squadron (USAF)

Airfield information
- Identifiers: IATA: OZP, ICAO: LEMO, WMO: 083970
- Elevation: 87 metres (285 ft) AMSL
Runways
Direction	Length and surface
02/20	3,597 metres (11,801 ft) Asphalt

Morón Air Base (IATA: OZP, ICAO: LEMO) is a Spanish air base, located at 37°10′N 5°36′W in southern Spain, approximately 35 miles (56 km) southeast of the city of Seville. The base gets its name from the nearby town of Morón de la Frontera, while it is located inside the municipality of Arahal. The base is shared by United States and Spanish forces, but the base is under Spanish command and only the Spanish flag and command insignia are flown.

Currently the base is home to Ala 11, a fighter wing of Eurofighter Typhoons of the Spanish Air and Space Force.

== History ==
=== Origins ===
Construction on the Vázquez Sagastizábal Military Aerodrome, as Morón Air Base was initially known, began in 1940. The following year it began to function as a military airfield and was utilised to train fighter pilots for the Spanish Army Air Force.

In 1953, the Spanish and American governments finalized agreements to establish a number of Spanish-American air bases, including Morón Air Base. Morón was one of three major United States Air Force (USAF) Cold War airbases in Spain, the others being Zaragoza Air Base near Zaragoza and Torrejón Air Base near Madrid. Construction efforts began in 1953 under the direction of the United States Navy, taking over 3 years to complete.

On May 13, 1958, the first flight of Boeing B-47 Stratojets were assigned to Morón Air Base to conduct Reflex operations and then Boeing KC-97 Stratofreighters arrived to conduct strip alert tanker missions, and six weeks later the first rotational fighter squadron, the 1st Fighter-Day Squadron, flying North American F-100 Super Sabres and commanded by Lt. Col. Chuck Yeager, arrived from George Air Force Base, CA, for temporary duty to conduct air defence alert.

Morón continued to operate primarily as a Reflex base until 1962, when the first Boeing KC-135 Stratotanker aircraft arrived. In 1966, the base was transferred from Strategic Air Command (SAC) to United States Air Forces Europe (USAFE). The mission changed to communications support, temporary duty (TDY) "fair weather" flying operations for McDonnell Douglas RF-4C Phantom IIs from RAF Alconbury, and McDonnell RF-101 Voodoo from RAF Upper Heyford, United Kingdom and the support of air rescue operations provided by the 67th Aerospace Rescue and Recovery Squadron.

=== Drawdown ===
In 1969, Morón Air Base was designated to a "modified caretaker status", and Torrejón Air Base was designated as the Primary Support Base (PSB) for the Spanish Air Force. A small Spanish Air Force contingent of F-5 Freedom Fighters used the air base during the 1980s. Most of its buildings were empty and on-base services were severely limited.

In November 1983, during the joint Spanish-American military exercise CRISEX 83, U.S. Air Force B-52 strategic bombers were allowed to enter Spanish air space and use Morón Air Base for the first time since being banned after the 1966 Palomares B-52 crash on January 17, 1966, near Palomares.

In 1984, Morón became a NASA Space Shuttle Transoceanic Abort Landing (TAL) site. Special navigation and landing aids were installed, and Spanish personnel were trained to recover the Space Shuttle orbiter after an emergency landing—one that never came. In addition during the 1980 and 1990s, U.S. Air Force airmen deployed to Morón during Shuttle launching periods to help provide onsite weather reporting as well as crash/rescue capability.

=== Post Cold War ===
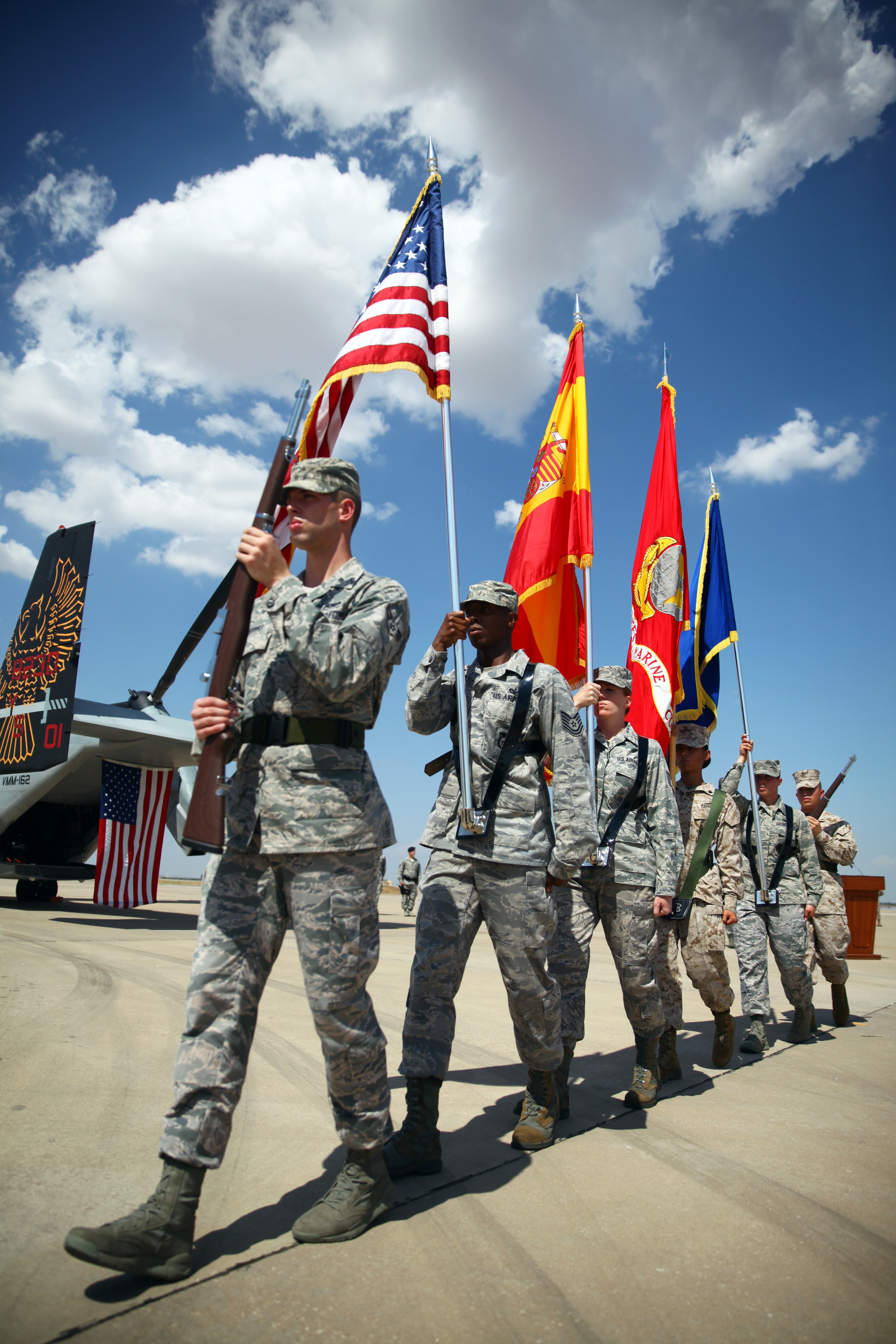
U.S. Marines with Special Purpose Marine Air-Ground Task Force Crisis Response and Airmen with the 496th Air Base Squadron participate in a 9/11 remembrance ceremony at Morón Air Base, Spain, Sept. 11, 2013.

In 1990, Strategic Air Command deployed 22 KC-135 and McDonnell Douglas KC-10 Extender tankers to provide aerial refueling for Operation Desert Shield and changed Morón Air Base's U.S. function from refueling to bomber operations. The 801st Bomb Wing (Provisional) at Morón Air Base consisted of 24 Boeing B-52 Stratofortress, 3 KC-135s and over 2,800 personnel. This was the largest deployed bomber wing during the war.

In 1991, the basing plan for Spain called for retaining Morón AB, along with Torrejón Air Base, and Naval Station Rota, but on a drastically reduced scale. In 1995, the 496th Air Base Squadron (496th ABS) was activated to replace the 712th Air Base Flight, and USAFE redesignated Morón as a limited-use base, defined as austerely staffed with no permanently assigned operational tactical forces, although it was used as a staging base to support deployments.

Moron was used heavily during the Gulf War by B-52s and tankers, and also during Operation Restore Hope and Operation Allied Force. From 1995 to 1997, Morón was a popular staging area to host Coronet East movements to and from Turkey and Southwest Asia with over 95 fighter and tanker missions. In 1996, the 496th was placed under the 31st Support Group of Aviano Air Base, Italy.

In 1999, Morón became the home of the 92nd Air Expeditionary Wing – tasked with providing fuel to Operation Allied Force of the Kosovo War. In addition to serving as the HQ 92 AEW (serving units in France, Crete, Sicily and Spain), Morón hosted 37 tankers (KC-135 and KC-10) and 800 personnel. The 92 AEW became the largest Tanker Wing since the Vietnam War and held the distinction of being the largest tanker base during the Kosovo war.

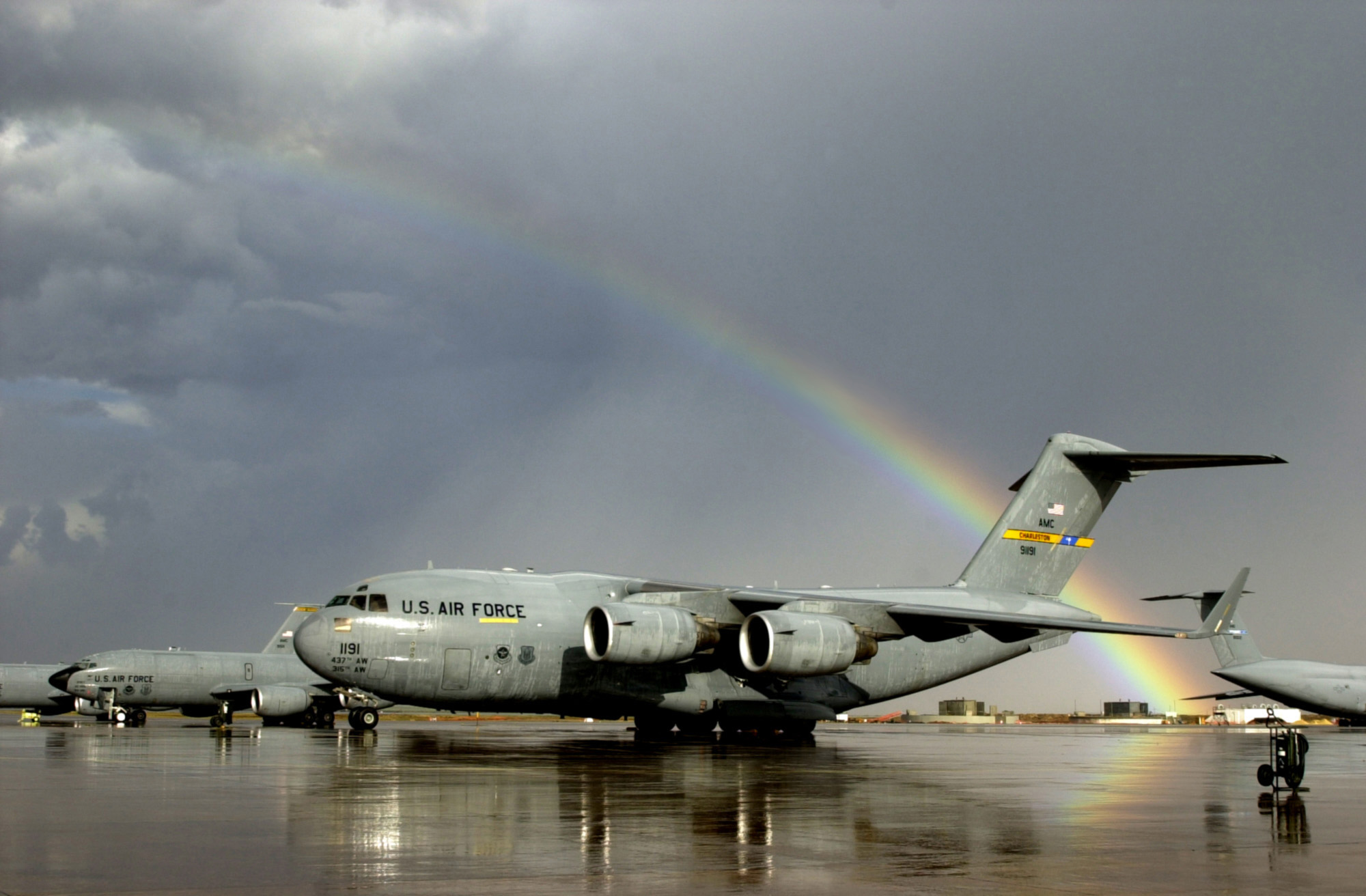
C-17s at Morón AB during Operation Enduring Freedom

In 2001, the base provided record numbers of airlift and fighter rotations for Operation Enduring Freedom in Afghanistan. In 2003, these operations increased as Morón became key for airlift and fighter deployments in support of Operation Iraqi Freedom. In 2004, the 496th ABS started reporting to the 712th Air Base Group and was realigned under the 38th Combat Support Wing of Ramstein Air Base, Germany later that year. In 2007, the 712th ABG inactivated and the 496th ABS was realigned again under the 86th Operations Group of Ramstein Air Base. In April 2019 the 496th ABS was realigned again under the 65th Air Base Group creating the Atlantic Air Bridge.

In 2011, the base once again proved its strategic importance as it served as the main tanker base for tanker aircraft supporting Operation Unified Protector in operations over Libya. The 313th Air Expeditionary Wing ("Calico Wing") and 406th Air Expeditionary Wing were activated to manage these operations. In 2013, Marine Corps temporarily based 550 Marines as part of a rapid reaction force in Morón, Spain in support of U.S. Africa Command. This unit was outfitted with Bell Boeing MV-22B Ospreys and Lockheed Martin KC-130J aerial refueling / cargo aircraft. An advance element from this unit moved to Naval Air Station Sigonella in May.

Morón's massive flight line, in-ground aircraft refueling system, long runway and prime location on the Iberian Peninsula, close to the Mediterranean and the Middle East, means the base is an important link in any operation moving east from the United States.

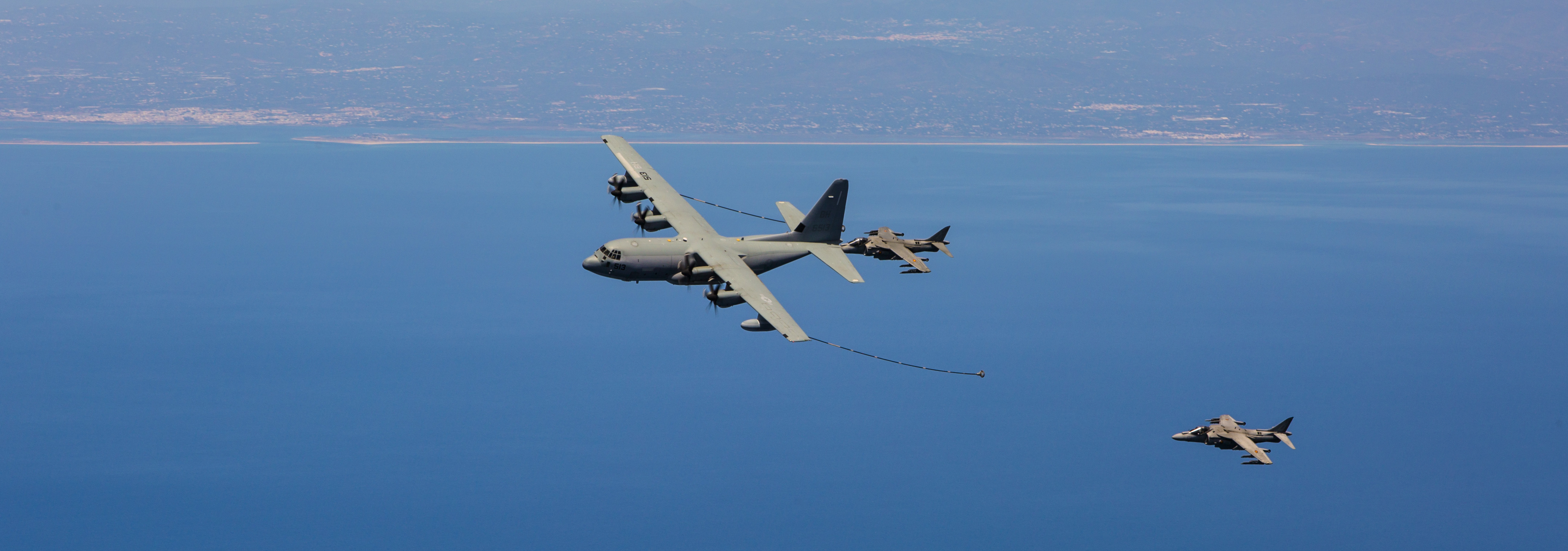
US Marines KC-130 refueling AV-8 Harrier of the Spanish Navy near Morón Air Base

In May 2015 the Spanish government approved an agreement granting the U.S. military a permanent presence on the base. Under the agreement, up to 3,000 American troops and civilians of the Special Purpose Marine Air-Ground Task Force - Crisis Response - Africa can be stationed there, while the number of aircraft can be increased to 40, up from the previous limit of 14.

At present the base hosts:

- Wing (Ala) 11 of the Spanish Air and Space Force, which is equipped with Eurofighter Typhoon;
- El 2.º Escuadrón de Apoyo al Despliegue Aéreo (SEADA);
- Permanent Detachment of Servicio de Vigilancia Aduanera, which operate Ala 37;
- El 2.º Emergency Intervention Battalion of the Unidad Militar de Emergencias (UME- BIEM II);
- 496th Air Base Squadron, USAF

A detachment of the 18th Space Surveillance Squadron (USAF) was also previously located at the base.

The U.S. military is planning to revamp Moron Air Base, including creating new parking spaces for as many as nine additional B-52 Stratofortress strategic bombers.

== Local Base Operations ==
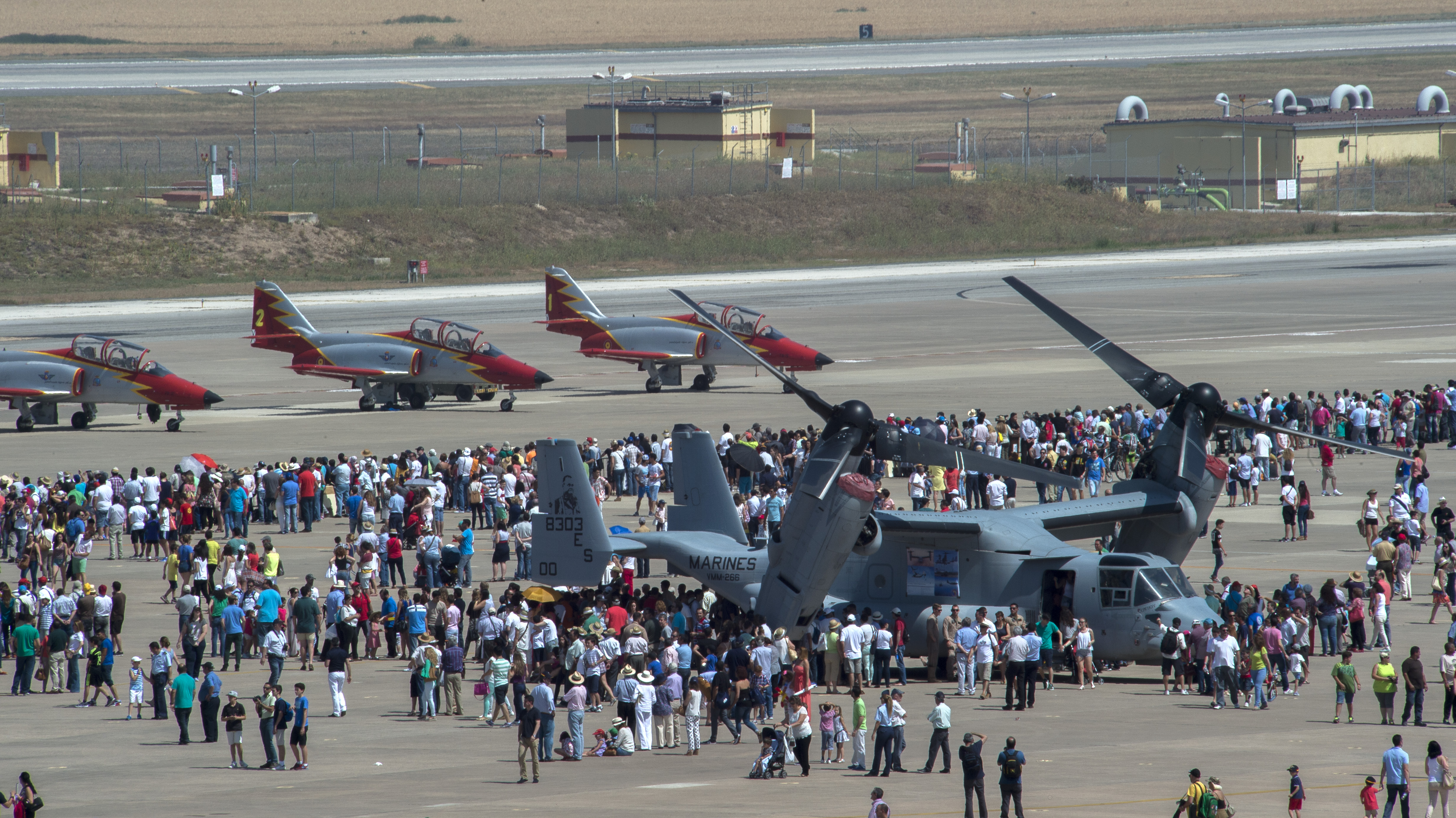
Citizens visiting the base at the 2015 Morón Air Base Open House. In the foreground a U.S. V-22 Osprey and in the background three CASA C-101 of the Spanish Patrulla Águila ("Eagle Patrol").

The base is run under the Turkey Spain Base Maintenance Contract (TSBMC). Specific services include the fueling of US Air Force planes, Fire Fighting, Dining Facility (Food Services), Occupational Health, Ambulance Services, Communications, Postal Services, Safety, Civil Engineering, Lodging, Library, Fitness Center Equipment Maintenance, & Life Guard/Pool Services), Logistics Support Services, Contingency/Exercise Support, and limited support of the Zaragoza Air Base controlled by the Spanish Air Force. The contract does not cover local base security, MWR, and pastoral care.

The contract has historically been awarded for a period of four year intervals; however, the current contract, held by Kellogg Brown & Root (KBR) —known as Turkey-Spain Base Maintenance Contract (TSBMC)-and combines USAFE operations in Turkey and Spain.

== Based units ==
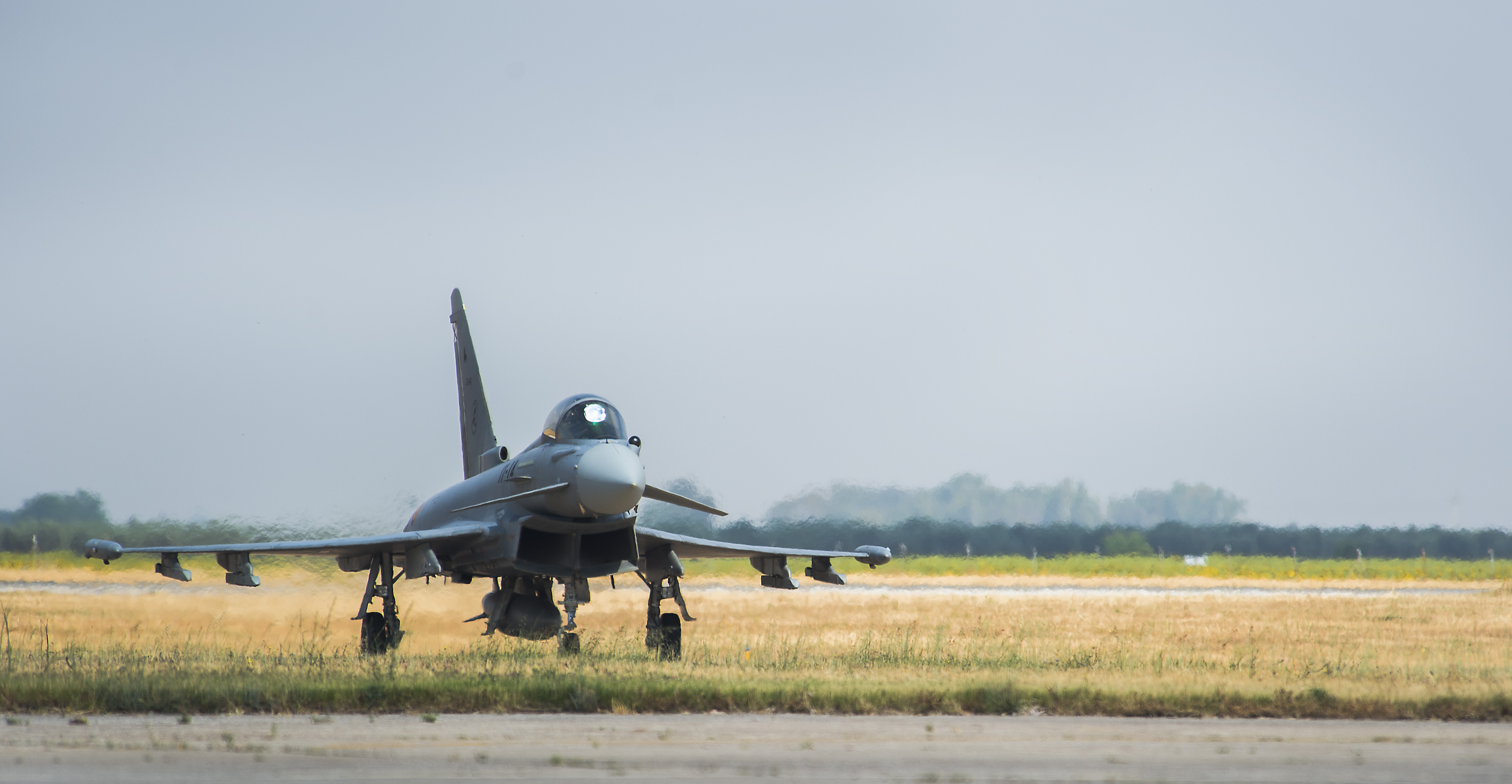
Spanish Eurofighter Typhoon of Ala 11 at Morón

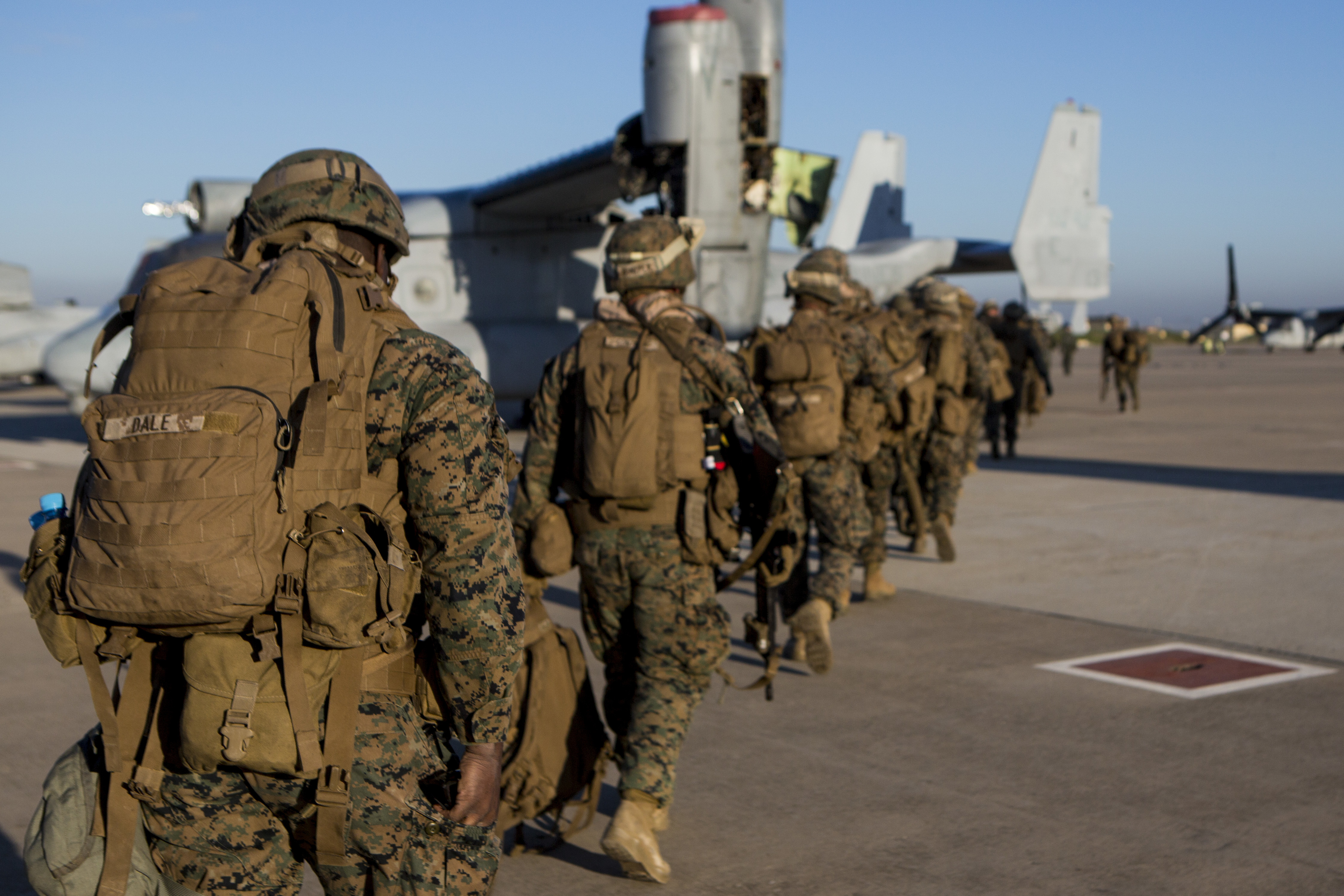
U.S. Marines with Special-Purpose Marine Air-Ground Task Force Crisis Response-Africa board an MV-22 Osprey during an alert force drill on Morón Air Base, Spain, Feb. 19, 2015. SPMAGTF-CR-AF maintains an alert status in order to respond to crises and regularly conducts unscripted events to test its ability to react at a moment's notice.

Flying and notable non-flying units based at Morón Air Base.

=== Spanish Air and Space Force ===
Combat Air Command

- 11th Wing
  - Group 11
    - 111th Squadron – c.16 Typhoon
    - 112th Squadron – c.16 Typhoon
    - 113th Squadron – c.16 Typhoon
- Second Air Deployment Support Squadron II (SEADA)
  - Ground Defense and Combat Search and Rescue Company
  - Transport Company
  - General Support Company

=== Spanish Military Emergencies Unit ===
- Emergency Intervention Battalion II

=== United States Air Force ===
US Air Forces in Europe - Air Forces Africa (USAFE-AFAFRICA)

- Third Air Force
  - 86th Airlift Wing
    - 65th Air Base Group
      - 496th Air Base Squadron

== Climate ==
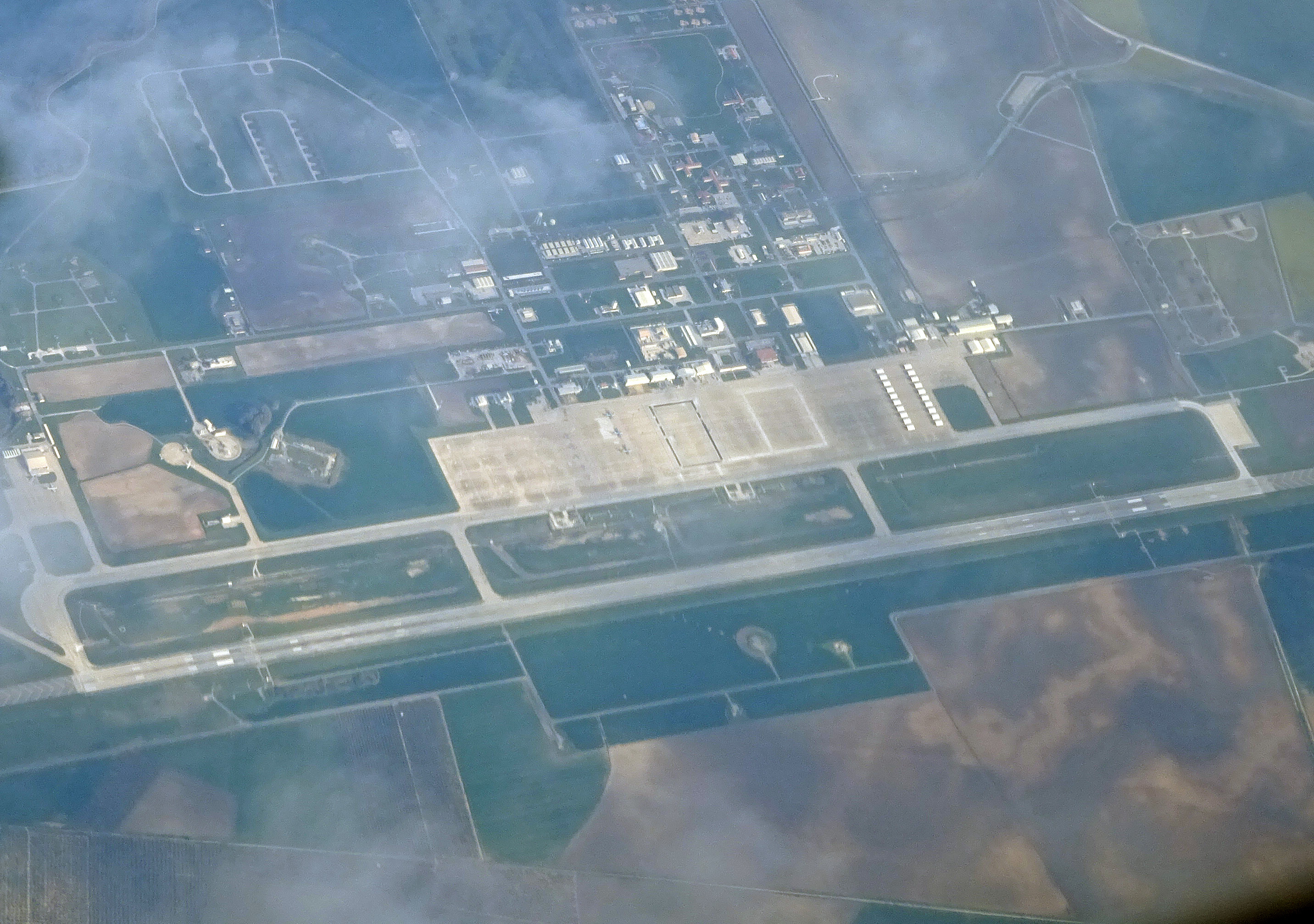
Aerial view of Morón Air Base

The Base's climate is characterized by the annual alternation between a dry period, which lasts more than four months and which has high temperatures, and another one humid (autumn-winter) with mild temperatures.

The monthly distribution of rain corresponds to one typical of the Mediterranean climate; the rain season takes place during the autumn and the winter; during the summer the absence of rain is the prevailing rule, except for very occasional summer storms. 41% of the rain happens during the autumn. The average annual temperature is 17.5 °C (63.5 °F). The average absolute maximum temperature is 41.9 °C (107.4 °F). The coldest month is January and the average absolute minimum temperature is 0.8 °C (33.4 °F). Summing up, the climate is excellent, although slightly harsh in the summer. The sun and a cloudless sky are predominant most of the time.

== Incidents and accidents ==
On 9 June 2014, at around 14:00 CEST (12:00 GMT), a pilot died after his Eurofighter Typhoon crashed whilst landing on the runway at the base. A Royal Saudi Air Force pilot was also killed in a Typhoon crash in August 2010.

== See also ==
- List of United States Air Force installations
- Naval Station Rota
