= Headquarters Air Command Europe =

HQ Air Command Europe was created to replace the Third and Sixteenth Numbered Air Forces as headquarters for United States Air Forces in Europe (USAFE) wings. Third Air Force inactivated and Sixteenth Air Force assumed the new role as the Warfighting Headquarters for USAFE. Most USAFE wings were reassigned to this new headquarters on 18 November 2005.

- 31st Fighter Wing - Aviano Air Base, Italy
  - F-16
- 38th Combat Support Wing (CSW) - Ramstein Air Base, Germany
  - Geographically Separated Unit (GSU) advocacy and support
- 39th Air Base Wing - Incirlik AB, Turkey
- 48th Fighter Wing - RAF Lakenheath, UK
  - F-15 Eagle
  - F-15E Strike Eagle
- 52d Fighter Wing - Spangdahlem AB, Germany
  - F-16 Fighting Falcon
  - A-10/OA-10
- 65th Air Base Wing - Lajes Air Base, Azores
  - En route transient aircraft support
- 86th Airlift Wing - Ramstein AB, Germany
  - C-130 Hercules
  - C-20A
  - C-21A
  - C-37A
- 100th Air Refueling Wing - RAF Mildenhall, UK
  - KC-135R
- 435th Air Base Wing - Ramstein Air Base, Germany
- 501st Combat Support Wing - RAF Mildenhall, UK
