= The Hereford Academy =

Coordinates: 52.0372°N 2.7275°W

Location
- Marlbrook Road; Hereford, Herefordshire, HR2 7NG; England

Information
- Type: Academy
- Local authority: Herefordshire Council
- Department for Education URN: 135662 Tables
- Ofsted: Reports
- Headteacher: Michael Stoppard
- Gender: Coeducational
- Age: 11 to 16
- Website: www.theherefordacademy.org.uk

The Hereford Academy is a secondary school and former sixth form located in Hereford, Herefordshire, England.

It was known as Haywood High School in the late seventies until 2006, when it was renamed as Wyebridge Sports College. On 1 September 2008 it was renamed The Hereford Academy. It has been re-classified as a Sports College. The Academy's new building opened in September 2011, and the demolition of the old school site, making way for new playing fields to be laid out, was completed in 2012.
