= Calvert Hinton Arnold =

United States Army general

- Born: November 23, 1894; Swainsboro, Georgia
- Died: May 18, 1963 (aged 68)
- Spouse: Sena Botswick
- Children: 1
- Military career
- Allegiance: United States
- Branch: United States Army
- Service years: 1917–1949
- Rank: Brigadier General
- Units: Georgia National Guard, Netherland East Indies, Southwest Pacific Area
- Commands: Central Signal Corps
- Conflicts: World War I, World War II
- Awards: Legion of Merit

Calvert Hinton Arnold (November 23, 1894 – May 18, 1963) was a Brigadier General in the United States Army during World War II. He was Chief Signal Officer in the Netherlands East Indies and Southwest Pacific. He was Commandant of the Central Signal Corps.

== Early life ==
Arnold was born on November 23, 1894, in Swainsboro, Georgia. He obtained a Bachelor of Science degree from Mercer University in 1915.

== Military career ==
During World War I, Arnold enlisted in the Georgia National Guard. In August 1917, he was commissioned in the infantry. From 1922 to 1927, he returned to Mercer University, obtained a Bachelor of Art degree and graduated from the Army Industrial College. Prior to World War II, Arnold graduated from the General Staff School and Army Staff College.

During World War II, Arnold was stationed in the Pacific Theater. He was chief signal officer in the Netherlands East Indies and the Southwest Pacific from January 1942 to May 1943. During the middle of the war, he was commandant of the Central Signal Corps from 1943 to 1945. Arnold was promoted to brigadier general in January 1945. As brigadier general, he served in the office of the chief signal officer from 1945 to 1949. For his role, Arnold was awarded the Legion of Merit.

== Later life ==
Arnold retired from service in October 1949.

== Personal life ==
Arnold married Sena Bostwick. Together, they had a child named Sena.

== Death and legacy ==
He died on May 18, 1963. Hinton is buried in Oak Grove Cemetery in Arlington, Georgia.
