= United States Forces Azores =

U.S. Department of Defense subordinate unified command

The United States Forces Azores (USAFORAZ) is based at Lajes Field, Portugal near Lajes on Terceira Island in the Azores.

In 1953, the U.S. Forces Azores Command was organized as a subordinate Unified Command under the Command-in-Chief Atlantic. In peacetime, the U.S. Forces Commander (COMUSFORAZ) is assisted by a small joint staff responsible for contingency planning.

== History ==
In August 1958, Major General George B. Dany assumed command of the U.S. Forces, Azores, remaining in command until August 1961. While there he became the first American to receive Portugal's Distinguished Service Medal.

== Mission Objectives ==
Members of U.S. Forces Azores provide base and en route support for Department of Defense, allied nations, and other aircraft transiting the installation. Air Force units that make up the 65th Air Base Group.

In peacetime, a small joint staff composed of Army, Navy, and Air Force personnel assists the U.S. Forces Azores commander, who is responsible for contingency planning. In wartime, the U.S. Forces Azores commander assumes operational control of assigned U.S. military forces. The command mission would be to support NATO forces in the area, to assist in local defense, if requested, and to protect and evacuate U.S. citizens from the Azores, Europe, Africa, Southwest Asia, or other areas of the world.

== Force Structure ==
U.S. Forces Azores Command consists of a small joint staff, the 65th Air Base Group, and multiple tenant organizations such as the 729th Airlift Squadron, the Military Traffic Management Command Azores Detachment and the base's resident officer in charge of construction.

There are approximately 425 U.S. military and 10 Department of Defense civilians assigned to the group. The total U.S. population, including dependents, is about 2,170. Department of Defense employs approximately 930 Portuguese civilians at Lajes Field.

An Air Force colonel serves jointly as U.S. Forces Azores commander and as commander of the 65th Air Base Group, Air Combat Command.
