= Railway Sub Office =

A Railway Sub Office was an office of the British Royal Mail which received mail directly from a rail source for distribution to surrounding districts, without the mail having first been sent to a regional sorting office and forwarding. After the first RSO was established in 1855, over 2000 such designations were made, the post marks bearing the RSO designation after the post-town's name. The designation ceased after 1905 when road transport became easier and more efficient, but many RSO's continued to use their cancellation stamps for many years after.

The letters are frequently but inaccurately explained as 'Railway Sorting Office'.
