= Resident space object =

Natural or artificial object that orbits another body

A resident space object (RSO) is a natural or artificial object that orbits another celestial body. For example, it may orbit the Sun, Earth, or Mars. The term RSO is most often applied to Earth-orbiting objects, in which case the possible orbit classifications for an object are low Earth orbit (LEO), medium Earth orbit (MEO), high Earth orbit (HEO) or geosynchronous Earth orbit (GEO).

== Identification of RSOs ==
RSO acquisition, tracking, and data collection can be extremely challenging. The primary method for gathering this information is to make a direct observation of an RSO via space surveillance sensors. However, the system is not foolproof, and RSOs can become lost to the tracking system. Additionally, not all new objects are acquired in a timely fashion, which means that these new objects, in addition to the lost RSOs, result in uncorrelated detections when they are finally observed. Since space missions have been increasing over the years, the number of uncorrelated targets is at an all-time high.

== Cataloging ==
A number of international agencies endeavor to maintain catalogs of the man-made RSOs currently orbiting Earth. One example is the two-line element set public catalog.
