= 65th Air Base Group =

65th Air Base Group

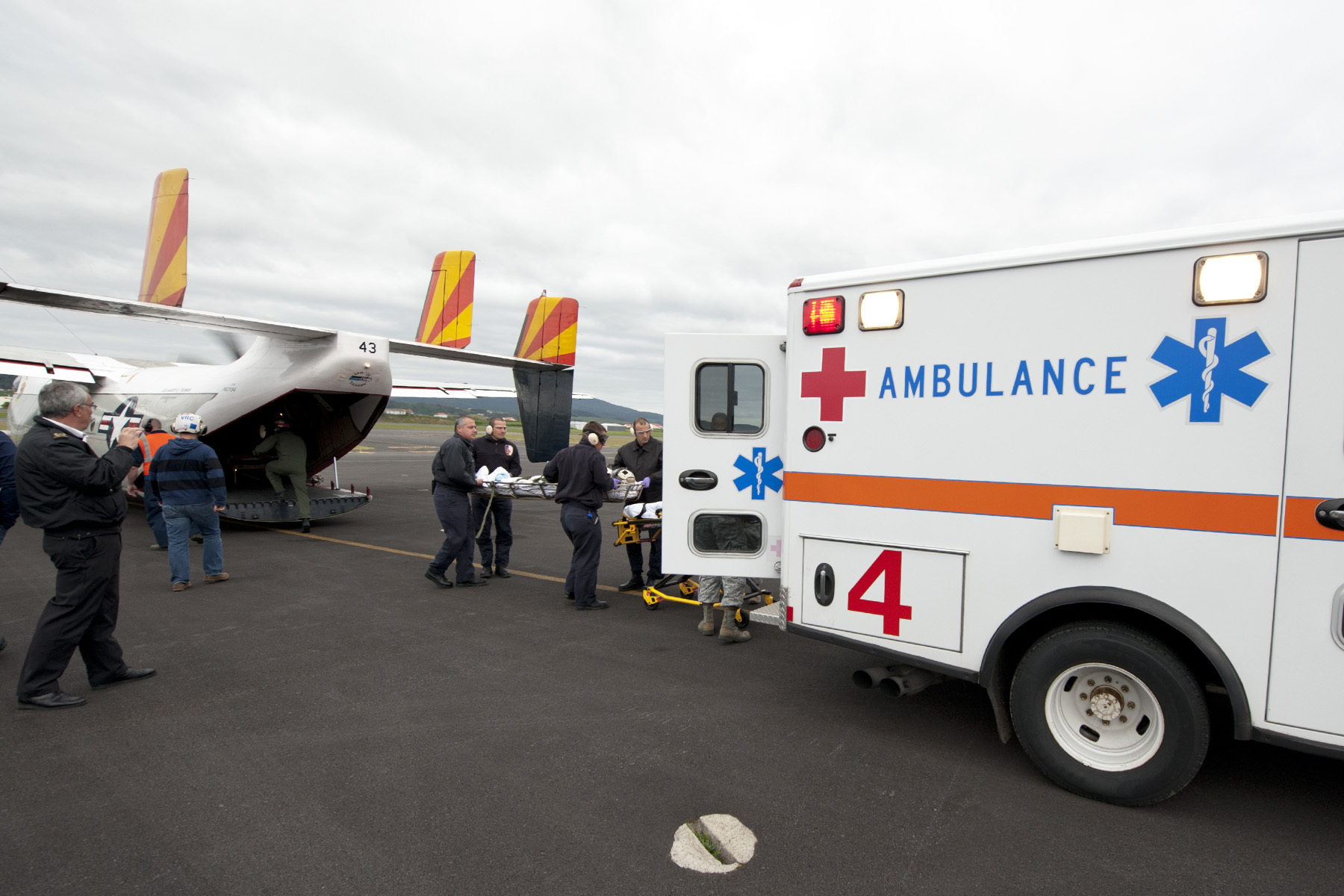
- 65th Medical Squadron Airmen medevac US Navy Sailor
- Active: 1952–1953; 1982–present
- Country: United States
- Branch: United States Air Force
- Role: Base support
- Part of: United States Air Forces in Europe – Air Forces Africa: Third Air Force; 86th Airlift Wing
- Garrison/HQ: Lajes Field, Portugal
- Decorations: Air Force Outstanding Unit Award

Commanders
- Current commander: Colonel Daniel Furleigh

Insignia
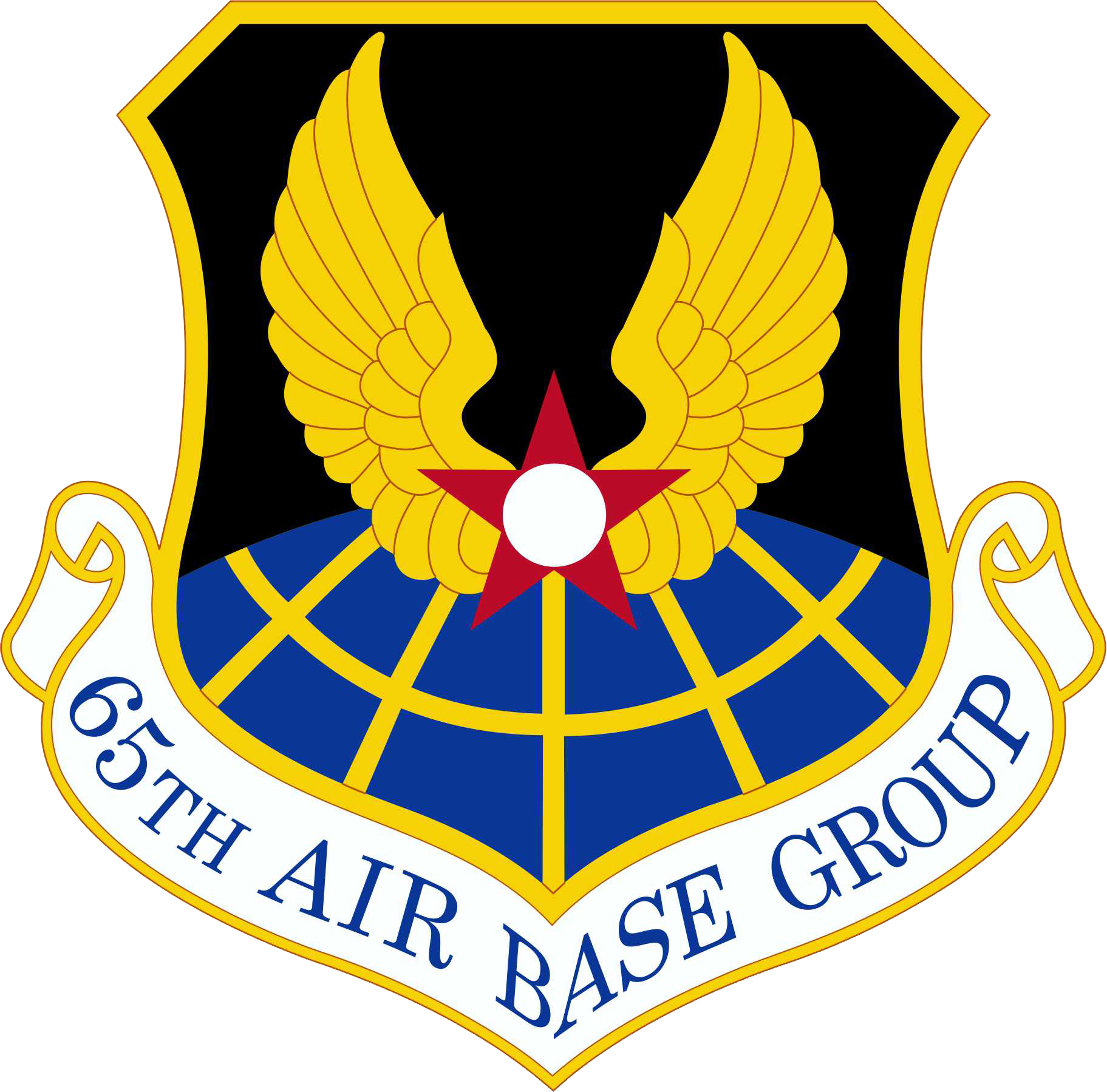
- 65th Air Base Group emblem (Note: Approved 15 June 2007.)

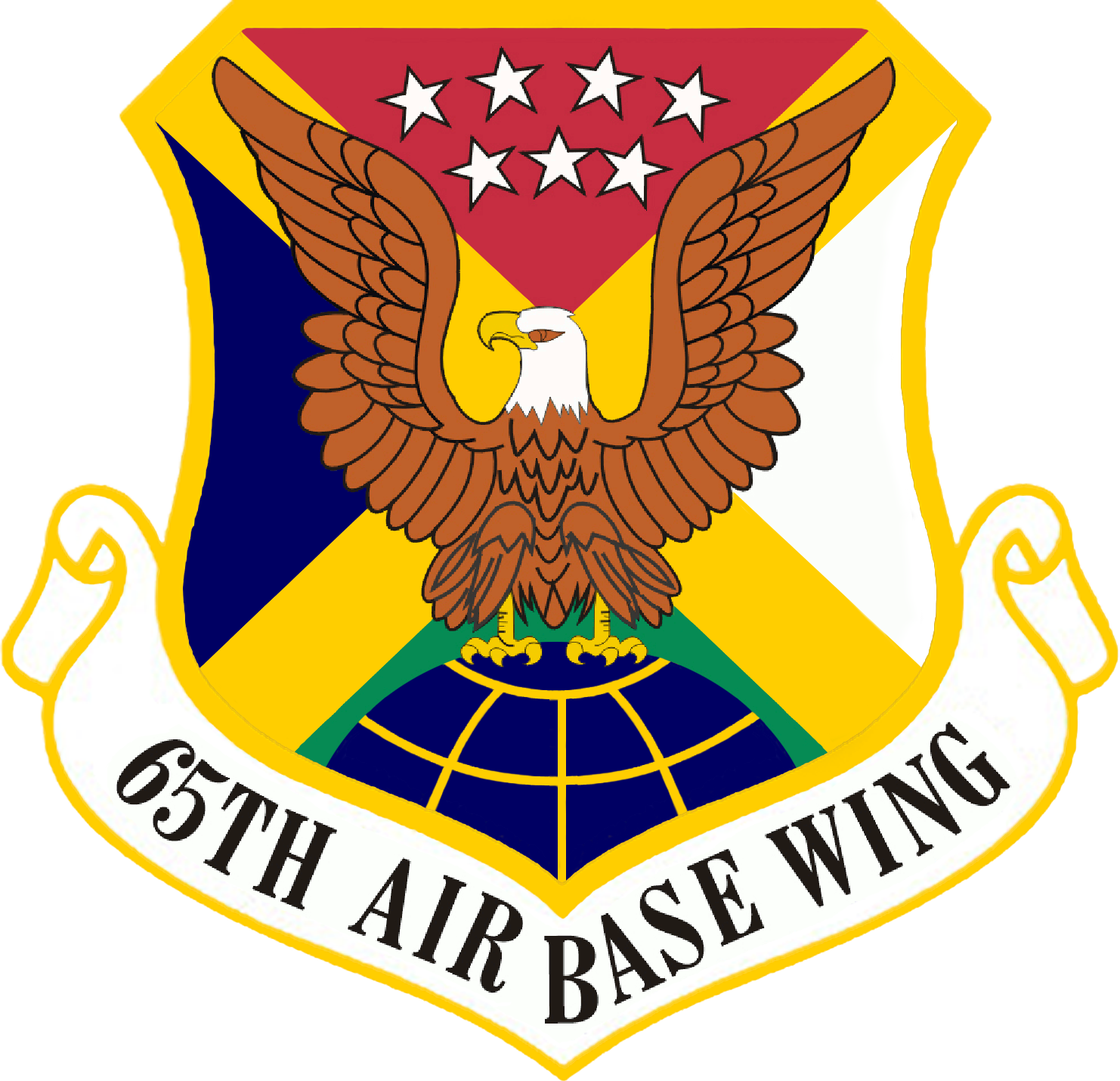
- 65th Air Base Wing emblem (Note: Approved 6 August 1987. Description: Per saltire, Gules, Argent, Vert, and Azure, a saltire Or; in base a demi-globe of the fourth [color]; thereon an eagle with wings displayed proper; in chief an arc of seven mullets, four and three of the second [color]. Robertson erroneously gives the date of approval as 15 June 2007, the date the group emblem was approved.)

The 65th Air Base Group is a group of the United States Air Force based at Lajes Field, Azores, Portugal.

The group provides base and en route support for the U.S. Department of Defense, allied nations and other authorized aircraft in transit, including those from the Netherlands, Belgium, Canada, France, Italy, Colombia, Germany, Venezuela and Great Britain.

== Components ==
- 65th Civil Engineer Squadron
- 65th Logistics Readiness Squadron
- 65th Air Base Squadron
- 65th Comptroller Squadron
- 65th Force Support Flight
- 496th Air Base Squadron

== History ==
The 65th was first organized at Mitchel Air Force Base, New York as the 65th Troop Carrier Wing in 1952. It conducted "reserve training toward proficiency with troop carrier aircraft from 1952–1953. However, the wing was never fully manned or equipped."

The 1605th Military Airlift Support Wing replaced the 1605th Air Base Wing as the Military Airlift Command unit managing facilities at Lajes Field in January 1982. Ten years later, the two units were consolidated as the 65th Support Wing.

It has "provided en route support for aircraft transiting Lajes Air Base from 1982 to the present." Its commander also serves as Commander, United States Forces Azores. The unit also "provided base support to elements of the United States Army and U.S. Navy in the area." The 65th "supported deployment of personnel and equipment through Lajes during operations in the Persian Gulf from August 1990 – April 1991" and in support of the War in Afghanistan (2001–2021) (Operation Enduring Freedom) and the War in Iraq (Operation Iraqi Freedom) since 2001 and 2003 respectively.

On 14 August 2015, the wing was redesignated as a group and reassigned to the 86th Airlift Wing.

On 21 August 2015, Airman 1st Class Spencer Stone, a medical technician of the 65th Medical Operations Squadron was one of 6 passengers, including three Americans who thwarted the attack on a high speed train travelling from Brussels to Paris by an armed gunman by tackling and subduing him, then helping to provide medical aid to a wounded passenger. On 16 September 2015, he received the Airman's Medal and a Purple Heart medal from U.S. Secretary of Defense Ashton Carter at the Pentagon.

== Lineage ==
65th Strategic Reconnaissance Wing

- Established as the 65th Troop Carrier Wing, Medium on 26 May 1952

Activated in the Reserve on 14 June 1952
Inactivated on 1 April 1953

- Redesignated 65th Strategic Reconnaissance Wing, Medium on 1 April 1953
- Consolidated with the 1605th Military Airlift Support Wing as the 1605th Military Airlift Support Wing on 1 January 1992

65th Air Base Group

- Established as the 1605th Military Airlift Support Wing and activated on 1 January 1982
- Consolidated with the 65th Strategic Reconnaissance Wing on 1 January 1992

Redesignated 65th Support Wing on 27 January 1992
Redesignated 65th Air Base Wing on 1 October 1993
Redesignated 65th Air Base Group 11 August 2015

=== Assignments ===
- First Air Force, 14 June 1952 – 1 April 1953
- Twenty-First Air Force 1 January 1982
- Eighth Air Force, 1 October 1993
- Third Air Force, 1 October 2002
- United States Air Forces Europe, 1 November 2005
- Air Command Europe, 18 November 2005
- Third Air Force (Air Forces Europe), 1 December 2006
- 86th Airlift Wing, 11 August 2015

=== Components ===
Groups

- 65th Troop Carrier Group, 14 June 1952 – 1 April 1953
- 65th Air Base Group (later 1605th Air Base Group, 65th Support Group, 65th Mission Support Group), 14 June 1952 – 1 April 1953, 1 January 1982 – 14 August 2015
- 65th Logistics Group, 27 January 1992 – c. 1997
- 65th Medical Group (later USAF Hospital, Lajes, 65th Medical Group), 14 June 1952 – 1 April 1953, 1 January 1982 – present

Squadrons

- 65th Civil Engineer Squadron, 14 August 2015 – present
- 65th Comptroller Squadron (later 65th Comptroller Flight), 1 February 1996 – present
- 65th Logistics Readiness Squadron, 14 August 2015 – present
- 65th Security Forces Squadron, 14 August 2015 – present
- 1605 Military Airlift Support Squadron (later 65 Military Airlift Support Squadron): 1 January 1982 – 1 October 1993
- 1936th Communications Squadron (later 1605th Communications Squadron, 65th Communications Squadron), 1 September 1990 – 1 September 1997, 14 August 2015 – present
- 496th Air Base Squadron, 1 April 2019 – present

Flights

- 65th Comptroller Flight (see 65th Comptroller Squadron)
- 65th Force Support Flight, 14 August 2015 – present

=== Stations ===
- Mitchel Air Force Base, New York, 14 June 1952 – 1 April 1953
- Lajes Field, Azores, 1 January 1982 – present

=== Aircraft ===
- Curtiss C-46 Commando (1952–1953)
