= Llanthomas Castle Mound =

Former castle mound in Powys, Wales

- Tomen Llantomos (Welsh)
- Llanigon, Brecknockshire (Powys), Wales
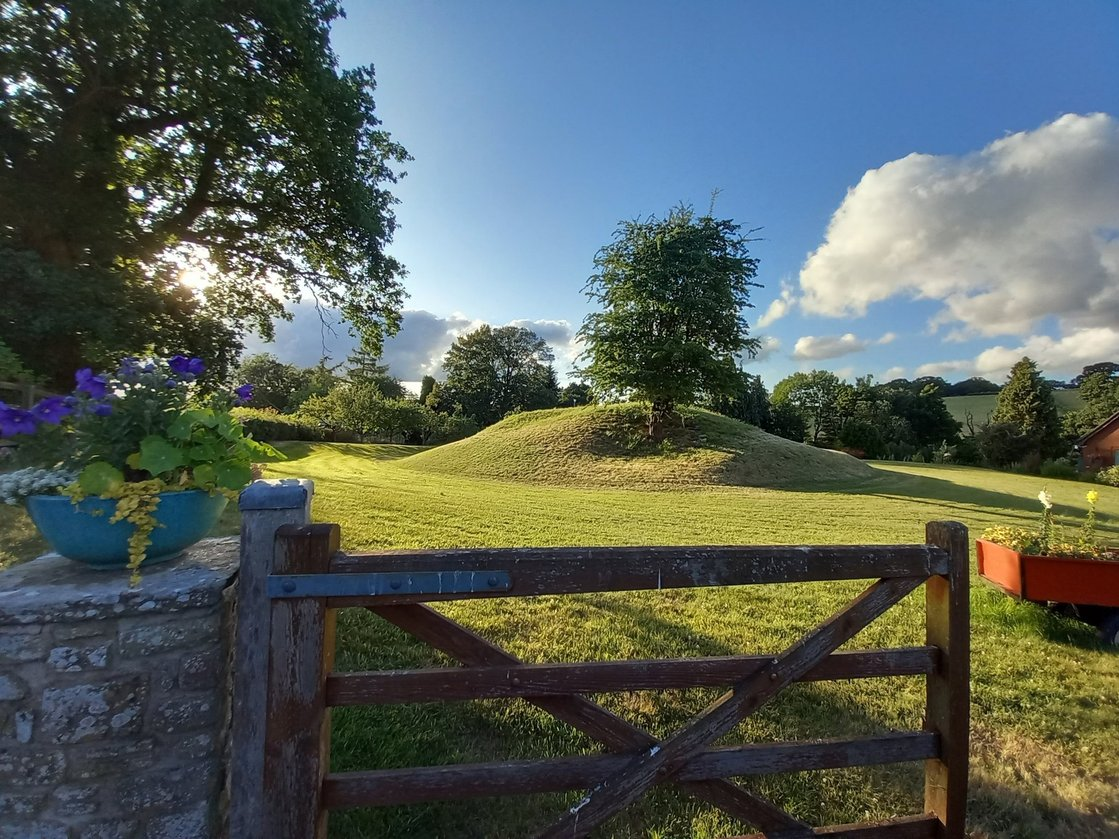
- Motte viewed from single carriage-way section of Llanthomas lane, Llanigon

Site information
- Type: Remains of a motte-and-bailey castle

Location
- Location in Powys
- Location within Powys
- Coordinates: 52.056°N 3.1548°W
- Area: 9 metres (30 ft) (summit diameter); 24 metres (79 ft) (base diameter)
- Height: 3 metres (9.8 ft)

Garrison information
- Designations

Scheduled monument
- Official name: Llanthomas Castle Mound
- Reference no.: BR078

Llanthomas Castle Mound in Llanigon (near Hay-on-Wye), Powys, was built by the Normans after the 1066 Norman Conquest of England, probably after the first or second Norman invasion of Wales, but before 1215. It was a motte-and-bailey castle design. The building materials were earth, rubble, and timber. The earth was probably obtained from the surrounding ditch and the timber from nearby woods.

Cadw are the Welsh government-funded regulatory body for the scheduling of historical assets in Wales. They describe Llanthomas Castle Mound as "an important relic of medieval architecture which might extend knowledge of medieval defensive practices". Their scheduled area comprises the motte and a substantial area of lawn at the base of the motte, where "related evidence is expected to survive".

== History ==
Antiquarian sources have revealed the link between Llanthomas Castle Mound with Hay-on-Wye, Llanigon, Llanthomas and Little Ffordd-Fawr (a ford crossing the River Wye).

In Tudor times, Theophilus Jones suggested that Llanigo (Llaneygan in Anglo-Saxon, known today as Llanigon) was named after the first British female saint called Eigen. Saint Eigen lived around the end of the 1st century in the settlement called Trefynys (known today as Llanthomas). The pre-conquest nucleated settlement grew around a church, possibly on the site of the existing church of St. Eigon, in Llanigon. The earliest reference to the church of St. Eigon is between 1148 and 1155. The oldest part of the current church building dates to the 13th century, suggesting that the current building was built on or near the site of an older church. Nothing is known of the history of the Trefynys settlement, "though some relationship with the motte at Llanthomas 700m down the Digeddi Brook seems assured". Lewys Dwnn suggests that the dedication of the church of St. Eigon in Llanigon and/or the derivation of the village name Llanigon is unclear. The dedications might be honouring the first century Saint Eigen or the 6th century Saint Eigion, both are local Welsh saints.

The "motte at Llanthomas" is formally called Llanthomas Castle Mound and was part of the Norman Llanthomas lordship, a sub-lordship of the Hay lordship. Llanthomas Castle Mound was built in the late 11th or early 12th century. Unlike Hay Tump, it is not known who built Llanthomas Castle Mound, but it is known to have existed from the early days of the Norman Conquest.

John Leyland visited Llanigo and its castle between 1536 and 1539. He wrote about the castle, "Llanigo apperith a tour tanquam noxiorum custodiae deputata". That is, the castle was "intended for guarding against evil-doers". William Camden adds that "at Llanigo appears a castle or tower". The mention of a tower approximately 350 years after initial construction, suggests that the original wooden keep was refortified with a shell keep and/or a stone keep. These days the surface at the top of Llanthomas Castle Mound is uneven. This is sometimes indicative of buried rubble from a collapsed stone structure. Conversely, a wooden keep sometimes results in a level top surface after the above ground wood has rotted.

John Lloyd wrote "the tumulus below Llanthomas is said to direct to the ford on the Wye". William Morgan interpreted this to mean that the castle guarded the road leading down to the River Wye. An Ordnance Survey map (published in 1888) shows that the road connects to the River Wye via the nearby ford called Little Ffordd-Fawr.

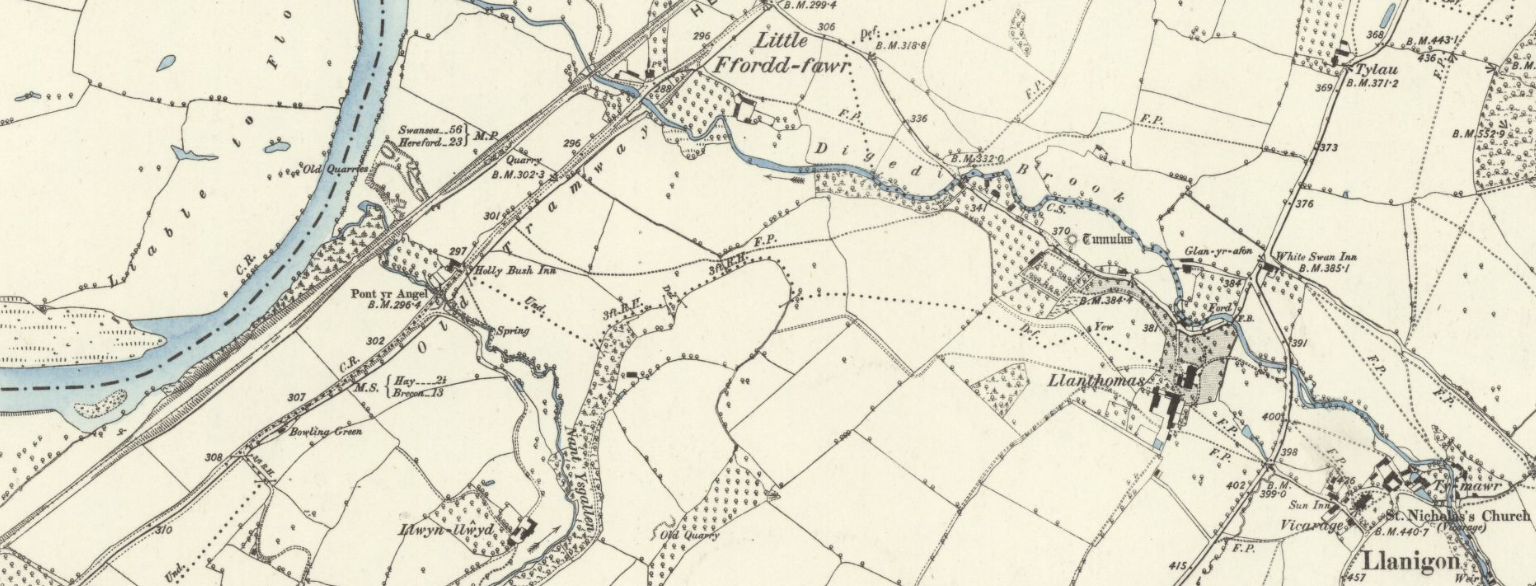
Llanthomas to Little Ffordd-Fawr via Tumulus in 1888 map.

CPAT indicate that Llanthomas is historically significant because it has "a motte from the early days of the Norman Conquest", and in the Tudor era its "ancient mansion" (as Samuel Lewis called it) was owned by a high-status individual. Samuel Lewis reveals that around the time of Leyland's visit, the Lord of Llanthomas was Sir Walter Deveraux, the Lord Chief Justice of South Wales. Edwin Poole listed many of the other high-status individuals who had lived in Llanthomas up to the 20th century (see Notable people below).

The Llanthomas area has had a rich history for at least the last two millennia. The history is associated with

- Saint Eigen and Caractacus (her father) and the Roman conquest of Britain,
- the Devereux family and the Norman invasion of Wales
- and more recently the diarist Francis Kilvert. Francis walked along both sections of Llanthomas lane to visit "Daisy" (daughter of William Thomas), who lived in the modernised domicile of the Llanthomas lordship. The proposal of marriage was made within the walled gardens facing Llanthomas Castle Mound.

The history associated with the Llanthomas area may be older. When possible the Normans speeded up castle construction by building on existing Iron Age or Bronze Age hillforts, or Roman ruins or ditch, augmenting the castle's defensive architecture. The evidence is thin but some antiquarian scholars believed that Llanthomas Castle Mound was built on an Iron Age tumulus. Until recently, many maps labelled Llanthomas Castle Mound as a tumulus.

== Motte and Bailey Castle architecture ==
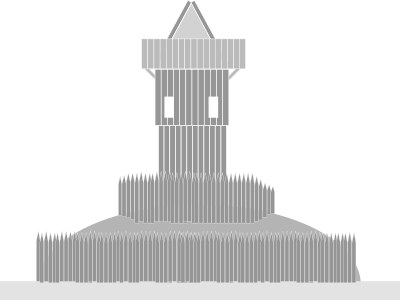
A typical Motte and Bailey castle

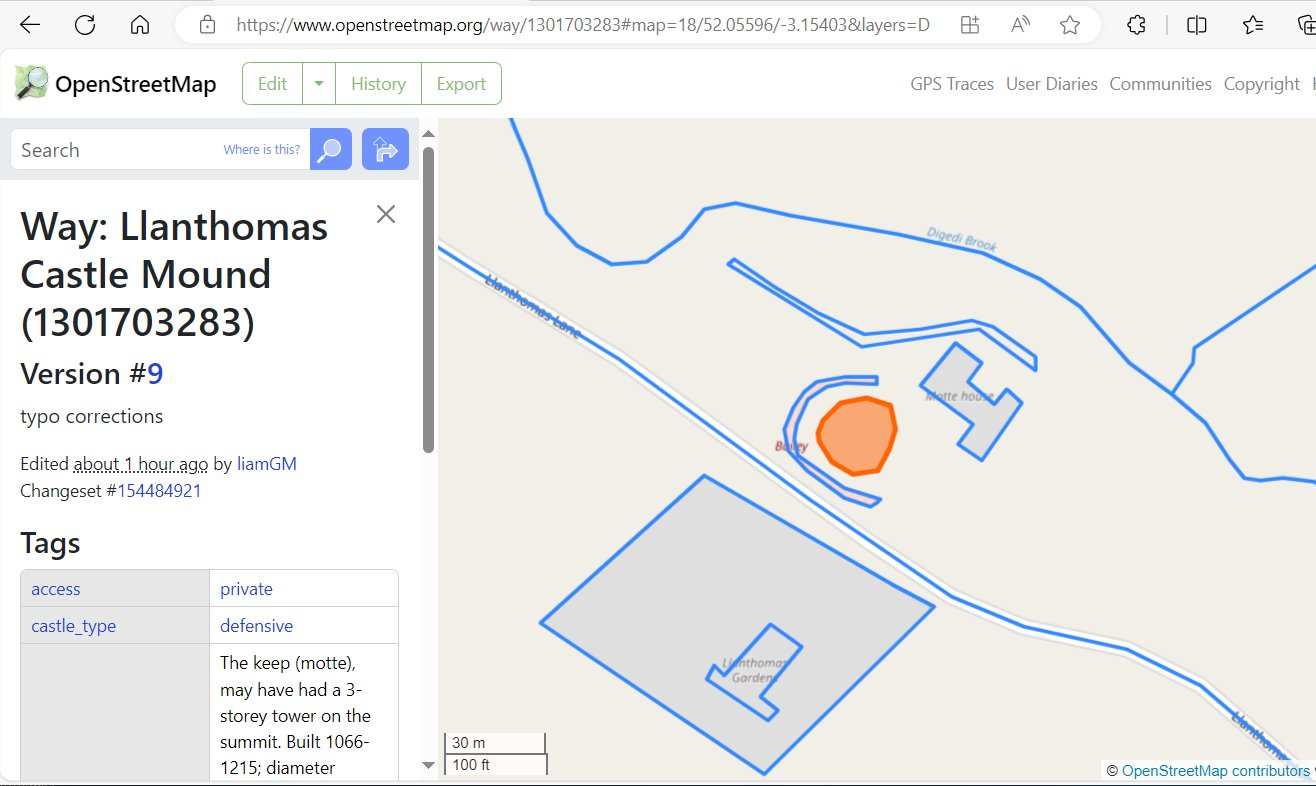
Surviving motte, ditch and possible footing for the bailey fencing

Llanthomas Castle Mound is the remains of a motte-and-bailey medieval castle. A typical castle architecture included:

- a multi-storey wooden watchtower (i.e. the keep/donjon) on the summit of the mound/motte,
- a wooden palisade fence around the keep,
- a wooden palisade fence around the bailey/courtyard and
- a deep ditch surrounding the bailey.

The majority of Motte and Bailey castles, had a mound less than 5m in height, as is Llanthomas Castle Mound.

Nearly a millennium after the construction of Llanthomas Castle Mound the only above ground wood is a self-seeded hawthorn tree. The evidence of the castle today consists of the motte, the ditch and buried walls. The walls underpinned the wooden fence surrounding the bailey (along Llanthomas lane) and near the top of the ditch "all the way down to the brook" (on the north/north-west side).

The typical enclosed bailey was often kidney/pear shaped, where the narrower end wrapped around the motte. The bailey will have included the living quarters for the garrison of soldiers/archers and perhaps the family of the Lord of the manor (and servants). The bailey contained facilities to sustain a military settlement. For example, kitchens, halls, workshops, forges, armouries, stables, barns for livestock, storage areas and a chapel.

A bailey covered a considerable land area, and may have used much of the level land from Llanthomas Castle Mound along the single carriageway section of Llanthomas lane (the C74) in the direction of Llanigon. An Ordnance Survey map (see above) shows that the area that wrapped around the tumulus was fully enclosed by Digeddi brook and Llanthomas lane. As recently as the 1980's the area at the base of the motte and to the east was used for grazing sheep and was called Bailey Court. In recent times Bailey Court has been split into private dwellings and agricultural land. Traces of a possible site for a kitchen area within the bailey has been found about 50m to the south-east of the motte. Digeddi brook (a tributary of the River Wye) runs along the base of the ditch offering a vital natural resource for any military settlement.

== Field work ==
Motte and bailey castles were built in an age when written records were sparse, above ground wood has long since rotted and any masonry has been repurposed.

In 1921, the William Morgan vicar at the pre-conquest church of St. Eigon, Llanigon, an amateur archaeologist hosted a visit from the Woolhope club. The club studied the natural history, geology, archaeology and the history of Herefordshire, England. William dug a small excavation trench on the summit of the motte, but no artefacts were found from the brief excavation. There is no known record of any professional-level archaeological excavation or geophysical survey of Llanthomas Castle Mound.

In 1988, the professional archaeologist Peter Dorling with the Clwyd-Powys Archaeological Trust conducted an excavation of a possible site for the bailey courtyard. The work included topsoil stripping, site levelling and excavation of foundation trenches. They discovered activity associated with the motte. Artefacts were found including a sherd from the base of a medieval cooking pot. Their report describes a number of visible stone-filled features. They state "Four definite features were noted during the excavation ... The most distinctive of these was a stone-filled pit or ditch butt-end ... its basal fill contained some quantity of charcoal". The archaeologist's report concluded it is likely to have been a kitchen within the bailey.

== Toponymy ==
People and place names in Wales are derived from Welsh, Anglo-Norman, Latin, Anglo-Saxon and Middle English etc. Over time the nouns have evolved from language to language leading to uncertainty about the original noun.

"Llan" is Welsh for the sacred land around a church. Llanigon may be derived from "Llan" and either "Eigen" (daughter of Caractacus) or "Eigion" (brother of Saint Cynidr).

Llanthomas was known as Trefynys from the 1st century up to Norman times. The Welsh words "Tref" and "ynys" mean "settlement" (or "town") and "island", respectively. Trefynys is used in Welsh place names to denote a populated area or settlement. By the 14th century, Trefynys was known by the Middle English name Seint Thomas chirche or the Middle French name Thomascherche or the Middle Welsh name Llandomas (c.1400 - c.1475/80). The settlement name depends on the language of the source document. Since the 16th century it has been called Llandthomas/Llan thomas and finally Llanthomas, a settlement within the village of Llanigon.

Just as the derivation of the village name Llanigon is unclear, so to is the derivation of the settlement name Llanthomas. Since the 14th century St. Thomas is the common factor in all the names used in all languages, but which St. Thomas is unclear: dedications to the Apostle are rare in Wales, dedications to the medieval St. Thomas a Becket are more common, but it might have been the local St. Thomas of Hereford.

The French words "motte" and "bailey" mean "mound" and "enclosure" respectively in English. Motte-and-bailey castles without evidence of the original bailey are called castle mounds (or tumps or twts). Until recently, the grazing field around Llanthomas Castle Mound was called Bailey Court. The words "bailey" and "court" are of Norman origin. The Normans used the word "donjon" for the keep. It is derived from the Latin word "dominarium" meaning "lordship", emphasising the link between the castle and the Lord of the manor.

The modern formal name Llanthomas Castle Mound was established by Cadw, who were founded in 1984. Antiquarian and sources prior to 1984 identified Llanthomas Castle Mound with names reflecting its close proximity to Llanigon and Hay-on-Wye. It has been referred to as "Llanthomas Motte", "Llanthomas", "Llanthomas Mound", and "Llanigon Castle". Some antiquarian sources alluded to Llanthomas Castle Mound as "the tumulus on the brook below Llanthomas", "the mound at Llanigon Castle", "the ruins of the castle at Llanigon to Llowes ford" and "the mound in Bailey Court".

Llanthomas Castle Mound has an association with the Hay-on-Wye castles. In 1961, castleologist, D. J. Cathcart King in his magnum opus aspired to list all UK castles. Hay Castle is listed as Hay No. 1, Hay Tump as Hay No. 2 and Llanthomas Castle Mound as Hay No. 3. The Hay castles are numbered 6, 22 and 23 respectively in his index. Also in 1961 the Ministry of Works published a list of UK monuments whose preservation was considered to be of "national importance". Llanthomas Castle Mound is associated with Hay Rural and Hay Tump with Hay Urban, referencing the post-1894 civil parishes.

== Location ==
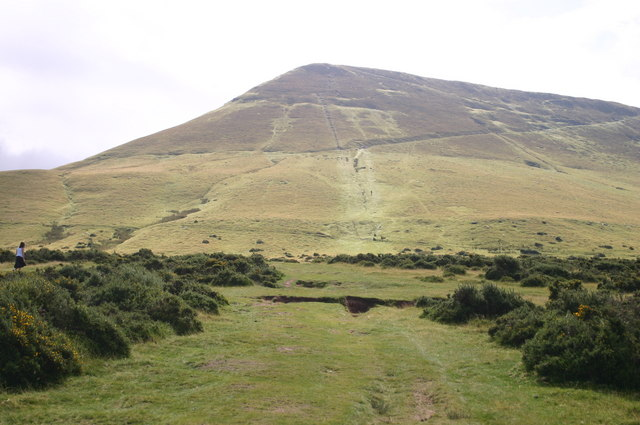
Hay Bluff

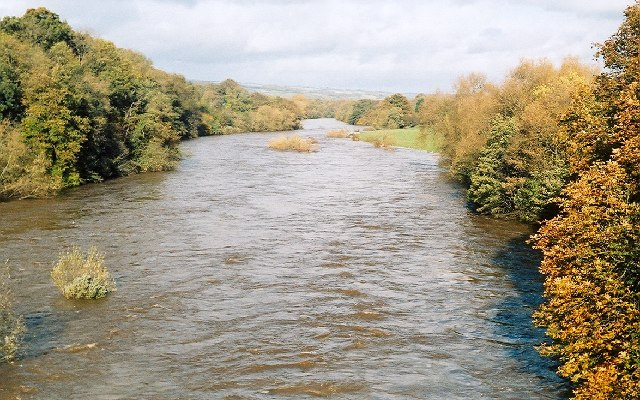
River Wye at Hay-on-Wye

Llanthomas Castle Mound is on private property but is viewable from the single-carriageway section of Llanthomas lane (i.e. the C74), opposite the walled Llanthomas gardens. Llanthomas Castle Mound is a short walk from the village of Llanigon and less than 2 miles from Hay-on-Wye, the "town of books". It is on the same lane as the site of the Hay Festival fields (Dairy meadows).

Adjacent private properties on the same section of Llanthomas lane are mentioned in the Francis Kilvert diaries and are associated with the Thomas family. This includes Llanthomas cottage (their gardener), Llanthomas lodge (their laundry) and Llanthomas gardens (their kitchen garden). The associated land for these Victorian/Edwardian properties were once part of the Llanthomas lordship (see below). Kilvert frequently visited the nearby Llanthomas Hall (adjacent to Llanthomas farm) and the vicarage of St. Eigon in Llanigon.

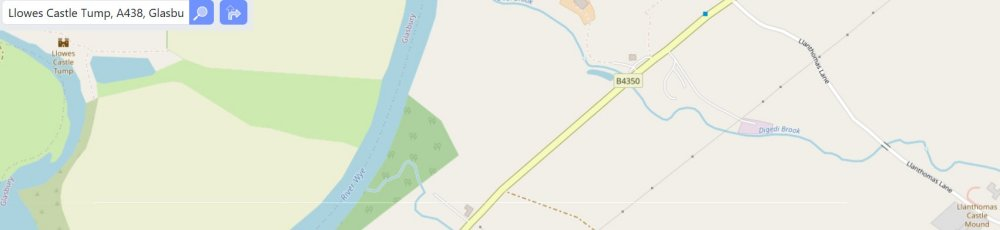
LCM to Llowes Tump - Map data © OpenStreetMap contributors, CC BY-SA 2.0

Llanthomas Castle Mound is located in Powys, Wales but has a Herefordshire postcode. The historic county of Brecknockshire became Powys in 1974. It is about 2 miles from the border with England in the area known as the Welsh Marches. Llanthomas Castle Mound is in the foothills of Hay Bluff in the Bannau Brycheiniog. The location of Llanthomas Castle Mound may have been chosen because it occupies a high point that once overlooked the River Wye less than a mile away. Currently there is no direct line of sight to the river due to modern hedges, trees, and buildings. The fording point Little Ffordd-Fawr is located between Llanthomas Castle Mound and the south bank of the river. Mottes sometimes had a direct line of sight with a nearby motte as is the case with Llanthomas Castle Mound and Llowes Castle Tump on the north bank of the river. Nearby, Clyro and Hay castles may also have been twinned. The strategic purpose for twinning was to control both sides of the river connected by a fording point, reinforcing Norman dominance along the Middle Wye Valley.

Other surviving Norman castles near Llanthomas Castle Mound, reveals the collective defensive military and trading roles for all the castles along the Middle Wye Valley. There are a number of castles less than 5 miles from Llanthomas Castle Mound:

- 1.1 miles: Llowes Castle/Llowes Motte/Llowes Castle Tump,
- 1.5 miles: Hay-on-Wye the Castle and Tump,
- 2.0 miles: Clyro Castle,
- 2.2 miles: Glasbury Motte (see "Glasbury Castle"),
- 2.5 miles: Cusop Castle (see "Cusop Castle", "Mouse Castle"),
- 2.7 miles: Aberllynfi Castle/Great House Mound,
- 2.8 miles: Castle Kinsey (in Clyro),
- 3.9 miles: Clifford Castle,
- 4.5 miles: Painscastle Castle; Boughrood Motte,
- 5.0 miles: Bronllys Castle.

In more peaceful times, Llanthomas Castle Mound and Llowes Castle Tump protected a trading route between Brecknockshire (south of the River Wye) and Radnorshire (north of the River Wye). Small quarries were once active in the area "for the limestone which occurs in narrow banks within the sandstone of the Black Mountains". Limestone was carted through Llanigon parish on to Radnorshire via Llanthomas road (now lane) and the fording point Little Ffordd-Fawr. In the 19th century limestone, building stone and roofing tiles were quarried locally. There were also mills on the Digeddi brook close to Llanthomas Castle Mound at Llanthomas lodge and at Penglomen (the "pigeon's head").

| OS Map Grid Reference | SO 2091 4036 |
| what3words | provoking.rave.longer |
| Postcode | HR3 5PU |
| Latitude: 52.056 | Longitude: -3.1548 |
| Latitude: 52° 3' 21"N | Longitude: 3° 9' 17"W |
| OS Eastings: 320919 | OS Northings: 240366 |
| Mapcode National GBR F0.DL2G | Mapcode International: VH6BJ.8LK6 |

== Welsh Government records ==
Cadw scheduled monuments receive legal protection under the Historic Environment (Wales) Act 2016 and the Ancient Monuments and Archaeological Areas Act 1979. Cadw provide an initial scheduling report and assign a field monument warden, a professional archaeologist, to keep a watching brief on the scheduled site. The Cadw scheduled report for Llanthomas Castle Mound (BR078) states that there is a strong possibility that Llanthomas Castle Mound and the scheduled area (the grassed area at the base of the motte) have both structural evidence and intact associated deposits. The report concludes that Llanthomas Castle Mound is an important relic of the medieval landscape.

The Welsh Archaeological Trusts maintain regional historic environment records on behalf of the Welsh government. The Clwyd-Powys Archaeological Trust (CPAT) records for Llanthomas Castle Mound include past Cadw reports: PRN 443 (1986), 38278 (1988), 2586 (1995). In 2024, CPAT and the other three archaeological organisations covering Wales merged into a single archaeological organisation called Heneb.

The Coflein online database, stores the National Monuments Record of Wales (NMRW). The archive is located in the National Library of Wales in Aberystwyth. The archive record for Llanthomas Castle Mound (PRN 306308) include a hundred years of reports: 6057064, 6054097, 6064626, 6140925, 6140927, 6359576, 6464877, 6140926, 6140924, 6054098, 6059886, 6519900.

== Online references ==
Llanthomas Castle Mound is included in many online lists of medieval castles in Wales:

- Archaeology Data Service, see Llanthomas Motte.
- List of tumps in England and Wales, see Llanthomas Castle Mound.
- List of Castles in Wales, see Llanthomas Castle Mound.
- List of the medieval fortified sites of the historic county of Brecknockshire, see Llanthomas Castle Mound.
- Welsh Castle Database, see Llanthomas Motte.
- Vanished Castles of Wales and the Marches, see Llanthomas Castle Mound.
- The Castle Guide – a selection of castles from around the UK, see Llanthomas Motte.
- Anglo-Norman Castles, see Llanthomas.
- Historical Britain - Mottes, see Llanthomas Motte.
- Where to Photograph Castles in Brecknockshire, see Llanthomas.
- Castlefacts, see Llanthomas Motte, Llanigon.
- Llangoed Hall, area information, see Llanthomas Motte.

Other online sites that reference Llanthomas Castle Mound include:

- Life in Hay - Touring the Local Ancient Monuments.
- Wiki Loves Monuments 2024 in Wales, see Llanigon, Llanthomas Castle Mound.
- Open Street Map.
- Mapy.com, see Llanthomas Castle Mound (Castle)
- Landscape Britain has a radar map of the Llanthomas Castle Mound terrain.
- Llanigon War Memorial, see motte and bailey castle.
- Ancient OS maps for 1888, see tumulus 370.
- Images of Llanthomas Castle Mound.
- Motte (Internet) weather station.

== Hay Lordship ==
The second Norman invasion of Wales was successful (1081-1094), unlike the first invasion (1067–1081). It was led by the Norman lord Bernard de Neufmarché (c.1050–c.1125). Brycheiniog (part of mid-Wales) was conquered between 1088 and 1095. Brycheiniog was divided into lesser lordships, and gifted to the knights (called knights fees) who contributed to the conquest.

In the middle ages the Marcher lordships of Wales were based on administrative and/or geographical areas. The lordship of Hay (Haysland) was divided into English Hay (Englishry/Haia Anglicana) and Welsh Hay (Welshry/Haia Wallensis). Welsh Hay included the parish/village of Llanigon and all high ground above 200 metres, extending past Hay Bluff to Capel-y-ffin (the hamlet of Glynfach). English Hay covered the low-lying fortified town of Hay and the flat land around it including Llanthomas (or Thomaschurch). Whilst the Lanthomas lordship was geographically located in the parish of Llanigon (hence the Ministry of Work's castle name Hay Rural), the lordship was actually an enclave of English Hay (hence Cathcart King's castle name Hay 3).

Motte and bailey castles were a vital Norman defensive architecture. A castle would have been built soon after the lordship was allocated to a knight. The Hay lordship owned by William Revel, one of Bernard de Neufmarché knights. Revel is thought to have built Hay Tump, near St Mary's Church, Hay-on-Wye. St. Mary's was separated from the ancient parish of St. Eigon's (Llanigon) around 1115.

== Llanthomas Lordship ==
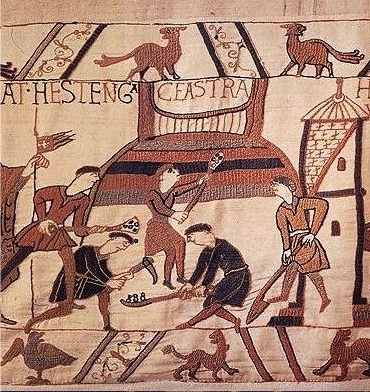
Bayeux Tapestry - Building of a motte-and-bailey castle in Hastings

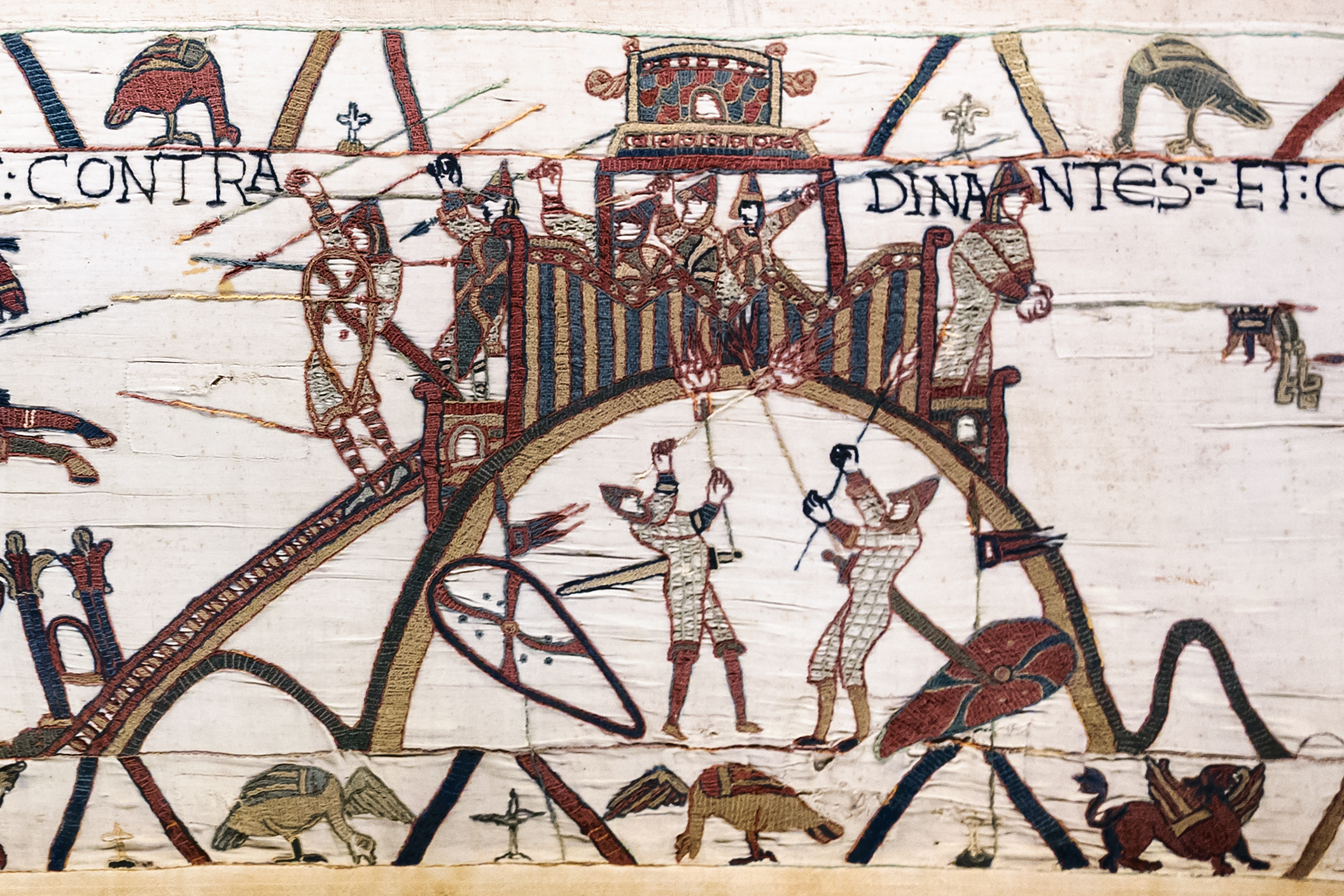
Bayeux Tapestry - Motte Castle Dinan

In post-conquest times the lord of Lanthomas had to pay a rent in the form of guarding Hay castle (now Hay Tump). This required 20 days a year of garrison duty.

By the 14th century the Llanthomas lordship was known as Llanthomas manor. The manor had considerable land including Llanthomas Castle Mound, farmland, orchards (PRN 78372, 2586, 139277) etc. By 1340, Llanthomas is known to have had a chapel of ease (PRN 81681). This was a proprietary church which might have been associated with St. Eigons in Llanigon. The chapel was located near the domicile of the lord of the manor. In modern times the chapel is located in a field behind the closed Llanigon primary school. The proprietary church was funded by the lord of the manor, who provided its vicar with a stipend making the chapel financially independent of the diocese in the established church. Documented references to the proprietary church had disappeared by the 18th century.

Paul Remfry a local historian has suggested that one of the first lords of the manor may have been the English Earl, William de Ferrers (c.1138- c.1189), Earl of Derby and a Knight Templar. Primary and secondary sources show that there were many high-status owners (or feudal tenants). This included descendants of the Devereux family who fought with William the Conqueror at the Battle of Hastings. It is believed that the Devereux family had several estates in Herefordshire since the time of King John, if not earlier. From the Norman era through to the Victorian era, the Llanthomas lordship has been home to the nobility, the wealthy and the infamous, including:

- Sir Walter Devereux (c.1361–1402) of Bodenham and Weobley. MP for Hereford.
- Sir Walter Devereux (1387–1419) of Bodenham.
- Lord Walter Devereux (1488–1558) Earl Ferrers, 10th Baron Ferrers of Chartley,1st Viscount Hereford and a Knight of the Garter.
- William Thomas (c.1524–1554) MP for Downton, Wiltshire.
- Lady Lettice Devereux, née Knollys (1543–1634) Viscountess Hereford and Countess of Leicester.
- Lord Walter Devereux (1541–1576) 2nd Viscount Hereford, 11th Baron Ferrers of Chartley. He owned Bodenham, Pipton and Llanthomas.
- William Watkins (died 1702), Officer in the Parliamentarian army.
- Esquire Thynne Howe Gwynne (c.1780–1855) Lieutenant in the Regiment of the Dragoon Guards and Sheriff for Breconshire.
- Sir William Pilkington (1775–1850) 8th Pilkington Baronet.
- William Jones Thomas (1811–1886) vicar at St. Eigon, Llanigon and justice of the peace for Hereford, Brecon and Radnor.

Over the last millennium the Llanthomas lordship has been known as Llanthomas or Llanthomas estate, or Llanthomas manor. The main domicile has been known as Llanthomas house or Llanthomas mansion or Llanthomas hall.

Lloyd provides a detailed geographical description of the estate around the start of the 19th century, before many parts were sold off. In Victorian times, the Llanthomas estate was described as a rectangle of land. The length was the modern single carriage section and some of the dual carriage way section of Llanthomas lane. The breadth was from the modern Old Forge to Cy Terrig (formerly the Vicarage for St. Eigon). Since then parts of the original lordship have been sold, including the land around Llanthomas Castle Mound (and Bailey) was sold for farming. In recent times the original Llanthomas lordship includes Llanthomas Castle Mound and 18th/19th century private dwellings including Glandwr, Ty-mawr, Llanthomas cottage, Llanthomas farm, Llanthomas hall (built on the site of the original hall), Llanthomas lodge, Llanthomas gardens and Walnut Tree Cottage etc.

== Notable people ==
- Saint Eigen (sometimes spelt as Eurgen, Eurgain or Eurgan) was the daughter of Caratacus. She lived in Trefynys (now Llanthomas), possibly around the end of the 1st century. Caratacus led the British resistance to the Roman conquest in AD 43. Caratacus and his family were captured and taken to Rome, where they converted to Christianity. After their release, Caratacus, Saint Eigen, Saint Cyllin and Saint Ilid returned to Wales. It has been suggested that Saint Eigen assisted the early entry of Christianity into Britain.
- John Leyland (1503–1552) was a Tudor antiquarian, poet, archaeologist, and chaplain to Henry VIII. John visited Llanthomas Castle Mound in the 16th century. He died young, suffering from mental illness in his latter days. The notes of his visits were available to William Camden and other antiquarians. The notes were formally published at the start of the 20th century. He is known as the father of English local history and is a primary source for British history scholars.
- Canon William Edward Thomas Morgan (1847–1940) succeeded William Jones Thomas as vicar at St. Eigon, Llanigon. William Morgan was the best man at the wedding of Francis Kilvert to Elizabeth Rowland and he is mentioned in the Francis Kilvert's Diaries of 1870-1879.

Antiquarian sources suggest that the following lived in Llanthomas either as owner or tenant:

- William de Ferre Earl of Derby (c.1138–c.1189) was married to Sibyl de Braose (died c.1227), the daughter of William de Braose, 3rd Lord of Bramber (a Marcher lord) and Bertha of Hereford. William took part in the failed rebellion against Henry II.
- Sir Walter Devereux (c.1361–1402) was a knight during the reigns of Richard II and Henry IV. He married Agnes de Crophull. Records in 1402 show that Walter held the manors of Brilley, Pipton, Thomascherche (i.e. Llanthomas/Llanigon) and part of La Hay (i.e. Hay-on-Wye).
- Sir Walter Devereux (1387–1419) of Bodenham was a knight during the reigns of Henry IV and Henry V. He married Elizabeth Bromwich. He inherited only part of the lands of his father when he came of age. His mother, Agnes de Crophull held the majority of his estates in dower during Walter's lifetime. It is not known whether Agnes or Walter owned Llanthomas.
- Lord Walter Devereux (1488–1558) was an English courtier and parliamentarian. Walter was made a Knight of the Garter by Henry VIII of England. Walter inherited the Llanthomas lordship in 1509. He was Chief Justice of South Wales and Chamberlain of South Wales, Carmarthen, and Cardigan. He was steward of the household in Ludlow of Mary Princess of Wales.
- William Thomas (c.1524-1554) was from Llanigon. He was a politician, a scholar, (on Italian history and language) and a clerk of the Privy Council under Edward VI. He became MP for Downton, Wiltshire in 1553. An avowed Protestant, he was found guilty of treason for plotting to murder the Catholic Queen Mary I in Wyatt's Rebellion. He was committed to the Tower of London. From there he was drawn upon a sled to Tyburn, where he was hanged, beheaded, and quartered. His head was placed on London Bridge.
- Lady Lettice Devereux, née Knollys (1543–1634) was an English noblewomen. Lettice was married to Walter Devereux (1541–1576). On his death she married Queen Elizabeth I's favourite, Robert Dudley, Earl of Leicester (1532–1588). In a fit of jealously the Queen permanently banished Lettice from the Royal court.
- Lord Walter Devereux (1541–1576) was Lettice Devereux's first husband. He was created the 1st Earl of Essex, by Queen Elizabeth I. He was a prominent English nobleman and known for his brutal military campaigns in Ireland. Their eldest son, Robert Devereux, the 2nd Earl of Essex (1565–1601) was another favourite of Queen Elizabeth I (1533-1603).
- William Watkins (died 1702) was in the parliamentarian army against Charles I, and a "propagator of the Gospel in South Wales". In 1672 an act of parliament allowed nonconformist groups to meet in their own homes. The Llanigon Dissenters held meetings at Penyrwyrlodd, his other mansion in Llanigon. Their son John was wounded in a duel, leading to his opponent's death. Fearing capture, he hid in Hay Castle but died whilst searching for a safer hiding place. His widow lived in Llanthomas until her death in 1734. A Watkins descendent also called William Watkins, lived in Llanthomas in 1772.
- James Jones High Sheriff of Brecknockshire (in 1810) sold Llanthomas estate (including its farm) and Llwyn Llwyd farm in Llanigon to Thynne Howe Gwynne in July 1814.
- Esquire Thynne Howe Gwynne (c.1780-1855) was married to the Honourable Georgianna Marianna Devereux, daughter of George the 13th Viscount Hereford of Tregoyd. He "modernized with great taste, forming a handsome and prominent object in the scenery of the village, close to which it is situated".
- Sir William Pilkington (1775–1850) family sold Llanthomas estate to the Reverend William Jones-Thomas in 1858.
- Reverend William Jones Thomas (1811–1886) was vicar at St. Eigon, Llanigon. He is remembered for his rejection of Francis Kilvert as a suitor for one of his five daughters. There are many references to the Thomas family in the Francis Kilvert's Diaries of 1870-1879. William and his descendants were to be the last owners of the Llanthomas estate and hall. They sold the estate land and the contents of the hall to pay off accumulated debts. The hall was demolished in 1954. A modern home has been built on part of the footing of the old hall.

== Antiquarian sources ==
- Leyland, John (1906). The itinerary in Wales, 1536-1539 (Lucy Toulmin Smith ed.).
- Jones, Theophilus (1805), A history of the county of Brecknock, Vol 1.
- Jones, Theophilus (1809), A history of the county of Brecknock, Vol 2.
- Lewis, Samuel (1834). A topographical dictionary of Wales, Vol 1.
- Lewis, Samuel (1834). A topographical dictionary of Wales, Vol 2.
- Poole, Edwin (1886). The Illustrated History and Biography of Brecknockshire from the Earliest Times to the Present Day.
- Lloyd, John Edward (1903). Historical memoranda of Breconshire; a collection of papers from various sources relating to the history of the county.

== Modern sources ==
- Remfry, Paul Martin (1999, p 122). Castles of Breconshire: No. 8. Herefordshire: Logaston Press. ISBN 978-1-873827-80-2.
- Salter, Mike (2001, p 29). The Castles of Mid Wales (2nd ed.). Folly Publications. ISBN 1-871731-48-8.
- Morgan, Gerald (2013, p 232). Castles in Wales - a Handbook (1st ed.). Y Lolfa. ISBM 978-1-84771-031-4.

== Selected journal sources ==
- D. J. Cathcart King |(1961). The Castles of Breconshire.
- D. J. Cathcart King (1984). Castellarium Anglicanum: An Index and Bibliography of the Castles in England, Wales, and the Islands: Vols 1–2.
- Dorling. P. (1988). Llanthomas Motte. Llanigon. Archaeology in Wales.
- Ministry of Works (1961). List Of Ancient Monuments In England And Wales.
