= Francis Kilvert (antiquary) =

English cleric, schoolmaster, antiquary and literary editor

Francis Kilvert (1793–1863) was an English cleric, schoolmaster, antiquary, and literary editor.

== Life ==
Born at Westgate Street, Bath, Somerset on Good Friday 1793, he was the eldest son of Francis Kilvert, coachmaker, and Anna his wife; his uncle was Richard Kilvert, domestic chaplain to Bishop Richard Hurd and rector of Hartlebury. Orphaned while still young, and the eldest of seven sons, he became guardian to his brothers. For a time he was educated under Dr. Michael Rowlandson at Hungerford. He then went to the Bath grammar school, where Nathaniel Morgan had him as an assistant. He matriculated at Worcester College, Oxford, on 6 November 1811, and graduated B.A. in 1819 and M.A. in 1824.

Kilvert was ordained deacon by Richard Beadon, bishop of Bath and Wells, in 1816, and priest in 1817; his first curacy was at Claverton, near Bath. He declined the post of principal of Queen's College, Birmingham, stayed in Bath, and took on minor posts, including minister of St. Mary Magdalen's Chapel, chaplain of the General Hospital, and evening lecturer at St. Mary's, Bathwick. His main income came from keeping pupils.

In 1837 Kilvert bought Claverton Lodge, on the southern slope of Bathwick Hill, where he took scholars for the rest of his life. Kilvert was one of the earliest members of the Bath Literary Club. He died at Claverton Lodge on 16 September 1863, and was buried in Old Widcombe churchyard, near the grave of his father and two of his brothers. A brass tablet to his memory was placed on the walls of St. Mary, Bathwick.

== Works ==
Kilvert wrote:

- Sermons at Christ Church, Bath, before the National Schools, 1827.
- Sermons at St. Mary's Church, Bathwick, 1837.
- Sermon preached at Wrington, 1840.
- Selections from unpublished Papers of Bishop Warburton, 1841; also issued in same year as vol. xiv. (supplemental), of William Warburton's Works.
- Pinacothecæ Historicæ specimen. Auctore F.K., A.M., 1848; pt. ii., with name in full, 1850. A series of Latin inscriptions on illustrious men.
- Ralph Allen and Prior Park, 1857.
- Richard Graves of Claverton, 1858.
- Memoirs of Life and Writings of Bishop Hurd, 1860.

After his death there was published in 1866 a volume of his Remains in Verse and Prose, with a brief Memoir, edited by William Luke Nichols, with William Long. It included the paper on Alexander Pope's connection with the West of England, and particularly with Bath; but omitted papers read to the Bath Literary Society, such as those on Philip Thicknesse and the Batheaston vase, were omitted. His last communication to the Bath Theological Book Society, lines on Over the Water to Warleigh, was printed by H. D. Skrine at Bath in October 1863. He was a frequent contributor to Notes and Queries, and he wrote in the Bath Chronicle.

== Family ==
Kilvert married at the close of 1822 Adelaide Sophia de Chièvre, of French refugee extraction, then living at Clapham, near London. She published in 1841 a work on Home Discipline (reissued with fresh title-pages in 1843 and 1847). They had three daughters.

== Notes ==
Attribution

This article incorporates text from a publication now in the public domain: Lee, Sidney, ed. (1892). "Kilvert, Francis". Dictionary of National Biography. Vol. 31. London: Smith, Elder & Co.
