= William Jones Thomas =

Welsh Anglican priest

Reverend William Jones Thomas (1811–1886) was a 19th-century Welsh Anglican priest. He was vicar at the pre-conquest church of St. Eigon, Llanigon, Wales.

St. Eigon is in the Greater Brecon Deanery, in the Diocese of Swansea and Brecon, in the Church in Wales (an independent member of the Anglican Communion). Before 1923, the diocese was in the Archdeaconry of Brecon within the Diocese of St Davids.

== Alma mater ==
- 1835 BA Peterhouse, Cambridge University.
- 1838 MA Petershouse, Cambridge University.

== Ordained ministry ==
- 1836 Deacon, ordained in Exeter.
- 1837 Priest, ordained by the Bishop of Exeter.
- 1836-1838 Curate, Kilmington, Devon.
- 1836-1843 Curate, Titley, Herefordshire.
- 1838-1846 Curate, Llanelwedd, Powys.
- 1843-1847 Curate, Kington, Herefordshire.
- 1847-1849 Curate, Presteigne, Radnorshire.
- 1848-1853 Curate, Forden, Powys.
- 1855-1859 Rector, Gladestry, Radnorshire.
- 1859-1886 Vicar at St. Eigon, Llanigon, Powys.

see Crockfords clerical directory.

== Miscellaneous ==
- JP for Hereford, Brecon and Radnor.
- Chairman of Hay and Clyro Petty Sessional Divisions.
- Vice-chairman of the Hay Board of Guardians.

== Personal life ==
In 1839, William married Anne Elizabeth (nee Jones) Thomas (1812-1884). He followed the Thomas tradition of marrying a wealthy heiress. William and Anne had five daughters and six sons. None of the daughters married, and lived in Llanthomas until their death.

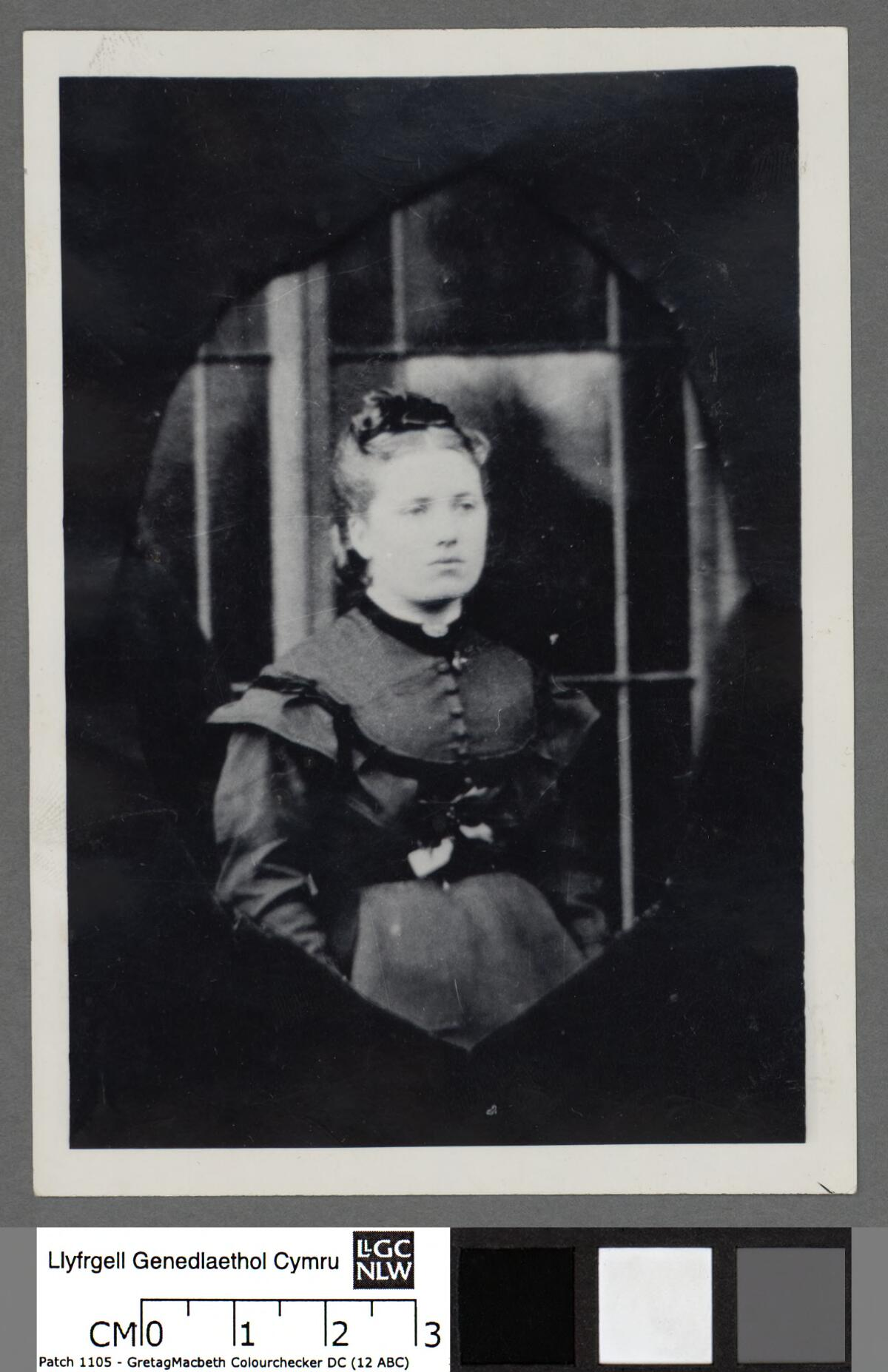
A portrait from the Welsh Portrait Collection at the National Library of Wales. Frances Eleanor Thomas of Llanthomas

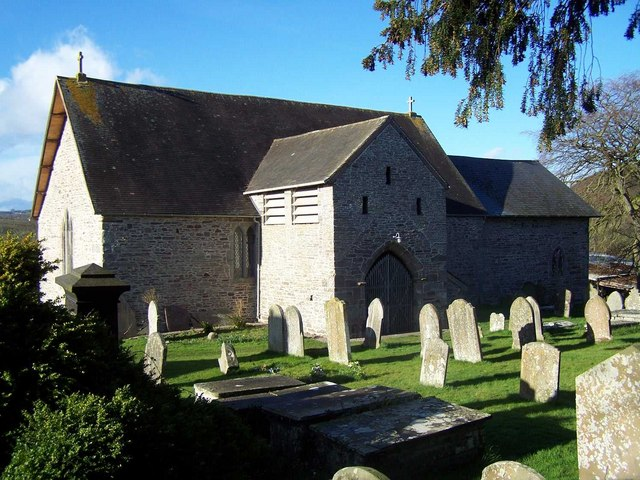
The Thomas family grave is in the graveyard, facing the Chancel i.e. on the extreme right above.

The parents, the five daughters, one son (William) and other family members are buried in the family grave in the St. Eigon, Llanigon graveyard. The daughters are: Mary Elizabeth (1844–86), Grace Catherine Anne (1846-1909), Edith Burnam (1849-1920), Frances Eleanor Jane (1853-1928) aka Daisy, and Charlotte Alice Thomas (1848-1933).

The eldest son William Jones Thomas (1839-1909) was a JP and Lieutenant Colonel in the Third Battalion South Wales Borderers. He never married and was the only son to die in Llanthomas. The remaining brothers died elsewhere and are buried in various locations:

- Nicholas Charles Scudamore Thomas (c.1850-1873). Died of typhoid in Rome. He never married.
- Edward Lechmere Thomas (1845-1878). Died of cholera in Ceylon. Married to Nina de Winton, they had 2 children Edward Lechmere Thomas and Walter Frederick Thomas.
- Walter Sandys Thomas (1853-1899). Died of psilosis in Ceylon. Married to Violet, they had 3 children Walter Sandys Thomas, Eileen Sandys (Thomas) Garnons-Williams and Charles Ivor Thomas.
- John David Cove (Thomas) Pateshall (1841-1911). Was a Lieutenant in the Cheshire Regiment. Died in an asylum in Kent with a psychotic condition, possibly schizophrenia. He never married.
- Henry Evan (Thomas) Pateshall (1842-1912), was a Lieutenant Colonel in the East Yorkshire Regiment. Died of influenza in Allensmore estate which he inherited from his mother's side of the family. Married Alice Mabel Davies, they had 2 children Henry Evan (Thomas) Pateshall and Alice Murial Pateshall.

== Llanthomas estate in the Victorian and Edwardian eras ==
In 1858, William bought the Llanthomas estate from Sir William Pilkington (1775–1850, 8th Pilkington Baronet) for £8000. William's annual stipend was a mere £100 per year, but his wife Anne came from a wealthy family, her mothers maiden name was Pateshall, an ancient family traceable to Norman times. The domicile for the estate was called Llanthomas hall. It was originally a Welsh long house but was upgraded to a grand three story mansion at great expense. Bay windows and a stone portico supported by stone columns were added. The mansion had servants including a cook, kitchen maid and house maid etc.

Some historians suggest that William may have been related to his Tudor namesake William Thomas (c.1524-1554), a previous owner of Llanthomas. The Tudor William Thomas was an avowed protestant. He was found guilty of treason for plotting to murder the Catholic Queen Mary I. He was committed to the Tower of London. From there he was drawn upon a sled to Tyburn, where he was hanged, beheaded, and quartered. His head was placed on London Bridge. Related or not, the Victorian William Thomas probably knew about this part of the estates history, which may have piqued his interest.

Until the death of William and Anne, the Thomas family lived comfortably, possibly at a cost to their daughters prospects. None of the daughters married, not least because William rejected suitors for three of their five daughters, possibly because the suitors were not wealthy enough to help sustain the upkeep of Llanthomas and their comfortable lifestyle:

- Reverend Robert Francis Kilvert (1840–1879) who was the curate of Clyro. In 1871, he sought permission to marry Frances
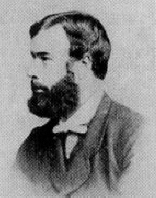
  Portrait of the English diarist Robert Francis Kilvert (1840–1879)
  Eleanor Jane Thomas. Kilvert nicknamed her Daisy, and her family nicknamed her Fanny. William, the Thomas family and Kilverts visits to Llanthomas are mentioned in Francis Kilvert's Diaries of 1870-1879. The rejection by Thomas is pivotal in the modern day interest in of Kilvert. The story of unrequited love (ala Twelfth Night) of a country curate who died young, has inspired articles, academic thesis, books, the 2019 BBC TV series Kilvert's Diary, and the still active Kilvert Society. Thanks to William Thomas the name Kilvert remains a marketing asset to many local businesses.
- Reverend William E.T. Morgan (1847–1940) who was the curate of Glasbury, and became the Vicar of St. Eigon (1887-1923), the successor to William. He sought permission to marry Charlotte Alice Thomas.
- The suitor for the hand of Grace Catherine Anne Thomas is unknown. The rejection may have led to her mental health issues. She was committed to a private asylum.

Some believe that the dowries of the Thomas daughters was used to pay for substantial additions that William made to Llanthomas hall and their comfortable lifestyle. Conversely, others believe that William spared his daughters from the dangers of serial pregnancies, and they lived a materially privileged and secure existence.

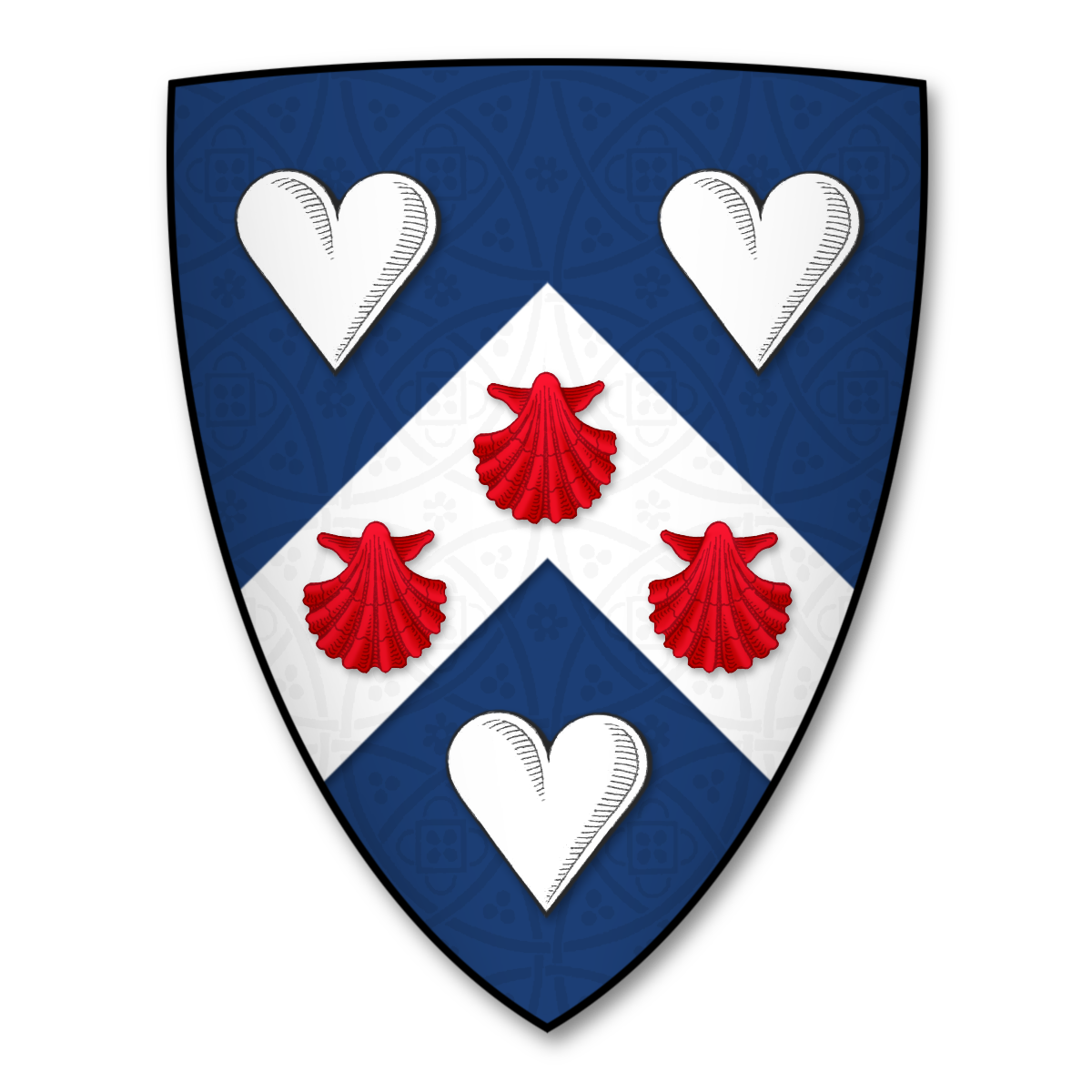
PATESHALL family of Allensmore, Herefordshire

In Victorian times the practice of exchanging surnames for inheritance purposes was common. A family-line struggling to produce male heirs would select an heir from among the available supply of male relatives by marriage, resulting in double-barrelled names. William gave five of his eleven children the Pateshall name, or Pateshall-associated, middle names. William was alert to the possibility of the future inheritance of the Allensmore estate (four miles south-west of Hereford) and the right to bear the name and the Pateshall coat of arms. His plan for sustaining Llanthomas estate failed, despite having eleven children, like the Pateshall's they were not fruitful. By the time inheritance became possible, four sons were dead, one in an asylum. The only surviving son (Henry Evan) inherited both estates, however, he died within a year. His son also called Henry Evan (following the naming tradition for first sons) could not finance both estates. He in turn had a son who died young when "the fire seems to have gone out of the Pateshall line". Allensmore court which was the domicile of Allensmore estate was demolished and sold for scrap in 1960.

By the time William Thomas died (1886), he had spent the bulk of his wife's fortune improving Llanthomas (estate and hall). Death duties and ever-growing upkeep of the house and estate was passed on to the children of William and Anne. Llanthomas was inherited by descendants and wider family members. However, they not could prevent Llanthomas hall from becoming dilapidated following a growing list of urgent repairs. For example, the unusual technology of an acetylene heating and lighting system. Parts of the estate were sold to raise income. In 1922, the farm was sold for £3000 to Mr. Thomas Jones Davies. During the Second World War Llanthomas hall was used to house the pupils of a London girls’ school. However, after the war the upkeep of Llanthomas became too great a burden. In 1954, Llanthomas hall was demolished. Its contents including tons of roof lead was sold to pay off debts.

The Coflein online database, known as the National Monuments Record of Wales (NMRW) stored in the National Library of Wales in Aberystwyth have archived records for Llanthomas hall: NPRN: 25787

== Llanthomas estate in the modern era ==
William Thomas and his descendants were unable to sustain the estate that had a heritage going back to the second Norman invasion of Wales, a millennium ago. However, their influence lives on, several current private properties are linked to the estate:

- Llanthomas House was built in the 1990s on the footing of the demolished Llanthomas Hall (formerly known as Llanthomas Mansion or Llanthomas House).
- Llanthomas Cottage was occupied by the Thomas family gardener who witnessed Kilvert's proposal of marriage, however, as he was deaf, he did not hear the proposal! The cottage had a hydraulic ram which was used to transfer water from Digeddi brook to Llanthomas gardens.
- Llanthomas Lodge was used as the Thomas family laundry.
- Llanthomas Gardens was used as the Thomas family walled kitchen garden.
- Llanthomas Castle Mound and was part of the Norman Llanthomas lordship, a sub-lordship of the Hay lordship. Llanthomas Castle Mound was built in the late 11th or early 12th century.

Llanthomas is a now a small geographical area within the village of Llanigon. Organised heritage visits regularly tour the "Kilvert country" which includes Llanthomas, Clyro, Hay-on-Wye, Glasbury, Llowes and Llanigon etc.

== Books ==
- Morgan, W.E.T. (1932). Hay and Neighbourhood. H.R. Grant and son.
- Toman, John (Apr 2001). Kilvert: The Homeless Heart. Logaston Press. ISBN 978-1-873827-37-6.
- Kilvert, Francis (2012). Plomer, William (ed.). Kilvert's Diary. Penguin Random House. ISBN 978-0-09-952875-3.
