= Rachel Ferrington =

British timbersports competitor

Rachel Ferrington is a British timbersports "lumberjill." She is the first British woman to represent Great Britain at the World Timbersports Championships and set a new women's world record in 2025.

== Biography ==
In 2024, Ferrington competed at the 2024 British Timbersports Championship, taking third place overall.

In June 2025, at the 2025 British Timbersports Championship, Ferrington set a new women's world record in the stock saw event, cutting two wooden "cookies" in 8.82 seconds. This qualified her to represent Great Britain at the World Timbersports Championships in Milan, Italy.

As of 2026, Ferrington is ranked 17th in The International Women's' Ranking.

Ferrington works as a facilities manager at Hay Castle in Hay-on-Wye.
