= William Edward Thomas Morgan =

Welsh Anglican priest

Reverend William Edward Thomas Morgan (1847–1940) was a 19th-century Welsh Anglican priest. He was vicar at the pre-conquest church of St. Eigon, Llanigon, Wales.

St. Eigon is in the Greater Brecon Deanery, in the Diocese of Swansea and Brecon, in the Church in Wales (an independent member of the Anglican Communion). Before 1923, the diocese was in the Archdeaconry of Brecon within the Diocese of St Davids.

== Alma mater ==
- 1870 BA St. Davids College, Lampeter.

== Ordained ministry ==
- 1871 Deacon.
- 1872 Priest.
- 1871-1878 Curate, Llanyre, Llandrindod Wells.
- 1878-1880 Curate, Glasbury.
- 1887-1923 Vicar at St. Eigon, Llanigon, Powys.
- 1918 Elected member of the governing body of the Church in Wales.
- 1915-1925 Rural Dean of Hay.
- 1923 Chaplain to the Bishop of Swansea and Brecon.
- 1930 Canon Emeritus for Brecon Cathedral.

See Crockfords clerical directory.

== Scholarship ==
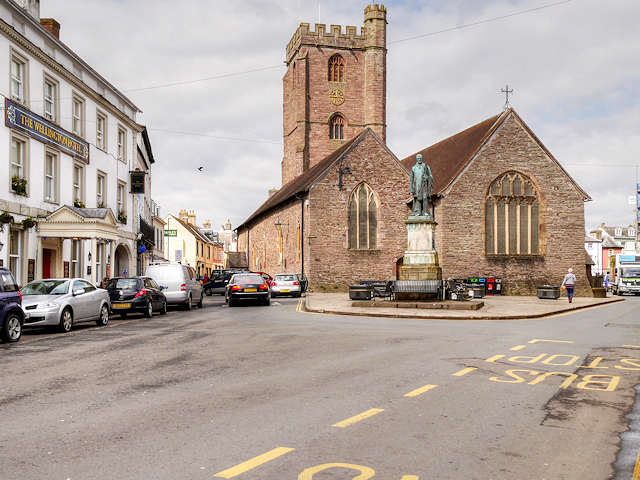
St Mary the Virgin, Brecon

William was an active Welsh scholar throughout his long life. He wrote articles for the Woolhope Naturalists' Field Club, the Archaeologia Cambrensis, the Brecknock Society and others. He focused on archaeology, local history, Welsh place names and the folklore of Breconshire and Radnorshire. His research on folklore has been cited by other authors. He contributed a list of Welsh words to the English Dialect Society. He wrote a book entitled "Hay and Neighbourhood", which revealed that churches once had door flaps for cats and dogs e.g. the south porch of St. Mary the Virgin, Brecon.

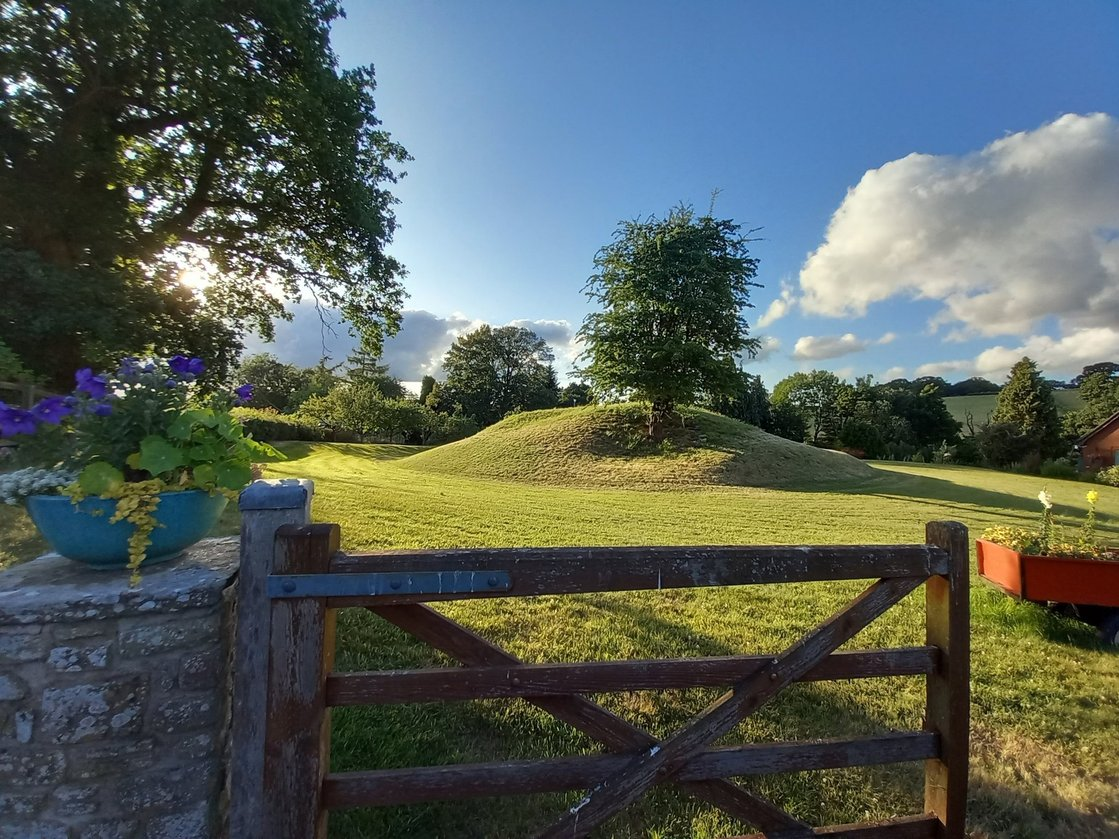
Llanthomas Castle Mound

William was an amateur archaeologist. He was the vice-secretary of the Woolhope club for many years. He discovered a Neolithic long barrow at Pen-y-Wyrlod near Llanigon. With a fellow member of the Woolhope club (i.e. George Marshal FSA) they carried out a partial excavation. The Pen-y-Wyrlod site is described as a prehistoric scheduled monument. Human burial bones and teeth were found for babies, multiple children and male/female adults of various ages. The also found artefacts including a Roman coin (Crispus A.D. 317–326), wire-wound Romano-Egyptian blue beads and Beaker pottery with flint flakes. The long barrow is a Cadw scheduled monument (see report BR012). Cadw describe the long barrow as of "national importance for its potential to enhance our knowledge of prehistoric burial and ritual practices". The Coflein online database, known as the National Monuments Record of Wales (NMRW) stored in the National Library of Wales in Aberystwyth have archived records for the long barrow: (NPRN: 92012) including: 6191330, 6356026, 6482821, 6482823, 6482820, 6482822, 6482819, 6482817, 6182693, 6028530, 6059830, 6482816, 6057527, 6517110, 6381218, 6392227, 6457168, 6182692, 6482818, 6151010. In conjunction with the Woolhope club, William conducted many local archaeological activities including a brief excavation on Llanthomas Castle Mound.

William's community involvement included membership of the Hay Rural Council on the Brecon education committee, he was secretary of the Hay book club for 30 years, and he was secretary to the Brecon Archidiaconal Charity.

== Personal life ==
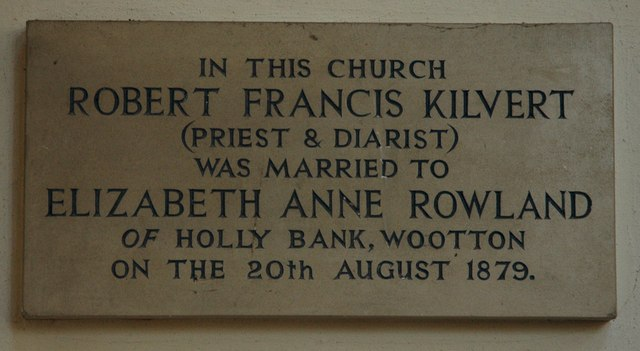
Plaque on the north wall in Wootton church commemorates the marriage of Robert Kilvert and Elizabeth Rowland (20 Aug 1879).

William was an amateur athlete. He was a keen cricketer playing for Hay Cricket club when he was over 60. His highest score was 97 against Penybont. He was a founder member of Newbridge (on Wye) Cricket Club. He also played tennis, and was secretary of the local archery club, the Wyeside bowmen.

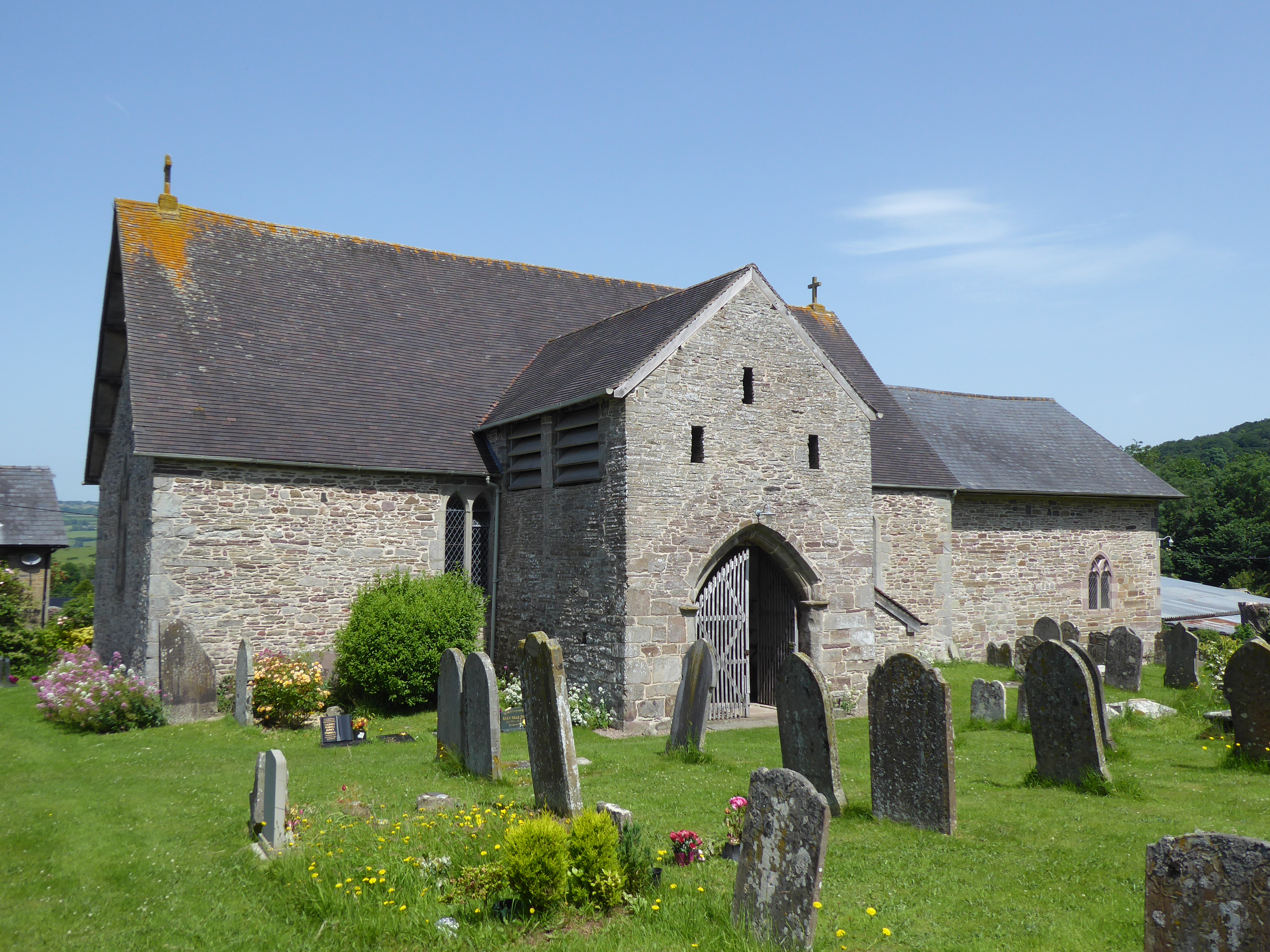
William's grave is to the right of the St. Eigon porch.

William was rejected as a suitor for one of the daughters of the Reverend William Jones Thomas i.e. Charlotte Alice Thomas (1848–1933). William Morgan never married, instead he immersed himself in his priestly, community, and scholarly duties. He remained in close contact with all the Thomas family throughout his life. In 1911, the surviving Thomas family members resided temporarily in the Llanigon vicarage as guests of William as they awaited repairs to their home, Llanthomas hall.

In 1871, Reverend Francis Kilvert was also rejected as a suitor for another of the daughters of the William Thomas i.e. Frances Eleanor Jane Thomas (1853–1928). In 1879, Morgan was the best man at the wedding of Francis Kilvert to Elizabeth Rowland. William Morgan and William Thomas (and his family) are mentioned in the Kilvert's diaries.

William succeeded William Thomas as vicar at St. Eigon. William is buried in the St. Eigon, Llanigon graveyard, just to right of the entrance porch. Williams grave is not far from Charlotte Thomas who is buried in the Thomas family grave in front of the Chancel.

== Books ==
- Morgan, W.E.T. (1932). Hay and Neighbourhood. H.R. Grant and son.
- Palmer, Roy (2001). Folklore of Radnorshire. Logaston Press. ISBN 1-873827-17-2.
- Biggs, C.S. (1997). An Inventory of the Ancient Monuments in Brecknock (Brycheiniog), The Prehistoric and Roman Monuments, Part i: Later Prehistoric Monuments and Unenclosed Settlements to 1000 A.D. RCAHMW. pp. 60–62. ISBN 978-0-11-300003-6.
- Toman, John (Apr 2001). Kilvert: The Homeless Heart. Logaston Press. ISBN 978-1-873827-37-6.
- Kilvert, Francis (2012). Plomer, William (ed.). Kilvert's Diary. Penguin Random House. ISBN 978-0-09-952875-3.
