= Roger Garnons Williams =

Welsh cricketer and British Army officer

Personal information
- Full name: Roger Fenton Garnons Williams
- Born: 13 August 1891; Chelsea, Middlesex, England
- Died: 15 January 1961 (aged 69); Midhurst, Sussex, England
- Batting: Unknown
- Bowling: Unknown

Domestic team information
- Years: Team
- 1923/24–1927/28: Europeans
- 1926/27: Indian Army

Career statistics
Competition	First-class
Matches	5
Runs scored	178
Batting average	19.77
100s/50s	–/–
Top score	40
Balls bowled	84
Wickets	1
Bowling average	48.00
5 wickets in innings	–
10 wickets in match	–
Best bowling	1/11
Catches/stumpings	6/–
- Source: Cricinfo, 9 November 2021

Roger Fenton Garnons Williams MBE (13 August 1891 – 15 January 1961) was a Welsh first-class cricketer and an officer in the British Army.

The son of the Welsh rugby union international and army officer Richard Garnons Williams, he was born at Chelsea in August 1891 and was educated at Winchester College. Serving in the British Army, Garnons Williams was initially commissioned as a second lieutenant in the South Wales Borderers, later transferring to the Royal Fusiliers during the First World War. He gained one promotion during the war, being made a lieutenant in November 1917 and served as an adjutant. He saw action in the Mesopotamian campaign during the war, service for which he was made an MBE in September 1921. An acting captain by 1921, he served in British India in the 1920s.

He played first-class cricket in India, playing for the Europeans cricket team on three occasions between 1924 and 1928, in addition to making an appearance each for the Indian Army cricket team against the touring Marylebone Cricket Club in 1926 and for the Punjab Governor's XI against Northern India in 1928. In five first-class matches, he scored 178 runs with a highest score of 40, while with the ball he took one wicket. He was made a brevet major in January 1933 and gained the rank in full in March 1937. He retired from active service in September 1938. Garnons Williams died at Midhurst in January 1961.
