= Llanigon =

Village and community in Powys, Wales

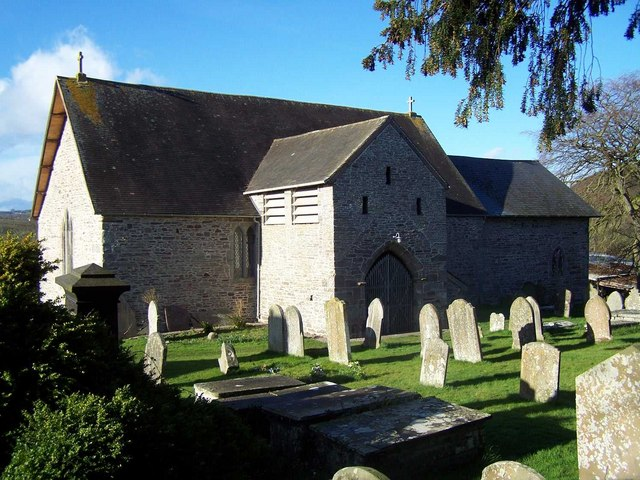
- St Eigon's Church

- Location within Powys
- Population: 478
- Principal area: Powys
- Preserved county: Powys
- Country: Wales
- Sovereign state: United Kingdom
- Post town: HEREFORD
- Postcode district: HR3
- Dialling code: 01497
- Police: Dyfed-Powys
- Fire: Mid and West Wales
- Ambulance: Welsh
- UK Parliament: Brecon, Radnor and Cwm Tawe
- Senedd Cymru – Welsh Parliament: Brecon & Radnorshire
- List of places UK Wales Powys 52.05482°N 3.15010°W Community map: Map of the community

Llanigon is a village and community in Powys, Wales on the edge of the Brecon Beacons National Park, north of the Black Mountains, Wales. The community population was 478. The nearest town is Hay-on-Wye, some 1.5 miles (2 km) to the east. It is in the historic county of Brecknockshire.

== History ==
The church of St. Eigon was either dedicated to the 1st-century St. Eigon (daughter of Cartatacus) or more likely the 6th-century St. Eigion (brother of St Cynidr). The Saint Eigon interpretation inspired Barbara Erskine's novel The Warrior's Princess, partly set in Llanigon.

Oral tradition in the parish of St. Eigon suggests that St. Paul crossed Gospel Pass in order to visit Caratacus. St. Eigon and her father may have met St. Paul whilst in Rome. Some say that St. Eigon is the Claudia mentioned by Saint Paul in Timothy II. St. Eigon may be the first female British saint.

The church of St. Eigon predates the Norman Conquest, though the current building (parts of which are Norman) are somewhat later.

Llanigon contains a Norman manor formerly known as Llanthomas (or Thomas Church). It was part of the lordship of Hay. Remains of a motte and bailey castle for Llanthomas survive near the old manor house. The manor house was demolished in the 20th century.

In 1522, the manor belonged to Walter Devereux, 1st Viscount Hereford. It was said to be the birthplace of William Thomas, who died in 1554. He was a scholar of Italian and Italian history, politician and a clerk of the Privy Council under Edward VI; he was executed for treason after the collapse of Wyatt's Rebellion.

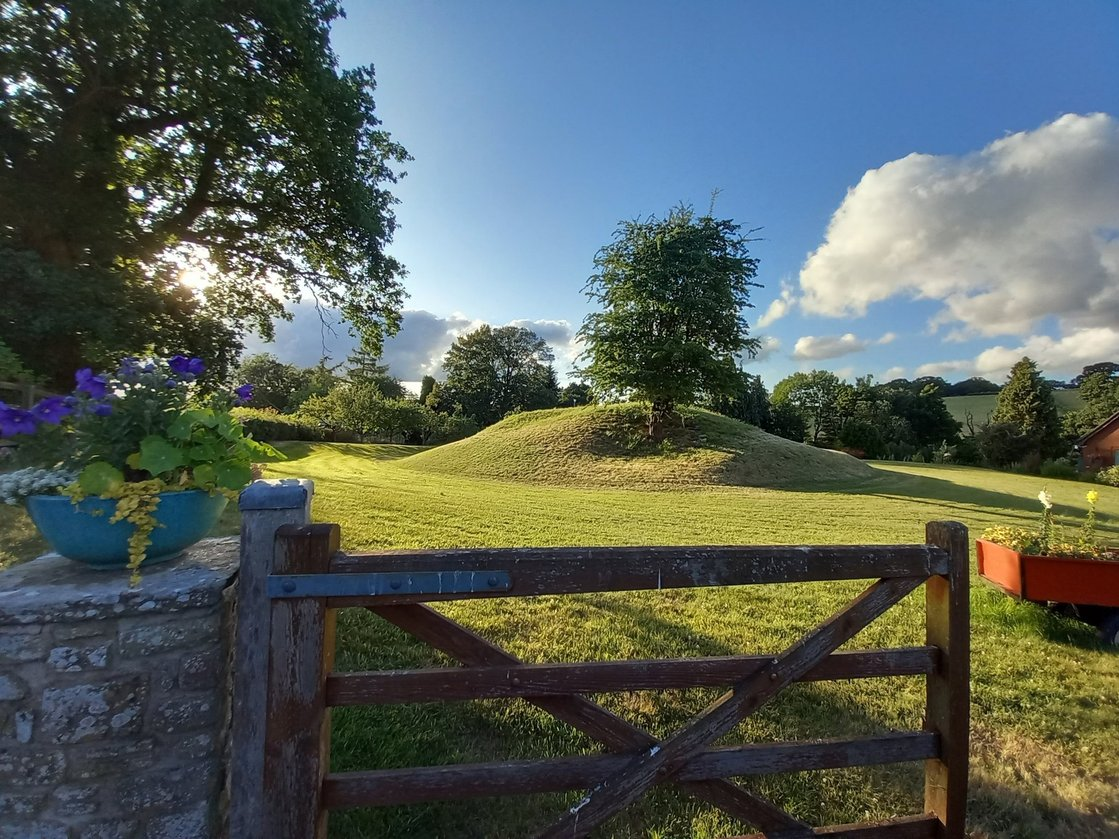
Llanthomas Castle Mound viewed from Llanthomas lane

Llwynllwyd barn, to the west of the village, was a dissenting academy in the eighteenth century. The pioneer Welsh Methodist Howell Harris and the hymn writer William Williams Pantycelyn were both educated there.

In the 1870s the diarist Rev. Francis Kilvert, curate of Clyro, was a regular visitor to the then vicar of Llanigon, the Rev. William Jones Thomas. Francis, fell in love with his daughter, Frances Eleanor Jane aka Daisy. Her father asked Kilvert not to pursue the matter, probably because as a mere curate he was not sufficiently well-placed. Kilvert noted "On this day when I proposed for the girl who will I trust one day be my wife I had only one sovereign in the world, and I owed that." Daisy never married and is buried in the Llanigon churchyard.

The successor to William Thomas as vicar of St. Eigon was the Rev. William Edward Thomas Morgan. He fell in love with Charlotte Alice, another of the Thomas daughters. Like Kilvert, he was refused permission to marry by William Thomas.
