= Richard Garnons Williams =

Welsh rugby union player and soldier (1856–1915)

Colonel Richard Garnons Williams
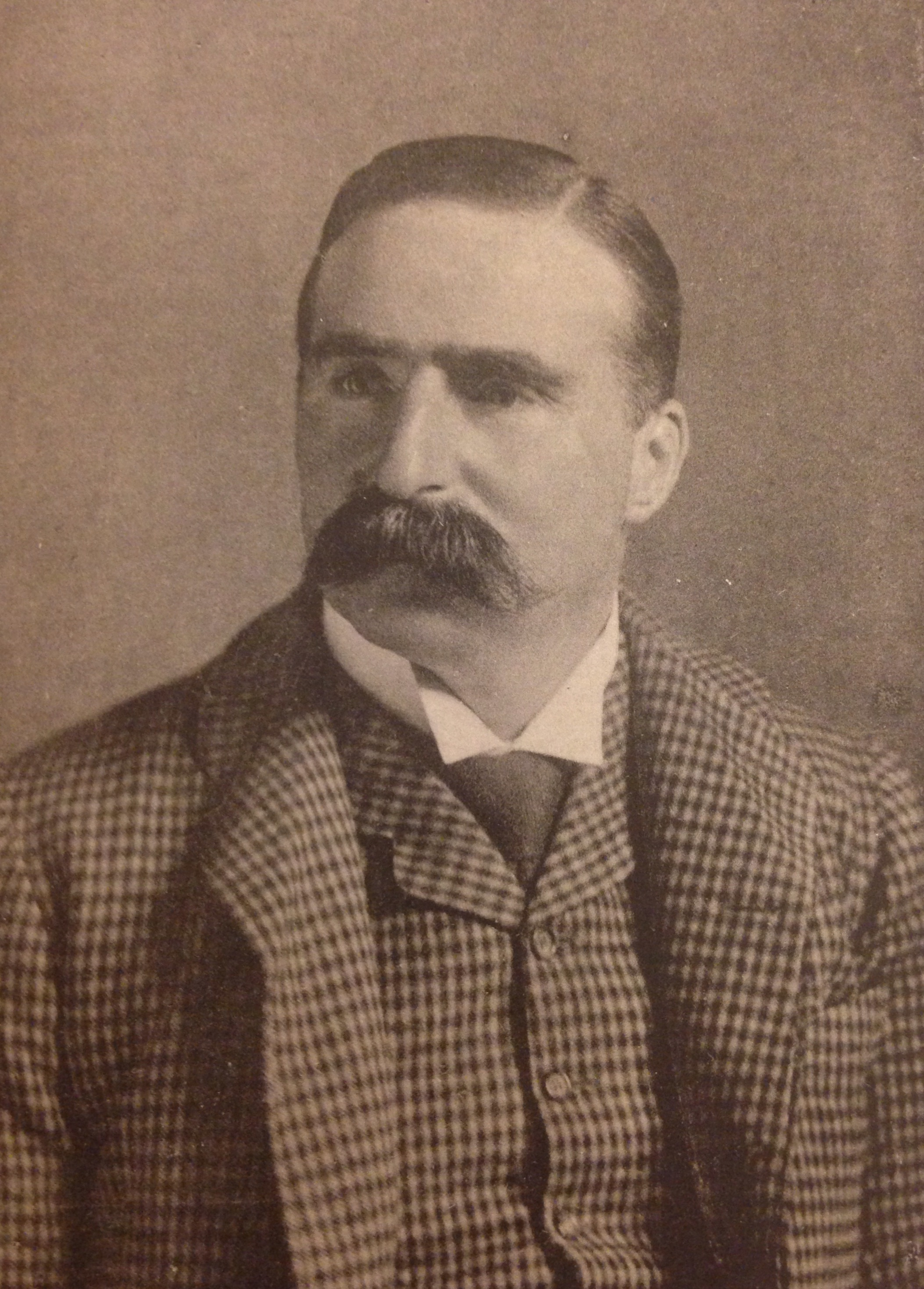
- Born: Richard Davies Garnons Williams; 15 June 1856 Llowes, Wales, UK
- Died: 27 September 1915 (aged 59) Loos, France
- School: Magdalen College School, Oxford
- University: Trinity College, Cambridge

Rugby union career
- Position: Forward
Amateur team(s)
Years	Team	Apps	(Points)
1874–1876	Cambridge University R.U.F.C.		
- Brecon RFC
1880–1881	Newport RFC	3	(0)
International career
Years	Team	Apps	(Points)
1881	Wales	1	(0)
- Military career
- Allegiance: United Kingdom
- Branch: British Army
- Rank: Lieutenant Colonel
- Commands: 12th Royal Fusiliers
- Conflicts: World War I: Battle of Loos †
- Memorials: Loos Memorial

Colonel Richard Davies Garnons Williams (15 June 1856 – 27 September 1915) (Note: Official sources say 25 September.) was a British Army officer and Welsh rugby union player who represented Wales, Brecon and Newport. He played in the first Wales international rugby union match in 1881.

Garnons Williams became an officer in the British Army in 1876, and retired from regular service in 1892, though he continued to serve in a voluntary capacity until 1906. Already aged 58 at the outbreak of the First World War, he rejoined the army and was killed in action in 1915.

== Early life and family ==
Richard Garnons Williams was born on 15 June 1856 in Llowes, Radnorshire, the second child of the Reverend Garnons Williams of Abercamlais, Powys, and his wife Catherine Frances, the daughter of Fenton Hort, of Leopardstown, Dublin, and sister of Fenton John Anthony Hort. Garnons Williams was educated at Magdalen College School, Oxford before being prepared for University by private tuition in Wimbledon, Surrey. He then went to Trinity College, Cambridge, in October 1874.

His siblings were Reverend Arthur, Richard Davies, Captain Aylmer Herbert, Gerald, Katharine Frances Helena, Annabella Mary, Hugh, who died an infant, Mark Penry Fenton, and Mary Elizabeth. Aylmer Herbert joined the Royal Navy in 1871 and, after receiving his commission in 1880, served until his retirement in 1902, having reached the rank of captain. He then took command of the training ship HMS Cornwall until 1904 when he was appointed to command the Lancashire Navy League Sea Training Home at Liscard. He died on 8 February 1916 aged 58. Gerald was married in April 1892 to Minnie Lilian Court, the youngest daughter of Major Henry Court of Iverfarne, Buckinghamshire. Mark Penry was Fleet Surgeon aboard HMS Hampshire and died when his vessel was wrecked in 1916.

Richard Garnons Williams married Alice Jessie Bircham on 8 January 1885. They had a daughter, Barbara, who married Captain Hume Buckley Roderick of the Welsh Guards on 9 November 1916. Her husband was killed in action on the Western Front in 1917. She was herself serving in France at the time. They also had a son, Roger, who played first-class cricket and served in the army.

== Rugby ==
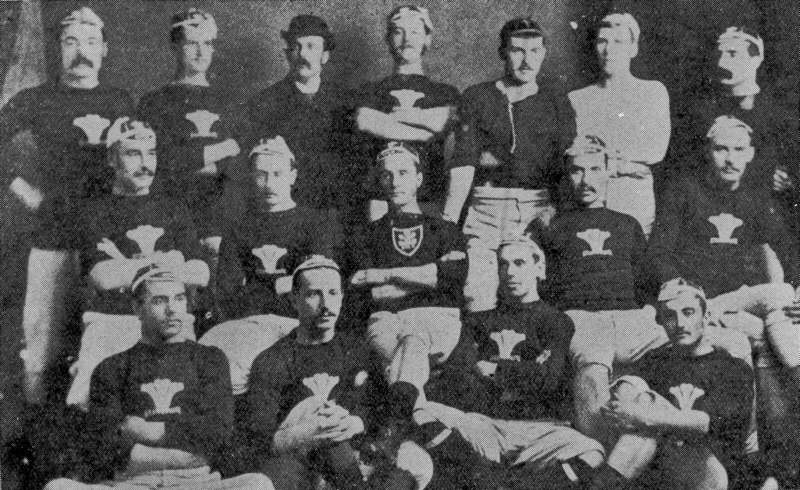
Wales Rugby Team, 1881. Garnons Williams is standing at the far right of the back row.

After going up to Trinity College, Garnons Williams represented Cambridge at rugby, but did not win a Blue. He played three matches for Newport RFC in 1880, after he had joined the army: against Manchester Rangers (2 October), Gloucester (4 December), and Cardiff (18 December). In 1881 he was selected to represent Wales in its first ever match, against England on 19 February at Blackheath. The challenge to England came from Richard Mullock of Newport, who was not an official of the South Wales Football Union, but wanted to bring Wales up to the same level as the other home nations, rather than settle for playing against English and Irish provincial teams. England, for its part, had recently beaten Ireland by two tries and two goals to none, and the previous season had become the first winners of the Calcutta Cup by beating Scotland by three tries and two goals to one goal. The date offered to Mullock by the English Rugby Football Union (RFU), 19 February, coincided with a match for the South Wales Cup between Llanelli and cup holders Swansea, thereby limiting Mullock's selection options. England won by eight goals to nil. It was Garnons Williams' only appearance for Wales.

International appearance

Opposition	Score	Result	Date	Venue	Ref
England	8-0	Lost	19 February 1881	Blackheath	

== Military career ==
Deciding to follow a military career Garnons Williams was accepted into the Royal Military College Sandhurst, and is also recorded as representing the Sandhurst rugby team. He completed his officer training in 1876, and was commissioned as a sub-lieutenant (Note: Following the Cardwell Reforms the British Army briefly used the rank of sub-lieutenant before settling on second lieutenant.) on 26 February. He was posted to the 38th Regiment of Foot, promoted lieutenant on 17 January 1877, and with his army rank (but not regimental seniority) backdated to his original commission as sub-lieutenant, and a month later, on 17 February 1877, transferred to the 7th Regiment of Foot.

By February 1885 he had been promoted to captain, and his unit had been renamed the Royal Fusiliers (City of London Regiment). On 10 January 1887 he was appointed adjutant of the 4th Battalion of the regiment, the Militia unit of the regiment. A regular officer was normally given this post in Militia units to organise training and generally maintain standards. His posting lasted the usual 5 years. He then retired from the regular army on 4 May 1892. On 8 August 1894 he was commissioned major in the 1st (Brecknockshire) Volunteer Battalion, South Wales Borderers, and on 1 November 1895 was appointed brigade major for the South Wales Brigade of the Volunteer Force. On 12 July 1899 he was granted the honorary rank of lieutenant colonel. He resigned his Volunteer commission on 26 May 1906, retaining his rank and with permission to continue wearing his uniform.

=== First World War ===
He rejoined the British Army shortly after the outbreak of World War I and was posted to his original regiment, joining the 12th (Service) Battalion of the Royal Fusiliers as a major on 26 September 1914. He was promoted temporary lieutenant colonel on 3 October 1914, and transferred back to the South Wales Borderers to command the Brecknockshire Battalion. He was later posted back to 12th Royal Fusiliers, and, according to official sources, was killed on 25 September 1915 while leading his battalion at the Battle of Loos. He is commemorated on the Loos Memorial to the Missing. At 59 years of age, he was the eldest of the 13 Wales international players to be killed during the war.

A soldier under the command of Colonel Garnons Williams wrote an account of his commanding officer's death, which puts the date of his death as 27 September. Col Garnons Williams was in temporary command of the 12th Royal Fusiliers when on 25 September he led his battalion in an attack on German trenches. However, the flanks were exposed and on 27 September, Garnons Williams gave the order to retreat. He was at that moment shot in the head from a house nearby. The soldier who gave the account said: "I was very sorry for him, as we could not have had a better, braver officer. He was with us all the time in the front trench, and looked after us as well as he could; no man could have done better. Nobody could get back to him." The following evening, the battalion was relieved, Garnons Williams being declared officially wounded and missing in action, unofficially reported killed.

== See also ==
- List of international rugby union players killed in action during the First World War
