= D. J. Cathcart King =

British historian and school teacher (1913–1989

David James Cathcart King FSA
- Born: 1913; Coombe Dingle, Bristol, England
- Died: 29 September 1989 (aged 75–76); Bristol, England

Academic background
- Education: University of Bristol

Academic work
- Discipline: Archaeology; History
- Sub-discipline: Castellology; Medieval archaeology
- Institutions: Cambrian Archaeological Association
- Notable works: Castellarium Anglicanum
- Military career
- Allegiance: United Kingdom
- Branch: British Army; Royal Artillery
- Conflicts: Second World War

David James Cathcart King FSA (1913 – 29 September 1989) was a British historian, archaeologist, and school-teacher. While working as a teacher he pursued his research in his free time, becoming "one of the leading authorities on the medieval castle". King was also president of the Cambrian Archaeological Association in 1976–77. A festschrift dedicated to King was published in 1987, titled Castles in Wales and the Marches.

== Education ==
King went to school at Clifton College in Bristol and studied law at the University of Bristol. He was the first student to complete a Master of Laws at the University of Bristol.

== Career ==
During the Second World War, King served in the Royal Artillery in the Middle East. His time there encouraged his interest in military architecture, and he went on to write papers about Krak des Chevaliers and the Citadel of Damascus in Syria.

After the war, King worked at Walton Lodge Preparatory School in Bristol as a history teacher. He was elected as a Fellow of the Society of Antiquaries in 1962.

He was a founding member of the Castle Studies Group, which was established in 1987.

== Selected publications ==
- King, D. J. C.; Alcock, Leslie (1969). "Ringworks of England and Wales". Château Gaillard: Études de castellologie médiévale. 3: 90–127.
- King, D. J. C. (1983). Castellarium Anglicanum: an index and bibliography of the castles in England, Wales, and the islands (two volumes). Kraus International Publications. ISBN 0-527-50110-7.
- King, D. J. C. (1988). The Castle in England and Wales: an Interpretative History. Croom Helm. ISBN 0-7099-4829-8.
