= William Luke Nichols =

English antiquarian

- Born: 10 August 1802; Gosport, Hampshire
- Died: 25 September 1889 (aged 87)
- Occupation: Antiquarian

William Luke Nichols (10 August 1802 – 25 September 1889) was an English antiquarian.

== Biography ==
Nichols was born at Gosport, Hampshire, 10 August 1802, was the eldest son of Luke Nichols, of that place, merchant. He matriculated at Queen's College, Oxford, on 28 February 1821, and graduated B.A. 1825, M.A. 1829. In 1827, he was ordained in the English church, being licensed to the curacy of Keynsham, Somerset. While cholera was raging in England, he had the undivided care, as curate in sole charge, of the enormous parish of Bedminster, near Bristol. From 1 February 1834 to 31 March 1839, he was minister of the church of St. James, Bath. For twelve months he was stationed at Trinity Church, Bath. He was then in charge of a district church near Ottery St. Mary, Devon. From 1846 to 1851 he held on his own nomination the rectory of Buckland Monachorum, near Plymouth. Nichols then returned to Bath, where he dwelt in the east wing of Lansdown Crescent, collected a valuable library, and acquired a great knowledge of literature. In 1858, and for several years afterwards, he lived at the Wyke, on Grasmere. For two or three years before 1870 he resided at the old Manor House, Keynsham, but from that date until his death his home was at the Woodlands, on the borders of the Quantocks, in Somerset, and midway between Nether Stowey and Alfoxden. Nichols travelled frequently in foreign countries, and was well acquainted with the scenery and antiquities of Spain, Italy, Sicily, Greece, and Palestine. He died at the Woodlands on 25 September 1889, and was buried with his parents in the family vault in Gosport churchyard on 2 October. By his will he left the parish the funds for the completion of a campanile, or bell-tower, which he had begun to erect. It cost, with the bells, the sum of 2,500l.

Nichols had great knowledge of literature, and frequently contributed to periodicals. In 1838, in Bath, he published a pamphlet entitled ‘Horæ Romanæ, or a Visit to a Roman Villa,’ which was suggested by the discovery, during the formation of the Great Western Railway, of the site of a Roman villa at Newton St. Loe, near Bath. The account of the excavations was followed by a poem of 120 lines in blank verse (cf. Scarth, Aquæ Solis, pp. 114–15). Nichols edited in 1866 the ‘Remains of the Rev. Francis Kilvert’ [q .v.] He was elected F.S.A. on 2 February 1865. He printed at Bath for private circulation in 1873 a paper on ‘The Quantocks and their Associations,’ which he read before the Bath Literary Club on 11 December 1871. It was interesting to the lovers of Coleridge, Wordsworth, Sir Humphry Davy, Thelwall, and Charles Lloyd. A second edition, revised and enlarged, with map and eleven illustrations, came out in 1891. Among the illustrations were photographs of the author and of his house, The Woodlands.
