= William Long (antiquary) =

English antiquarian

- Born: 15 August 1817
- Died: 14 April 1886 (aged 68); Onslow Gardens, London
- Occupation: Antiquarian

William Long (1817 – 1886) was an English antiquarian.

== Biography ==
Long was born on 15 August 1817. He was the second son of Walter Long of Corhampton, Hampshire, by Lady Mary, eldest daughter of William Carnegie, 7th Earl of Northesk. He started studies at Balliol College, Oxford on 5 June 1835, and graduated as a Bachelor of Arts in 1839, and as a Master of Arts in 1844. He was a justice of the peace for Somerset, and a Fellow of the Society of Antiquaries. He lived most of his life as a country gentleman. He was also a local antiquary. He married, 13 April 1841, Elizabeth Hare, only child of James Hare Joliffe. They had children together. He wrote works including Abury Illustrated, Devizes, 1858; Stonehenge and its Burrows, Devizes, 1876, 8vo, a valuable monograph. Both had appeared in a shorter form in Wiltshire Archaeological and Natural History Magazine.

He died on 14 April 1886, at Onslow Gardens, London.
