= Francis Kilvert =

British writer

The Reverend Robert Francis Kilvert
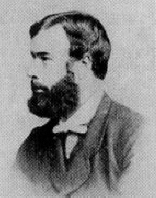
- Church: Church of England

Personal details
- Born: 3 December 1840 Chippenham, Wiltshire
- Died: 23 September 1879 (aged 38) Bredwardine, Herefordshire

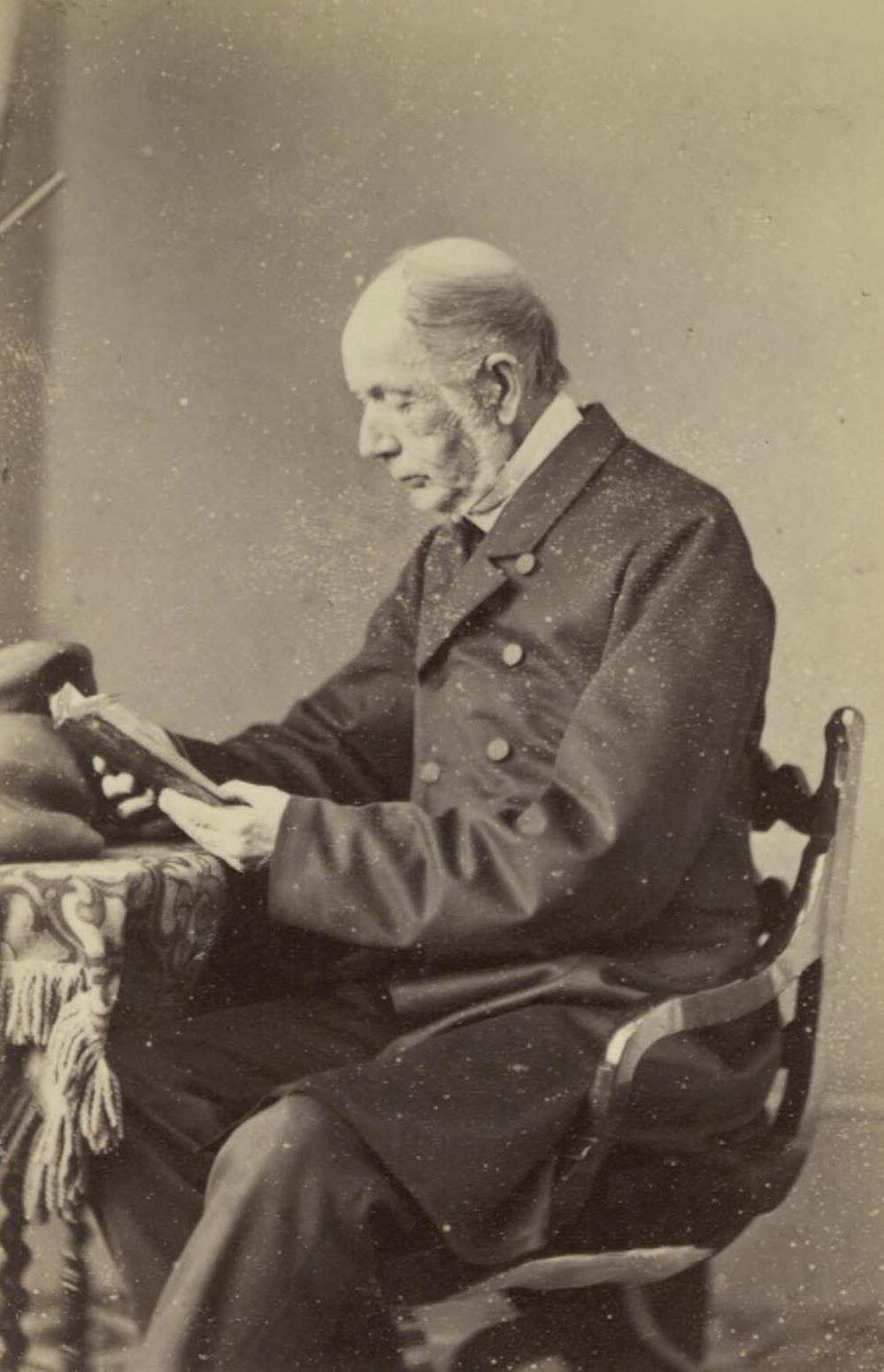
Photograph of Robert Kilvert (diarist's father) taken about 1870

Robert Francis Kilvert (3 December 1840 – 23 September 1879), known as Francis or Frank, was an English clergyman whose diaries reflected rural life in the 1870s, and were published over fifty years after his death.

== Life ==
Kilvert was born on 3 December 1840 at The Rectory, Hardenhuish Lane, near Chippenham, Wiltshire, to the Rev. Robert Kilvert, rector of Langley Burrell, Wiltshire, and Thermuthis, daughter of Walter Coleman and Thermuthis Ashe.

He was educated privately in Bath by his uncle, Francis Kilvert. He matriculated at Wadham College, Oxford, in 1859, graduating B.A. in 1862, M.A. in 1866. He entered the Church of England and became a rural curate, working primarily in the Welsh Marches between Hereford and Hay on Wye.

Initially, from 1863 to 1864, he was curate to his father at Langley Burrell, and in 1865 he became curate of Clyro, Radnorshire. There on 1 January 1870 he started a diary from which it appears that he basked in his life within the Welsh countryside, often writing several pages describing his surroundings and the parishioners that he visited.

In late 1871 he fell in love with Frances Eleanor Jane Thomas, the youngest daughter of William Thomas the vicar of Llanigon, a parish not far from Clyro, and asked her father for permission to marry her. Because of Kilvert's position as a lowly curate, Frances' father looked unfavourably on the request and refused it. After receiving this rejection Kilvert wrote in his diary that "The sun seemed to have gone out of the sky". Frances, who was referred to as Daisy in the diaries, would die a spinster in December 1928. Shortly after the rejection, in 1872, Kilvert resigned his position as curate of Clyro, and left the village, returning to his father's parish of Langley Burrell. From 1876 to 1877 he was vicar of St Harmon, Radnorshire, and from 1877 to his death in 1879 he was vicar of Bredwardine, Herefordshire.

In August 1879 he married Elizabeth Ann Rowland (1846–1911), whom he had met on a visit to Paris, his best man was William Edward Thomas Morgan. Kilvert died from peritonitis on 23 September, aged 38, a few days after returning from his honeymoon in Scotland. His grave lies in St Andrew Churchyard in Bredwardine.

== Diaries ==
Kilvert is best known as the author of voluminous diaries describing rural life. After his death, his diaries were edited and censored, possibly by his widow. Later they were passed on to William Plomer who transcribed the remaining diaries and edited and published a three-volume selection Selections from the Diary of the Rev. Francis Kilvert (Jonathan Cape, Vol I: 1870–1871 pub. 1938, Vol II: 1871–1874 pub.1939, Vol III: 1874–1879 pub.1940), and later a one-volume selection Kilvert's Diary, 1870–1879 (Jonathan Cape, 1944—corrected in 1960, and with an abridged and illustrated version for children published as Ardizzone's Kilvert in 1976). Published just before and during World War II, the first editions of the diaries were well received by the public when, in a period of bombing and rationing they provided an escapism back to the simpler and happier times of the mid Victorian era, still just within living memory.

A different selection from Plomer's abridgement was published as Journal of a Country Curate: Selections from the Diary of Francis Kilvert by The Folio Society in 1960. In 1992 a new selection was published under the editorship of David Lockwood, Kilvert, the Victorian: A New Selection from Kilvert's Diaries (Seren Books, 1992). Out of print since 1970, the three-volume indexed edition was reprinted in 2006 by O'Donoghue Books. In the 1950s, whilst Plomer was contemplating further publication of the remaining journals, it was found that the majority of the surviving diaries had been destroyed by their then owner, an elderly niece of Kilvert's, who claimed to have done so to protect "private family matters". This had occurred during a clear out of various personal papers, prior to moving into a residential care home. When confronted by this information Plomer was said to have recalled he "could have strangled her with his bare hands." Only the three volumes listed below survived, which the said niece gave to other people. Plomer's own transcription was destroyed by fire in the Blitz.

Despite Kilvert's niece's actions, she was a Vice-President and an avid member of the Kilvert Society for many years up until her death in 1964.

Francis Kilvert also published pleasant but conventional poetry, republished by the Kilvert Society in Collected verse : 3rd December 1840 - 23rd September 1879 by the Reverend Francis Kilvert in 1968.

The Cornish Diary: Journal No.4, 1870—From 19 July to 6 August, Cornwall was published by Alison Hodge in 1989. (Note: From 20 July to 6 August 1870, Kilvert stayed with the family of William Hockin at Tullimaar, Perranarworthal.) The National Library of Wales, which holds two of the three surviving volumes, published The Diary of Francis Kilvert: April–June 1870 in 1982 and The Diary of Francis Kilvert: June–July 1870 in 1989.

A new edition of the abridged 1944 Diary was published in 2019 by Vintage Classics to celebrate the 150th anniversary of Kilvert starting his diary, which fell in January 2020. It includes a recently discovered photograph of Kilvert and a new introduction by Mark Bostridge.

== Nudism ==
Kilvert was an enthusiast for public bathing in the nude, which he regarded as natural and healthy. The first entry in Kilvert's diaries in which he records his naked bathing was for 4 September 1872, at Weston-super-Mare. He writes: "Bathing in the morning before breakfast from a machine. Many people were openly stripping on the sands a little further on and running down into the sea and I would have done the same but I had brought down no towels of my own". However, next day Kilvert joins in the fun: "I was out early before breakfast this morning bathing from the sands. There was a delicious feeling of freedom in stripping in the open air and running down naked to the sea where the waves were curling white with foam and the red morning sunshine glowing upon the naked limbs of the bathers".

== Relationships with girls ==
Several modern writers have commented on passages in the diaries describing interactions with young girls which these days might raise suspicions of paedophilia. However, poet John Betjeman was among those who have since defended Kilvert, saying, "If there had been anything sinister in his attentions to them, he would hardly have written so candidly in his diary about his feelings".

== Modern adaptations ==
A John Betjeman documentary on Kilvert, Vicar of this Parish, was shown on BBC television in 1976. This led to Kilvert's Diary being dramatised (eighteen 15-minute episodes) on British television between 1977 and 1978, with Timothy Davies in the title role.

The diaries were dramatised on BBC Radio 4 (five episodes) in December 2019.
