= Hay Tump Castle =

Castle in Wales

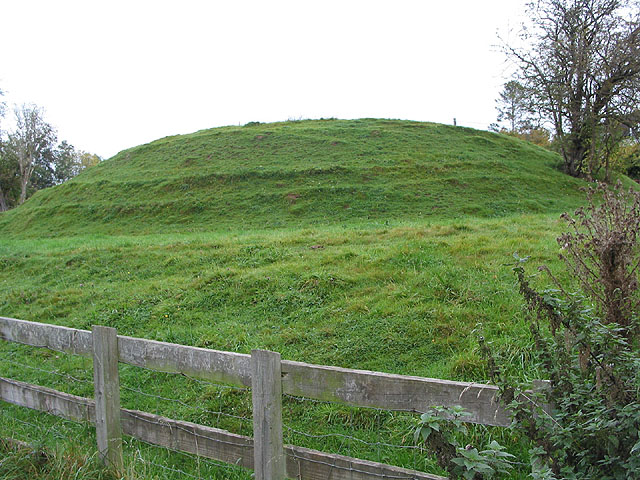
Image of Hay Tump Castle

Hay Tump Castle was a motte and Bailey castle situated in Hay-on-Wye in Powys, Wales, near to St Mary’s parish church in the town. It is situated 200 metres away from Hay Castle, which was the successor of Hay Tump castle.

== The Castle ==
=== History ===
Hay Tump Castle was built between the years 1095-1100 following the Battle of Brecon and the subjugation of the Welsh kingdoms. All that remains today is a small motte, with no evidence of a fortified Bailey, however the site where the Bailey presumably was is now occupied by a cattle market. The castle was presumably built by Sir Philip Walwyn although other sites claims it was another one of Bernard de Neufmarché’s knights called William Revel. One source claims that the castle was constructed by Philip Walwyn but he left or sold the castle to another knight of De Neufmarché who was William Revel.

=== Dimensions ===
The motte is 21 metres in diameter and 4.5 metres high, with steep sides and traces of a ditch on the western side.
