= Llowes =

Coordinates: 52.0668°N 3.1797°W

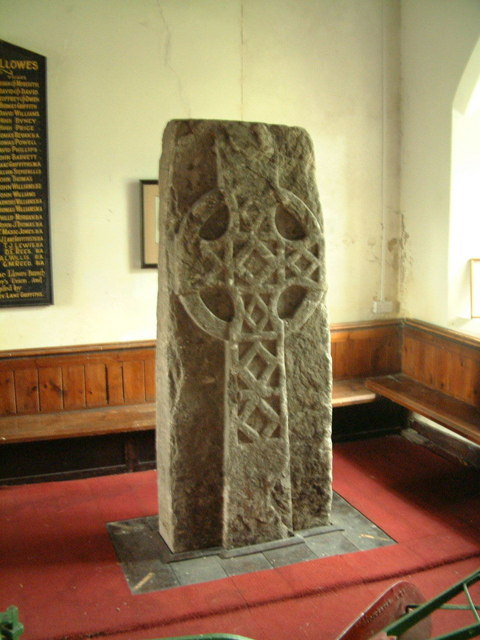
- St. Meilig's Cross

- Location within Powys
- Population: 110
- Principal area: Powys
- Preserved county: Powys
- Country: Wales
- Sovereign state: United Kingdom
- Post town: HEREFORD
- Postcode district: HR3
- Dialling code: 01497
- Police: Dyfed-Powys
- Fire: Mid and West Wales
- Ambulance: Welsh
- UK Parliament: Brecon, Radnor and Cwm Tawe
- Senedd Cymru – Welsh Parliament: Brecon & Radnorshire

Llowes is a small village in the community of Glasbury, Powys, Wales. The village has approximately 110 inhabitants (2005). The nearest town is Hay-on-Wye, some 3 miles (5 km) to the south-east.

== History ==
=== St. Meilig and St. Meilig's Cross ===
The parish church is dedicated to St. Meilig, who is said to have founded a monastery in the 6th century at Croesfeilig near the village and to be buried there. Meilig may have been one of the sons of Caw and brother to St. Gildas. He is mentioned in Culhwch and Olwen as one of the knights in the court of King Arthur. The church was completely rebuilt in 1853, though the base of the tower may be medieval and the iron-banded font is thought to be 12th century. St. Meilig's Cross, which originally stood at its eponymous site (Croesfeilig), was moved in the 12th century to the churchyard, and in 1956 (to prevent further erosion) into the church itself. The cross, carved into a standing stone, is believed to date either to the 6th or 7th century or to the 11th century. Local legend referred to the cross as "Moll Walbee's Stone", claiming it was thrown there by "Moll Walbee" or Maud de St. Valery, the immensely strong and indomitable wife of William de Braose, lord of Hay-on-Wye castle. Whilst carrying stones in her apron from the quarry at Glasbury to rebuild the castle, one fell into her shoe. She pulled it out and angrily threw it over the River Wye to land in Llowes churchyard.

=== Notable people ===
- Francis Kilvert (1840–1879), curate of the nearby village of Clyro from 1865 to 1872. Llowes is mentioned several times in his published diaries and a sundial, inscribed in his memory, can be found in the parish churchyard.
- Colonel Richard Garnons Williams (1856–1915), a British Army officer and Welsh rugby union player who represented Wales, Brecon and Newport.
