= Clyro =

Village and community in Powys, Wales

Clyro: Welsh: Cleirwy
- Location within Powys
- Population: 781
- OS grid reference: SO213438
- Principal area: Powys
- Preserved county: Powys
- Country: Wales
- Sovereign state: United Kingdom
- Post town: HEREFORD
- Postcode district: HR3
- Dialling code: 014978
- Police: Dyfed-Powys
- Fire: Mid and West Wales
- Ambulance: Welsh
- UK Parliament: Brecon, Radnor and Cwm Tawe
- Senedd Cymru – Welsh Parliament: Brecon & Radnorshire
- List of places UK Wales Powys 52.0867°N 3.1498°W Community map: Map of the community

Clyro (Welsh: Cleirwy) is a village and community in Radnorshire, Powys, Wales, with 781 inhabitants as of the 2011 UK Census. The nearest town is Hay-on-Wye, some 1.5 miles (2.4 km) to the south-east.

== History ==
The name of the village is thought to derive from the Welsh for 'clear water'. Though a Roman fort has been excavated within the village, the settlement of Clyro is presumed to be early medieval.

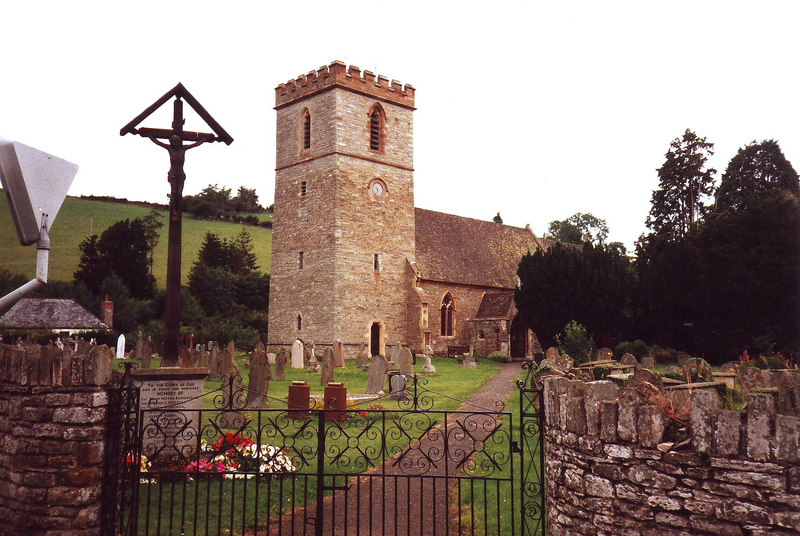
St Michael and All Angels, Clyro

The parish church is dedicated to Saint Michael and All Angels and was first recorded in the Valor Ecclesiasticus of 1535. It was, however, almost entirely rebuilt in the 19th century, though the base of the tower is early 15th century.

Clyro Castle was first mentioned in 1397, but may be much earlier. All that now remains is a large motte. A second motte, called Castle Kinsey and possibly built by Cadwallon ap Madog in the 12th century, is at Court Evan Gwynne just north of the village. The site is now a Radnorshire Wildlife Trust reserve called Cwm Byddog, also notable for its veteran oak pollards.

John Wesley, the founder of Methodism, and his supporter John William Fletcher often stayed and preached in Clyro at the house called Pentwyn.

Clyro Court was built by Thomas Mynors Baskerville in 1839. It is said that Sir Arthur Conan Doyle was a family friend and visitor, and may have been an inspiration for Baskerville Hall in The Hound of the Baskervilles. Clyro Court Farm is much older, being a former monastic grange with some of the buildings dating back to the 14th century.

The village has been cited as one of many explanations for the naming of the rock band Biffy Clyro.

== Francis Kilvert ==
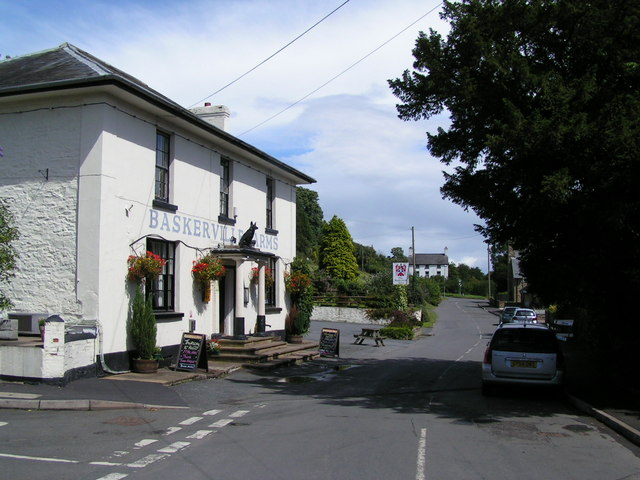
Baskerville Arms

Francis Kilvert was curate of the parish church from 1865 to 1872 and much of his published diaries deal with the people and landscape of Clyro and the surrounding area. This part of Wales, including the villages of Clyro, Capel-y-ffin, Llowes, Glasbury, Llanigon, Painscastle, and the town of Hay-on-Wye, as well as Clifford and Whitney-on-Wye in neighbouring Herefordshire, is sometimes referred to as "Kilvert Country". Kilvert's diaries were dramatised on BBC Radio 4 in December 2019.

There is a commemorative plaque in Clyro parish church and his former residence, Ashbrook House, is now an art gallery. Many of the buildings mentioned in the diaries are still extant, including the old village school where Kilvert taught, the old vicarage, the New Inn (now a private residence), and The Swan (now the Baskerville Arms).

== Notes ==
- Kilvert, Robert Francis (1983). The Curate of Clyro: Extracts from the Diary of the Reverend Francis Kilvert. Gwasg Gregynog.
