= Eigion =

Welsh saint

Saint Eigion was a 6th-century Welsh saint. He is the brother of Saint Cynidr. The church at Llanigon may have originally been dedicated to him.
