= Hay Castle =

Ruined castle in Hay-on-Wye, Powys, Wales

- Castell y Gelli
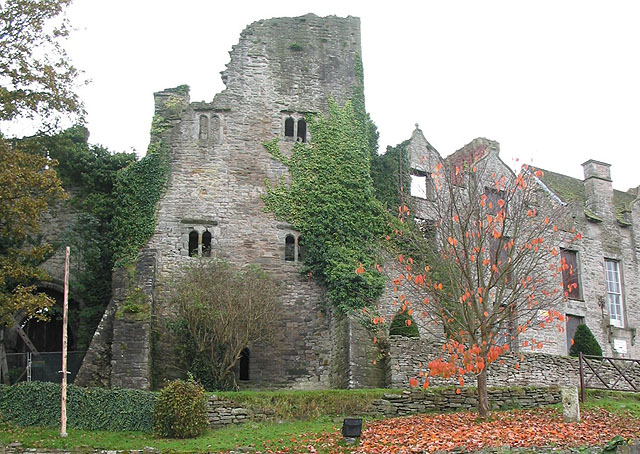
- Hay Castle from the north, before the 2022 restoration, showing the gateway and keep (left) and the mansion house (right)

- Location within Powys

General information
- Location: Hay-on-Wye, Powys, Wales
- Coordinates: 52.07390°N 3.12611°W
- Construction started: Late 11th or early 12th century

Website
- https://www.haycastletrust.org

Hay Castle (Welsh: Castell y Gelli) is a medieval fortification and 17th-century mansion house in the small town of Hay-on-Wye in Powys, Wales. Originally constructed as part of the Norman invasion of Wales, the castle was designed as a ringwork overlooking the town in either the late 11th or the early 12th centuries. It was rebuilt in stone around 1200 by the de Braose family and then had a turbulent history, being attacked and burnt several times during the First and Second Barons' Wars, the wars with the Welsh princes, the rebellion of Owain Glyndŵr and the Wars of the Roses. In the 17th century a Jacobean mansion house was built alongside the medieval keep and the property became a private home. Serious fires in 1939 and 1977 gutted the castle and, despite repairs in the 1980s, by the early 21st century much of the building was derelict and unstable. Since 2011 it has been owned by Hay Castle Trust who have restored the property to form a centre for arts, literature and learning. Following the restoration, partly funded by grants from the National Lottery Heritage Fund of over £5m, the castle opened to the public on 26 May 2022.

== History ==
=== 11th–16th centuries ===
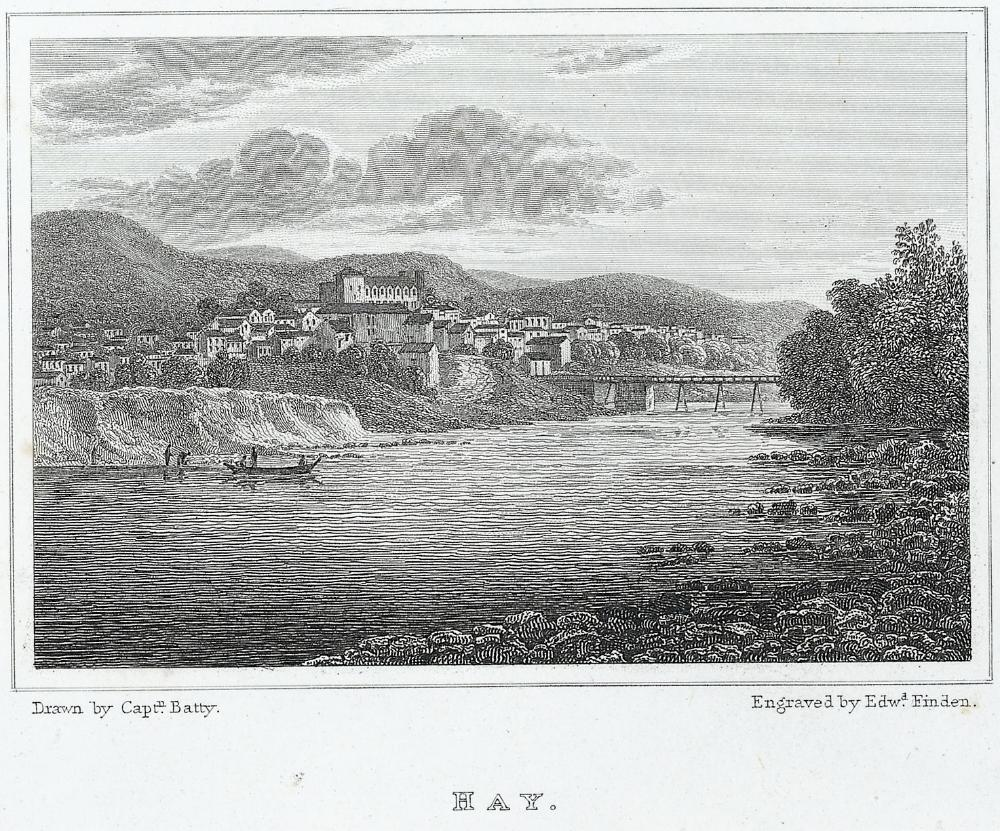
Depiction of Hay in 1823, showing the castle overlooking the town

The Normans began to make incursions into South Wales from the late 1060s onwards, pushing westwards from their bases in recently occupied England. Their advance was marked by the construction of castles and the creation of regional lordships. The Norman conqueror Bernard de Neufmarché conquered Brecknock in 1091 and assigned the manor of Hay to one of his followers, Philip Walwyn. The first castle in Hay, later abandoned, was built by St Mary's church outside the main settlement, where a motte known as Hay Tump still survives. The English lordship of Hay, known as Hay Anglicana, became a wealthy walled town and the lands passed by marriage to Miles of Gloucester and then into the de Braose family. In the late 11th or early 12th century, a new fortification was built inside Hay itself, on high ground around 200 metres (660 ft) from the old motte, taking the form of an earth ringwork with a stone gate tower.

The de Braose dynasty expanded Hay Castle in stone around 1200 with a curtain wall reinforced by intramural timbers, turning the gate tower into a keep. The castle tenants used the chapel of St John in the town for their worship. During the First Barons' War, Reginald de Braose joined the alliance against King John who successfully attacked the castle in 1215. The Welsh prince Llywelyn ab Iorwerth attacked and burnt the town and castle in 1231 and the castle was then rebuilt by Henry III in 1233. During the Second Barons' War, Prince Edward captured the castle in 1263 but it was recaptured and burnt by Simon de Montfort and Llywelyn ap Gruffudd the following year. It was further damaged by the Welsh rebellion led by Owain Glyndŵr around 1401 and in 1460 during the Wars of the Roses. By the time the antiquarian John Leland visited in the 16th century, the town of Hay was "wonderfully decaied" although the castle was described as having once "bene right stately".

=== 17th–19th centuries ===
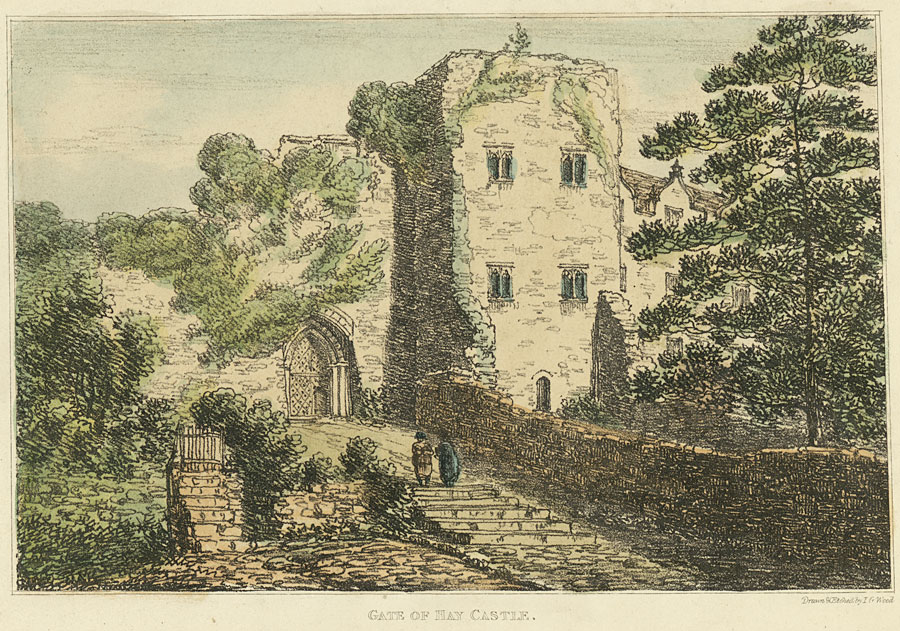
Depiction of the castle in 1816

Hay Castle was substantially expanded in the 17th century, creating a Jacobean mansion. Two explanations have been offered by historians for this redevelopment. One possibility is that during the first half of the 17th century Howell Gwynne built a manor house to the west of the old keep, which was replaced by a new mansion in 1660 by James Boyle of Hereford. Another reverses this sequence, suggesting that James Boyle left the castle to Howell Gwynne in 1603, and that the mansion was built at the beginning of the century. In either case, the Jacobean building was two storeys tall, three with its facade included, and featured seven dormer gables in a Dutch style and a large staircase. It was built from stone and incorporated the upper floors of the old keep into its design. Formal gardens were constructed outside the keep either around the start of the 17th century or after 1660. In 1702, the house was divided up among different tenants, and passed into the hands of the local Wellington family. Until 1812, the basement of the keep was used to supplement the town gaol.

In 1809, the industrialist Sir Joseph Bailey leased the castle, going on to purchase it outright in 1844, and established a walled kitchen garden known as Castle Gardens to the south-west of the main castle. It was used as a vicarage from 1825 onwards, including by Archdeacon William Bevan. The terraced gardens were maintained during the 19th century, with various trees planted behind the castle in the 1860s and 1870s, and a stable block was built within the grounds.

=== 20th–21st centuries ===
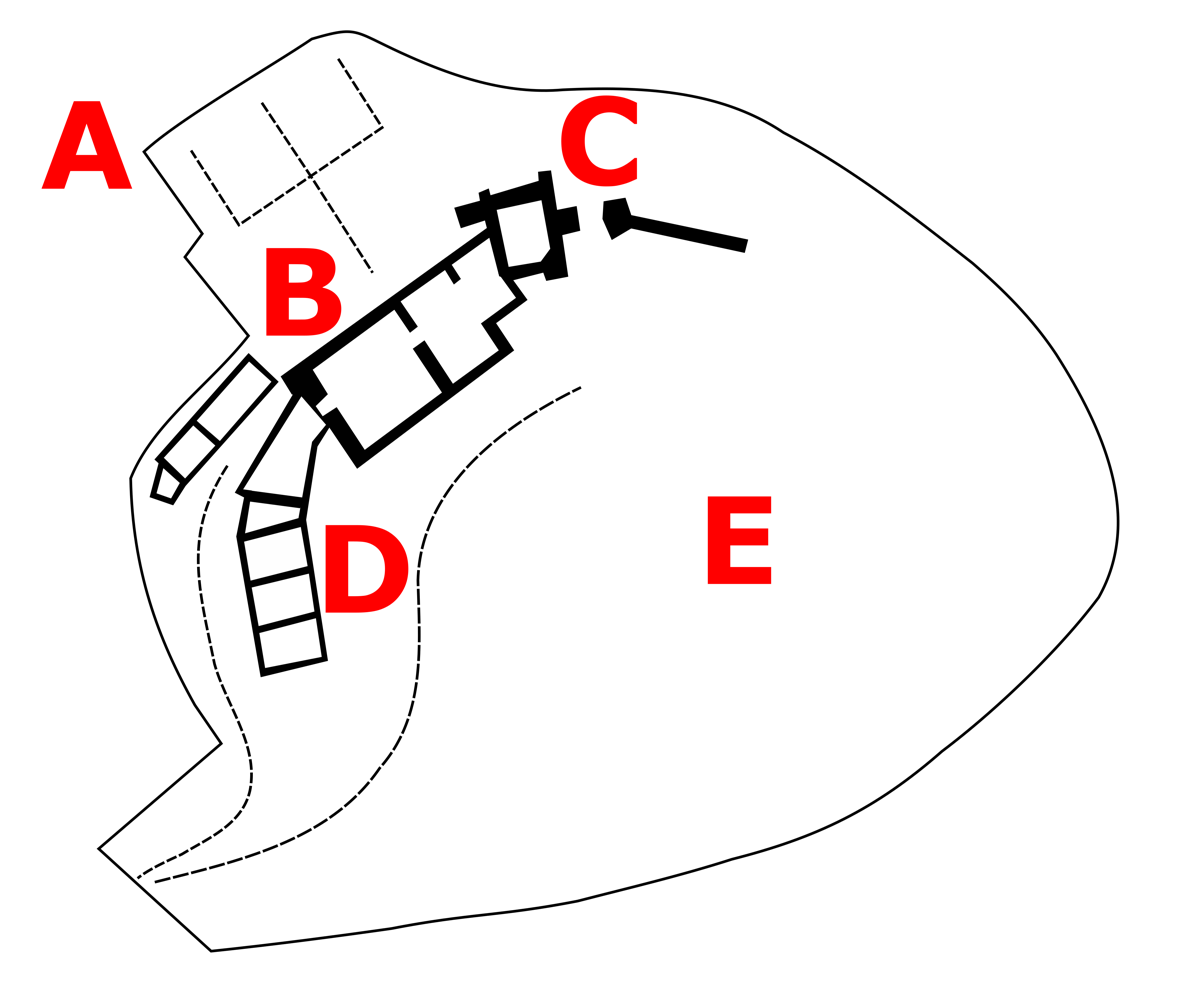
Plan of the castle in the 21st century; A – terraced gardens; B – mansion; C – keep and gateway; D – stable and service block; E – rear garden

Between 1904 and 1906 the castle was rented by the Morell family, after which it was occupied by the Dowager Lady Glanusk. The architect W. D. Caröe was employed to restore the house in 1910 and it was sold to the banker Benjamin Guinness in 1937. A major fire then destroyed the interior of the eastern side of the castle in 1939. Around 1961, the castle was acquired by Richard Booth who used it as a bookstore and as a location for parties, with a holiday cottage in the grounds. Much of the walled garden was sold for development in 1975, and another fire in 1977 destroyed the interior of the western half of the castle: repairs were carried out from the 1980s onwards.

In 2011 the castle was sold for around £2 million to Hay Castle Trust, which acquired it to restore the building for use as a centre for arts, literature and learning. The firm of Rick Mather Architects was appointed to design the restoration, to include an art gallery and a viewing point at the top of the keep. The restoration was funded by grants of over £5 million from the National Lottery Heritage Fund, together with additional funding from trusts, foundations, individuals and the Welsh Government. The castle opened to the public for the first time in its history on 26 May 2022.

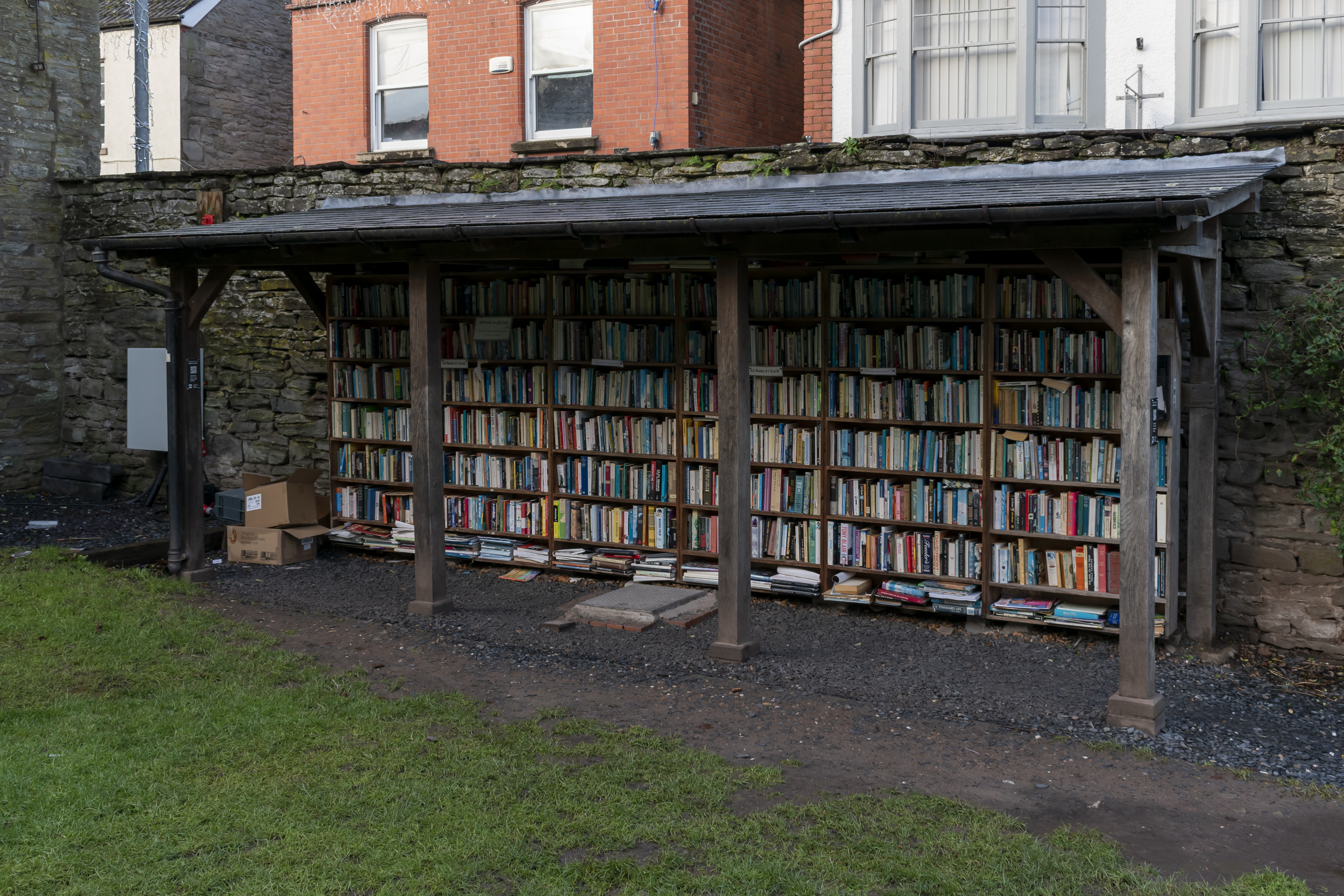
Honesty bookshop in the grounds of Hay Castle

The castle site is now approximately 110 by 100 metres (360 by 330 ft) across. The Jacobean mansion has been restored to create the centre for arts, literature and learning. The earlier buildings have been stabilised. None of the earthworks or curtain wall survive, except for a small portion next to the gateway; this fragment of wall is 6 feet (1.8 m) thick and shows the original bank to have been as much as 25 feet (7.6 m) high when viewed from the outside, but is in poor condition. The wooden door on the left side of the gateway probably dates from around 1300, and the right door from the early 17th century. There are some limited remains of the old walled garden interspersed in the modern housing estate. The main castle site is protected under law as a Grade I listed building. The castle gardens are listed Grade II on the Cadw/ICOMOS Register of Parks and Gardens of Special Historic Interest in Wales.

== See also ==
- List of castles in Wales
- Castles in Great Britain and Ireland

== Bibliography ==
- Briggs, C. S. (1991), "Garden Archaeology in Wales", in Brown, A. E. (ed.), Garden Archaeology: Papers Presented to a Conference at Knuston Hall, Northamptonshire, April 1988, London, UK: Council for British Archaeology, pp. 138–159, ISBN 1-872414-17-6
- Burton, Peter A. (2010–2011), "Original Castle Gates and Doors – A Survey" (PDF), The Castle Studies Group Journal (24): 246–259
- Carpenter, David (2004), The Struggle for Mastery: The Penguin History of Britain 1066–1284, London, UK: Penguin, ISBN 978-0-14-014824-4
- Evans, Christopher J. (1912), Breconshire, Cambridge, UK: Cambridge University Press
- Forde, Mari (2015), "Saving the Castle in the Town of Books", Rural Wales (Autumn 2015): 14–15
- Higham, Robert; Barker, Philip (2004), Timber Castles, Exeter, UK: University of Exeter Press, ISBN 978-0-85989-753-2
- King, D. J. Cathcart (1961), "The Castles of Breconshire", Brycheiniog, 7: 71–94
- Prior, Stuart (2006), A Few Well-Positioned Castles: The Norman Art of War, Stroud, UK: Tempus, ISBN 978-0-7524-3651-7
- Smith, Toulmin (1906), The Itinerary in Wales of John Leland in or about the years 1536–1539, London, UK: George Bell and Sons
