= Milborne-Swinnerton-Pilkington baronets =

Baronetcy in the Baronetage of Nova Scotia

Pilkington's Name Act 1836
- Act of Parliament
- Parliament of the United Kingdom
- Long title: An Act to authorize Dame Mary, the Wife of Sir William Pilkington, Baronet, to bear the Surnames of Milborne and Swinnerton jointly with the Surname of Pilkington, and to be called by the Surnames of Milborne Swinnerton Pilkington, and for authorizing the said Sir William Pilkington and Dame Mary, his Wife, to bear or quarter the Arms of Swinnerton, of Butterton, and Milborne, and also for authorizing the second Son of the said Sir William Pilkington and Dame Mary, his Wife, and his Issue, to assume and bear the Surnames of Milborne Swinnerton in lieu of the Surname of Pilkington, and to bear or quarter the said Arms of Swinnerton, of Butterton and Milborne, in compliance with a condition contained in the Will of Thomas Swinnerton, Esquire, deceased.
- Citation: 6 & 7 Will. 4. c. 52 Pr.

Dates
- Royal assent: 28 July 1836

The Pilkington, later Milborne-Swinnerton-Pilkington Baronetcy, of Stanley in the County of York, is a title in the Baronetage of Nova Scotia. It was created on 29 June 1635 for Arthur Pilkington, along with a grant of 6,000 acres (24 km^{2}) in Nova Scotia. The fifth Baronet was High Sheriff of Yorkshire for 1740–41 and sat as member of parliament for Horsham.

Swinnerton's Name Act 1854
- Act of Parliament
- Parliament of the United Kingdom
- Long title: An Act to authorize Sir William Milborne Milborne Swinnerton Baronet, and his Issue, to resume and bear the Surname of Pilkington jointly with the Surnames of Milborne and Swinnerton and to be called by the Surnames of Milborne Swinnerton Pilkington, and for such Purposes to repeal in part an Act of the Sixth and Seventh Years of the Reign of His late Majesty King William the Fourth.
- Citation: 17 & 18 Vict. c. 1 Pr.

Dates
- Royal assent: 16 June 1854

Text of statute as originally enacted

The eighth Baronet married Mary, daughter and co-heir of Thomas Swinnerton, of Butterton Hall, Staffordshire, by his wife Mary, daughter and heir of Charles Milborne, of Wonastow Court, Monmouthshire. His second son William changed his name to Milborne-Swinnerton by a private act of Parliament, Pilkington's Name Act 1836 (6 & 7 Will. 4. c. 52 Pr.), but later resumed the use of the surname of Pilkington in addition to Milborne-Swinnerton by Swinnerton's Name Act 1854 (17 & 18 Vict. c. 1 Pr.), which partially revoked the first act, .

Swinnerton's Name Act 1856
- Act of Parliament
- Parliament of the United Kingdom
- Long title: An Act to authorize Sir Lionel Milborne Swinnerton Baronet and his Issue to assume and bear the Surnam of Pilkington jointly with the Surnames of Milborne and Swinnerton, and to be called by the Surnames of Milborne Swinnerton Pilkington.
- Citation: 19 & 20 Vict. c. 5 Pr.

Dates
- Royal assent: 23 June 1856

Text of statute as originally enacted

Similarly, Sir William Pilkington's youngest son Lionel, the eleventh Baronet, assumed in 1856 by royal licence the surname of Milborne-Swinnerton, but later resumed the surname of Pilkington in addition to those of Milborne-Swinnerton by Swinnerton's Name Act 1856 (19 & 20 Vict. c. 5 Pr.). He was High Sheriff of Yorkshire for 1859–60.

== Pilkington, later Milborne-Swinnerton-Pilkington baronets, of Stanley (1635) ==
- Sir Arthur Pilkington, 1st Baronet (died 1650)
- Sir Lyon Pilkington, 2nd Baronet (1613–1684)
- Sir Lyon Pilkington, 3rd Baronet (c. 1660–1714)
- Sir Lyon Pilkington, 4th Baronet (1683–1716)
- Sir Lionel Pilkington, 5th Baronet (1707–1778)
- Sir Michael Pilkington, 6th Baronet (1715–1788)
- Sir Thomas Pilkington, 7th Baronet (1773–1811)
- Sir William Pilkington, 8th Baronet (1775–1850)
- Sir Thomas Edward Pilkington, 9th Baronet (1829–1854)
- Sir William Milborne-Swinnerton-Pilkington, 10th Baronet (1831–1855)
- Sir Lionel Milborne-Swinnerton-Pilkington, 11th Baronet (1835–1901)
- Sir Thomas Edward Milborne-Swinnerton-Pilkington, 12th Baronet (1857–1944)
- Sir Arthur William Milborne-Swinnerton-Pilkington, 13th Baronet (1898–1952)
- Sir Thomas Henry Milborne-Swinnerton-Pilkington, 14th Baronet (1934–2024)
- Sir Richard Milborne-Swinnerton-Pilkington, 15th Baronet (born 1964)
