= Fairfield High School, Peterchurch =

Fairfield High School
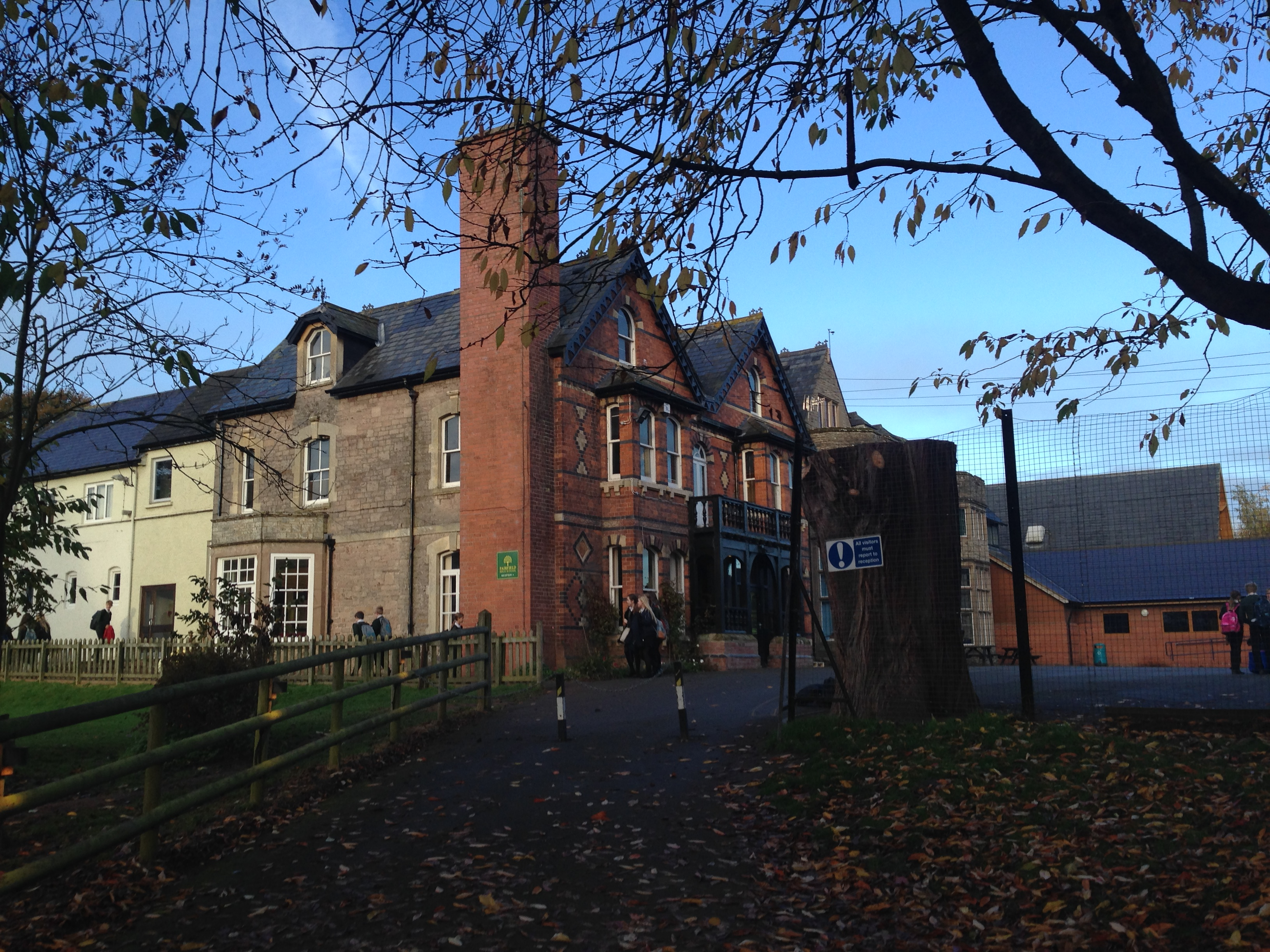

Location
- Peterchurch; Herefordshire, HR2 0SG; England; 52°02′15″N 2°57′24″W

Information
- Type: Academy
- Established: c. 1947
- Local authority: Herefordshire
- Department for Education URN: 140868 Tables
- Ofsted: Reports
- Headteacher: Paul Jennings
- Gender: Coeducational
- Age: 11 to 16
- Enrolment: 530
- Houses: Dore, Escley, Monnow, Olchon and Arrow
- Website: http://www.fairfield.hereford.sch.uk/

Fairfield High School is a coeducational secondary school located in Peterchurch, Herefordshire, England.

Fairfield High School is located in the Golden Valley. It is situated among the communities of Peterchurch, Dorstone, Abbey Dore and Ewyas Harold, around 5 miles from the Welsh border.

The local environment lends itself to its house names: Dore (River Dore), Escley (Escley Brook), Monnow (River Monnow), Olchon (Olchon Valley) and Arrow (River Arrow) .

Fairfield High School is one of the top state schools in the country. In the October 2013 Ofsted inspection, the school received the best possible score - "Outstanding" in every category. In 2024 the school retained its Ofsted "Outstanding" status. The school converted to academy status in May 2014.

== Curriculum ==
Fairfield offers traditional subjects are provided alongside vocational learning opportunities.

Students in Key Stage 3 study:

- English and Literacy
- Mathematics
- Science
- Humanities (History, Geography, Ethics)
- Modern Foreign Languages (French, Spanish)
- Food Technology
- Art and Textiles
- Design & Technology
- Computer Science / Computing
- Performing Arts (Music, Drama)
- Physical Education
- Religious Studies

Students in Key Stage 4 may add vocational subjects:

- Animal Care
- Construction and the Built Environment
- BTEC Physical Education
- Life Skills Studies

== Animals ==
A large number of exotic and farm animals are kept at the school, including alpacas, rodents, reptiles, rabbits, guinea pigs, ferrets, sheep and goats. These are looked after by the students themselves as part of their learning for Key Stage 4 Animal Care studies.

== Notable past pupils ==
- Josie Pearson - Paralympic champion
