= Bacton railway station =

Former railway station in Herefordshire, England

Bacton
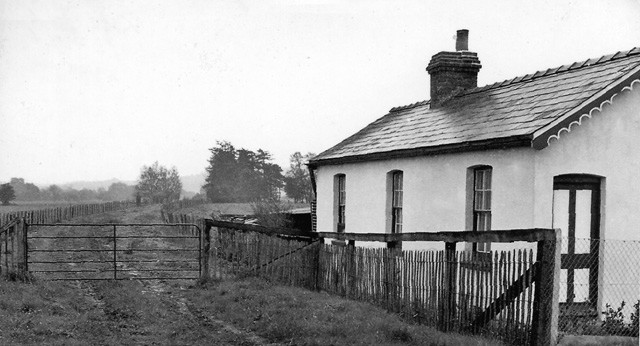
- Site of Bacton railway station in 1961

General information
- Location: Bacton, Herefordshire; England
- Coordinates: 51.9874°N 2.9018°W
- Grid reference: SO380325
- Platforms: 1

Other information
- Status: Disused

History
- Original company: Golden Valley Railway
- Pre-grouping: Great Western Railway
- Post-grouping: Great Western Railway

Key dates
- 1 September 1881: Station opens as Bacton Road
- 22 October 1883: Station closes
- 17 November 1883: Station reopens
- 2 July 1885: Station closes
- 19 August 1885: Station reopens
- 20 April 1898: Station closes
- 1 May 1901: Station reopens
- 1 July 1903: Station renamed Bacton
- 15 December 1941: Station closes
Location

Bacton railway station was a station in Bacton, Herefordshire, England. It was located on the Great Western Railway branch line linking Pontrilas and Hay-on-Wye. The area is known as the Golden Valley.

== History ==
Opened by the Golden Valley Railway in 1881, the station closed and re-opened three times in the next twenty years, and lost the Bacton Road suffix. It closed for the last time in 1941.

Preceding station	Historical railways	Following station
Vowchurch; Line and station closed	Great Western Railway; Golden Valley Railway	Abbeydore; Line and station closed
