= Michaelchurch Escley =

Village in Herefordshire, England

Coordinates: 52.001297°N 2.9967529°W

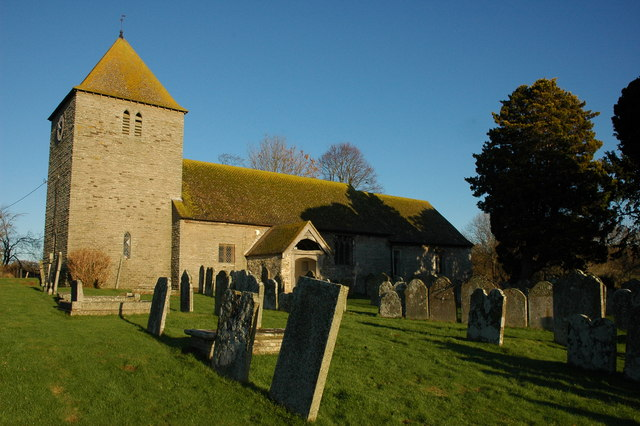

- Location within Herefordshire
- Area: 18.54 km^{2} (7.16 sq mi)
- Population: 198 (2011 census)
  - Density: 11/km^{2} (28/sq mi)
- Civil parish: Michaelchurch Escley
- Unitary authority: County of Herefordshire
- Shire county: Herefordshire
- Region: West Midlands
- Country: England
- Sovereign state: United Kingdom
- Police: West Mercia
- Fire: Hereford and Worcester
- Ambulance: West Midlands

Michaelchurch Escley is a village and civil parish 13 miles (21 km) west of Hereford, in the county of Herefordshire, England. In 2011 the parish had a population of 198. The parish touches Craswall, Cusop, Dorstone, Llanveynoe, Longtown, Newton, Peterchurch and St. Margarets. Michaelchurch Escley shares a parish council with Newton, St Margarets, Turnastone and Vowchurch called "Vowchurch and District Group Parish Council".

== Landmarks ==
There are 66 listed buildings in Michaelchurch Escley. Michaelchurch Escley has a church called St Michael, a primary school, a pub called The Bridge Inn and a village hall called Escleyside Hall.

== History ==
The name "Michaelchurch Escley" means 'St. Michael's church' on the Escley Brook.
