= Abbeydore railway station =

Former railway station in Herefordshire, England

Abbeydore
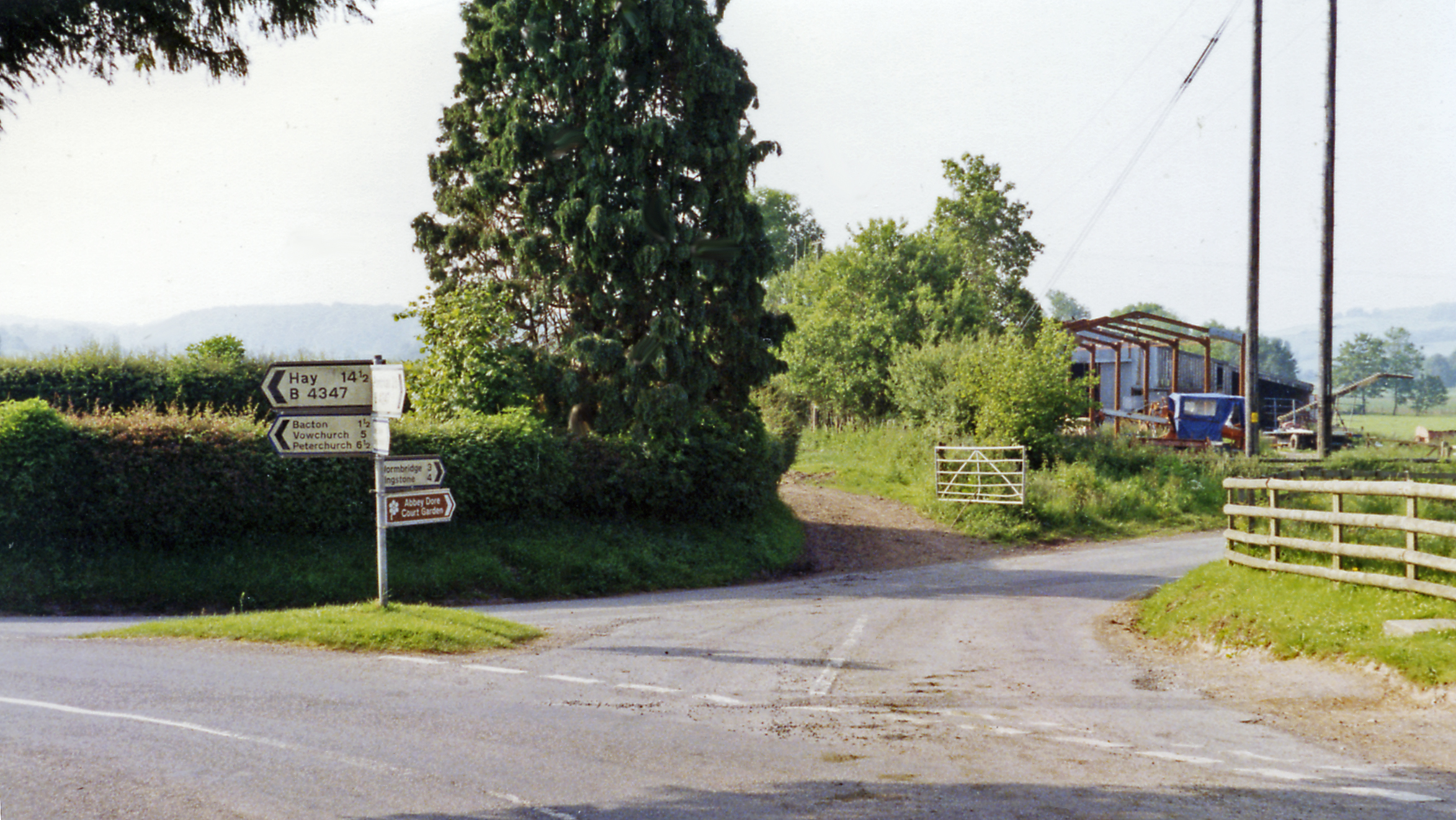
- Location of the former station (1994)

General information
- Location: Abbey Dore, Herefordshire; England
- Coordinates: 51.9721°N 2.8973°W
- Grid reference: SO385308
- Platforms: 1

Other information
- Status: Disused

History
- Opened: 1 September 1881
- Original company: Golden Valley Railway
- Pre-grouping: Great Western Railway
- Post-grouping: Great Western Railway

Key dates
- 22 October 1883: Station closes
- 17 November 1883: Station reopens
- 2 July 1885: Station closes
- 19 August 1885: Station reopens
- 20 April 1898: Station closes
- 1 May 1901: Station reopens
- 15 December 1941: Station closes
Location

Abbeydore railway station was a station in Abbey Dore, Herefordshire, England. It was located on the Great Western Railway branch line linking Pontrilas and Hay-on-Wye. The area is known as the Golden Valley.

== History ==
Opened by the Golden Valley Railway in 1881, the station closed and reopened three times in the next twenty years. It closed for the last time in 1941.

Just south before the station, via a level crossing, was the railway access point for the MoD's Elm Bridge Munitions Depot.

In 1901, traces of the Roman road which passed from Wroxeter to Abergavenny were found at the station.

Preceding station	Historical railways	Following station
Bacton; Line and station closed	Great Western Railway; Golden Valley Railway	Pontrilas; Line and station closed
