= Peterchurch railway station =

Former railway station in Herefordshire, England

Peterchurch

General information
- Location: Peterchurch, Herefordshire; England
- Coordinates: 52.0414°N 2.9578°W
- Grid reference: SO344385
- Platforms: 1

Other information
- Status: Disused

History
- Original company: Great Western Railway
- Pre-grouping: Great Western Railway
- Post-grouping: Great Western Railway

Key dates
- 1901: Opened
- 1941: Closed to passengers
- 1953: Closed
Location

Peterchurch railway station was a station in Peterchurch, Herefordshire, England. The station was opened in 1901, closed to passengers in 1941 and closed completely in 1953.

Preceding station	Historical railways	Following station
Dorstone; Line and station closed	Great Western Railway; Golden Valley Railway	Vowchurch; Line and station closed
