= St Margarets, Herefordshire =

Village in Herefordshire, England

Coordinates: 51.998826°N 2.9413949°W

St Margarets
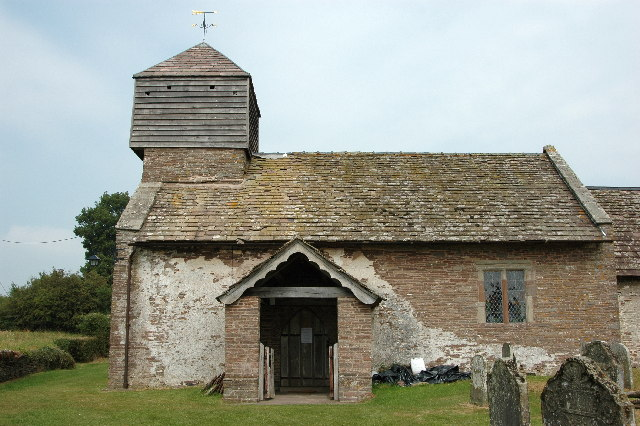

- Location within Herefordshire
- Area: 10.54 km^{2} (4.07 sq mi)
- Population: 180 (2011 census)
  - Density: 17/km^{2} (44/sq mi)
- Civil parish: St Margarets
- Unitary authority: County of Herefordshire
- Shire county: Herefordshire
- Region: West Midlands
- Country: England
- Sovereign state: United Kingdom
- Police: West Mercia
- Fire: Hereford and Worcester
- Ambulance: West Midlands

St Margarets is a village and civil parish 11 miles (18 km) west of Hereford, in the county of Herefordshire, England. The parish includes the hamlet of Upper Maes-coed. In 2011 the parish had a population of 180. The parish touches Abbey Dore, Bacton, Dulas, Longtown, Michaelchurch Escley, Newton, Peterchurch, Turnastone and Vowchurch. St Margarets shares a parish council with Michaelchurch Escley, Newton, Turnastone and Vowchurch called "Vowchurch and District Group Parish Council".

== Landmarks ==
There are 19 listed buildings in St Margarets. St Margarets has a church called St Margaret's that displays a plaque in the memento mori tradition in Welsh with the words Karka dy ddiwwedd ("remember your end"), dated 1574.

== History ==
The placename is recent even though the church dates to the 12th century.
