= Westbrook railway station (England) =

Former railway station in Herefordshire, England

Westbrook

General information
- Location: Northwest of Dorstone, Herefordshire; England
- Coordinates: 52.0864°N 3.0497°W
- Grid reference: SO281436
- Platforms: 1

Other information
- Status: Disused

History
- Original company: Golden Valley Railway
- Pre-grouping: Great Western Railway
- Post-grouping: Great Western Railway

Key dates
- 1881: Opened
- 1941: Closed to passengers
- 1950: Closed
Location

Westbrook railway station was a station to the northwest of Dorstone, Herefordshire, England. The station was opened in 1881, closed to passengers in 1941 and closed completely in 1950.

Preceding station	Historical railways	Following station
Greens Siding; Line and station closed	Great Western Railway; Golden Valley Railway	Dorstone; Line and station closed
