= Pontrilas railway station =

Disused railway station in Herefordshire, England

Pontrilas
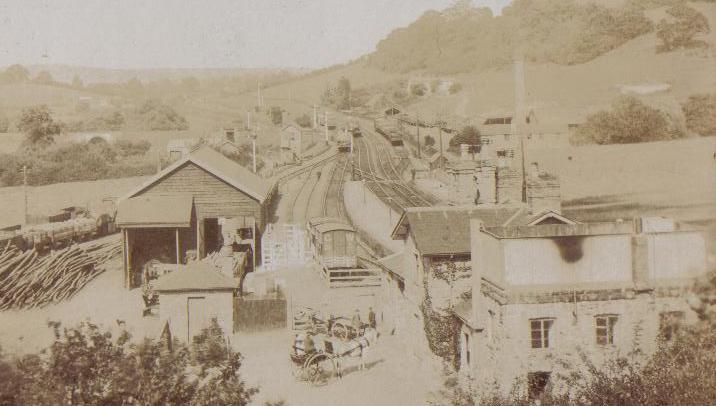
- A busy scene at Pontrilas Station in 1907

General information
- Location: Pontrilas, Herefordshire; England
- Coordinates: 51.9435°N 2.8765°W
- Grid reference: SO397276
- Platforms: 3

Other information
- Status: Disused

History
- Original company: Newport, Abergavenny and Hereford Railway
- Pre-grouping: Great Western Railway
- Post-grouping: Great Western Railway

Key dates
- 1854: Opened
- 9 June 1958: Closed
Location

Pontrilas railway station is a former station which served the Herefordshire villages of Pontrilas and Ewyas Harold, and was a little distance from Grosmont, in Monmouthshire, Wales. It was located on the Welsh Marches Line between Hereford and Abergavenny. The Golden Valley Railway ran from here through to the Midland Railway line at Hay on Wye. The station is now a private house with attached self-catering holiday cottage created from the former waiting room.

In the 1860s, the Monnow Valley Railway was planned to link the mines of the Forest of Dean northwards to the Midlands, through a new line between Monmouth and Pontrilas. Little work was completed before the Panic of 1866 brought an end to this era of railway expansion.

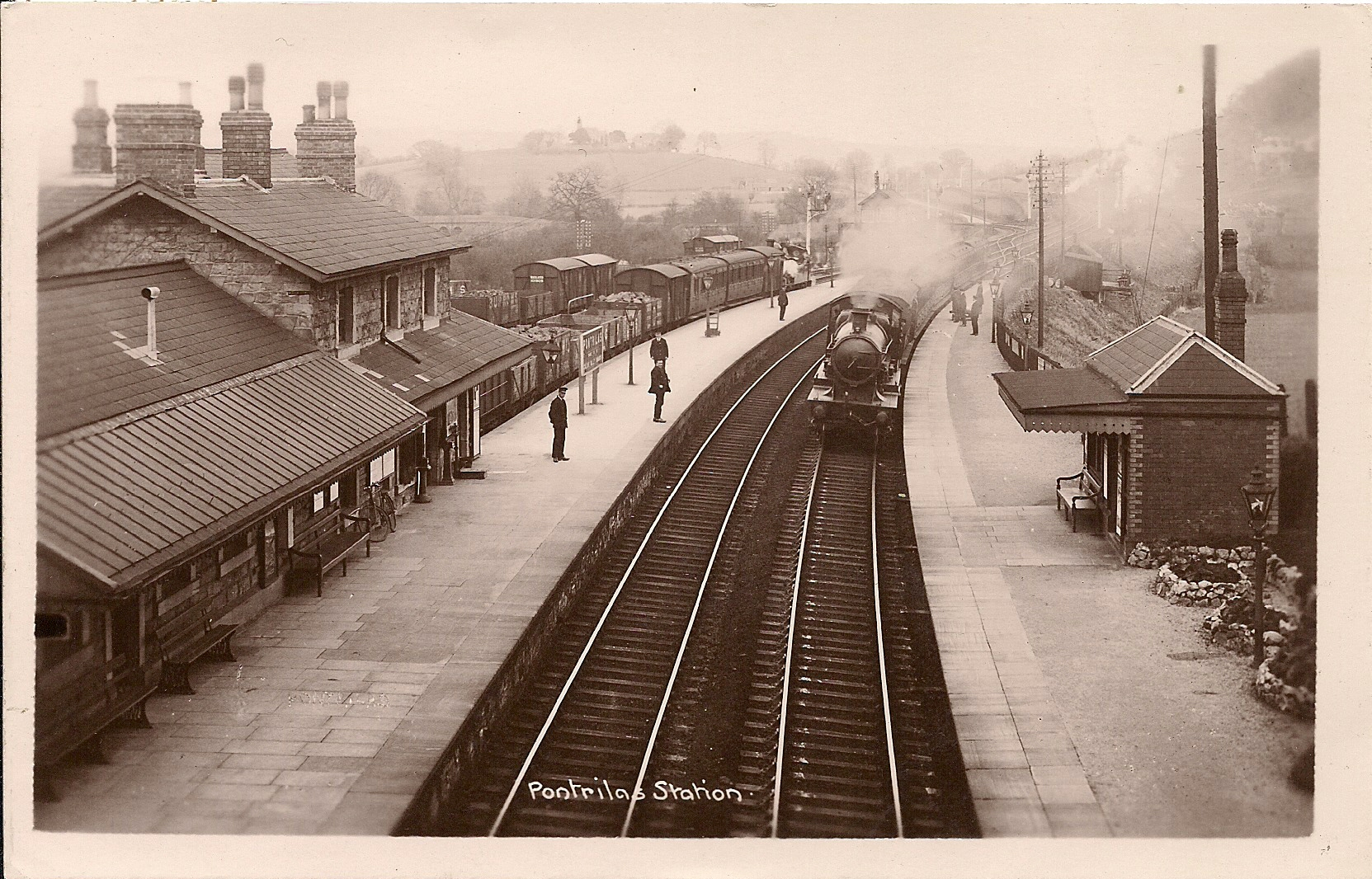
Postcard from 1927 at the busy junction station

The station closed in 1958 (see Pontrilas).

The remaining railway infrastructure includes the operating signal box. The sidings are still in use for infrastructure work and, less often, as a freight loop. It is at the end of the long climb from Abergavenny; freight and steam specials on this route provide a noisy spectacle coming through the station site. In the southbound direction the long section between Pontrilas and Abergavenny frequently results in trains being held here awaiting a clear run into Abergavenny.

The branch line junction and bridge, crossing the A465 onto the Golden Valley Railway, has been demolished in road widening - only the abutment to the bridge remains.

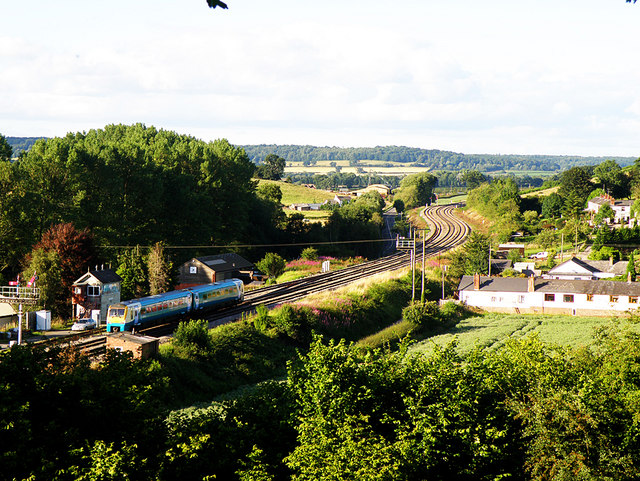
Arriva Trains Wales service passing the disused station

During the 1990s rail freight operated to this set of sidings, delivering wood to Pontrilas Sawmill. Plans were even mooted to open a short siding into it; this would have had to cross the A465 or replace the missing Golden Valley bridge so was unlikely. Freight traffic ended when British Rail closed its Freightliner service.

A large online model railway retailer - OnTracks.co.uk – was based in the business unit below the signal box. The unit was then occupied by Golden Valley Hobbies, who operated a similar online store but moved out in 2022.

There are plans to open a new station for the village.

In March 2020, a bid was made to the Restoring Your Railway fund to get funds for a feasibility study into reinstating the station. This bid was unsuccessful.

In October 2023, the local authority said plans to reopen the station had been shelved as they claimed it was poor value for money. The local authority also claimed that most passengers using the station would have instead used another station or the local bus network.

Also October 2023, the local authority then took the opposite view that they could now make the plan work. The apparent contradiction likely due to media interpretations of differing opinions within the council

Preceding station	Historical railways	Following station
Abbeydore; Line and station closed	Great Western Railway; Golden Valley Railway	Terminus
St Devereux; Line open, station closed	Great Western Railway; Welsh Marches line	Pandy; Line open, station closed
