= Dore Abbey =

Monastery in Herefordshire, England

Coordinates: 51.96778°N 2.89368°W

- Church of the Holy Trinity & St Mary, Abbey Dore
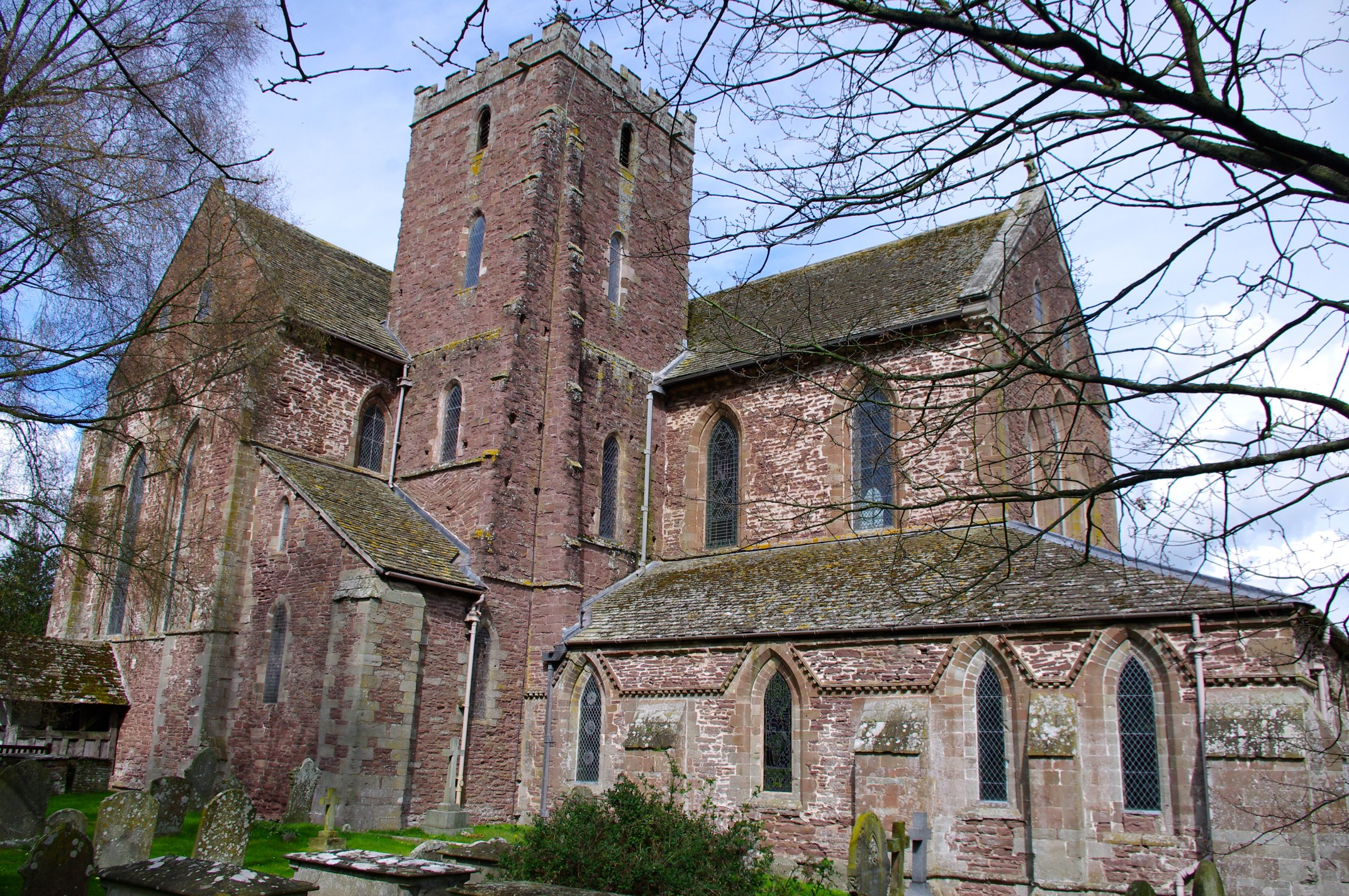
- Dore Abbey
- Dore Abbey
- OS grid reference: SO 38717 30401
- Location: Abbey Dore, Herefordshire
- Country: England
- Denomination: Church of England
- Website: http://www.doreabbey.org.uk/

Architecture
- Years built: 1147 onwards

Administration
- Diocese: Hereford
- Parish: Abbey Dore

Clergy
- Vicar: Revd Luci Morriss

Dore Abbey is a former Cistercian abbey in the village of Abbey Dore in the Golden Valley, Herefordshire, England. A large part of the original medieval building has been used since the 16th century as the parish church, with remaining parts either now ruined or no longer extant.

== History ==
The abbey was founded in 1147 by Robert fitzHarold of Ewyas, the Lord of Ewyas Harold, possibly on the site of earlier wooden monastic buildings of which no traces remain. The abbey is located close to the River Dore. It was formed as a daughter house of the Cistercian abbey at Morimond in France, perhaps after Lord Robert had met the Abbot of Morimond on the Second Crusade. Construction of buildings in local sandstone began around 1175, and continued through the time of the first three abbots, Adam (1186-c.1216), Adam II (c.1216–1236), and Stephen of Worcester (1236–1257). The design of the church was modelled on that of Morimond, with a presbytery, two chapels, two transepts, a crossing and a nave.

Gerald of Wales claimed that the first Abbot Adam was a devious individual intent on acquiring property by any means, fair or foul. During the early 13th century, the abbey expanded its land holdings, particularly through the acquisition of good quality farmland in the area granted to them by King John in 1216. This enabled the abbey to become wealthy, especially through the sale of wool, and as a result the abbey was largely rebuilt in the Early English style. The presbytery was expanded, and additional chapels, a processional ambulatory, and domestic buildings including a chapter house were added. In 1260, the abbey was described as a "sumptuous church". The new building was consecrated by Thomas de Cantilupe, Bishop of Hereford, in 1282, and was dedicated to the Holy Trinity and Saint Mary. Around 1305, Richard Straddell (d.1346) became Abbot. He was a distinguished scholar and theologian who at times served as a diplomat for the crown. In 1321 he was given a relic of the Holy Cross by William de Gradisson, and the abbey became a centre of pilgrimage.

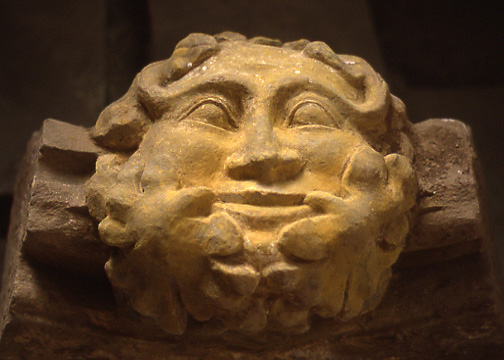
The Green Man roof boss from Dore Abbey

Large parts of the 12th- and 13th-century buildings, including the north and south transepts and the interior columns, together with some tiles, wooden fittings and fragments of stained glass, remain in place today, incorporated into the later church. The building also houses two 13th-century effigies, thought to be those of a later Lord Robert of Ewyas and his half-brother Roger de Clifford (d.1286), and carved stone roof bosses.

The abbey was run with the aid of seventeen granges, nine in the Golden Valley, four in northern Gwent, and three far to the west in Brycheiniog, centred on the parish of Gwenddwr; these last were at the extreme limit of the distance granges were supposed to be, a day's journey from the abbey. The abbey also owned property in Hereford and elsewhere, and drew revenues from five appropriated parishes.

The abbey was dissolved in 1536. The building was bought by a local landowner, John Scudamore, a member of a gentry family historically connected with Owain Glyndŵr. Some items were hidden but most of the building was allowed to fall into disrepair. The surviving building was restored in the 1630s by his great-great-grandson John Scudamore, 1st Viscount Scudamore, who, after the early deaths of several of his children, became convinced that he should make amends for living off the proceeds of former monastic land. Scudamore was a friend of William Laud, Archbishop of Canterbury, who is believed to have influenced the re-design and rebuilding of the church, for its use as a parish church. The original mediaeval altar was found in a nearby farm, being used for salting meat and making cheese, and was returned to the church. The original nave was blocked off and a new tower erected, and a new carved oak rood screen, incorporating the arms of Scudamore, Laud, and King Charles I, was made by John Abel of Hereford. In addition, new stained glass was provided, and the walls were painted with instructional pictures and texts, many of which remain visible. The new church was re-consecrated on 22 March 1634. Further restoration was carried out between 1700 and 1710, and new paintings, including a large coat of arms of Queen Anne, were added.

By the end of the nineteenth century the church was again in need of repair, and work was carried out by a local architect, Roland Paul, in 1901–09. Paul was also responsible for part-excavating and plotting the remaining foundations and traces of the original Abbey buildings, which now underlie the churchyard.

== Churchyard ==
The churchyard contains the war grave of Driver William John Watkins, a Royal Field Artillery soldier of World War I.

== Other burials ==
- Roger de Clifford (1189–1232)
- Sibil d'Ewyas Clifford, his wife (1178–1236)
- Roger de Clifford, their son (1215–86)

== See also ==
- List of English abbeys, priories and friaries serving as parish churches
- Operation Icarus – the police investigation into the organised theft of art from churches, including Dore Abbey
