= Dorstone railway station =

Former railway station in Herefordshire, England

Dorstone
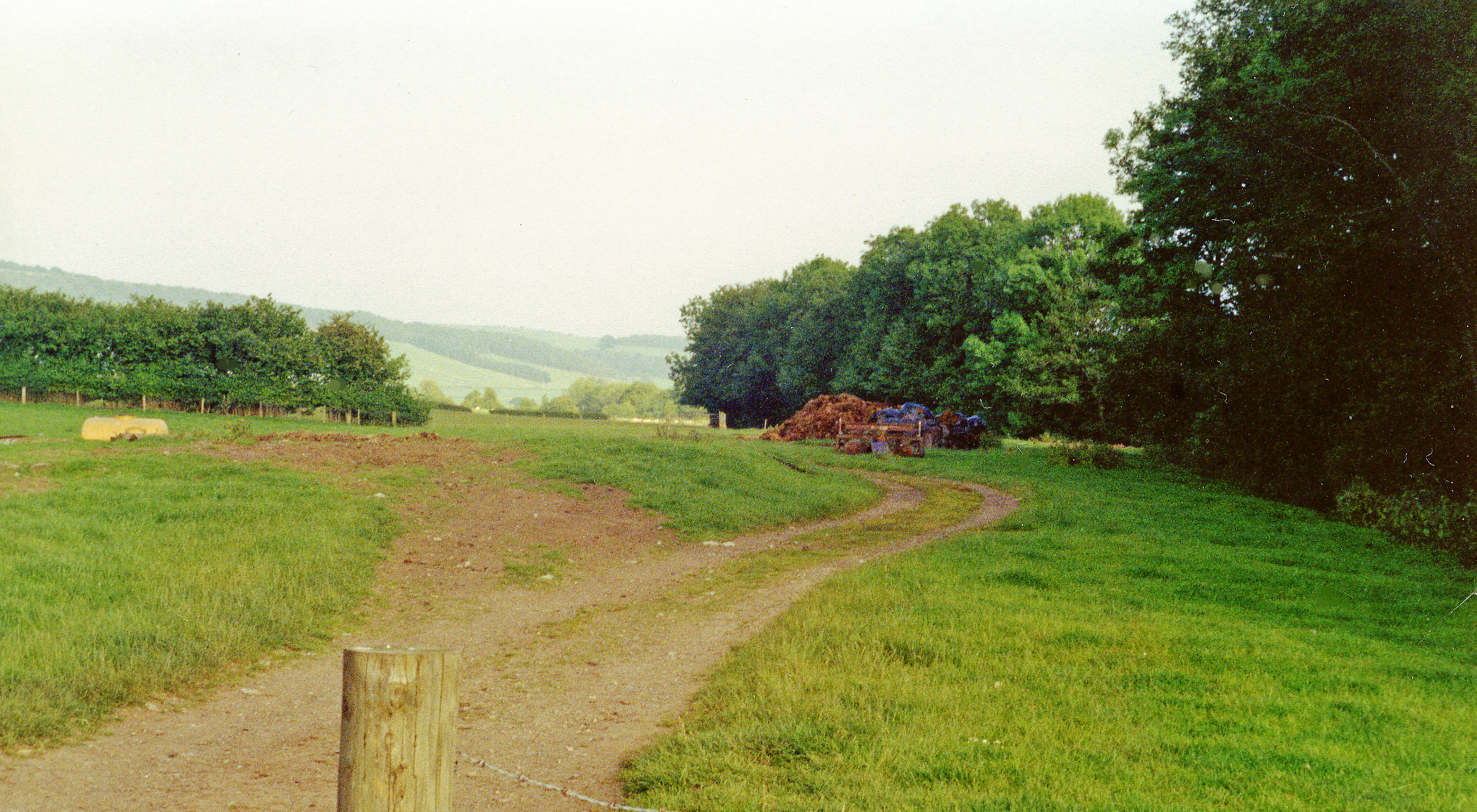
- The site of the station in 1994

General information
- Location: Dorstone, Herefordshire; England
- Coordinates: 52.0713°N 2.9976°W
- Grid reference: SO317419
- Platforms: 2

Other information
- Status: Disused

History
- Original company: Golden Valley Railway
- Pre-grouping: Great Western Railway
- Post-grouping: Great Western Railway

Key dates
- 1 September 1881: Opened
- 8 December 1941: Closed to passengers
- 1953: Closed
Location

Dorstone railway station was a station in Dorstone, Herefordshire, England. The station was opened in 1881, closed to passengers in 1941 and closed completely in 1953.

Preceding station	Historical railways	Following station
Westbrook; Line and station closed	Great Western Railway; Golden Valley Railway	Peterchurch; Line and station closed
