= Newton, Golden Valley =

Village in Herefordshire, England

Coordinates: 51.994189°N 2.9585892°W

Newton
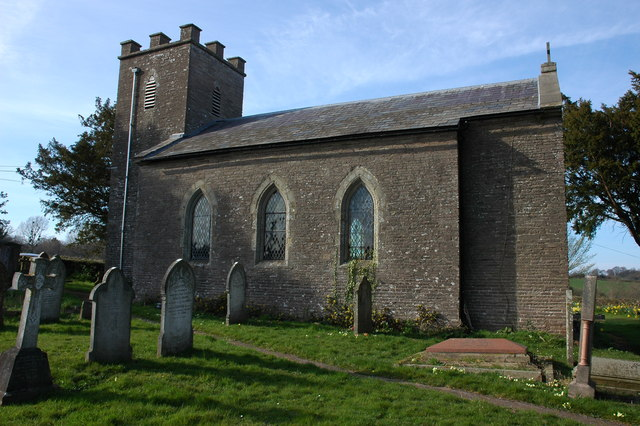

- Location within Herefordshire
- Area: 7.085 km^{2} (2.736 sq mi)
- Population: 139 (2011 census)
  - Density: 20/km^{2} (52/sq mi)
- Civil parish: Newton
- Unitary authority: County of Herefordshire
- Shire county: Herefordshire
- Region: West Midlands
- Country: England
- Sovereign state: United Kingdom
- Police: West Mercia
- Fire: Hereford and Worcester
- Ambulance: West Midlands

Newton is a village and civil parish 11 miles (18 km) south west of Hereford, in the county of Herefordshire, England. In 2011 the parish had a population of 139. The parish touches Dulas, Longtown, Michaelchurch Escley and St. Margarets. Newton shares a parish council with Michaelchurch Escley, St Margarets, Turnastone and Vowchurch called "Vowchurch and District Group Parish Council".

== Landmarks ==
There are 16 listed buildings in Newton. Newton has a church called St John the Baptist.

== History ==
The name "Newton" means 'New farm/settlement'. Newton was formerly a township and chapelry in the parish of Clodock, in 1866 Newton became a civil parish in its own right.
