= Turnastone =

Village in Herefordshire, England

Coordinates: 52.022404°N 2.9380814°W

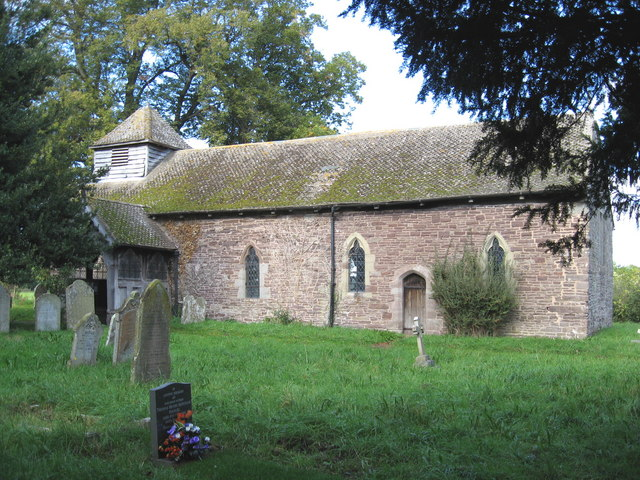

- Location within Herefordshire
- Area: 2.175 km^{2} (0.840 sq mi)
- Population: 28 (2001 census)
  - Density: 13/km^{2} (34/sq mi)
- Civil parish: Turnastone
- Unitary authority: County of Herefordshire
- Shire county: Herefordshire
- Region: West Midlands
- Country: England
- Sovereign state: United Kingdom
- Police: West Mercia
- Fire: Hereford and Worcester
- Ambulance: West Midlands

Turnastone is a village and civil parish 10 miles (16 km) west of Hereford, in the county of Herefordshire, England. In 2001 the parish had a population of 28. The parish touches St. Margarets and Vowchurch. Turnastone shares a parish council with Michaelchurch Escley, Newton, St Margarets and Vowchurch called "Vowchurch and District Group Parish Council".

== Landmarks ==
There are 12 listed buildings in Turnastone. Turnastone has a church called St Mary Magdalene.

== History ==
The name "Turnastone" means 'de Turnei's town' and it was probably earlier called "Wluetone" from Robert de Turuei, who held the manor after the Conquest.
