= Snodhill Castle =

Castle in Herefordshire, England

- Herefordshire, England
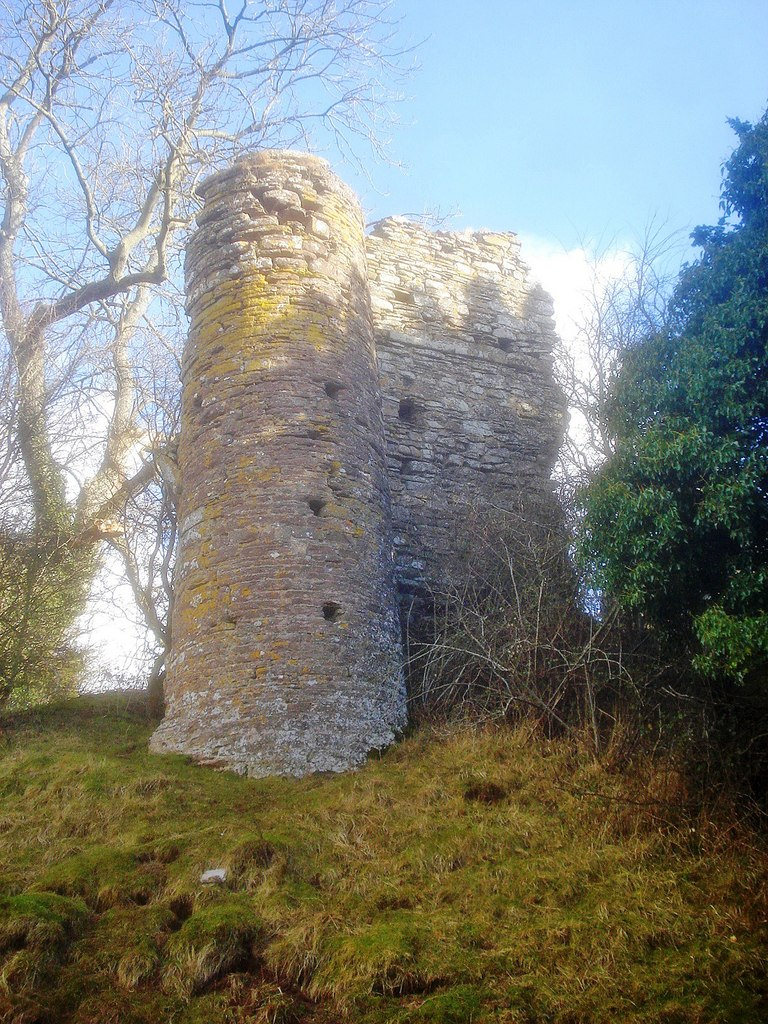
- Snodhill Castle; the southwest corner of the high keep

Site information
- Type: Motte-and-bailey castle
- Owner: Snodhill Castle Preservation Trust
- Open to the public: Public access
- Condition: Ruined

Location
- Shown within Herefordshire.
- Location within Herefordshire
- Coordinates: 52.057650°N 2.989889°W
- Grid reference: grid reference SO322403

Snodhill Castle is a ruined motte-and-bailey castle, about 1 mi (1.6 km) south of the village of Dorstone in west Herefordshire, England. It is recognized as one of the major castles of the Welsh Marches. It was built in the 11th century to secure the border between Norman England and the Welsh Princes. Archaeological excavations show that it was one of the first Norman castles in England to have stone-built fortifications, with more sophisticated defences being added in later centuries.

The castle was first referenced in 1142. Although it was recorded as being in decay in the mid-16th century, it was thought to still be in use during the 17th century. It remained in private hands until 2013, when a 999 year lease was obtained by Historic England to enable repairs to the castle. Historic England first passed the lease to the Vivat Trust and then in 2016 the lease was passed onto the Snodhill Castle Preservation Trust.

== History ==
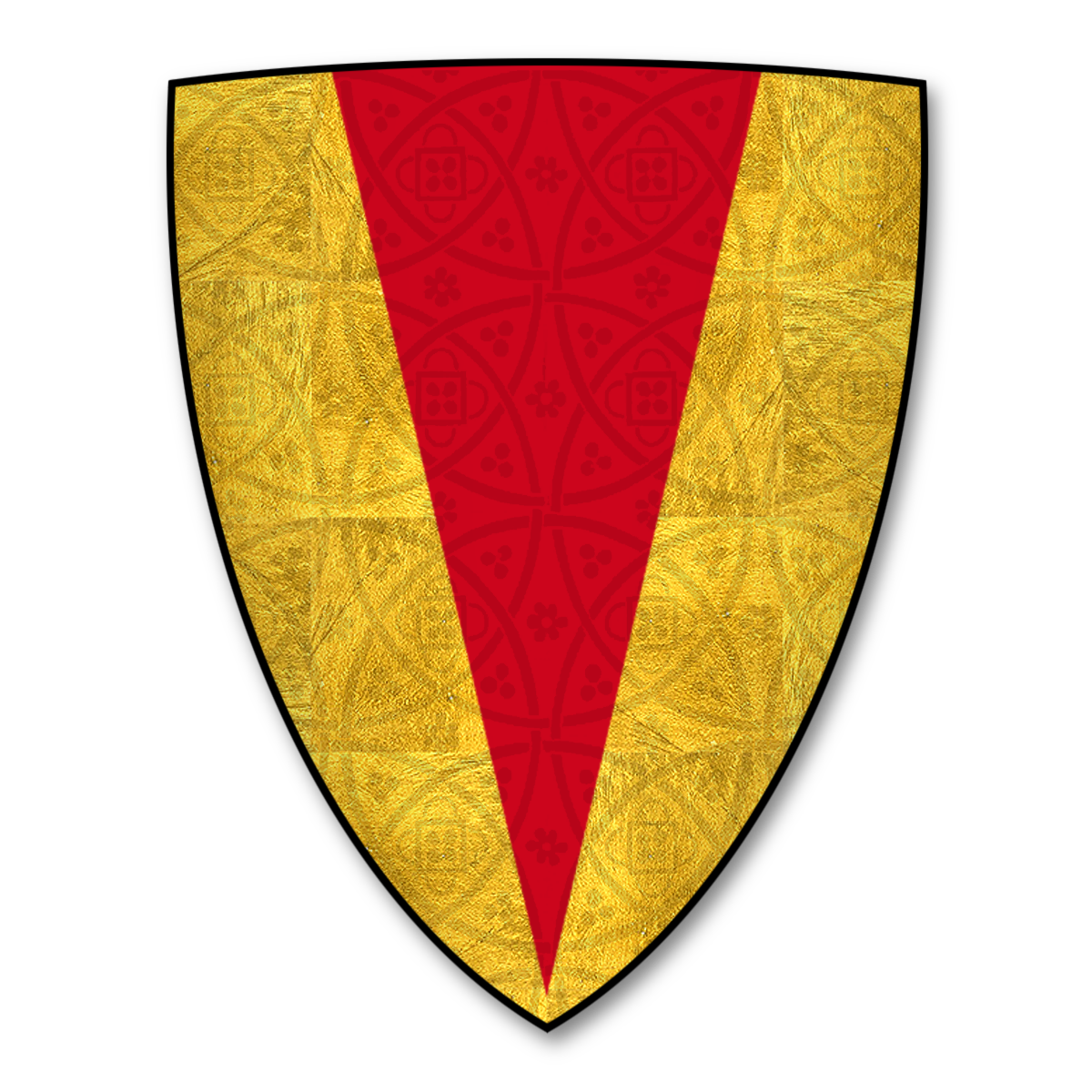
The armorial bearings of the Chandos family, who held the manor and castle of Snodhill between 1127 and 1428.

The origins of the castle are obscure, there were two theories about its creation: one, that it was built by a follower of William FitzOsbern, 1st Earl of Hereford before 1086 and two, that it was built by Roger de Chandos after a land exchange with Malvern Priory in 1127. However recent archaeological investigation finding a very early stone hall keep buried beneath (and incorporated into) the existing multangular keep on top of the motte (the motte dating from 1167) and similarly early curtain walls defining a small triangular bailey have led to re-evaluation of the castle's early history. It is now thought that the castle did not have an initial timber phase, and that it was built in stone from its foundation in 1067 by FitzOsbern himself, and completed before his death in 1071. He is known to have built other early stone castles, Chepstow Castle being the most famous, with stone defences at Monmouth Castle, Clifford Castle and Wigmore Castle supposedly built by him as well.

Snodhill Castle was then granted to Hugh L'Asne before FitzOsbern's death in 1071, the whole border area from Chepstow to Shropshire having been parceled up and granted by the Earl to his close supporters. The castle was held by Hugh L'Asne until his death in 1101 when it, and all of Hugh L'Asne's manors, passed by marriage to Robert de Chandos I.

The castle was held and further developed by the Chandos family until the 15th century. In 1401, John Chandos was ordered by Henry IV to refortify his castle against the Welsh Revolt of Owain Glyndŵr. Chandos obeyed the king by building a large tower in the castle's main bailey (acting as a second keep) and thickening the bailey cross-wall. These additions resulted in Snodhill Castle not being destroyed during Owain Glyndŵr's attacks on Herefordshire. Chandos died without an heir in 1428 and his holdings were inherited by the Beauchamp family, relatives of his wife. It was briefly held by Richard Neville, 16th Earl of Warwick, known as "Warwick the Kingmaker," and then, through the marriage of Anne Beauchamp, passed to Richard of York (later Richard III). Following this, it became a royal castle.

In 1540, the area was visited by the antiquary John Leland who described the castle as follows:

There is a castell a mile and more benethe Dorston apon the right ripe of Dour. It is called Snothil, and ther is a parke wallyd, and a castle in it on a hill caulled Southill, and therby is undar the castle a quarrey of marble. The castle is somewhat in ruine. Ther is a Fre Chappell. This castle longyd to Chandos.

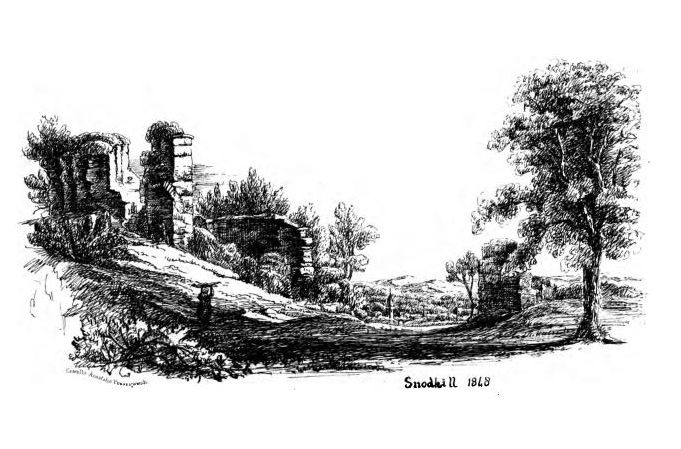
Engraving of Snodhill Castle in 1848

Elizabeth I granted Snodhill, along with other Warwick holdings, to Robert Dudley, 1st Earl of Leicester. Some sources state that the castle was besieged during the English Civil Wars, Evidence has been found for both slighting of the keep and organized demolition after the civil war. By the mid-17th century, the manor and castle had gone into the hands of the Prosser family and their relatives, the Powells, who held the property until it was sold in 1940.

The castle was briefly surveyed by the Royal Commission on the Historical Monuments of England and it was scheduled under the Ancient Monuments Act in July 1933. The deterioration of the surviving fabric resulted in Snodhill being added to the Heritage at Risk Register in 1988. Surveys of the castle were conducted in 2012 and 2015 by English Heritage, and in 2016 the castle passed into the care of the Snodhill Castle Preservation Trust, a charity formed by concerned local people with the support of Historic England. Work commenced on clearing vegetation in 2016, and consolidating the masonry with grants from Historic England in 2017 and the Garfield Weston Foundation in 2019.

The castle is now fully repaired and open to the public. The castle’s charitable trust maintains the site and has organised archaeological excavations led by Herefordshire Archaeology every year since 2016.

== Description ==
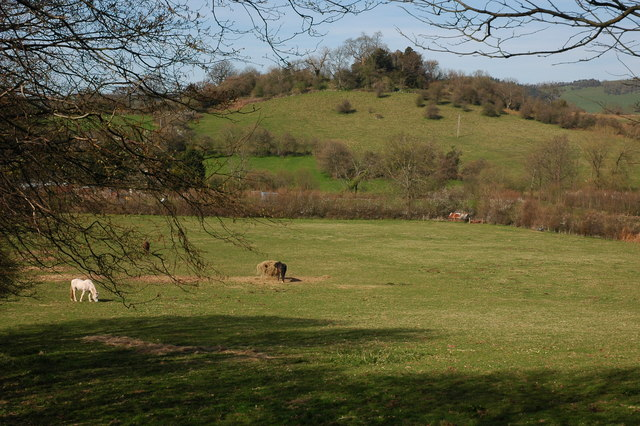
Snodhill Castle viewed from the south in 2007.

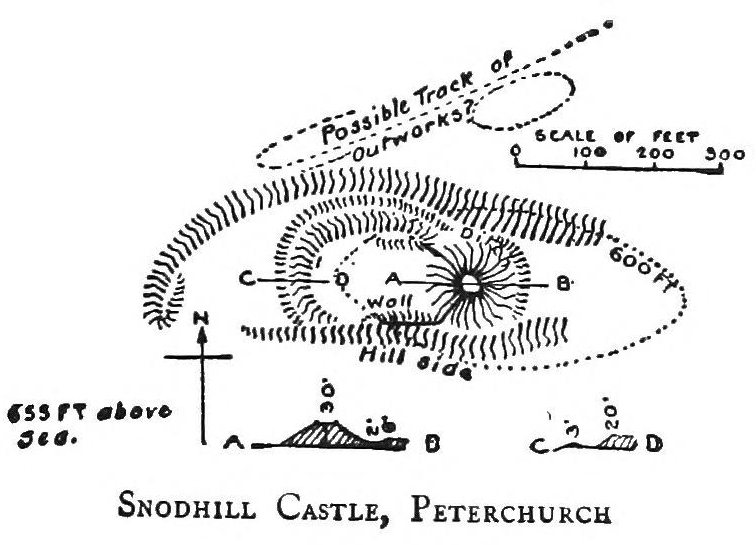
Plan of Snodhill Castle, published in 1908.

The castle is in the northwestern end of the Golden Valley in Herefordshire, and sits on the summit of a small and steep-sided hill between the River Dore and its tributary, the Snodhill Stream.

=== Motte ===
The motte or artificial mound, stands between 7.5 metres (25 ft) and 14 metres (46 ft) above the surrounding earthworks, and is about 44 metres (144 ft) in diameter at the base. The entire top of the motte is occupied by the substantial remnants of a masonry keep or great tower. Polygonal in plan, the base of the tower appears to have been thirteen-sided, but above the first floor level, the surviving southern section suggests an irregular ten-sided construction required to make the best use of the motte's summit. This change in configuration was the result of an early collapse of the keep, and there are indications of multiple build and repair phases.

The west front was later remodelled by the addition of a solid drum-shaped tower in the southwest, and it is presumed that a second one was built in the northwest, although no discernible trace of this was found during excavations. The towers abutted an arched gateway, the arch head of which survives along with a groove for a portcullis. The construction of the motte was immediately after the Norman Conquest in 1066. The polygonal form of the keep has been dated to 1160 and is similar to the nearby example of Richard's Castle. The drum towers were possibly added in the late 14th or early 15th century.

=== Baileys ===
An inner bailey defined by a steep earthen rampart extends to the west of the motte. There is a shallow ditch on the east side of the motte, the main bailey being surrounded by unusual terraces. The remains of a stone-built curtain wall and the chapel tower are visible on the south side and partly on the west and north sides, and there remains a very large tower (recently excavated) in the north. A cross-wall (following the line of the early Norman walls) divided the bailey into two portions. Traces of several substantial buildings within the bailey are discernible. A modern footpath enters the bailey in the southwest.

After extensive archaeological investigation (and the discovery of a 17th-century plan of the castle) it has been concluded that the main entrance was in this southwest corner; the recent discovery of a heavily-fortified postern in the northeast of the inner bailey confirmed this conclusion as this was the last remaining alternative location. A putative outer bailey may have been located on a flat area below and to the west of the inner bailey ditch, and another larger bailey is indicated to the east of the motte. If the west and east baileys are confirmed as baileys, Snodhill Castle will be proven to be one of the largest early Norman castles in the country.

=== Royal Free Chapel ===
The Royal Free Chapel of Snodhill is a historical and ecclesiastical oddity, being the only royal chapel built within a lordship castle (all other royal chapels are built within royal castles). It had chaplains personally appointed by the monarch from at least the 13th century through to the 16th century, and was still in use in 1597. Appointees included Robert Fayrfax, a composer employed by Henry VII.

It was then demolished so comprehensively that even its site was lost for more than 400 years. However, in 2022, archaeologists working at the castle confirmed the location and survival of the chapel’s remains in the southeast corner of the castle’s main bailey, and an appeal was launched to raise funds to restore the chapel and permit public access, the Chapel is now fully excavated and on display to the public.

=== Snodhill Court ===
A substantial 17th-century stone manor house is located about 200 metres (220 yd) to the west, and probably incorporates much stonework from the castle including some carved corbels at the main entrance and elsewhere, which matched carvings found in the Royal Chapels excavations of 2022.
