= Pontrilas Army Training Area =

British Army training camp in England

- Pontrilas, Herefordshire
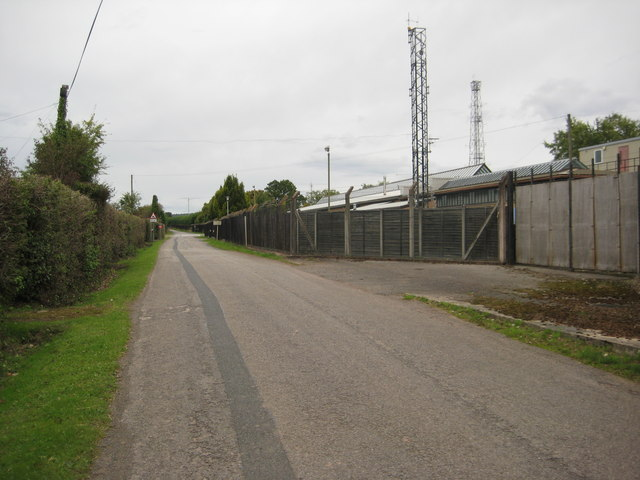
- Pontrilas Army Training Area

Site information
- Type: Barracks
- Owner: Ministry of Defence
- Operator: British Army

Location
- Location within Herefordshire
- Coordinates: 51.96556°N 2.87611°W

Site history
- Built: 1930s
- Built for: War Office
- In use: 1930s-Present

Pontrilas Army Training Area is a British Army training camp, located just north of the village of Ewyas Harold near to Pontrilas in Herefordshire, England. Originally developed pre-World War II by the Ministry of Defence (MoD) as an ammunition dump, it was served by the Golden Valley Railway.

== History ==
During the 1930s, there was a recognition of a need to provide secure storage for munitions within the United Kingdom. The proposal was to create three central ammunition depots (CAD): one in the south (Monkton Farleigh); one in the north of England (Longtown, Cumbria); and one in the Midlands (Nesscliffe).

Beyond these, a series of sub-depots was created by the MoD in the area, to allow further distribution. Each was connected to the national rail network, and was laid out over an extensive area to avoid total destruction should an accidental explosion occur, or the site be attacked by an enemy.

Named Elm Bridge, the servicing railway branch line was just before Abbeydore railway station and the level crossing. Unlike the main CAD's, the initial war-time onsite batch of locomotives and train drivers was provided by the Great Western Railway, which also maintained the extensive onsite network. Always guarded by the Royal Military Police and serviced by regular troops, it was only after the war from 1948 that the Royal Engineers provided the onsite logistics.

After the closure and lifting of the Golden Valley Railway to Dorstone in 1953 and cessation of passenger services, the line was maintained as a freight-only facility to service the depot until its closure in 1957.

== Present ==
Retained as an MoD facility, its remote location and proximity to the Special Air Service headquarters at Hereford meant that it has been utilised as a training base in some form since closure of the depot. Although never confirmed officially, the training facility has been used by various special forces, including "The Det".

Presently managed by QinetiQ on behalf of the MoD, they have installed various facilities which are used in counter-terrorism (CT) and assault training.

In September 2006, Lance Corporal Gordon Campbell of the 1 Assault Group Royal Marines, aged 28, while fast-roping from a helicopter whilst on a training exercise at PATA, fell to the ground and died.
