= Vowchurch railway station =

Former railway station in Herefordshire, England

Vowchurch

General information
- Location: Vowchurch, Herefordshire; England
- Coordinates: 52.0216°N 2.9331°W
- Grid reference: SO359363
- Platforms: 1

Other information
- Status: Disused

History
- Original company: Golden Valley Railway
- Pre-grouping: Great Western Railway
- Post-grouping: Great Western Railway

Key dates
- 1 September 1881: Opened
- 22 October 1883: Closed
- 17 November 1883: Reopened
- 2 July 1885: Closed
- 19 August 1885: Reopened
- 20 April 1898: Closed
- 1 May 1901: Reopened
- 15 December 1941: Closed
Location

Vowchurch railway station was a railway station on the Golden Valley Railway line between Abergavenny and Hay-on-Wye. It served the village of Vowchurch in Herefordshire, England, from 1881. The station closed and re-opened three times before the line's closure to passenger services in 1941.

The station comprised a single platform adjacent to the road and level crossing. To the west there was a goods yard which was particularly used for shipping timber. Construction materials for RAF Madley were brought through the yard during World War II. Goods services continued on the line until 1949.

Preceding station	Historical railways	Following station
Peterchurch; Line and station closed	Great Western Railway; Golden Valley Railway	Bacton; Line and station closed
