= Dorstone Castle =

Castle in Dorstone, Herefordshire, England

Coordinates: 52.06848°N 3.00511°W

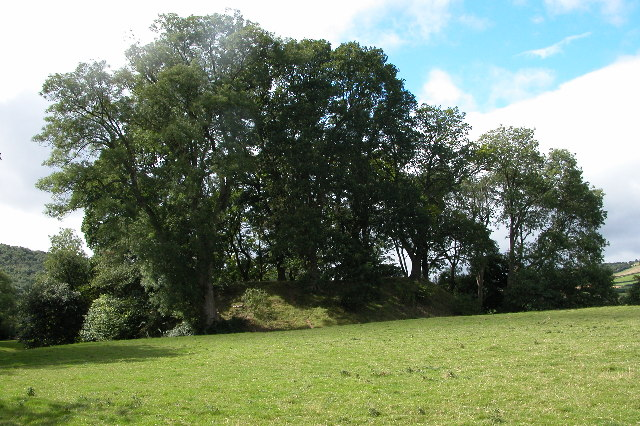
Earthworks of Dorstone Castle

Dorstone Castle was in the village of Dorstone in Herefordshire, England, located 6 miles to the east of Hay-on-Wye.

== Motte and bailey ==
This castle was a motte-and-bailey castle which originated in the late 11th- early 12th century (around 1094/5) when the site was held by the de Sollers family. The castle was probably built by the knight Humphrey De Sollers who was a knight under the command of Bernard de Neufmarché.

== Strengthened against Owain ==
In 1403 Henry IV entrusted the castle to Sir Walter Fitzwalter, related to Baron FitzWalter, and asked him to strengthen it against likely raids by Welsh forces of Owain Glyndŵr.

After this time Dorstone Castle changed hands several times. Lady Fitzwalter died about 1422, and afterwards the castle belonged to Richard de la Mare of the de la Mare family and was then owned by the Lysters who sold it to Morgan Aubrey. It was then purchased by the Cornewall family of nearby Moccas Court in 1780.

Only the earthworks now remain.
