= Arthur's Stone, Herefordshire =

Dolmen in England

Arthur's Stone
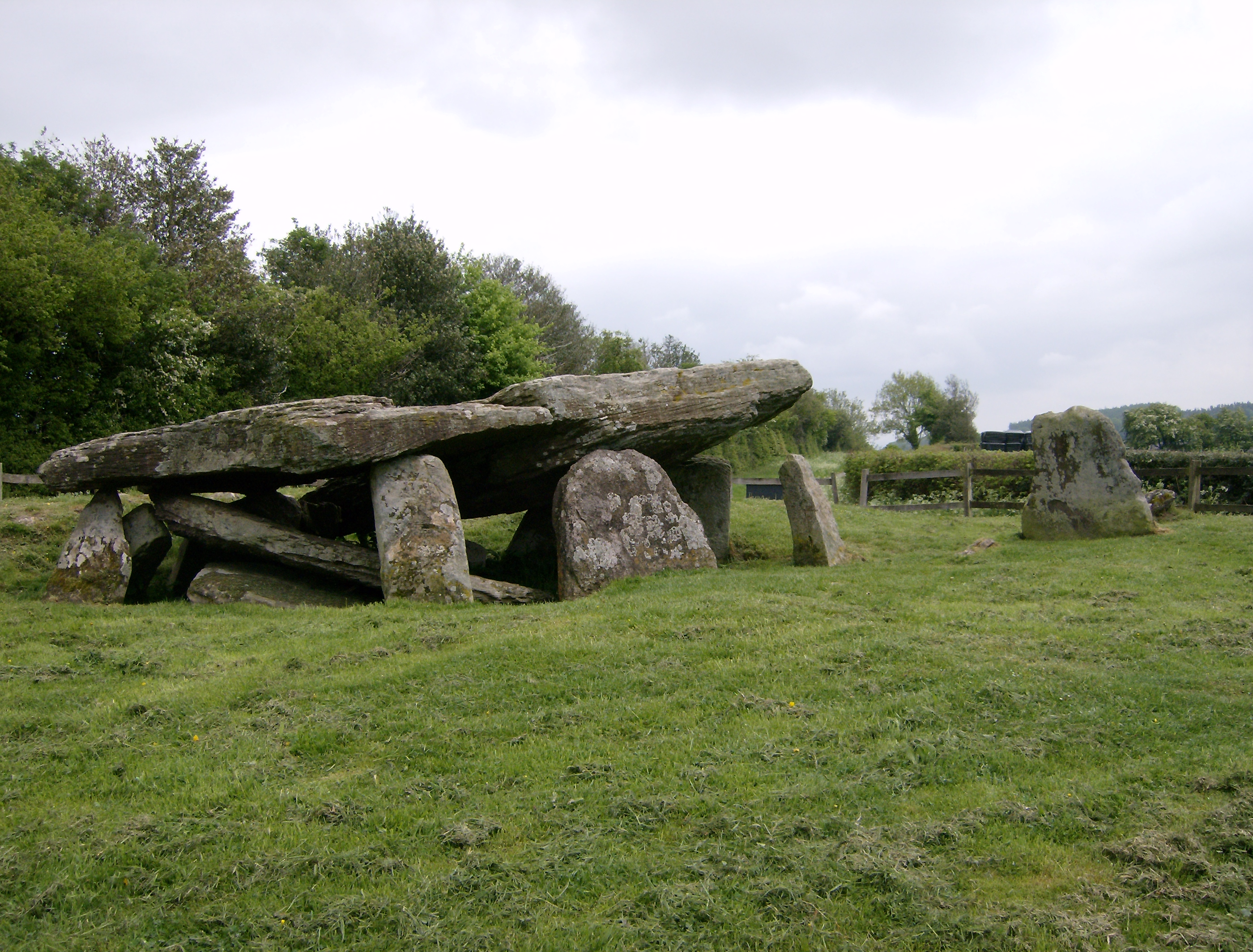
- The tomb in 2008

- Location in England, United Kingdom
- 52°04′56.3″N 02°59′43.3″W
- Type: Tomb
- Location: Herefordshire, England, United Kingdom
- OS grid reference: SO318430

History
- Built: c. 3200 BC

Site notes
- Material: Stone

Arthur's Stone is a Neolithic chambered tomb, or dolmen, in Herefordshire, England. It is situated on the ridge line of a hill overlooking both the Golden Valley, Herefordshire and the Wye Valley. The tomb dates from 3700 BC – 2700 BC.

== Location ==
Arthur's Stone is located between the villages of Dorstone and Bredwardine, and more generally between Hereford to the east and Hay-on-Wye to the west, at Ordnance Survey grid reference SO318430. The tomb commands an elevated view to the south of the Golden Valley and the Brecon Beacons in the distance, and is bounded to the north by a small road (Arthur's Stone Lane) which dissects what would originally have been the site of the tomb's elongated mound.

== Description ==
The tomb is topped by a large capstone, estimated to weigh more than 25 tonnes. The capstone rests on nine uprights and there is a curved, 4.6 m (15 ft) long entrance passageway.

To the north, there was once a cup-marked stone called the Quoit Stone. This can no longer be clearly seen, and now a stone to the south of the monument has become known as the Quoit Stone.

The stones would originally have been buried within a mound, aligned north-south and of approximately 25 metres in length with an east-facing entrance and a south-facing false portal. The mound is now, however, almost completely eroded and the capstone is broken with a large section fallen from its underside.

The site is defined and protected by a wooden fence.

The site is seen as a northerly outlier of the well known Severn-Cotswold tomb Group of chambered tombs and one of five Neolithic tombs in the local area. The site appears to be oriented towards Ysgyryd Fawr mountain in Wales.

== Etymology ==
The tomb is one of many prehistoric monuments in western England and Wales to be linked with the legend of King Arthur. Some tales suggest the tomb was built to mark the location of one of King Arthur's battles, while others tell that the stones were already present when Arthur slew a giant on the spot, who fell onto the stones and left indentations in one of them, which remain to this day. Others suggest the indentations on the Quoit Stone were left by Arthur's knees or elbows as he knelt there to pray. Some 19th century sources give it the name "King Arthur's Table".

== History ==
Excavations were undertaken by Nash in 2006, followed by preliminary excavations to the mound by Boucher and Rouse from Headland Archaeology (2011). Another excavation of the site was conducted in 2023.

== See also ==
- King Arthur's Round Table
