= Osbern Pentecost =

Norman knight

Sir Osbern Pentecost (died 27 July 1054) was a Norman knight who followed Edward the Confessor to England upon Edward's return from exile in Normandy in 1041.

He was one of the few Norman landholders in England prior to the Norman Conquest of England in 1066. Under the patronage of Ralph the Timid, Earl of Hereford, Osbern built the castle at Ewyas in Herefordshire in 1048, one of the first Motte and Bailey types to be constructed in England.

On the return from exile in 1052 of Godwin, Earl of Wessex, the Normans were banished from England. Osbern obtained a safe passage from Leofric of Mercia and ventured north to join the court of Macbeth, King of Scotland.

During Earl Siward's invasion of Scotland in 1054, Osbern Pentecost was one of the Normans killed at the Battle of Dunsinane on 27 July 1054, which was Siward's great defeat of the Scots.
