= Ewyas Harold Castle =

Former castle in Herefordshire, England

Coordinates: 51.95337°N 2.89630°W

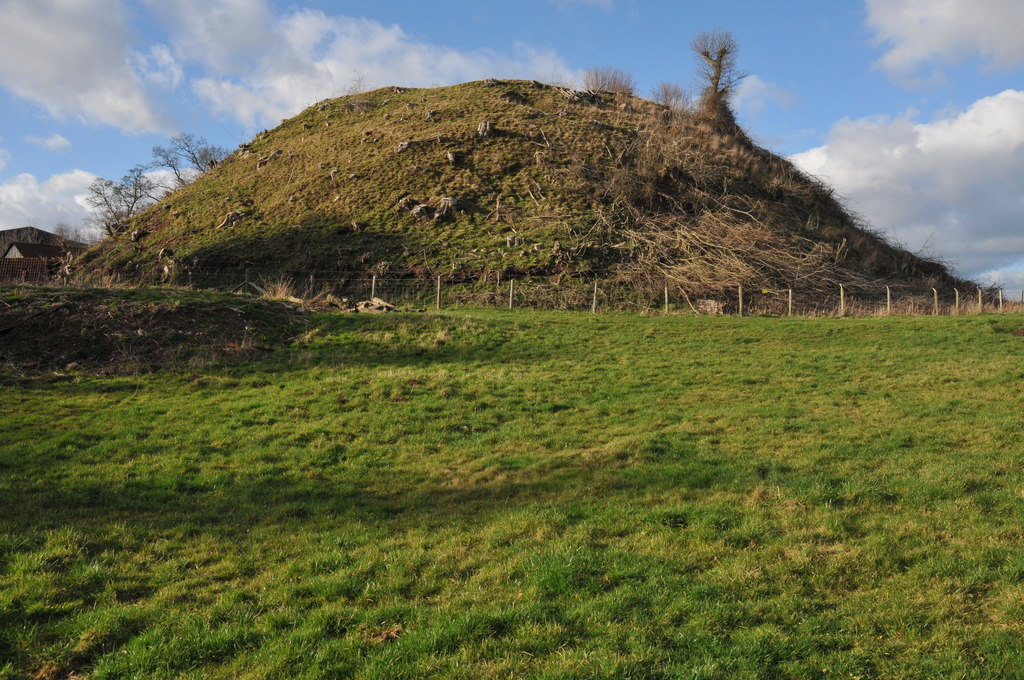
Ewyas Harold Castle motte

Ewyas Harold Castle was a castle in the village of Ewyas Harold in Herefordshire, England.

== History ==
The first castle on the site is believed to be one of the very few which were built under the Saxons before the Norman Conquest. This structure was likely raised in 1048, possibly by Osbern Pentecost, on the site of an earlier fortification, likely a Saxon burg built during the 10th century. It was a motte and bailey castle overlooking the Dulas Brook. In 1052 the original castle was destroyed, either on the orders of Earl Godwin or by the Welsh in a raid.

Following the Norman Conquest and invasion of the area the castle was rebuilt by William Fitz Osbern, Earl of Hereford. In 1086, the Domesday Book recorded:

In the jurisdiction of the castle of Ewyas Harold, Roger holds of Henry three churches and a priest and 32 acres (130,000 m^{2}) of land and they render two sesters of honey. In the castle he has two messuages.

In 1100 a priory was founded within the bailey of the castle.

The castle fell into partial decay until the early 15th century. It was then in the possession of William Beauchamp, Lord Abergavenny, who refortified it in the face of the threat from Owain Glyndŵr. There is no record of it being attacked at this time. Owain and his various forces focused their attention on strategies and opportunities elsewhere.

The castle again fell into ruin by 1645, and today only earthworks remain on the edge of the village to mark where it once stood.

== Sources ==
- Bannister, Arthur Thomas, The history of Ewias Harold, its castle, priory, and church (Hereford 1902)
