= River Dore =

River in Herefordshire, England

Coordinates: 51°57′N 2°52′W

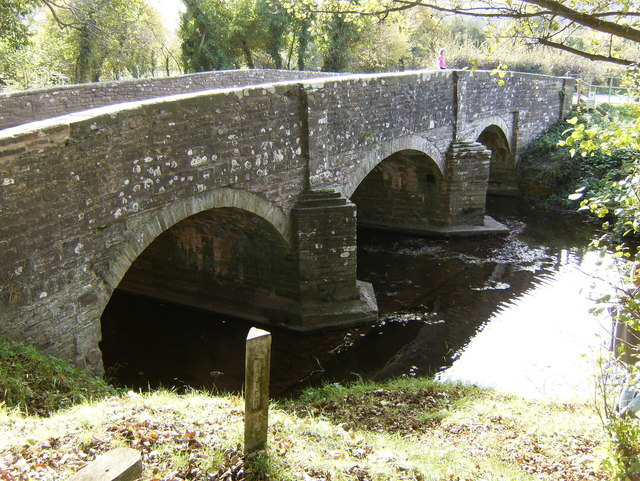
Road bridge over the River Dore at Vowchurch

The River Dore (Welsh: Afon Aur lit: 'the river of gold') is a tributary of the River Monnow in Herefordshire, England.

It rises on Cusop Hill, in the foothills of the Black Mountains, close to the border between England and Wales. It flows for 12 miles (19 km) through the villages of Dorstone, Peterchurch, Vowchurch, Abbey Dore and Pontrilas, before reaching the Monnow near Llangua. The Monnow itself is a tributary which flows into the River Wye at Monmouth.

The name Dore probably derives from the Welsh word dŵr, meaning "water". The word was later interpreted by the Norman French as "d'or", meaning "golden", and the river valley, through this misunderstanding, then became known in English as "Golden Valley".

The river is noted for its fishing, including trout and grayling. In 2006, the Game & Wildlife Conservation Trust initiated a programme to clear the river of invasive mink, and repopulate it with water voles.

As of 2022, there is a legal challenge against the building of an intensive poultry farm livestock unit which would contribute to the pollution to the river and also of the Wye, of which it is a tributary.

== 2011 drought ==
A two-mile section of the river ran dry in October 2011, this was attributed to unusually low rainfall during the spring and summer of 2011. Abstraction of water was not thought to be a major contributor according to the Environment Agency, the explanation being instead the effect of the local geology combined with low rainfall.
