= Golden Valley (Herefordshire) =

Valley in Herefordshire, United Kingdom

Coordinates: 52.016°N 2.927°W

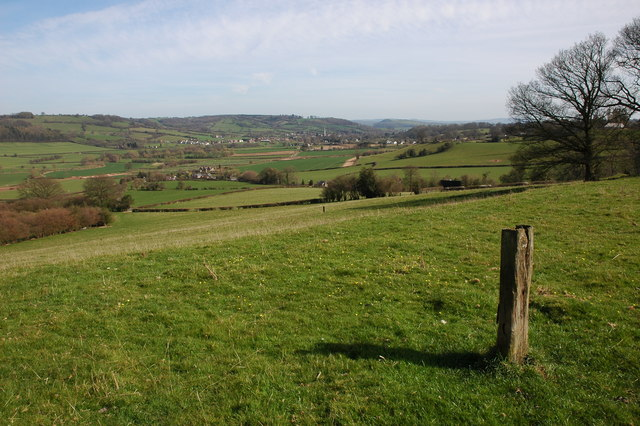
View down the Golden Valley from Old Hill Wood, with Peterchurch in the middle distance.

The Golden Valley is the name given to the valley of the River Dore in western Herefordshire, England. The valley is a picturesque area of gently rolling countryside. It lies in the lee of the Black Mountains, Wales.

The main villages are Dorstone, Peterchurch, Abbey Dore and Ewyas Harold.

== Origin of the name ==
The name Golden Valley probably derives from a confusion of the name of the River Dore with the French d'or, meaning 'of gold'. The Normans might have confused the Welsh word dŵr, meaning 'water', with 'd'or'. A similar situation occurred with the Douro river in Iberia (Spain and Portugal) where the Romance languages adopted the original Celtic name and changed the meaning to the similar-sounding precious metal.

== Local points of interest ==
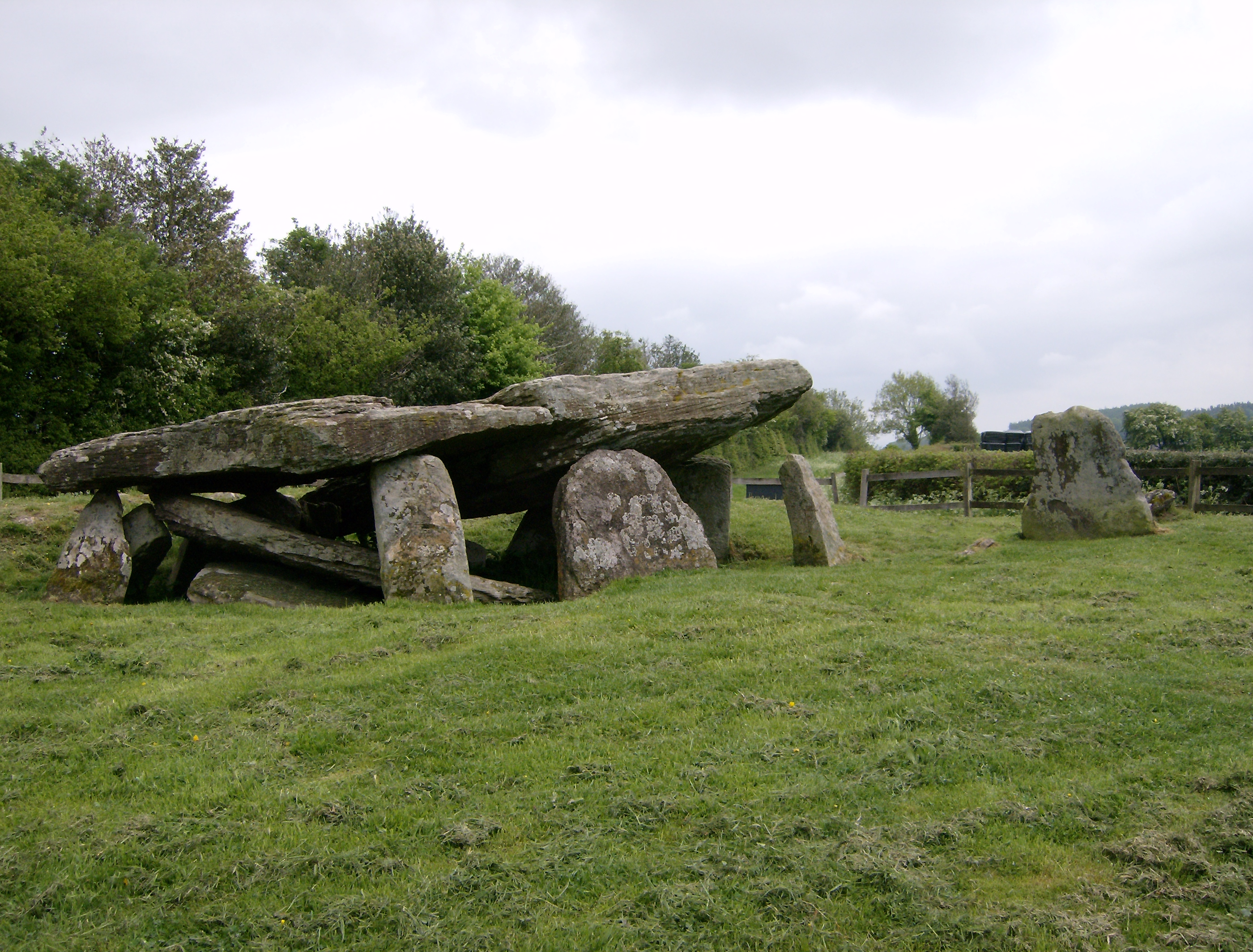
Arthur's Stone, Herefordshire

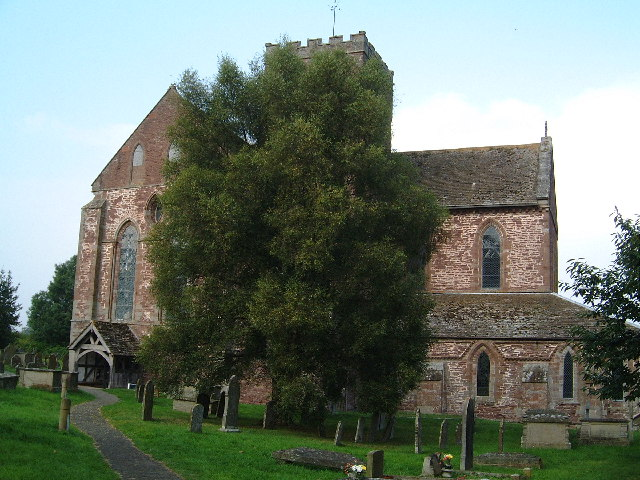
Dore Abbey

Arthur's Stone, Herefordshire, located just outside the village of Dorstone, is a chamber tomb from the Neolithic Period, and dates from some time between 3700 and 2700 BC. Arthur's Stone is Herefordshire's oldest man-made structure.

Dore Abbey is a former mediaeval Cistercian monastery that during the summer offers a programme of musical concerts. It was built between 1175 and 1220 and restored in the 1630s.

Nearby is Bacton Church with the monument to Blanche Parry - she was close to Queen Elizabeth I for 56 years. This monument, securely dated before November 1578, is the earliest depiction anywhere of Queen Elizabeth I as an icon, as 'Gloriana'. It pre-dates the paintings showing this theme. Bacton Church also has rare 1914–1918, World War I, medal ribbons depicted in stone on several memorial wall plaques.

The diaries of Francis Kilvert extol the beauty of the local landscape of English river valleys sheltered by the Black Mountains between Hay on Wye and Hereford and it is Bredwardine where he is buried. Kilvert was Rector at St Andrew's church, Bredwardine until his early death in 1879.

Snodhill Castle is a very early Norman stone fortification. Ewyas Harold Castle is an early Norman motte and bailey castle and St Michael's church, Ewyas Harold contains a 13th-century or 14th-century effigy of a lady holding a heart in the palm of her hand.

The last remaining toll bridge in Herefordshire at Whitney-on-Wye leads to Hay-on-Wye.

A plaque written in Welsh and dated 1574 was discovered during renovations in St Margaret's Church, near Newton, and is currently on display within the church. The church also contains a printed notice of the duties of churchwardens in both English and Welsh.

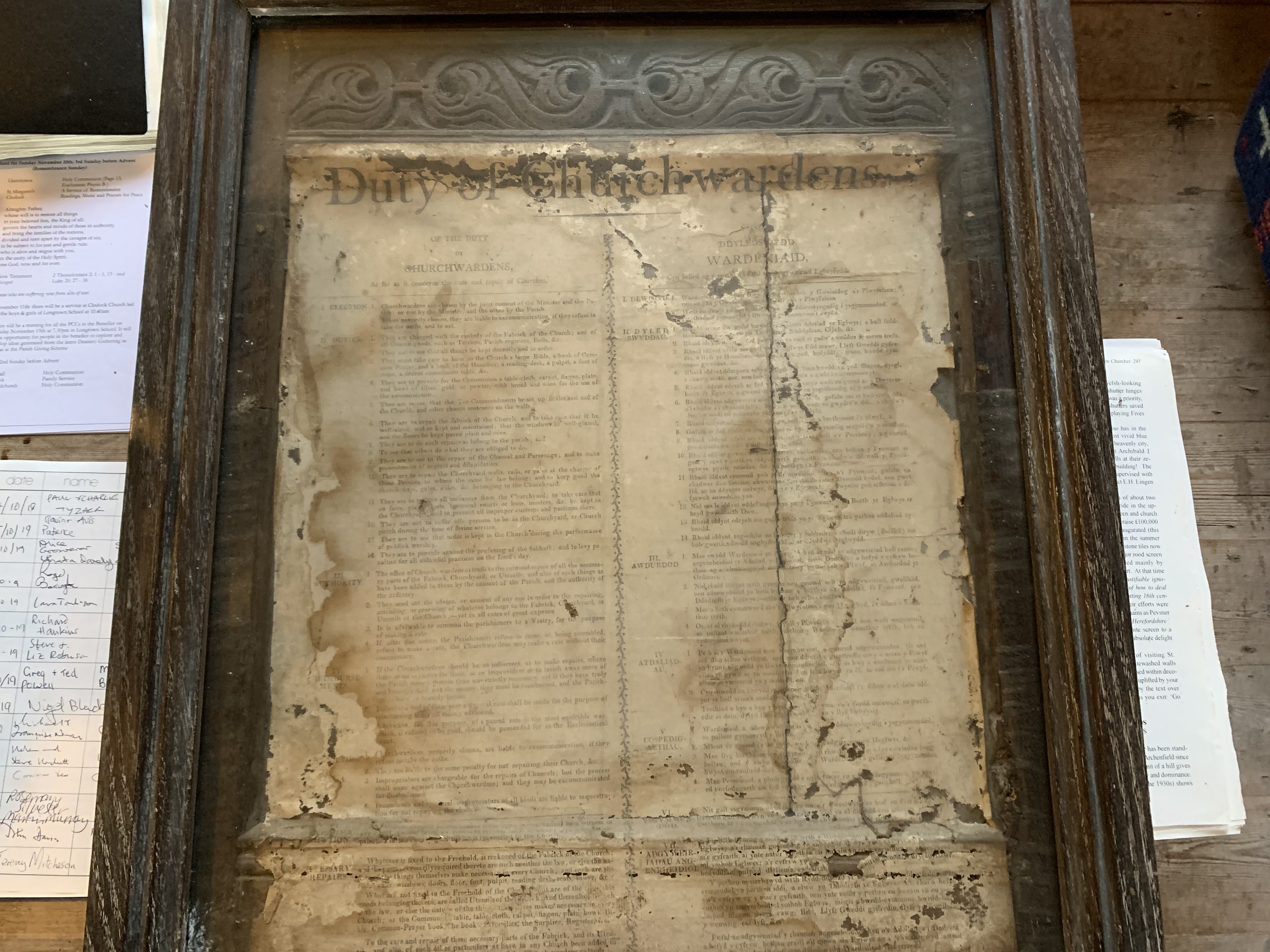
Notice of duties of Churchwardens in English and Welsh, in St Margaret's Church, Herefordshire

Owain Glyndŵr is said to have spent his final years after his disappearance following the eventual failure of his rebellion against King Henry IV in hiding under an alternative identity with his daughter, Alys Scudamore, previously known as Alys ferch Owain Glyndŵr, and her husband, a Herefordshire Scudamore, namely Sir John Scudamore in the Golden Valley.

The Golden Valley featured in the 1993 film Shadowlands in both a painting and as an actual location. C.S. Lewis, the film's protagonist, owned a painting of a valley which to him, as a child, appeared to be heaven.

The 154 miles (248 km) Herefordshire Trail long distance footpath passes through the valley.

== Railway ==
The Golden Valley Railway Company opened a line from Pontrilas to Dorstone in 1881 and an extension to Hay-on-Wye in 1889, but a plan to link to Monmouth was never realised. The line was sold to the Great Western Railway in 1899. Passenger operation on the line ceased in 1941 and it closed completely in 1957.

== Pipeline ==
During 2008 the Golden Valley saw the construction of the National Grid's 196 km natural gas pipeline from Felindre in Swansea to Tirley in Gloucestershire. The pipeline increases the volume of gas which can be transported from the new LNG terminals at Milford Haven to the rest of the UK.
