= Ewyas Harold =

Village in Herefordshire, England

Coordinates: 51.953°N 2.891°W

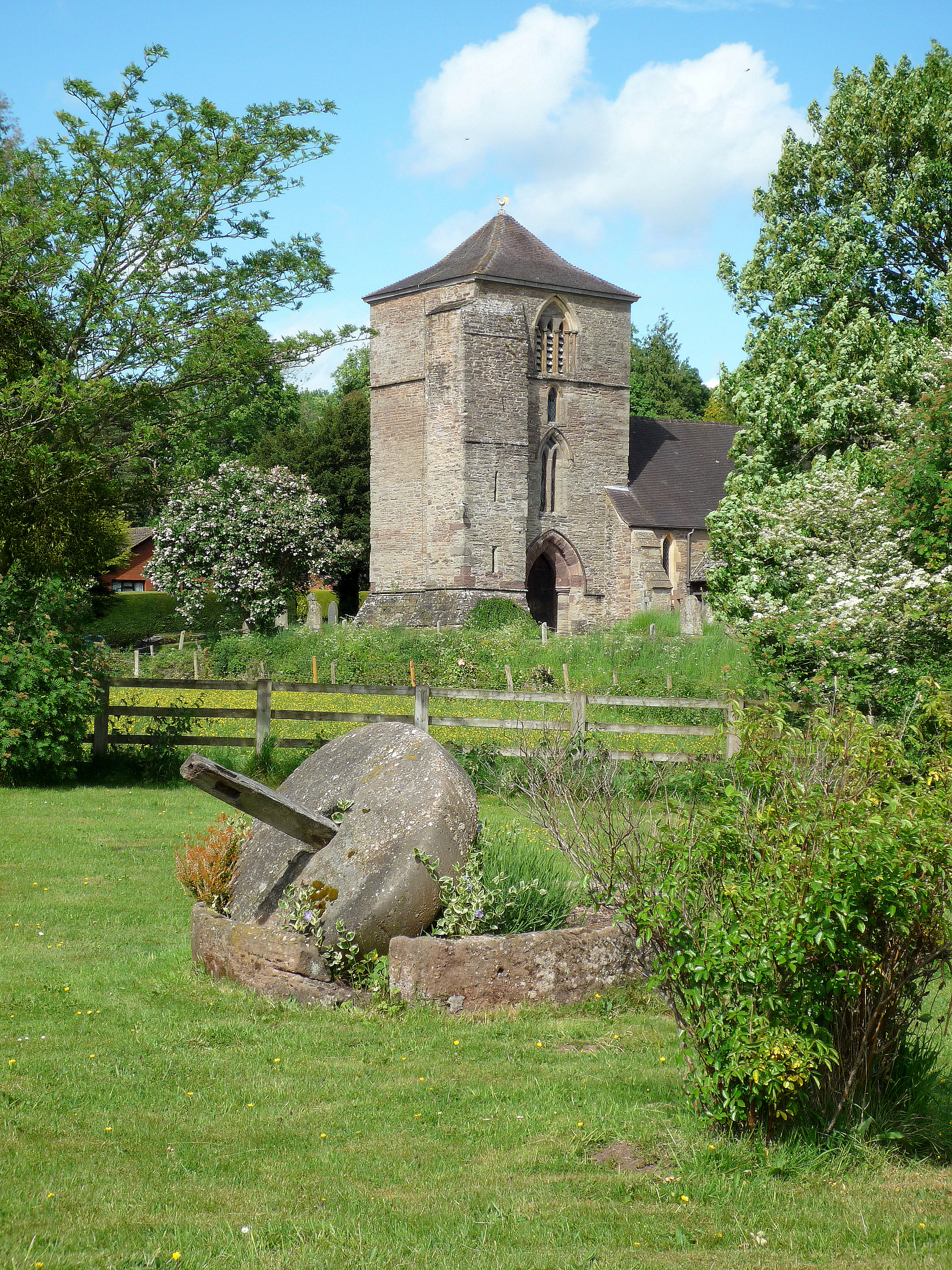
- St. Michael and All Angels Church

- Location within Herefordshire
- Population: 883 (2011 Census)
- District: Herefordshire
- Shire county: Herefordshire
- Region: West Midlands
- Country: England
- Sovereign state: United Kingdom
- Post town: Hereford
- Postcode district: HR2
- Police: West Mercia
- Fire: Hereford and Worcester
- Ambulance: West Midlands
- UK Parliament: Hereford and South Herefordshire

Ewyas Harold (/ˈjuəs ˈhærəld/) is a village and civil parish in the Golden Valley in Herefordshire, England, near the Wales-England border about halfway between Abergavenny, Monmouthshire, and Hereford. The population of this civil parish at the 2011 census was 883. It lies on the Dulas brook, and is contiguous with the neighbouring village of Pontrilas.

The village is on the site of Ewyas Harold Castle, of which only the motte remains. Its name derives from the Welsh kingdom of Ewyas and from Harold, son of Ralph the Timid (Earl of Hereford), and great-grandson of King Æthelred the Unready.

Ewyas Harold parish has a large area of common land rich in wildlife and ancient meadow saffron, a leftover from cultivation by the monks at Dore Abbey. Some villagers have commoner's rights.

The village has a school, a Baptist chapel, a fire station and a redundant Catholic church. The Church of England ministry of St. Michael and All Angels is now linked with that of several neighbouring parishes. It is the nearest village to the Pontrilas Army Training Area.
