= Vowchurch =

Village in Herefordshire, England

Coordinates: 52.023°N 2.933°W

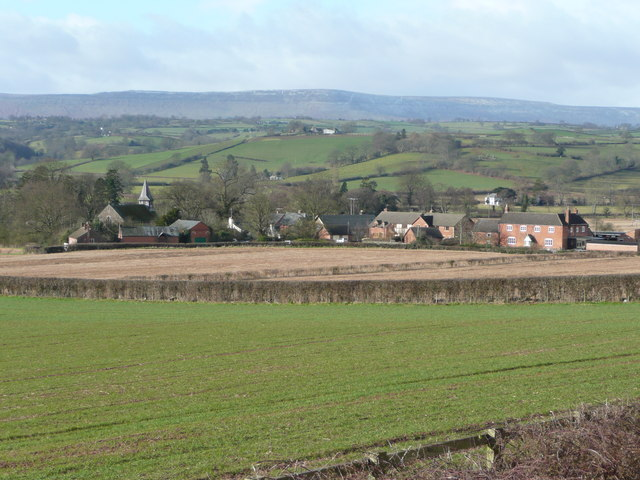
- Vowchurch

- Location within Herefordshire
- Population: 176
- OS grid reference: SO3636
- Unitary authority: Herefordshire
- Ceremonial county: Herefordshire
- Region: West Midlands
- Country: England
- Sovereign state: United Kingdom
- Post town: HEREFORD
- Postcode district: HR2
- Dialling code: 01981
- Police: West Mercia
- Fire: Hereford and Worcester
- Ambulance: West Midlands
- UK Parliament: Hereford & South Herefordshire

Vowchurch is a village and civil parish in Herefordshire, England, situated in the Golden Valley, on the River Dore. The village is about 10 miles (16 km) southwest of Hereford. According to the 2001 census, the parish had a population of 163, increasing to 176 according to the 2011 census.

The place-name 'Vowchurch' is first attested in the Taxatio Ecclesiastica of 1291, where it appears as Fowchirche. The name means 'multi-coloured church', from the Old English fāg meaning 'multi-coloured'. The same derivation is found in Frome Vauchurch in Dorset.

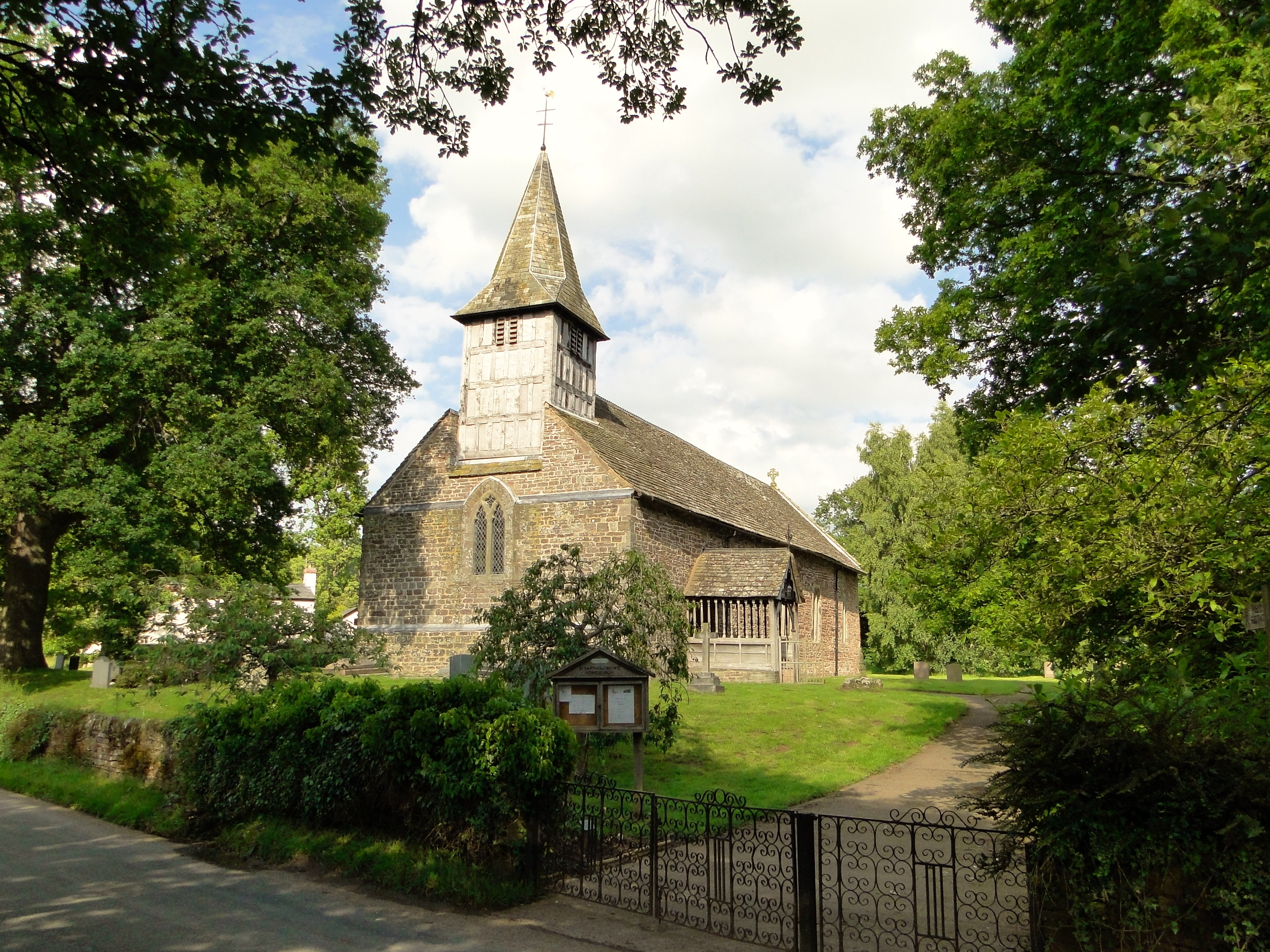
St Bartholomew's

The Grade I listed parish church of St Bartholomew serves a large ecclesiastical parish.

The village was served by Vowchurch railway station from 1881 to 1949.
