= Dorstone =

Village in Herefordshire, England

Coordinates: 52.0703°N 3.0016°W

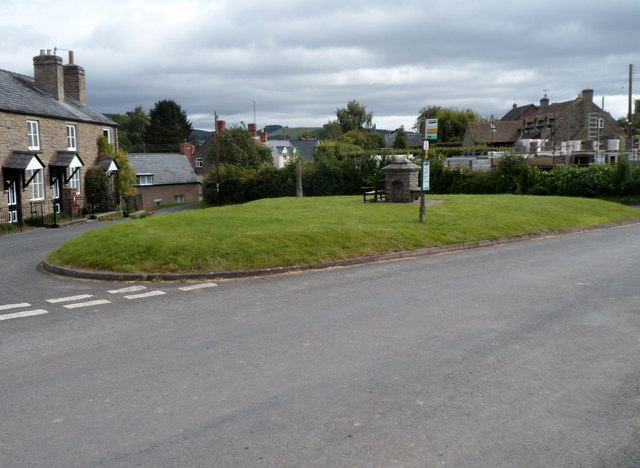
- The village green, Dorstone

- Location within Herefordshire
- Population: 401 (2011)
- OS grid reference: SO313418
- Civil parish: Dorstone
- Unitary authority: Herefordshire
- Ceremonial county: Herefordshire
- Region: West Midlands
- Country: England
- Sovereign state: United Kingdom
- Post town: HEREFORD
- Postcode district: HR3
- Dialling code: 01981
- Police: West Mercia
- Fire: Hereford and Worcester
- Ambulance: West Midlands
- UK Parliament: Hereford and South Herefordshire

Dorstone is a village and civil parish within the Golden Valley, Herefordshire, England. There is a church and public house with restaurant. The Golden Valley area offers hillwalking and horseback riding countryside and is noted for its scenery. It is within the catchment area of Fairfield secondary school. In 2011 the parish had a population of 401.

Dorstone was once the location of Dorstone Castle. A mile to the south the fragmentary remains of Snodhill Castle can still be seen. From 2014 to 2018, the Historic Buildings and Monuments Commission for England (Historic England) put £150,000 into scientific and historical study of the Snodhill Castle site, plus an additional £500,000 grant to the Snodhill Castle Preservation Trust to complete clearing and restoration of the remains of Snodhill Castle, with the site opening to the public as of May 2018.

St. Faith's parish church in Dorstone was reputedly built by Richard de Brito, one of the knights who murdered Thomas Becket, as penance for the murder. He also built the Pandy Inn in Dorstone to house the workmen who built the church. During Victorian era rebuilding of the church in the 1890s a tomb to another de Brito was found which contained a pewter chalice. This was housed in the church for many years, but was stolen in 2006.

The Dorstone History Society seeks to study the church and the village – which stretches back to Neolithic times as suggested by the local Arthur's Stone, an ancient monument. This is said to be the spot where King Arthur slew a giant who left the impression of his elbows on one of the stones as he fell.

An annual sloe gin competition is held in Dorstone. Each year the winner is crowned the "Grand Master of the Sloes".

== Railway ==
The Golden Valley Railway branch line to Hay-on-Wye was opened on 1 September 1881 as far as Dorstone and later extended to Hay-on-Wye. The new line involved considerable additions to the track layout and buildings where it joined an existing line at the junction station of Pontrilas.

The last passenger train from Dorstone was on 23 August 1951.

== Gallery ==
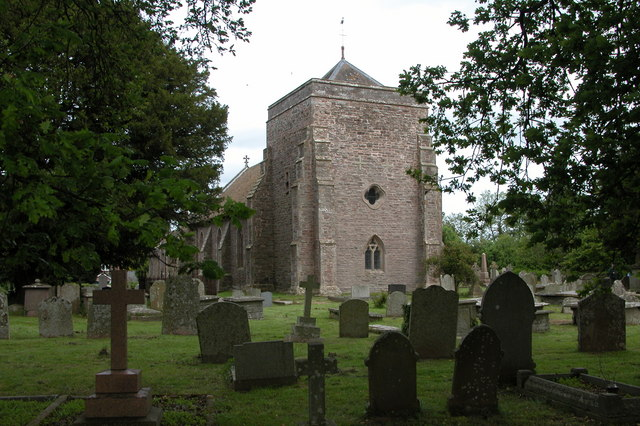
Dorstone Church

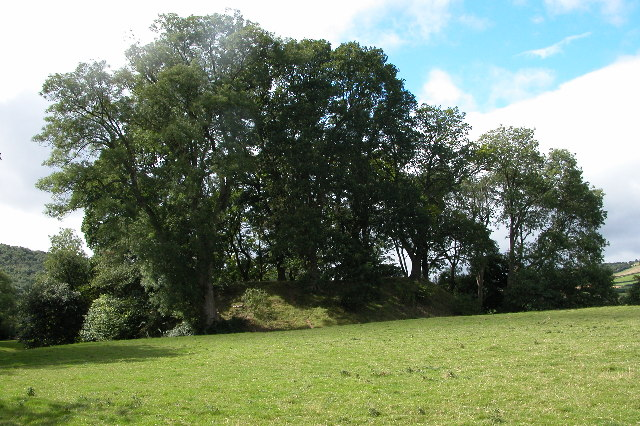
This impressive motte and bailey is thought to date from 11th to 12th centuries

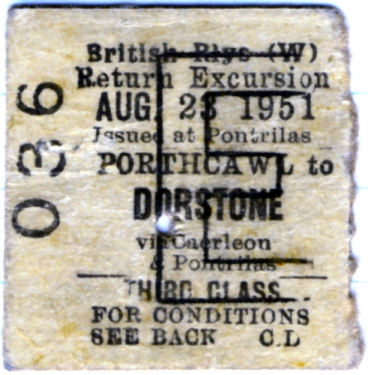
One of the last original tickets railway tickets
