= Peterchurch =

Village in Herefordshire, England

Coordinates: 52.043°N 2.955°W

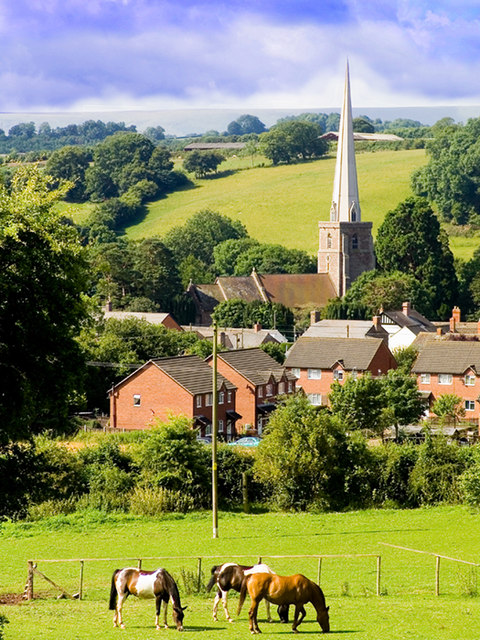
- Peterchurch village, with St Peter's church

- Location within Herefordshire
- Population: 1,091 (2011 Census)
- Unitary authority: Herefordshire
- Shire county: Herefordshire
- Region: West Midlands
- Country: England
- Sovereign state: United Kingdom
- Post town: Hereford
- Postcode district: HR2
- Police: West Mercia
- Fire: Hereford and Worcester
- Ambulance: West Midlands
- UK Parliament: Hereford and South Herefordshire

Peterchurch is a village and civil parish in the Golden Valley, Herefordshire, England. The countryside features extensive views of the Black Mountains but the village itself is architecturally undistinguished. It was known for the award-winning 'church reordering' scheme within the Norman church, carried out in 2012 by the Herefordshire-based architects Communion Design.

== Population ==
In 1848, the population was recorded to be 745. The population of the civil parish at the 2011 census was 1,091.

== Church ==
The Norman church, dedicated to St. Peter, was built based on the unusual basilica model having four chambers. The church's foundations were traced back to 786, and parts of the Saxon walls can still be seen in the sanctuary. The original stone altar is in place, which was built dating back before the Reformation.

The original church spire was removed in about 1950. The modern spire is made of fibreglass and was installed in 1972. It was for a time, the tallest fibreglass spire in the country.

Robert Jones, recipient of the Victoria Cross for his role at Rorke's Drift, is buried in St Peter's Churchyard.

== Railways ==
The village was formerly served by a station on the Golden Valley Railway from 1881 until its closure in the 1950s.

== Well ==
The well called St. Peter's Well, was prominent to have curative properties with respect to diseases of the eye.

== See also ==
- Fairfield High School, Peterchurch
