= Pontrilas =

Village in Herefordshire, England

Coordinates: 51.94271°N 2.88009°W

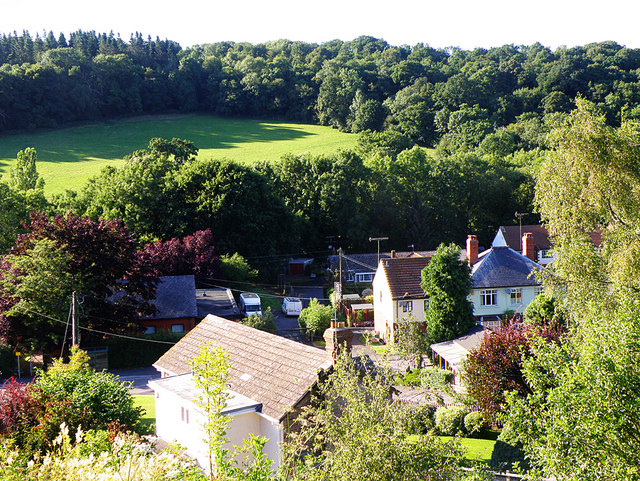
- Looking over Pontrilas to Callow Hill Wood

- Location within Herefordshire
- Civil parish: Kentchurch
- Unitary authority: Herefordshire
- Shire county: Herefordshire
- Region: West Midlands
- Country: England
- Sovereign state: United Kingdom
- Post town: Hereford
- Postcode district: HR2
- Police: West Mercia
- Fire: Hereford and Worcester
- Ambulance: West Midlands
- UK Parliament: Hereford and South Herefordshire

Pontrilas (English: Bridge over Three Rivers) is a village in south Herefordshire, England, half a mile from the border with Wales. It is in the parish of Kentchurch and lies midway between Hereford and Abergavenny. In 2011 the main village contained 66 residential dwellings, as well as Pontrilas Business Park.

The village name comes from the Welsh language, and means 'bridge over three rivers' due to the River Dore, Dulas brook and another smaller stream (which descends via Dineterwood but appears to have no specific name) meeting there. The main A465 road skirts the west of the village.

The neighbouring villages include; Ewyas Harold, Llangua, Dulas, Wormbridge, Kilpeck, Bagwyllydiart, Abbey Dore and Howton.

== History ==
There has been a settlement in the area since at least 1086 when the hamlet was called Elwistone, possibly originating from the Welsh names Elwin or Helys. Over the centuries there have been several variations of name e.g. Ailstone and Heliston. The latter being the name of a terrace of houses in the modern day village.

The name Pontrilas originally only belonged to the manor house Pontrilas Court, once one of the homes of the Baskerville family, which sits beside the bridge over the River Dore, near where it meets the Dulas brook and another smaller stream. From 1750 the hamlet was also marked as Pontrilas on maps.

The Newport, Abergavenny and Hereford Railway line came to Pontrilas in 1854. The line was sponsored by the London North Western Railway and merger with other lines took place in 1860 with the West Midland Railway which itself was taken over to eventually result in the Great Western Railway (GWR) running the line from 1863. A local company constructed the Golden Valley Railway line in 1881 and the hamlet grew in importance. However the line was not a financial success and it closed in 1898. It was subsequently purchased and reopened in 1901 by the GWR.

The village had a cattle market and a pub, The Pontrilas Inn built by the Scudamore family, who still own much land in the area. The pub was burned down in the 1970s. There was also a chemical factory owned by Wrekin Chemical Company beside the main railway line to the north of the village.

Since the closing of the station in 1958 the village has declined in importance, though it does still boast an auction room and a number of businesses including Pontrilas Timber which has been there since 1947, an estate agency and a number of other smaller businesses. The former World War II Elm Bridge munitions depot is now the site of the Qinetiq managed Pontrilas Army Training Area.

== Transport ==
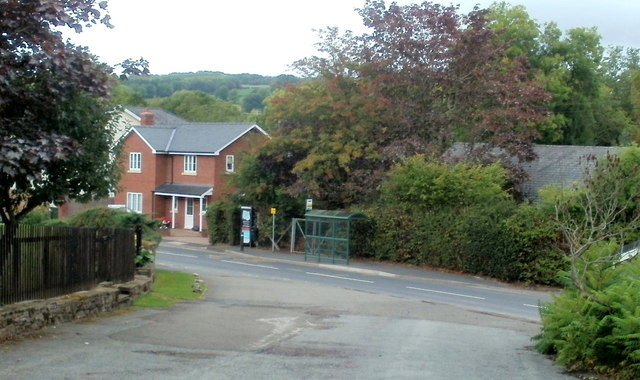
Pontrilas bus shelter

Pontrilas is served by Stagecoach South Wales service X4 which runs between Hereford and Cardiff and National Express Coaches service 321 which links Aberdare and Bradford

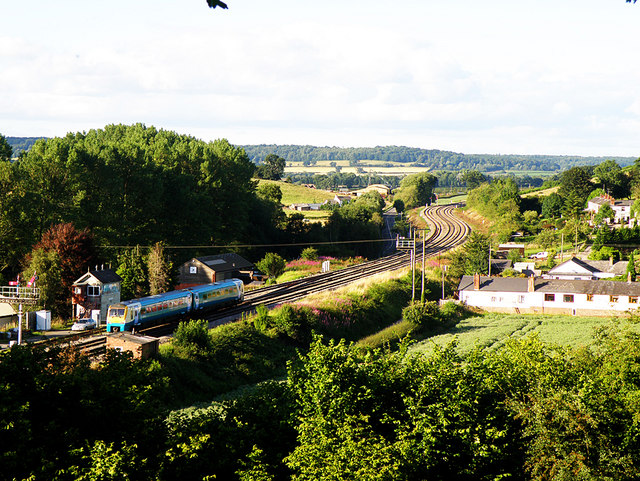
Railway at Pontrilas

Pontrilas railway station is currently closed but has the potential to be re-opened with services calling for passengers on the Welsh Marches Line.
