= Golden Valley Railway =

Former line in Herefordshire, England

The Golden Valley Railway was a railway company which constructed a branch line from Pontrilas in Herefordshire, England, to Hay on Wye. Pontrilas was on the Great Western Railway main line between Newport and Hereford. The Golden Valley Railway Company opened the first part of its line from Pontrilas to Dorstone in 1881. It was constantly beset with shortage of money, but opened an extension to Hay in 1889. Its directors had grand ideas of extending further to Monmouth and forming part of a long-distance trunk route. It issued misleading promotional material which secured significant investment from the public, but exposure of the falsehoods resulted in collapse.

The line closed in 1898, and the company sold its undertaking to the Great Western Railway in 1899 for £11,000; the capital expended on the line had already amounted to £334,786.

Passenger operation on the line ceased in 1941 and it closed permanently in 1957.

== First railways to Hay ==
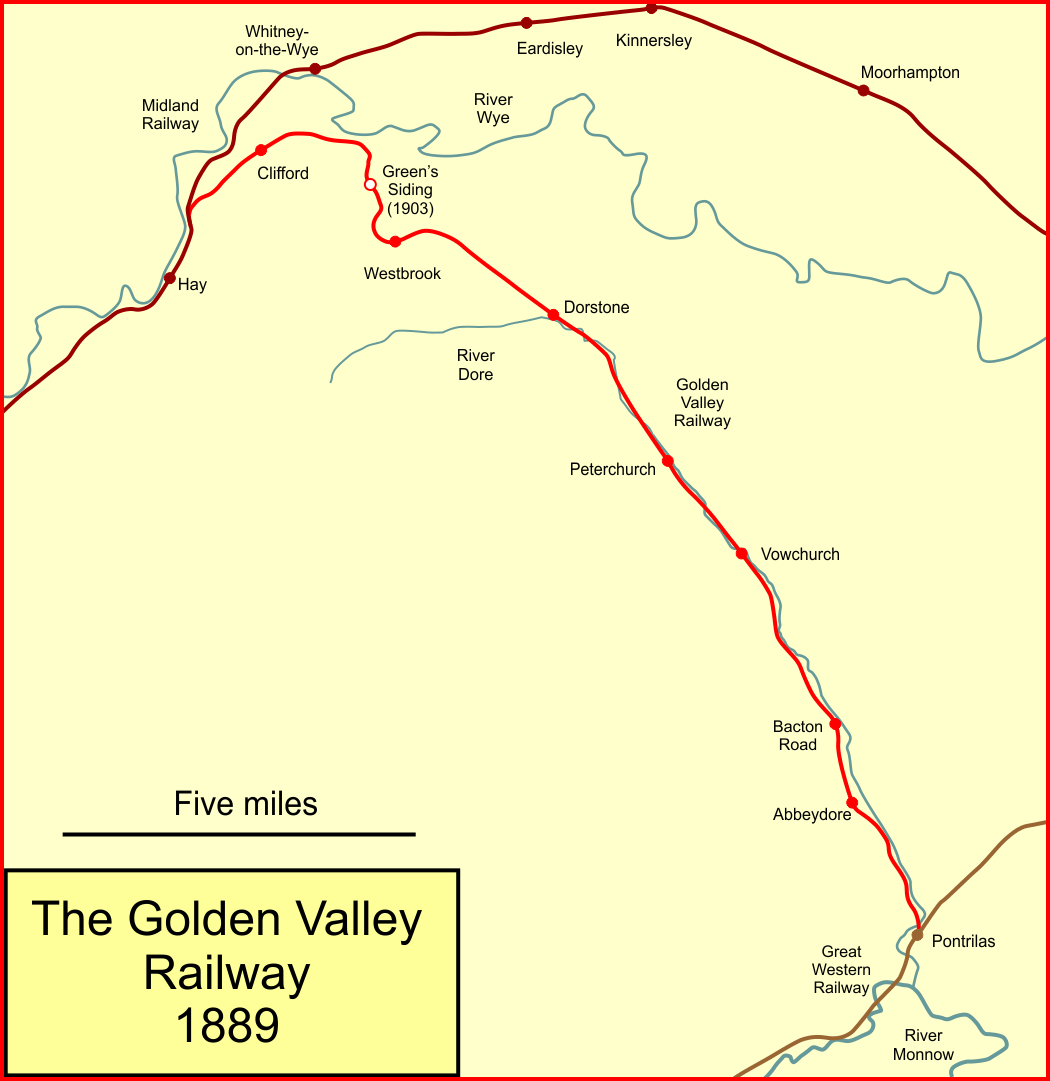
The Golden Valley Railway in 1889

Hay, later renamed Hay on Wye, was connected to the canal network in 1816 when the Hay Railway opened. It was a 3 ft 6 in gauge plateway, reliant on horse traction. It ran to Watton, where there was a wharf on the Brecknock and Abergavenny Canal. Although this considerably improved communications to and from Hay, the advance of railway technology eventually left the Hay Railway behind, and in 1859 the Hereford, Hay and Brecon Railway (HH&BR) was authorised. It agreed a purchase of the Hay Railway in order to convert it to an edge railway with locomotive traction. The proposal was ratified by the Hay Railway Act 1860 (23 & 24 Vict. c. clxxix) of 6 August 1860. The HH&BR opened its line to Hay in 1864. The HH&BR was later taken over by the Midland Railway.

== First part authorised ==
Golden Valley Railway Act 1876
- Act of Parliament
- Parliament of the United Kingdom
- Long title: An Act to Incorporate a Company for making a Railway in the County of Hereford from the Great Western Railway at Pontrilas to Dorstone, and for other purposes.
- Citation: 39 & 40 Vict. c. cxli

Dates
- Royal assent: 13 July 1876

In 1875 a body of opinion locally held that a railway to Hay from Pontrilas, or thereabouts, was feasible. Richard Dansey Green-Price was prominent in furthering the scheme, and although there were some who were sceptical, he managed to get significant local support. At public meetings optimistic assertions about traffic receipts were made, and the line would, it was claimed, be extended to Monmouth and become the focus of local commerce. Construction of the line was evidently viable, and a bill to authorise it was presented in the 1876 session of Parliament. Initial opposition was later withdrawn, and the Golden Valley Railway Act 1876 (39 & 40 Vict. c. cxli) received royal assent on 13 July 1876. However this was only to build from Pontrilas to Dorstone. The railway would be 10 miles in length from a junction with the Great Western Railway (GWR) line at Pontrilas where there would be running powers into the GWR station. Authorised capital was to be £60,000.

A tender for construction of the line in the amount of £41,964 was accepted from Scott and Edwards, at the first board meeting on 9 August 1876. The first sod was cut on 31 August 1876.

== Extending to Hay ==
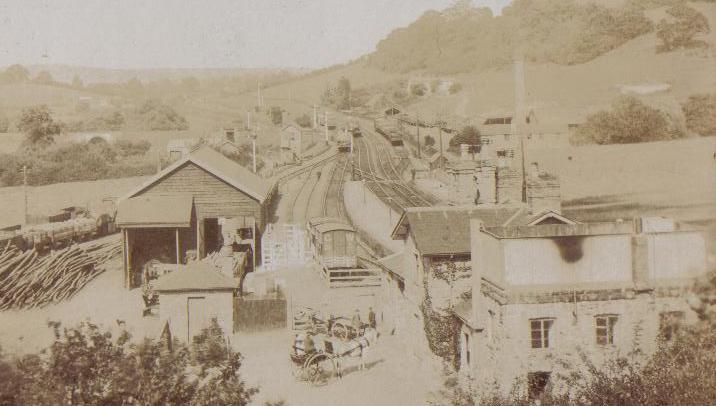
Pontrilas station in 1906, looking north. The Golden Valley line bay platform is on the left

Commercial interests in Hay were dismayed that Dorstone was to be the terminus of the line; Hay, they argued, had always been the market centre for Dorstone. At a board meeting on 25 October 1876 the directors undertook to promote a bill for an extension from Dorstone to Hay, provided local people would subscribe for £10,000 of shares. A route was planned and on 7 February 1877 a shareholders' meeting approved the intended bill; the route was to lead to an independent station at Hay, some distance from the existing HH&BR station. Thoughts of the Golden Valley line becoming part of a through route were in doubt if the railways were not to link up.

Golden Valley Railway (Extension to Hay) Act 1877
- Act of Parliament
- Parliament of the United Kingdom
- Long title: An Act to authorise the Golden Valley Railway Company to extend their Railway to Hay; and for other purposes.
- Citation: 40 & 41 Vict. c. clxxvii

Dates
- Royal assent: 2 August 1877

Text of statute as originally enacted

The Golden Valley Railway (Extension to Hay) Act 1877 (40 & 41 Vict. c. clxxvii) was passed in August 1877; additional capital of £72,000 was authorised.

== Construction and first opening ==
The work of construction proceeded, but the company quickly overspent its available funds, and the Hay extension was not started. Debenture loans were taken out at 6%; this proved an expensive way of funding the work. The board had been confident of being able to open the Dorstone section on 1 August 1880, but this was quickly seen to be impossible as the construction work was inadequate. Some directors made personal payments to enable continuation of the construction work. At length on 4 August 1881 Colonel Rich of the Board of Trade inspected the line for passenger operation and approved it. The line opened as far as Dorstone on 1 September 1881; the line was worked by the company itself with an engine hired from the Great Western Railway (GWR). £67,083 had been expended so far, and directors gave personal guarantees to the GWR regarding payment of the locomotive hire charges. There were three round trips daily, with an extra trip for a time on Tuesdays, Wednesdays and Saturdays.

Discussions with the GWR about working the line had taken place; it was a commonplace arrangement for a larger company to work small local lines, but the Golden Valley Railway Company had refused to accept the terms the GWR offered. The Golden Valley trains used a bay platform at Pontrilas, but a through running junction was installed, and general improvements to Pontrilas station costing £4,054 were made, a proportion of that cost falling to the Golden Valley company.

The company had acquired two passenger coaches from the Oldbury Carriage Company. By November 1882 the Oldbury company was suing for payment, which evidently the Golden Valley had not made. In 1885 the issue must have been dragging on, for the company offered to sell the carriages back to the Oldbury company, and to give debentures, that is, promises only, for the sums owing. The Golden Valley never owned goods rolling stock, except a brake van.

The Great Western Railway had not been receiving the charges due to it for engine power, and on 20 October 1883 it withdrew its engine. For some weeks no trains ran on the line, but a group of shareholders purchased a second hand engine from the London and North Western Railway for £700 and hired it to the company for £52 10s a half year; the company now provided its own driver and fireman.

Clearly the line was not paying; for the first full half year (January to June 1882) receipts were £667 11s 7d and operational expenses including engine hire were £857 12s 3d. Obviously no surplus was available for interest on debentures.

== A second attempt to extend to Hay ==
Golden Valley Railway (Hay Extension) Act 1884
- Act of Parliament
- Parliament of the United Kingdom
- Long title: An Act to enable the Golden Valley Railway Company to abandon a portion of their authorised Railway; to construct new Railways; and for other purposes.
- Citation: 47 & 48 Vict. c. cclii

Dates
- Royal assent: 14 August 1884

Text of statute as originally enacted

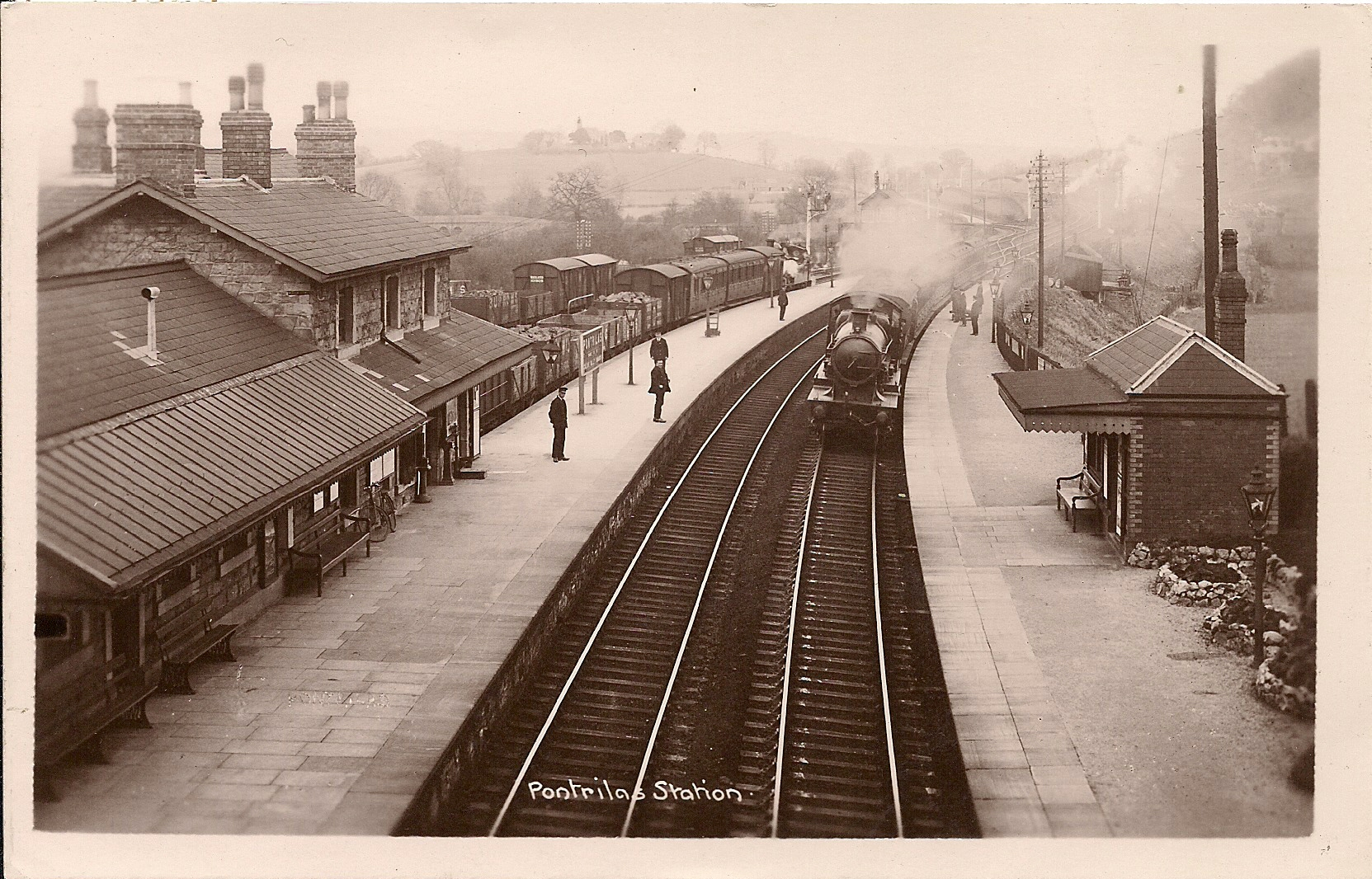
Pontrilas station; a Golden Valley mixed train is in the bay platform

In 1884 a new bill was submitted proposing the extension to Hay. This time a different route was planned, which would join the Midland Railway there and use its station. The Golden Valley Railway (Hay Extension) Act 1884 (47 & 48 Vict. c. cclii) was passed and it gave authority for an additional £45,000 of share capital.

The railways hereinafter referred to and authorized by this Act are wholly situate in the county of Hereford:

- A railway (No. 1) five miles seven furlongs seven chains in length commencing in the parish of Clifford by a junction with the railway authorized by the Act of 1877 at or near the point which on the plans deposited for and referred to in that Act indicates the distance of two miles from the commencement of the said authorized railway and terminating in the parish of Cusop in the field marked No. 3 on the tithe commutation map of that parish:
- A railway (No. 2) eight chains in length commencing in the parish of Cusop by a junction with railway (No. 1) in the field marked No. 1 on the tithe commutation map of that parish and terminating in the said parish by a junction with the Hereford Hay and Brecon Railway of the Midland Railway Company.

— Section 7, Golden Valley Railway (Hay Extension) Act 1884 (47 & 48 Vict. c. cclii)

At the same time a running skirmish was being pursued with the GWR over the working of the line. The Golden Valley was being somewhat aggressive in its approach while trying to coerce the GWR to take on a commercially challenging task. By 1884 the GWR agreed to work the line, taking the whole of the meagre income if the Golden Valley would bring the permanent way into fair condition. This would incur expenditure of moneys that the Golden Valley did not have. The GWR advanced further and undertook to work the line, taking all the receipts and liabilities for a period, and then taking 90% of receipts. As the company was certainly heavily indebted and loss-making, this was not unreasonable, but Green-Price, as a dominant shareholder, urged rejection of the deal, promising that completion to Hay and reconditioning of the existing track would enable the line to "form part of the shortest route between Bristol and Mid Wales and North Wales; such a line... would not only pay interest on the debentures but provide a fair dividend for the preferred and ordinary shareholders."

Green-Price was successful in his view, resulting in the resignation of the chairman, Gavin Robinson and several other directors; Green-Price took over the chairmanship.

On 29 June 1885 it was announced that the train service would be temporarily suspended from 2 July, for the purpose of re-sleepering the track, though a goods train was worked four days a week. The line was re-opened on 19 August. C. L. Mowat is sceptical about the real purpose of the line closure: "The real reason seems to have been the wish to substitute a train belonging to the Company for that hired from the Great Western, but it is not clear what coaches were used when the line was reopened."

Green-Price attended the Great Western Board on 6 August 1885; by that time the company owed the GWR £1,318. He promised that he and Robinson would liquidate the portion of the debt guaranteed by them within three months if the Great Western allowed the Golden Valley trains to continue to run into Pontrilas. Evidently the GWR had threatened refusal of that facility; moreover it was the personal guarantees that would be liquidated, not the Golden Valley's own indebtedness. In fact the money was not paid, and the GWR had to wait until 1888 for it.

Green-Price now concentrated on raising money for the extension to Hay. This was done by a series of artful prospectuses and other devices intended to mislead the unwary; in addition the directors continued to fund the company by, for example, purchasing shares at a discount and giving them back to the company to re-issue. The contractor Chambers took a considerable proportion of his fees in shares and debentures, in effect financing the work himself.

Arrangements were agreed with the Midland Railway to use their Hay station and to form a connecting junction there, and Dorstone station had to be made suitable for crossing trains there.

Colonel Rich of the Board of Trade inspected the extension on 9 December 1888 for passenger operation, but declined to authorise it as the trackbed was not well consolidated and the recent heavy rains had affected it badly. Rich made a second visit three months later and found the line not much improved, and the sought-for approval was still withheld.

In order to generate some revenue, the company opened the line to goods traffic (which did not require Board of Trade approval) on 21 April 1889, and Rich approved the line on his third visit on 15 May. The Hay extension line opened for passenger business on 27 May 1889. (Note: Oppitz states that the line opened on 15 May, but this is a mistake for the approval for opening.) The capital expended in building 18 miles of railway had been £336,000.

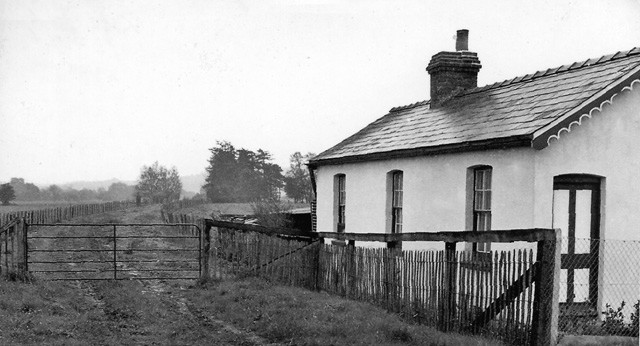
The former Bacton station after closure of the line

The stations on the first section were at Abbeydore, Vowchurch, Peterchurch and Dorstone, and trains stopped at the level crossing at Bacton Road. (Note: A station was opened in GWR days at Bacton.) When the line was extended to Hay, stations were at Westbrook, Green's Siding and Clifford, ending at the Midland station at Hay. Dorstone was the only crossing place on the single line, although after some time it became unusual to cross trains there and the whole line was worked as a single section.

Four engines were in use from 1889, all of them obtained second hand by Chambers, the contractor.

== Proposed extension to Monmouth ==
Golden Valley Extension Railway Act 1889
- Act of Parliament
- Parliament of the United Kingdom
- Long title: An Act to enable the Golden Valley Railway Company to make New Railways and for other purposes.
- Citation: 52 & 53 Vict. c. cxcv

Dates
- Royal assent: 26 August 1889

Text of statute as originally enacted

During the building of the Hay extension, Green-Price was already planning a further extension to Monmouth. He and other directors were convinced that this would be the salvation of the company by becoming part of a through route from Bristol to the North West of England. It was possible to draw such a route on a map, and ignore the difficulty of the tortuous curves and steep gradients on the single line of the Golden Valley, and the superior alignments of competing lines. A bill for the Monmouth extension failed in the 1888 session of Parliament, but in 1889 a further attempt was made, and on 26 August 1889 the Golden Valley Extension Railway Act 1889 (52 & 53 Vict. c. cxcv) was passed. A railway from Pontrilas to Monmouth, May Hill, could be built; the capital would be £189,000.

The railways hereinbefore referred to and authorised by this Act are:—

- Railway (No. 1) a railway (12 miles 2 furlongs 1·50 chains or thereabouts in length) commencing by a junction with the Hereford Abergavenny and Newport Railway of the Great Western Railway Company in the parish of Ewyas Harold in the county of Hereford and terminating in the parish of Monmouth in the county of Monmouth in a field numbered 430 upon the
  1
  2500
  scale Ordnance map for that parish.
- Railway (No. 2) a railway (6 furlongs 9·90 chains or thereabouts in length) commencing by a junction with the said railway No. 1 near the termination thereof as above described and terminating in the parish of Dixton or Dixton Newton in the county of Monmouth by a junction with the Ross and Monmouth Railway near the northern end of the platform of May Hill Station.
- Railway (No. 3) a railway (1 furlong 7·80 chains or thereabouts in length) wholly situate in the said parish of Dixton or Dixton Newton commencing by a junction with the Ross and Monmouth Railway near the southern end of the platform at May Hill Station and terminating in a field numbered upon the
  1
  2500
  scale Ordnance map 142 in that parish.

— Section 5, Golden Valley Extension Railway Act 1889 (52 & 53 Vict. c. cxcv)

== Operations and cash flow ==
An ambitious train service was attempted from the outset but this was soon reduced, and four round trips by mixed trains took place with two short workings.

In 1890 the company's income was inadequate to pay the wages of the staff on a number of occasions. The company was taking £2 6s per mile in 1888 and the prospectus for the Monmouth extension was ambitious in disregard of that reality: the company would have to pay a rental of £12,600 annually to the extension: the accounts for the extension and the existing component of the company were to be kept separate. Many investors subscribed for shares in the Monmouth extension, apparently in ignorance of the real financial situation.

The extraordinary effrontery of the share offer suffered an unexpected reverse when a Miss Brown brought a suit against the directors on the grounds that the 1886 prospectus for preference shares was misleading, in that it claimed that shares had been fully paid up, when in fact they had been allocated to Chambers free as if they were fully paid up. Miss Brown's case was confirmed and it seemed likely that other similar suits would quickly follow. The debenture holders held a meeting with the directors and it was made obvious that the company could not simply carry on regardless: the Monmouth extension had to be abandoned forthwith.

Golden Valley Railway Act 1891
- Act of Parliament
- Parliament of the United Kingdom
- Long title: An Act to determine the rights of the Debenture Stockholders of the Golden Valley Railway Company and for other purposes.
- Citation: 54 & 55 Vict. c. clxxxvi

Dates
- Royal assent: 5 August 1891

Text of statute as originally enacted

However the crisis was averted so far as the existing line was concerned, when in 1891 a financial reconstruction was implemented and ratified by the Golden Valley Railway Act 1891 (54 & 55 Vict. c. clxxxvi), which declared that all the debentures were validly issued. But early in 1891 several directors had resigned, including Green-Price, although he nevertheless came to a shareholders' meeting of 22 May 1891, still recommending completion to Monmouth as the means of resolving the company's financial embarrassment. The company continued in a chaotic fashion, with many immediate bills being paid by directors personally.

On 23 August 1897 the line between Dorstone and Hay was closed because of the unsafe condition of the track.

== Sale to the Great Western Railway ==
In 1894 the directors had offered to sell the line to the GWR for £30,000; in the following year an offer of £20,000 was refused. In 1897 this was again reduced, to £10,000. In the 1898 session of Parliament, a bill was entered to approve the sale, but due to technical objections it failed. On 20 April 1898 the line was closed.

A purchase by the GWR was agreed in December 1898 for the sum of £9,000 as well as £2,000 to the contractor Chambers in settlement of money owed to him. This was ratified by the Great Western Railway Act 1899 (62 & 63 Vict. c. clxxxvii), and was effective from 1 July 1899. The issued capital of the company was £334,786. On revenue account £57,906 was owed as arrears of debenture interest and £18,581 was owed to other creditors.

On taking over, the Great Western Railway spent £15,000 in relaying the track and reconditioning the line in other ways, and reopened the railway on 1 May 1901. There were three round trips on the line as well as a short working; the GWR scrapped the locomotives and rolling stock of the Golden Valley and installed their own equipment.

The line continued uneventfully under the GWR, and accounts appear to indicate that the operation was profitable.

After World War I improved road services competed effectively against the railway and during World War II the decision was taken to close the passenger service; this was done on 15 December 1941.

A Ministry of Supply depot was opened at Elm Park, between Pontrilas and Abbeydore, about the same time.

The Hay extension beyond Dorstone was closed completely on 1 January 1950; this was followed by total closure between Abbeydore and Dorstone, which closed on 2 February 1953. The Pontrilas to Abbeydore section closed on 3 June 1957.

== Topography ==
=== Gradients ===
Apart from a short sharp descent from Pontrilas, the line to Dorstone climbed all the way, steepening to 1 in 111 at Dorstone. After that there was a further climb of nearly a mile at 1 in 75. From then the line descended at varying gradients, at a ruling gradient of 1 in 75 except for a very short rise near Clifford.

=== Location list ===
- Pontrilas; GWR station; opened 2 January 1854; closed 9 June 1958;
- Abbeydore; opened 1 September 1881; closed 22 October 1883; reopened 17 November 1883; closed 2 July 1885; reopened 19 August 1885; closed 20 April 1898; reopened 1 May 1901; closed 8 December 1941;
- Bacton; when the line opened trains stopped "at Bacton Road" as a flag station; opened 1 November 1901; closed 8 December 1941;
- Vowchurch; opened 1 September 1881; closed 22 October 1883; reopened 17 November 1883; closed 2 July 1885; reopened 19 August 1885; closed 20 April 1898; reopened 1 May 1901; closed 8 December 1941;
- Peterchurch; opened 1 September 1881; closed 22 October 1883; reopened 17 November 1883; closed 2 July 1885; reopened 19 August 1885; closed 20 April 1898; reopened 1 May 1901; closed 8 December 1941;
- Dorstone; opened 1 September 1881; closed 22 October 1883; reopened 17 November 1883; closed 2 July 1885; reopened 19 August 1885; closed 20 April 1898; reopened 1 May 1901; closed 8 December 1941;
- Westbrook; opened 27 May 1889; closed 23 August 1897; reopened 1 May 1901; closed 8 December 1941;
- Green's Siding; opened by July 1903; closed 8 December 1941;
- Clifford; opened 27 May 1889; closed 23 August 1897; reopened 1 May 1901; closed 8 December 1941;
- Hay Junction; convergence with Midland Railway;
- Hay; Midland Railway station; opened 11 July 1864; renamed Hay on Wye 1955; closed 31 December 1962.
