= Giants (esotericism) =

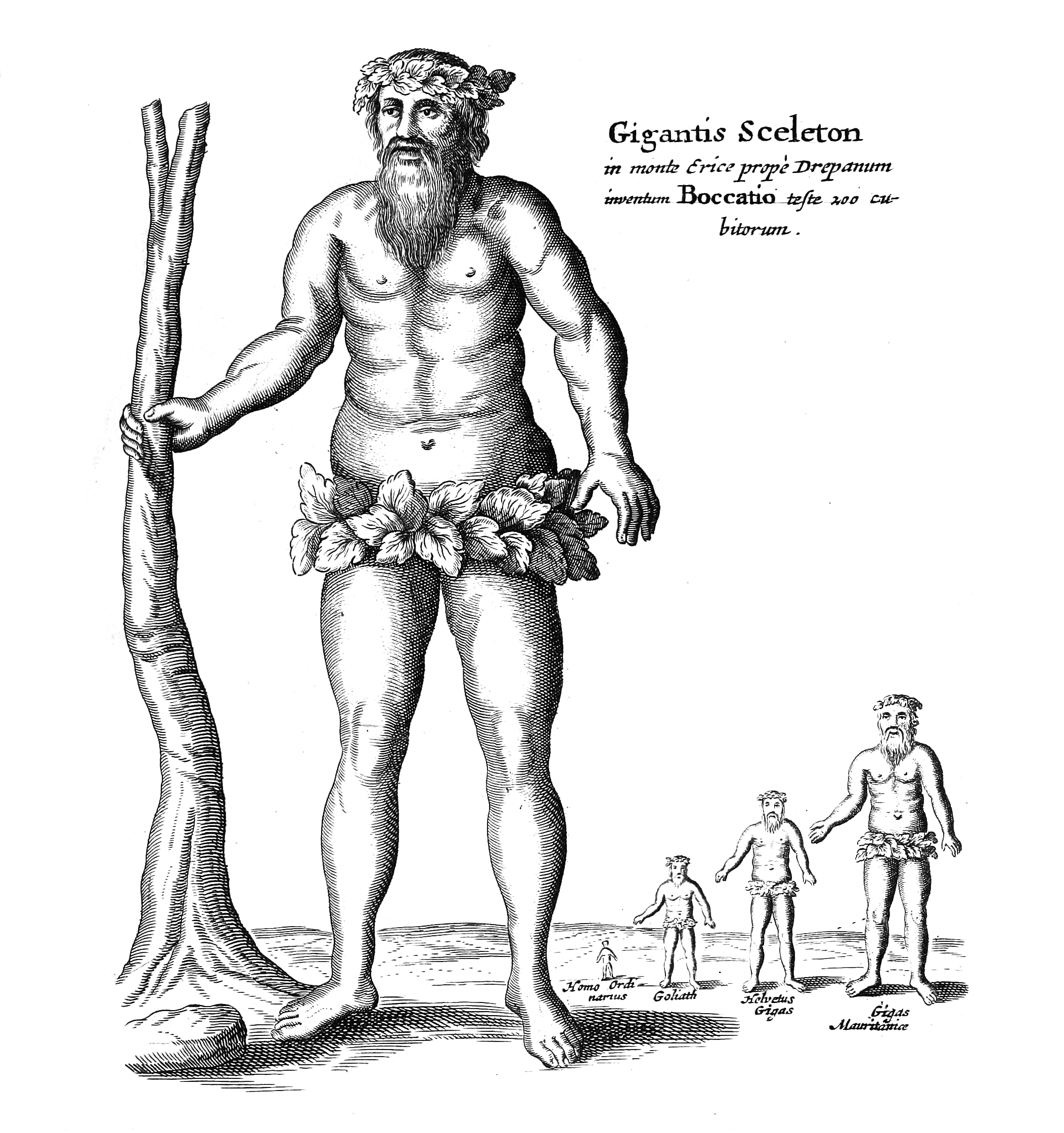
Illustration suggesting that fossil bones were from giants

In esoteric and occult teachings, giants are beings who live on spiritual, etheric and physical planes of existence. Giants were a popular theme in theosophical literature, Atlantis, lost continents and later the earth mysteries movement of Britain in the 1970s.

== History ==
The concept of giants was discussed by the theosophist and occult author Blavatsky who wrote about the existence of giants in her book The Secret Doctrine connecting them to her theory of root races and claiming they correspond with Hindu cycle of the universe. According to theosophists, giants were the third root race who lived on the continent of Lemuria. Theosophists also linked giants to the Atlantean race.

The German occultist Guido von List was influenced by Blavatsky's writings on giants and mixed together paganism, mythology, and theosophy, creating a basis for the belief in giants living in different realms based on the first four rounds of the root race theory.

R. A. Schwaller de Lubicz, an Egyptologist and traditionalist, believed that giants had roamed the earth, and that after the fall of Adam, humanity fell into a state of degeneration.

Lewis Spence, a writer on mythology, was critical of theosophy but accepted the existence of giants. He researched English folklore and mythology depicting such giants such as Magog and the British giant Albion. Another writer who was opposed to occultism was the British journalist and author William Comyns Beaumont. Like Spence, he accepted the existence of giants based on folklore, mythology, and archeology. Beaumont believed that Britain was the location of Atlantis and that it was occupied by a giant race of Aryans.

In the 1970s many of the authors of the earth mysteries movement in Britain wrote about Giants. John Michell wrote about the existence of giants in his book The View over Atlantis. Anthony Roberts wrote the book Sowers of Thunder: Giants in Myth and History in 1978, in which he claimed that giants were the original inhabitants of the British Isles and linked Alfred Watkins' ley lines to the British giants.
