= Woolhope Naturalists' Field Club =

Club of naturalists based in Woolhope, Herefordshire, 1851 onwards

The Woolhope Naturalists' Field Club (or simply the Woolhope Club) is a society devoted to the natural history, geology, archaeology, and history of Herefordshire, England. Founded in 1851, it has had many notable members and played an important early role in the history of mycology in Britain.

== Foundation ==
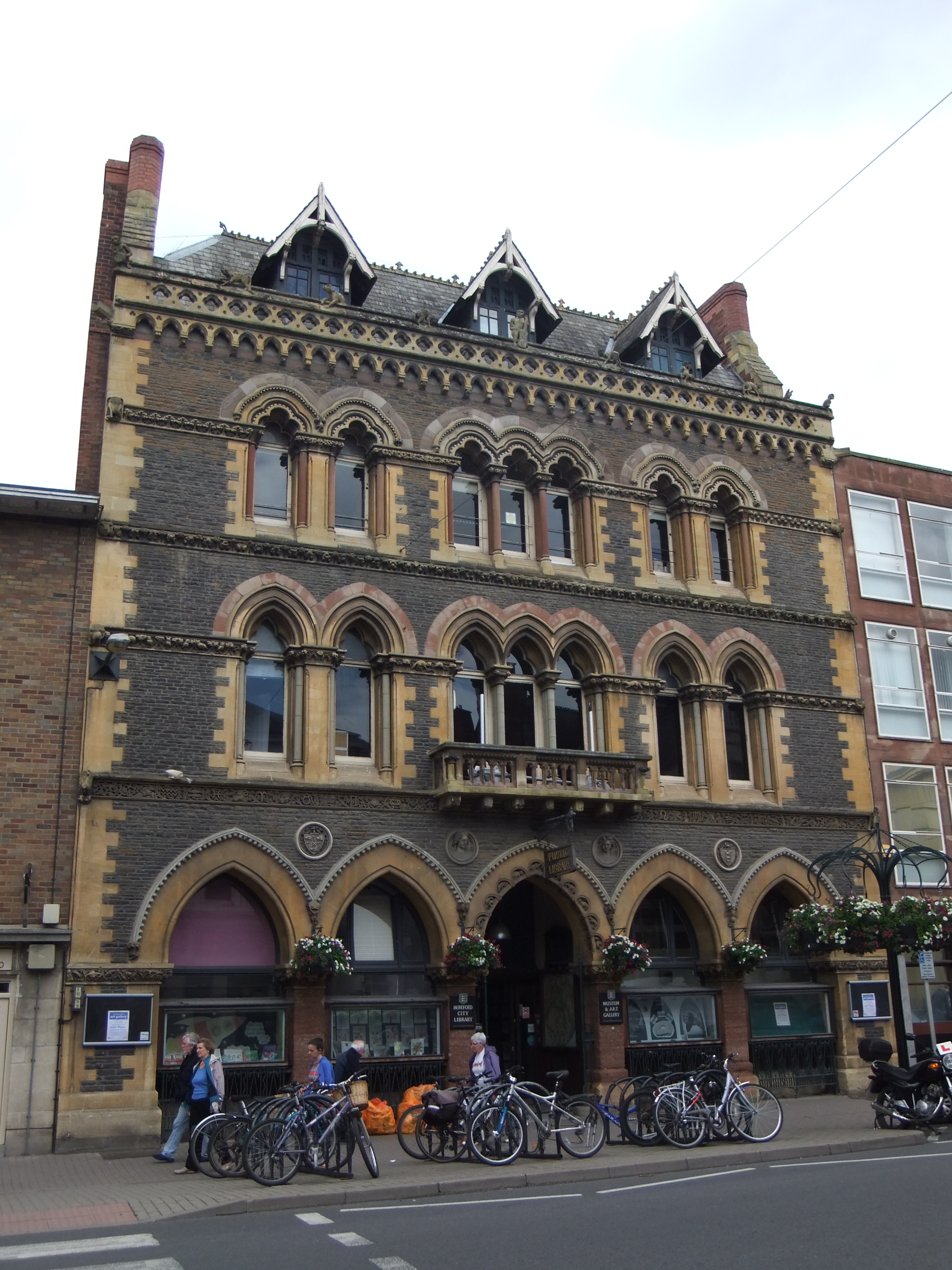
Hereford Museum and Art Gallery

The Woolhope Naturalists' Field Club was founded in 1851 "for the practical study, in all its branches, of the Natural History of Herefordshire and the districts immediately adjacent". The club was and still is based in the city of Hereford, but took its name from the Woolhope Dome, an outcrop of Silurian rocks around the village of Woolhope to the south-east of the city. The club's first field meeting was held in the Woolhope area.

The club's Transactions have been published regularly since 1856, and early issues suggest that the membership took an interest not only in geology, but in fossils, botany, meteorology, ichthyology, and entomology. In 1856, the botanist George Bentham (who lived at Pontrilas) was an honorary member, as were the geologists the Rev. Peter Bellinger Brodie, William Henry Fitton, Leonard Horner, Sir Charles Lyell, Sir Roderick Murchison, Prof. John Phillips, and the Rev. Prof. Adam Sedgwick, the botanist John Lindley, the naturalist Sir William Jardine, and the zoologist Prof. Robert E. Grant. The geologist the Rev. William Samuel Symonds was a founder member and president of the club in 1855.

In 1871, Sir James Rankin, a wealthy member of the club, offered to pay for a "Public Library and Museum in connection with the Woolhope Naturalists' Field Club". This building, with natural history carvings and gargoyles on its frontage and a purpose-built meeting room for the club, was duly erected in Hereford in 1873. It remains the city's main public library, Hereford Museum and Art Gallery and the club's headquarters.

The club did not permit women to become members until 1954.

== The Herefordshire Pomona ==
Since Herefordshire was and is renowned for its cider and perry, an early project of the club was to document and conserve local apple and pear cultivars. To this end, the club held annual exhibitions of local fruit, inviting leading pomologists to help identify samples collected or submitted from local orchards. Under the enthusiastic direction of founder and past president of the club, Dr Henry Graves Bull, two local artists, his daughter Edith Elizabeth Bull and Alice Blanche Ellis, were engaged to paint watercolours of the fruit, whilst an honorary member, Dr Robert Hogg, vice-president of the Royal Horticultural Society, wrote text to accompany the paintings. The result was the Herefordshire Pomona, a major publication for the club, issued in parts between 1878 and 1884, with over 400 paintings reproduced as hand-coloured lithographs.

The Herefordshire Pomona was an expensive work – and is now even more so, a copy being offered for $19,500 in 2009. Since the club wished the book to be of practical use, a revised but inexpensive version of the text, called The Apple and Pear as Vintage Fruits, was published in 1886. The Pomona itself is now available on CD.

== "A foray among the funguses" ==
Dr Henry Graves Bull also had an enthusiasm for fungi and in 1867 read a paper at a club meeting on some local, edible species. This seems to have stimulated the interest of the club and in 1868, the October field meeting – announced as "a foray among the funguses" – was devoted to collecting fungi. The foray, led by the noted mycologist Worthington G. Smith and local expert Edwin Lees, was followed by a special fungus dinner. The event proved popular and the "foray" was repeated annually till 1892.

These Woolhope fungus events became so well known that the word "foray" was widely adopted for mycological field meetings and remains the standard term today, not only in Britain but in North America and elsewhere. For a time, the club functioned as a precursor to the British Mycological Society, bringing together a number of contemporary British mycologists, many of whom attended the forays and contributed papers to the Transactions. By 1882, honorary members included the mycologists Rev. Miles Joseph Berkeley, C. E. Broome, Mordecai Cubitt Cooke, William Phillips, C. B. Plowright, Worthington G. Smith, and Rev. J. E. Vize. Ordinary members included Rev. W. L. W. Eyre.

== The Old Straight Track ==
An attendee at the 1891 fungus foray was Alfred Watkins, subsequently to become a president of the club. Watkins was a keen photographer and archaeologist. In June 1921, whilst mapping old sites near Blackwardine, Watkins noticed some surprising alignments which suggested to him a series of prehistoric trackways marked by ancient landmarks some of which were still visible. Later that year, he delivered a talk to the club on "Early British Trackways" and after further researches published his thesis and his findings in The Old Straight Track (1925). His book was not well received by academics, but Watkins' theory of ley lines gained followers and a resurgence of interest in the 1970s, when it acquired a mystic dimension which would have surprised Watkins himself.

== Current activities ==
The Woolhope Club still organises a series of field meetings each year, with special interest groups for archaeological research, geology, and natural history. To mark the 150th anniversary of the club a book, A Herefordshire Miscellany, was published in 2000.
