= Earth mysteries =

Range of beliefs regarding earthly supernatural phenomena

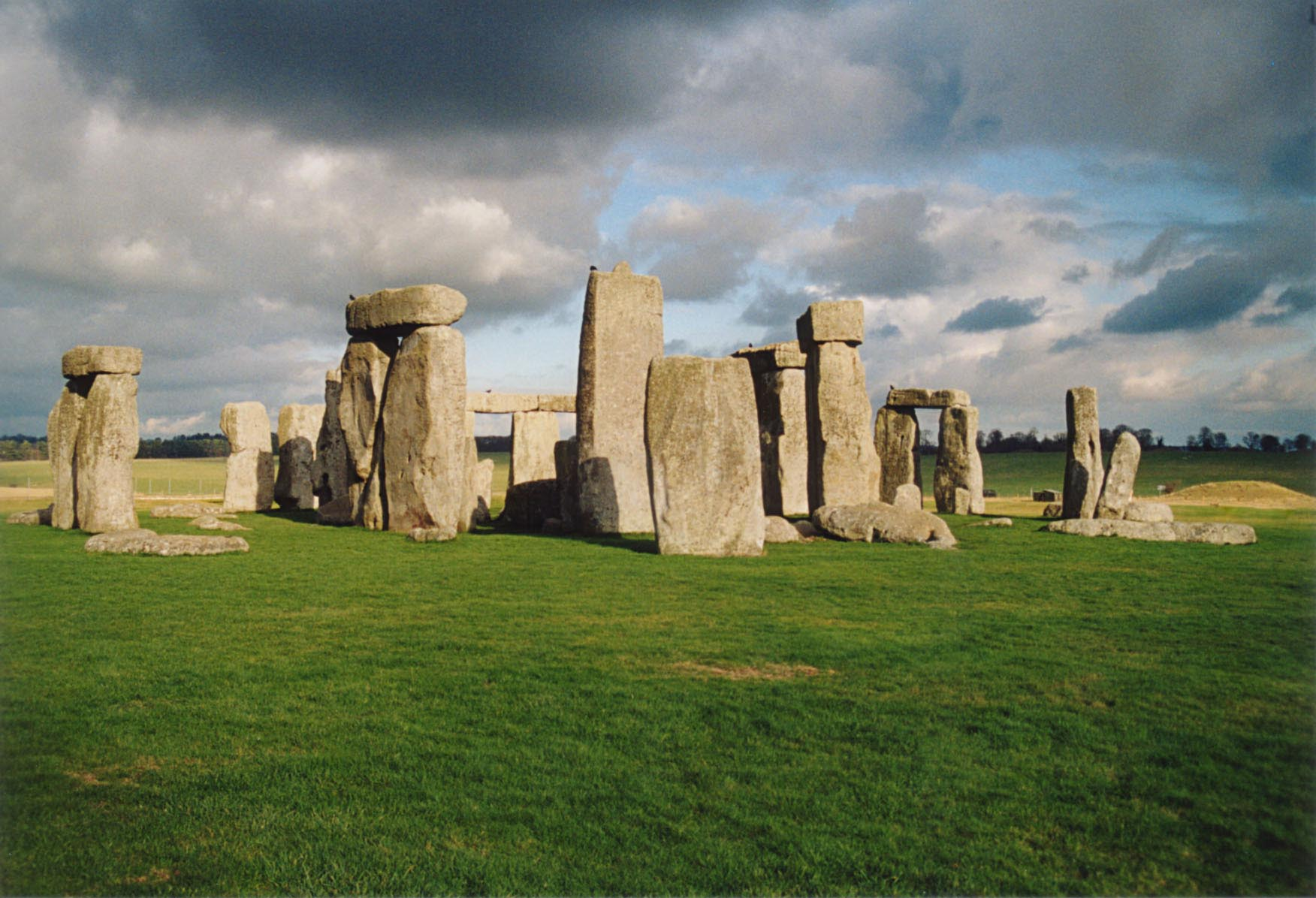
Stonehenge is considered an important location by some believers in Earth mysteries.

Earth mysteries are a wide range of spiritual and religious ideas focusing on cultural and religious beliefs about the Earth, generally with a regard for specific geographic locations of historic importance. Similar to modern druidry, prehistoric monuments are of particular spiritual importance to believers in Earth mysteries who consider certain locations to be sacred and/or containing active spiritual energies. The term "alternative archaeology" has also been used to describe the study of Earth mystery beliefs.

The study of ley lines originates in the 1920s with Alfred Watkins. The term "Earth mysteries" for this field of interest was coined about 1970 in The Ley Hunter journal, and the associated concepts have been embraced and reinvented by movements such as the New Age Movement and modern paganism during the 1970s to 1980s.

Some New Age believers engage in travel to locations they consider important according to their beliefs; for example, Stonehenge is a popular destination amongst New Age seekers.

== History ==
The concept of Earth mysteries can be traced back to two 17th-century antiquarians: John Aubrey and William Stukeley, who both believed that Stonehenge was associated with the druids. Stukeley mixed together ancient monuments and mythology towards an idealized vision of nature.

Ley lines were postulated by Alfred Watkins in 1921 at a presentation at the Woolhope Naturalists' Field Club, later published in Early British Trackways (1922) and The Old Straight Track (1925). Watkins formed the Old Straight Track Club in 1927, which was active until 1935 but became defunct during the World War II period.

A revival of interest in the topic began in the 1960s, now associated with neopagan currents like Wicca, and with ufology. Watkins' Straight Track Club was revived in 1962 by Philip Heselton and others as the Ley Hunters' Club. The new club's journal The Ley Hunter was issued from 1965 to 1970, subtitled "the Magazine of Earth Mysteries".

More books on Earth mysteries appeared in the 1970s, discussing topics such as ley lines, earth energies, astro-archaeology, sacred landscapes, megalithic monuments, shamanism, paganism, dowsing and folklore.

British writer John Ivimy wrote a book in 1975 called The Sphinx and the Megaliths in which he linked the Egyptian Sphinx to the British Stonehenge and other megalithic structures, writing that they were all built by a group of elite-trained people.

The New Age boom of the 1980s expanded the scope of the Earth mysteries field beyond the British landscape, and by the 1990s could include the study of ancient sites and landscapes (including archaeology, archaeoastronomy, and ley lines), Chinese geomancy or feng shui, western magical concepts of gematria, and dowsing. An important writer combining these fields during the 1970s to 2000s was John Michell. Michell's book The View Over Atlantis mixed ley lines with folklore and archeology; these ideas became popularised as earth mysteries. Other 1980s authors on the subject of Earth mysteries include Paul Devereux and Nigel Pennick.

== Reception ==
Proponents consider the Earth mysteries to be sacred and mythopoeic rather than scientific. The ley lines idea has been generally ignored by the academic establishment in the field of archaeology. The work of researchers who support the paranormal aspects of Earth mysteries have been extensively criticized by professional debunkers such as James Randi, Martin Gardner, and the Committee for the Scientific Investigation of Claims of the Paranormal (CSICOP).

The Earth mysteries movement in Great Britain embraced the term "ritual landscapes" that was used in British archaeology starting in the 1980s, with regards to sacred locations apparently used for mainly ceremonial purposes in the Neolithic and the early Bronze Age; the concept has been both adopted and criticized in the field of academic archaeology. Tourism associated with the Earth mysteries movement in this regard is known as the landscape heritage segment of the market.

== See also ==
- Psychogeography
