= John Michell (writer) =

British writer

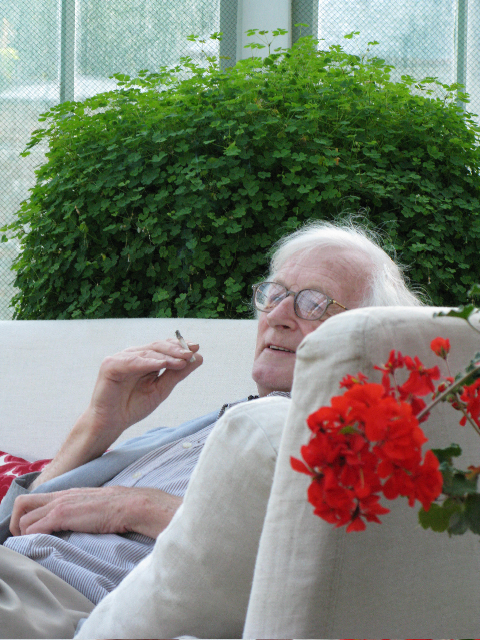
- Michell in 2008
- Born: 9 February 1933; London, England
- Died: 24 April 2009 (aged 76); Stoke Abbott, Dorset, England
- Education: Eton College
- Alma mater: Trinity College, Cambridge
- Children: Jason Goodwin
- Writing career
- Genre: Forteana
- Subjects: Earth mysteries, ufology, traditionalism
- Notable works: The Flying Saucer Vision; The View Over Atlantis; The Measure of Albion; Who Wrote Shakespeare?

John Frederick Carden Michell (9 February 1933 – 24 April 2009) was an English author and esotericist who was a prominent figure in the development of the Earth mysteries movement. Over the course of his life he published over forty books on an array of different subjects, being a proponent of the Traditionalist school of esoteric thought.

Born in London to a wealthy family, Michell was educated at Cheam School and Eton College before serving as a Russian translator in the Royal Navy for two years. After failing a degree in Russian and German at Trinity College, Cambridge, he qualified as a chartered surveyor then returned to London and worked for his father's property business, there developing his interest in Ufology. Embracing the counter-cultural ideas of the Earth mysteries movement during the 1960s, in The Flying Saucer Vision he built on Alfred Watkins' ideas of ley lines by arguing that they represented linear marks created in prehistory to guide extraterrestrial spacecraft. He followed this with his most influential work, The View Over Atlantis, in 1969. His ideas were at odds with those of academic archaeologists, for whom he expressed contempt. Michell believed in the existence of an ancient spiritual tradition that connected humanity to divinity, but which had been lost as a result of modernity. He believed however that this tradition would be revived and that humanity would enter a Golden Age, with Britain as the centre of this transformation.

Michell's other publications covered an eclectic range of topics, and included an overview on the Shakespeare authorship question, a tract condemning Salman Rushdie during The Satanic Verses controversy, and a book of Adolf Hitler's quotations. Keenly interested in the crop circle phenomenon, he co-founded a magazine devoted to the subject, The Cereologist, in 1990, and served as its initial editor. From 1992 until his death he wrote a column for The Oldie magazine, which was largely devoted to his anti-modernist opinions. He accompanied this with a column on esoteric topics for the Daily Mirror tabloid. A lifelong marijuana smoker, Michell died of lung cancer in 2009.

Michell's impact in the Earth mysteries movement was considerable, and through it he also influenced the British Pagan movement. During the 2000s, his ideas also influenced the "Radical Traditionalist" sector of the far right, epitomized by the journal Tyr.

== Biography ==
=== Early life ===
"When I was at Cambridge the whole atmosphere was extremely rationalistic materialistic. Everyone believed the current academic orthodoxies of the time and there seemed no way of questioning them. I was never really sympathetic to them, but I saw no way of questioning them. The first possibility of a breakout occurred to me at the beginning of the UFO phenomenon, in the Fifties when the first UFO books were coming out. It was quite obvious that people were having experiences that weren't allowed for within the context of our education."

— John Michell.

John Frederick Carden Michell was born in London on 9 February 1933. His father, Alfred Henry Michell, was of Cornish & Welsh descent and worked as a property dealer in the capital, while his mother Enid Evelyn (née Carden) was the daughter of Major Sir Frederick Carden, 3rd Baronet, great-granddaughter of Sir Robert Carden, 1st Baronet, who served as Lord Mayor of London in 1857, and 3x great-granddaughter of John Walter, founder of The Times. The eldest of three children, Michell's siblings were named Charles and Clare. Michell was raised at Stargroves, his maternal grandfather's Victorian-era estate on the Berkshire Downs near to Newbury, and it was here that he developed a love of the countryside, learning about the local flora and fauna from a neighbouring naturalist. He was raised into the Anglican denomination of Christianity, although in later life rejected the religion. Michell was initially educated as a boarder at the preparatory Cheam School, where he was Head Boy and excelled at the high jump. From there he went to study at Eton College, where he was a contemporary of Lord Moyne and Ian Cameron, the father of future Prime Minister David Cameron.

He spent his two years of national service in the Royal Navy, during which time he qualified as a Russian translator at the School of Slavonic Studies. He then went on to study Russian and German at Trinity College, Cambridge, although was unable to secure a third-class degree. He then qualified as a chartered surveyor at a firm in Gloucestershire, before moving back to London to work for his father's property business. Commenting on this job, he later stated that it was "quite amusing, but of course I wasn't any good at it", with property speculators eroding much of his fortune.

In 1966 one of his properties, the basement of his own residence, became the base of the London Free School. The Black Power activist Michael X, having previously run a gambling club in the basement, had now become active in the organisation of the LFS and brought Michell into counter-culture activities. Michell began to offer courses in UFOs and ley lines.

In 1964, with Jocasta Innes, Michell fathered a son, Jason Goodwin, who also became a writer. The relationship with Innes did not last. Jason Goodwin did not meet his natural father until 1992, at the age of 28, at which point they became quite close.

=== Embracing the Earth Mysteries movement ===
Michell developed an interest in Ufology and Earth mysteries after attending a talk given by Jimmy Goddard at Kensington Central Library on the subject of "Leys and Orthonies" in November 1965. Michell's first publication on the subject of Ufology was the article "Flying Saucers", which appeared in the 30 January 1967 edition of the counter-cultural newspaper International Times. He proceeded to write a book on the subject, but lost the original manuscript after accidentally leaving it in a North London café, at which he had to rewrite it. The book eventually saw publication as The Flying Saucer Vision, published in 1967, when Michell was 35 years old.

"Although the British Earth Mysteries movement existed in some fashion before John Michell came onto the scene, Michell functioned in a synthetic fashion by bringing together and popularizing several different strands of esoteric belief relating to sacred Britain, and in the late 1960s he found a new market hungry for publications on such subjects."

— Amy Hale, 2011.

The Flying Saucer Vision took the idea of Tony Wedd that ley lines – alleged trackways across the landscape whose existence was first argued by Alfred Watkins – represented markers for the flight of extraterrestrial spacecraft and built on it, arguing that early human society was aided by alien entities who were understood as gods, but that these extraterrestrials had abandoned humanity because of the latter's greed for material and technological development. According to Lachman, at this time Michell took the view that "an imminent revelation of literally inconceivable scope" was at hand, and that the appearance of UFOs was linked to "the start of a new phase in our history". Many fans of Michell's work consider it to be "by far his most impressive book". In their social history of Ufology, David Clarke and Andy Roberts stated that Michell's work was "the catalyst and helmsman" for the growing interest in UFOs among the hippie sector of the counter-culture.

Subsequently, there was a shift in Michell's emphasis as he became increasingly interested in the landscapes in which he believed that ley lines could be found rather than the UFOs themselves. He wrote an article on "Lung Mei and the Dragon Paths of England" for a September 1967 issue of Image magazine, in which he compared British ley-lines to the Chinese mythological idea of lung mei lines, arguing that this was evidence of a widespread pre-Christian dragon cult in ancient Britain. He built on these ideas for The View Over Atlantis, a book which he privately published in 1969, with a republication following three years later. Believing this earth energy to be a real magnetic phenomenon arising naturally from the ground, Michell argued that an ancient religious-scientific elite had traveled the world constructing the lines and various megalithic monuments in order to channel this energy and direct it for the good of humanity. The tone of his work reflected "a fervent religious feeling", describing the existence of an ancient, universal, and true system of belief that was once spread across the ancient world but which had been lost through the degeneracy of subsequent generations. He added however that this ancient knowledge would be revived with the dawning of the Age of Aquarius, allowing for what Michell described as the "rediscovery of access to the divine will".

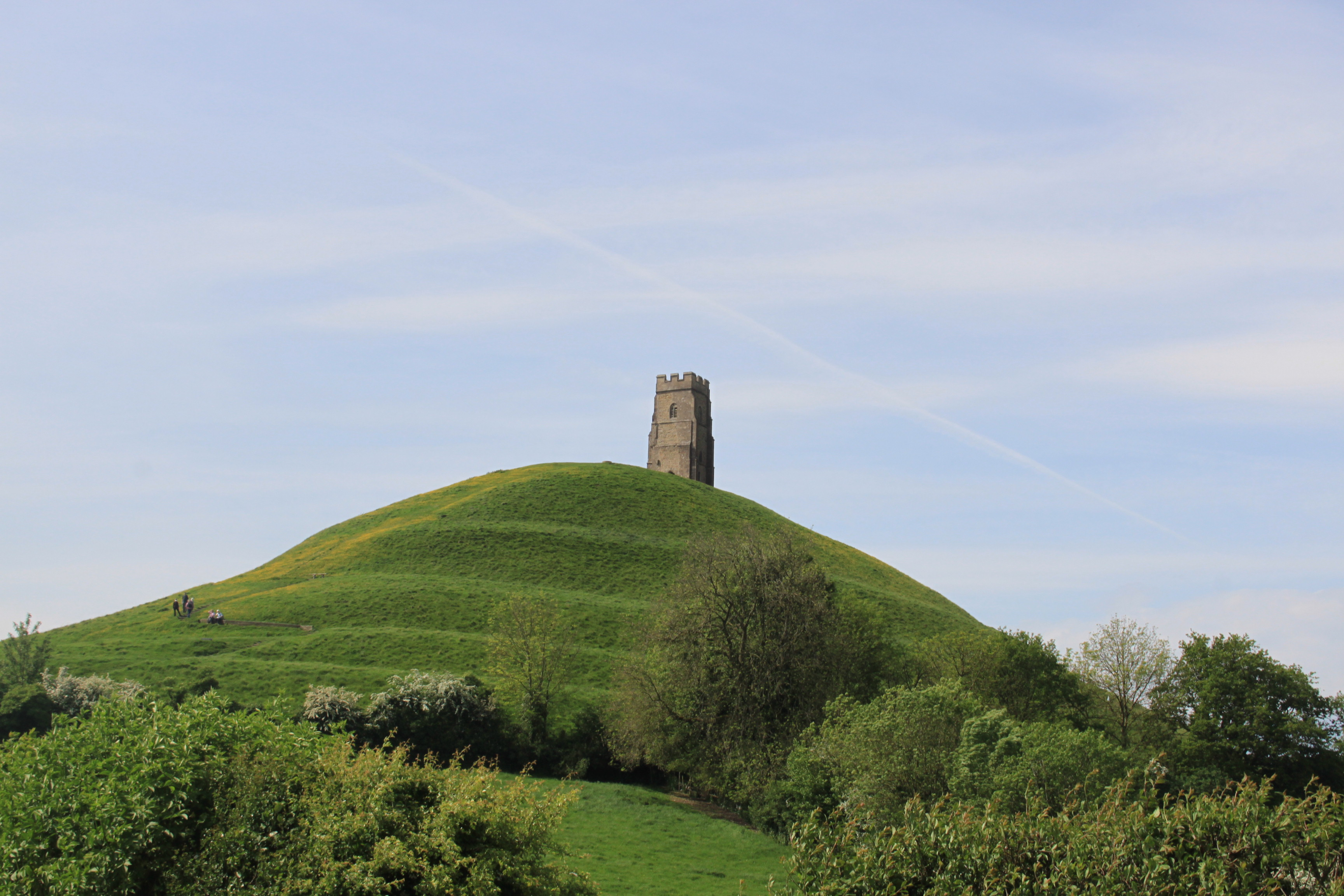
Michell viewed Glastonbury (pictured) as a place of sacred power

The Pagan studies scholar Amy Hale stated that The View Over Atlantis was "a smash countercultural success", while the historian Ronald Hutton described it as "almost the founding document of the modern earth mysteries movement". Fellow ley-hunter and later biographer Paul Screeton considered it to be a "groundbreaking" work which "re-enchanted the British landscape and empowered a generation to seek out and appreciate the spiritual dimension of the countryside, not least attracting them to reawaken the sleepy town of Glastonbury". The book inspired an array of Earth Mysteries publications in the 1970s and 1980s, accompanied by growth in the ley-hunting movement. Among the most prominent works to build on Michell's ideas during this period were Janet and Colin Bord's Mysterious Britain, which used them in its presentation of a gazetteer of ancient sites, and Paul Screeton's Quicksilver Heritage, which argued that the Neolithic had been a time devoted to spiritual endeavours which had been corrupted by the emergence of metal technologies. Michell associated with many individuals active in this ley-hunting community, and in July 1971 was one of many attendees at a ley-hunters picnic held at Risbury Camp, the largest outdoor gathering of the movement since 1939.

In May 1969 Michell established a group known as the Research Into Lost Knowledge Organisation (RILKO) with his friends Keith Critchlow and Mary Williams. In conjunction with the Garnstone Press, RILKO founded the Prehistory and Ancient Science Library, a book series that brought out reprints of older works, such as Watkins' The Old Straight Track and William Stirling's The Canon, both of which contained forewords by Michell. Michell also founded a small publishing company of his own, West Country Editions, through which he brought out his own A Little History of Bladud in 1973 as well as a reprint of Howard C. Levis's 1919 book Bladud of Bath. With his friend John "Peewee" Michael, who lived in Bristol, Michell also established a second small press, Pentacle Books, although it failed to become a commercial success and was short lived.

Michell was involved in the summer 1971 Glastonbury Fayre music festival near Pilton, Somerset, where the pyramid stage was built to Michell's specifications and situated at what he claimed were the apex of two ley lines. Through Michael Rainey, Michell was introduced to the members of rock band The Rolling Stones at the Courtfield Road home of band member Brian Jones. Michell befriended the band's lead singer, Mick Jagger, and he accompanied the band on a visit to Stonehenge. Michell then went on a visit to Woolhope in Herefordshire with Keith Richards, Anita Pallenberg, Christopher Gibbs, and the filmmaker Kenneth Anger, where they hunted for ley lines and UFOs. Marianne Faithfull later recounted that band member Jones was particularly interested in Michell's ideas. He would later meet with the members of The Grateful Dead on their 1972 European tour; band members Phil Lesh and Jerry Garcia expressed an interest in Michell's Earth Mysteries ideas.

Michell's impact on the hippie subculture was recognised by mainstream media, and he was invited to submit an article titled "Flying saucers" to The Listener in May 1968, which was accompanied by a critical piece by editor Karl Miller, in which Michell was described as "less a hippy, perhaps, than a hippy's counsellor, one of their junior Merlins." Hale noted that Michell promoted the idea of "England as a site of spiritual redemption in the New Age", bringing together "popular ideas about sacred geometry, Druids, sacred landscapes, earth energies, Atlantis, and UFOs".

In 1972 Michell published a sequel to The View Over Atlantis as City of Revelation. Shortly after publication he stated that he had written the work in "almost two years of near total solitude and intense study in Bath." This work was more complex than its predecessor, including chapters on sacred geometry, numerology, gematria, and the esoteric concept of the New Jerusalem, and required an understanding of mathematics and Classics to follow its arguments. Bob Rickard, founding editor of Fortean Times, has written that Michell's first three works "provided a synthesis of and a context for all the other weirdness of the era. It's fair to say that it played a big part in the foundation of Fortean Times itself by helping create a readership that wanted more things to think about and a place to discuss them. The overall effect was to help the burgeoning interest in strange phenomena spread out into mainstream culture."

=== Challenging academic archaeology ===
Michell's "New Jerusalem" sacred geometry diagram

The work of Michell and others in the ley-hunting and Earth mysteries communities were rejected by the professional archaeological establishment, with the prominent British archaeologist Glyn Daniel denouncing what he perceived as the "lunatic fringe". In turn, Michell was hostile to professional and academic archaeologists, accusing them of "treasure hunting and grave robbery" and viewing them as representations of what he interpreted as the evils of modernity. In response to the academic archaeological community's refusal to take the idea of ley lines seriously, in 1970 Michell offered a challenge for professional archaeologists to disprove his ideas regarding the West Peninsula leys. He stated that were he to be proved wrong then he would donate a large sum to charity, but at the time no one took up his offer.

However, in 1983 his case study was analysed by two archaeologists, Tom Williamson and Liz Bellamy, as part of their work Ley Lines in Question, a critical analysis of the evidence for ley-lines. They highlighted that Michell had erroneously included medieval crosses and natural features under his definition of late prehistoric monuments, and that arguments for ley-lines more widely could not be sustained. The impact of their work on the ley-hunting community was substantial, with one section moving in a more fully religious direction by declaring that leys could only be detected by intuition, and the other renouncing a ley line belief in favour of a more ethnographically rooted analysis of linear connections in the landscape. Responding to their work, Michell said that "I just feel sorry for Williamson and Bellamy that the most exciting thing they can find to do with their youth is to discredit the ley vision."

In 1983 Michell published an altered version of his best known work as The New View Over Atlantis.

Ioan Culianu, a specialist in gnosticism and Renaissance esoteric studies, in a review in 1991 of The Dimensions of Paradise: The Proportions and Symbolic Numbers in Ancient Cosmology, expressed the view that, "After some deliberation the reader of this book will oscillate between two hypotheses: either that many mysteries of the universe are based on numbers, or that the book's author is a fairly learned crank obsessed with numbers."

In 1970, Michell founded the Anti-Metrification Board to oppose the adoption of the metric system of measurement in the United Kingdom. Believing that the established imperial system of measurement had both ancient and sacred origins, through the Board he brought out a newsletter, Just Measure. In 1972 he published the first of his "Radical Traditionalist Papers", A Defence of Sacred Measures, in which he laid out his opposition to the metric system. In his third Radical Traditionalist Paper, published in 1973, he argued against population control, critiquing the ideas of Thomas Robert Malthus and arguing that correct use of resources could maintain an ever-growing human population. His fifth Radical Traditionalist Paper, Concordance to High Monarchists, offered Michell's proposed solution to The Troubles of Northern Ireland; in his view, Ireland should be divided into four provinces, each administered separately but all ultimately pledging allegiance to a High King, in this way mirroring what Michell believed was the socio-political organisation of prehistoric Ireland.

=== Other publications ===
Following the 1975 execution of Michael X for a murder committed in Trinidad, Michell published a souvenir pamphlet to commemorate the execution, claiming that all royalties from its publication would go to Michael X's widow. In 1976 he published The Hip Pocket Hitler, a book containing those quotations from Adolf Hitler, the leader of Nazi Germany, which Michell deemed to be humorous or insightful, thus seeking to portray a side to Hitler that was more favourable than the dominant paradigm. In 1979 he provided an introduction to a translation of Pliny the Elder's Inventorum Natura, which had been illustrated by Una Woodruff. That same year he brought out Simulcra, a work in which he examined perceived faces in natural forms such as trees. In collaboration with Bob Rickard, in 1977 Michell published Phenomena: A Book of Wonders, an encyclopedic work devoted to paranormal and fortean phenomena which covered such topics as UFOs, werewolves, lake monsters, and spontaneous human combustion. They followed this with a second encyclopedic volume, Living Wonders: Mysteries and Curiosities of the Animal World, which appeared in 1982 and was devoted to fortean topics involving animals, with much of it focusing on cryptozoological topics.

In 1984 he published Eccentric Lives and Peculiar Notions, in which he provided brief biographies of various figures whose ideas had been rejected by mainstream scholarship and society, among them Nesta Webster, Iolo Morganwg, Brinsley Trench, and Comyns Beaumont. In Euphonics: A Poet's Dictionary of Sounds he then argued that every name represents a "vocal imitation" of the subject that it describes, for instance arguing that "s" appears in the words "snake" and "serpent" because it resembles the curved movement of the animal. Following the controversy that erupted around Salman Rushdie's 1988 book The Satanic Verses, Michell published a tract condemning Rushdie, accusing him of deliberately and provocatively insulting Islam. Titled Rushdie's Insult, Michell later withdrew the publication.

Michell was keenly interested in the crop circle phenomenon, and with Christine Rhone and Richard Adams he established a magazine devoted to the subject in 1990. Initially titled The Cereologist, some issues would be alternately titled The Cerealogist, and although Michell initially served as the magazine's editor, he stepped down after the ninth issue, although continued to contribute articles to it. In 1991, he published a book on the subject, Dowsing the Crop Circles, and in 2001 followed this with a booklet titled The Face and the Message, which was devoted to a circle depicting the face of a Grey alien which had appeared in Hampshire in August 2001. Despite the longstanding animosity with which Michell held academic archaeology, in 1991 the peer-reviewed archaeological journal Antiquity invited him to author a review of a Southbank exhibit, "From Art to Archaeology", which was duly published in the journal.

In the 1980s Michell was a member of the Lindisfarne Association and a teacher at its School of Sacred Architecture. He lectured at the Kairos Foundation, an "educational charity specifically founded to promote the recovery of traditional values in the Arts and Sciences". He was for some years a visiting lecturer at the Prince of Wales' School of Traditional Arts, which had been established by his friend Keith Critchlow. He became a Fellow of the Temenos Academy, a religious organisation which had Traditionalist underpinnings.

=== Newspaper columnist: 1992–2009 ===
From January 1992 until his death, Michell published a monthly column, "An Orthodox Voice", in The Oldie magazine. He primarily used this as an outlet for condemning the modern world and lambasting what he perceived as the stupidity of most contemporary humans. His first article in this outlet contained an attack on evolution which resulted in a published response from the evolutionary biologist Richard Dawkins. He also used his column to encourage the use of mind-altering drugs, in particular LSD. Two anthologies that collected together some of these Oldie columns would be published; the first appeared in 1995 as An Orthodox Voice while the second was published in 2005 as Confessions of a Radical Traditionalist and contained an introduction from the scholar of esotericism Joscelyn Godwin. During this period, Michell also authored occasional book reviews for the conservative magazine, The Spectator.

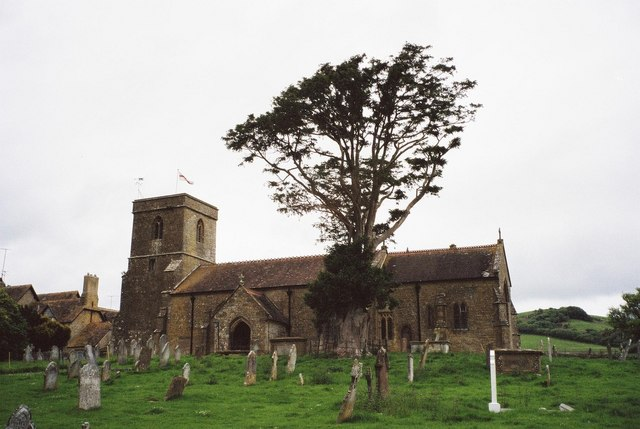
St Mary's Church, Stoke Abbott, where Michell's body was buried

In 1996 Michell published Who Wrote Shakespeare?, in which he outlined various candidates in the Shakespeare authorship question. Who Wrote Shakespeare? received mixed reviews: Publishers Weekly was critical, while The Washington Post and The Independent praised his treatment of the subject. To mark their fiftieth anniversary in 1999, the publisher Thames and Hudson – who had published many of Michell's works – suggested that a biography be written by Michell's friend Paul Screeton. Michell however refused to cooperate with the project, which was abandoned. In 2000, Michell published The Temple at Jerusalem: A Revelation, in which he outlined his own interpretation of Jerusalem's Old City.

From 2001 to 2004 he contributed several columns to tabloid newspaper The Mirror as part of an ongoing series run by the astrologer Jonathan Cainer. Cainer had sought to bring together a range of esotericists to write on related topics, with Michell's fellow contributors including Mark Winter, Patty Greenall, Sarah Sirillan, and Uri Geller. The series came to an end when Cainer left The Mirror to work for the rival Daily Mail.

A keen painter, in 2003 an exhibit of his works was held at the Christopher Gibbs Gallery. In April 2007 Michell married Denise Price, the Archdruidess of the Glastonbury Order of Druids, at a ceremony held in Glastonbury's St Benedict's Church, although their relationship ended several months later. A lifelong smoker, Michell contracted lung cancer, and in his final days he was nursed at his son's home in Poole, Dorset, ultimately dying on 24 April 2009, at the age of 76. His body was buried at St Mary's Church in Stoke Abbott on May Day. A high church memorial service was then held at All Saints' Church in Notting Hill, which was attended by around 400 mourners. His work, How the World is Made – which he regarded as his magnum opus – was published posthumously.

== Thought ==
"The essentials of John's personal cosmology can be summarized simple as: the human mind can be seen imaged in the canon, a complete cosmology and model of all reality; the origin of human intelligence is still totally mysterious, with no evidence of evolution or gradual development; neither of the above were the result of intervention other than revelation, as sacred history and tradition avers; humankind has been in decline since early prehistory."

— Michell's friend and biographer Paul Screeton, 2010.

Throughout his life, Michell's "views remained relatively static", albeit with some exceptions. He characterised his viewpoint as "Radical Traditionalism", which in his words was a perspective "both idealistic and rooted in common sense". Michell was a proponent of the Traditionalist school of esoteric thought. Michell was also interested in the writings of Traditionalist philosopher Julius Evola, agreeing in particular with the sentiments expressed in Evola's Revolt Against the Modern World. He held to the Traditionalist belief in an ancient perennial tradition found across the world, believing that this was passed on by a priesthood in accordance to divine will. He shared the Traditionalist attitude of anti-modernism, believing that modernity had brought about chaos, destruction of the land, and spiritual degradation. He believed that humanity would return to what he perceived as its natural order and enter a Golden Age.

Screeton believed that despite his "obvious acts of liberalism", Michell also had a "right-wing streak", with Hale describing Mitchell as being "quite right-wing in many of his views". She thought it would be "apt" to characterise Mitchell's thought as being "third positionist" in nature.

Angered by the idea of evolution, Michell repeatedly authored articles denouncing it as a false creation myth. Instead he embraced a viewpoint that Screeton referred to as "intelligent design creationism". Accordingly, he was particularly critical of Charles Darwin and Dawkins, lambasting the latter alongside physicist Stephen Hawking as belonging with "the disappointed Marxists, pandering politicians, pettifoggers, grievance-mongers and atheistic bishops who set the tone in modern society." Condemning the scientific community's view of the development of the Earth and humanity, he embraced Richard Milton's claim that the Earth was only 20,000 years old, as well as Rupert Sheldrake's idea regarding "morphogenetic fields", believing that it was these – and not biological evolution – that resulted in changes occurring within species.

Michell's conception of the physical and spiritual worlds was strongly influenced by the ancient Greek philosopher Plato. He believed that sacred geometry revealed a universal scheme in the landscape which reflected the structure of the heavens. His views on geometry led him to the belief that pre-industrial societies across the world respected the Earth as a living creature imbued with its own spirit, and that humans then created permanent residences for this spirit. He also embraced a belief in the tenets of astrology, alchemy, and prophecy, believing that all had been unfairly rejected by the modern world.

"A hallmark of the traditionalist is to see decline and degeneracy where other people see modernity and progress."

— John Michell.

Described as an exponent of "British nativist spirituality", he adopted the view of the British-Israelite movement that the British people represented the descendants of the Ten Lost Tribes who are mentioned in the Old Testament. Michell sometimes referred to his approach as "mystic nationalism" and interpreted the island of Britain as being sacred, connecting this attitude to those of William Blake and Lewis Spence. Adopting a millennialist attitude, he believed that in future Britain would be reborn as the New Jerusalem with the coming of a new Golden Age.

He believed that humans really desired to live in a state of extreme order, deeming a societal hierarchy to be natural and inevitable. Generally opposed to democracy, except within small groups in which every person knew the individual being elected, Michell instead believed that communities should be led by a strong leader who personified the solar deity. This embrace of the Divine Right of Kings led him to believe that Queen Elizabeth II should take control of Britain as an authoritarian leader who could intercede between the British people and the divine. He was critical of multiculturalism in Britain, believing that each ethnic or cultural group should live independently in an area segregated from other groups, stating that this would allow a people's traditions to remain vibrant. He did not espouse racial supremacy, with his ideas on this subject instead being similar to the ethnopluralism of Alain de Benoist and other New Right thinkers. He was an opponent of British membership of the European Union and also opposed the UK's transition to the metric system, instead favouring the continued use of imperial measurement, believing that the latter had links to the divine order used by ancient society.

== Personal life ==
"Michell was a one-off. An original. There will never be another like him. John was a scholar, polymath, iconoclast, antiquarian and mystic. An intellectual with an easy manner, dry wit and elegant writing style. A philosopher and author. With his revolutionary vision of prehistoric science far in advance of that accorded early civilisations by archaeologists – a modern-day Merlin of hippiedom – he greatly influenced the baby boomer generation by extolling countercultural values in the areas of earth mysteries, consciousness expansion and New Age thinking."

— Michell's friend and biographer Paul Screeton, 2010.

At over six feet in height, Michell was described by biographer and friend Paul Screeton as having "a charismatic personality and imposing presence", being "placidly outgoing and the epitome of gentlemanly charm", and usually appeared "cheerful and optimistic". In keeping with his upper-class background, he was described as having an "unmistakable patrician hauteur", with "all the self-assurance, impeccable manners and debonair charm of one born to wealth." Screeton described Michell as "gregarious but slightly shy, unassuming but opinionated. Quixotic in behaviour, he was an exemplary host and fastidious and single-minded when embarked upon a project", although also noted that Michell was impatient with those who did not share his Traditionalist beliefs and values.

In keeping with norms within the counter-culture, Michell regularly smoked marijuana, and publicly encouraged the use of mind-altering drugs. His favoured newspaper was The Telegraph, a right-wing daily. One of his hobbies was woodworking, and he constructed some of the bookshelves in his home. Although he had a strong dislike of computers and advised his readers not to possess a personal computer, in later life he obtained one in order to type up his writings using a word processor. For many years, he lived at 11 Powis Gardens in Notting Hill, North London.

== Legacy ==
Screeton described Michell as "a countercultural icon", while Hale stated that on his death, Michell left "a rich legacy of publications and cultural influence". At the time he was remembered as "a charming British eccentric and champion of the outsider". His influence was strongly apparent in the British Pagan community, with many British Pagans being familiar with his writings. The archaeologist Adam Stout noted that Michell played "the major role in the 1960s rediscovery" of the work of Alfred Watkins. Hutton for instance noted that the influence of Michell's ideas could be seen on the Druidic Order of the Pendragon, a Pagan group based in Leicestershire that arose to public attention in 2004. His ideas about dragon energies across the landscape have been incorporated into novels like Judy Allen's 1973 The Spring of the Mountain and Cara Louise's 2006 Annie and the Dragon.

Michell's books received a broadly positive reception amongst the "New Age" and "Earth mysteries" movements and he is credited as perhaps being "the most articulate and influential writer on the subject of leys and alternative studies of the past". Ronald Hutton describes his research as part of an alternative archaeology "quite unacceptable to orthodox scholarship." Accordingly, Screeton noted that during his life, Michell was considered to be "anathema, lunatic fringe, and cranky" by his critics, although he rejected the idea that Michell was a "crank", claiming that such an accusation was "fundamentally mistaken".

Following his death, various aspects of Michell's work have been adopted by thinkers associated with the European New Right and with related right-wing currents in the United States. Michell's term "Radical Traditionalism", which he espoused in his self-published series of "Radical Traditionalist Papers" in the 1970s and 1980s, would later be taken up as a self-descriptor by Michael Moynihan and Joshua Buckley, the editors of the right-wing journal Tyr: Myth, Culture and Tradition from their inaugural 2002 edition onward. The editors of Tyr gave the term political overtones which were not present in Michell's original usage of the term. Hale believed that through Radical Traditionalism and the New Right Michell's writings have been brought to "a whole new audience" where they have a "surprisingly different sort of relevance."

== Bibliography ==
- 1967 The Flying Saucer Vision: the Holy Grail Restored, Sidgwick & Jackson, Abacus Books, Ace. ISBN 978-0-349-12319-6
- 1969 The View Over Atlantis, HarperCollins, ISBN 978-0-902006-00-3; first published by Sago Press in Great Britain in 1969; new edition published in Great Britain by Garnstone Press in 1972 and Abacus in 1973, and in the United States by Ballantine Books in 1972.
- 1972 City of Revelation: On the Proportions and Symbolic Numbers of the Cosmic Temple, Garnstone Press, ISBN 978-0-85511-040-6, ISBN 0-85511-040-6
- 1974 The Old Stones of Land's End, Garnstone Press, ISBN 978-0-85511-370-4
- 1975 The Earth Spirit: Its Ways, Shrines, and Mysteries, Avon, ISBN 0-380-26880-9
- 1977 with R. J. M. Rickard, Phenomena: A Book of Wonders, Thames & Hudson, ISBN 0-500-01182-6
- 1977 A Little History of Astro-Archaeology: Stages in the Transformation of a Heresy , Thames and Hudson, SBN-10: 0500275572 SBN-10: 0500275572, ISBN 978-0-500-27557-3 (reprinted 2001)
- 1979 Natural Likeness: Faces and Figures in Nature, Thames and Hudson, ISBN 0-525-47584-2
- 1979 Plinius Scundus C., Inventorum Natura, HarperCollins, English Latin, D. MacSweeney (translator) ISBN 0-06-014726-1
- 1981 Ancient Metrology: the Dimensions of Stonehenge and of the Whole World as Therein Symbolized, Pentacle Books, ISBN 0-906850-05-3
- 1982 Megalithomania: Artists, Antiquarians & Archaeologists at the Old Stone Monuments, Thames and Hudson ISBN 0-500-27235-2, Cornell University Press ISBN 0-8014-1479-2
- 1983 The New View Over Atlantis, Thames and Hudson ISBN 0-500-01302-0, ISBN 0-500-27312-X, ISBN 978-0-500-27312-8 (Much revised edition of The View Over Atlantis.)
- 1984 Eccentric Lives and Peculiar Notions , Thames and Hudson, reissued Harcourt Brace Jovanovich, ISBN 0-15-127358-8
- 1985 Stonehenge – Its Druids, Custodians, Festival and Future , Richard Adams Associates (June 1985) ISBN 0-948508-00-0, ISBN 978-0-948508-00-4
- 1988 Geosophy – An Overview of Earth Mysteries. Paul Devereux, John Steele, John Michell, Nigel Pennick, Martin Brennan, Harry Oldfield and more, a Mystic Fire Video from Trigon Communications, Inc, New York, 1988 (reissued 1990), also by EMPRESS, Wales, UK, 95 minutes, VHS.
- 1986 commentary, Feng-Shui: The Science of Sacred Landscape in Old China, Ernest J. Eitel, Syngergetic Press ISBN 0-907791-09-3
- 1988 The Dimensions of Paradise: The Proportions and Symbolic Numbers of Ancient Cosmology, London : Thames and Hudson, 1988. ISBN 0-500-01386-1
- 1989 The Traveller's Key to Sacred England , reissued 2006, Gothic Image ISBN 0-906362-63-6
- 1989 Secrets of the Stones: New Revelations of Astro-Archaeology and the Mystical Sciences of Antiquity, Destiny Books, ISBN 0-89281-337-7
- 1989 Earth Spirit: Its Ways, Shrines and Mysteries , Thames and Hudson, ISBN 0-500-81011-7
- 1990 New Light on the Ancient Mystery of Glastonbury, Gothic Image Publications ISBN 0-906362-15-6 (p/b), ISBN 0-906362-14-8 (h/b)
- 1991 Dowsing the Crop Circles, (Editor/Contributor), Gothic Image Publications, ISBN 0-906362-17-2
- 1991 Twelve Tribe Nations and the Science of Enchanting the Landscape, with Christine Rhone, Thames and Hudson, ISBN 0-933999-49-6
- 1994 At the Center of the World: Polar Symbolism Discovered in Celtic, Norse and Other Ritualized Landscapes, Thames and Hudson, ISBN 0-500-01607-0
- 1996 Who Wrote Shakespeare?, Thames and Hudson ISBN 0-500-01700-X
- 2000, with Bob Rickard, Unexplained Phenomena: Mysteries and Curiosities of Science, Folklore and Superstition, Rough Guides, ISBN 1-85828-589-5
- 2000 The Temple at Jerusalem: A Revelation, Samuel Weiser. ISBN 1-57863-199-8, ISBN 978-1-57863-199-5
- 2001 The Dimensions of Paradise: The Proportions and Symbolic Numbers of Ancient Cosmology , Adventures Unlimited, ISBN 0-932813-89-5
- 2002 The Face and the Message: What Do They Mean and Where Are They From?, Gothic Image, ISBN 0-906362-61-X
- 2003 The Traveller's Guide to Sacred England: A Guide to the Legends, Lore and Landscapes of England's Sacred Places, Gothic Image Publications, ISBN 978-0-906362-63-1
- 2003 Prehistoric Sacred Sites of Cornwall, Wessex Books, ISBN 978-1-903035-18-4
- 2005 Confessions of a Radical Traditionalist, Dominion Press, ISBN 0-9712044-4-6
- 2006 "Prehistoric Sacred Sites of Cornwall", Wessex Books, ISBN 978-1-903035-18-4
- 2006 Euphonics: A Poet's Dictionary of Sounds, Wooden Books, ISBN 978-1-904263-43-2
- 2008 Dimensions of Paradise, The Sacred Geometry, Ancient Science and the Heavenly Order on Earth, (revised edition of City of Revelation) Inner Traditions, Bear & Company.
- 2009 How The World Is Made: The Story of Creation According To Sacred Geometry, (with Allan Brown), Thames & Hudson ISBN 0-500-51510-7
- 2009 Sacred Center: The Ancient Art of Locating Sanctuaries, Inner Traditions, ISBN 1-59477-284-3
- 2010 Michellany, A John Michell Reader, ed. Jonangus Mackay, Michellany Editions, London. ISBN 978-0-9566428-0-6
