= Alignments of random points =

Phenomenon in statistics

80 4-point near-alignments of 137 random points

The study of alignments of random points in a plane seeks to discover subsets of points that occupy an approximately straight line within a larger set of points that are randomly placed in a planar region. Studies have shown that such near-alignments occur by chance with greater frequency than one might intuitively expect.

This has been put forward as a demonstration that ley lines and other similar mysterious alignments believed by some to be phenomena of deep significance might exist solely due to chance alone, as opposed to the supernatural or anthropological explanations put forward by their proponents. The topic has also been studied in the fields of computer vision and astronomy.

A number of studies have examined the mathematics of alignment of random points on the plane. In all of these, the width of the line — the allowed displacement of the positions of the points from a perfect straight line — is important. It allows the fact that real-world features are not mathematical points, and that their positions need not line up exactly for them to be considered in alignment. Alfred Watkins, in his classic work on ley lines The Old Straight Track, used the width of a pencil line on a map as the threshold for the tolerance of what might be regarded as an alignment. For example, using a 1 mm pencil line to draw alignments on a 1:50,000 scale Ordnance Survey map, the corresponding width on the ground would be 50 m.

== Estimate of probability of chance alignments ==
Contrary to intuition, finding alignments between randomly placed points on a landscape gets progressively easier as the geographic area to be considered increases. One way of understanding this phenomenon is to see that the increase in the number of possible combinations of sets of points in that area overwhelms the decrease in the probability that any given set of points in that area line up.

One definition which expresses the generally accepted meaning of "alignment" is:

A set of points, chosen from a given set of landmark points, all of which lie within at least one straight path of a given width

More precisely, a path of width w may be defined as the set of all points within a distance of w/2 of a straight line on a plane, or a great circle on a sphere, or in general any geodesic on any other kind of manifold. Note that, in general, any given set of points that are aligned in this way will contain a large number of infinitesimally different straight paths. Therefore, only the existence of at least one straight path is necessary to determine whether a set of points is an alignment. For this reason, it is easier to count the sets of points, rather than the paths themselves. The number of alignments found is very sensitive to the allowed width w, increasing approximately proportionately to w^{k−2}, where k is the number of points in an alignment.

The following is a very approximate order-of-magnitude estimate of the likelihood of alignments, assuming a plane covered with uniformly distributed "significant" points.

Consider a set of n points in a compact area with approximate diameter L and area approximately L^{2}. Consider a valid line to be one where every point is within distance w/2 of the line (that is, lies on a track of width w, where w ≪ L).

Consider all the unordered sets of k points from the n points, of which there are:

$$\binom nk = \frac {n!} {(n-k)!\,k!}$$

(see factorial and binomial coefficient for notation).

To make a rough estimate of the probability that any given subset of k points is approximately collinear in the way defined above, consider the line between the "leftmost" and "rightmost" two points in that subset (for some arbitrary left/right axis: the top and bottom can be chosen for the exceptional vertical case). A straight line can trivially be drawn through those two points. For each of the remaining k-2 points in the subset, the probability that the point is "near enough" to the line is roughly w/L, which can be seen by considering the ratio of the area of the line tolerance zone (roughly wL) and the overall area (roughly L^{2}).

So, based on the approximate estimates above, the expected number of k-point alignments in the overall set can be estimated to be very roughly equal to

$$\frac {n!} {(n-k)!\,k!} \left(\frac{w}{L}\right)^{k-2}$$

Among other things this can be used to show that, contrary to intuition, the number of k-point lines expected from random chance in a plane covered with points at a given density, for a given line width, increases much more than linearly with the size of the area considered, since the combinatorial explosion of growth in the number of possible combinations of points more than makes up for the increase in difficulty of any given combination lining up.

== More precise estimate of expected number of alignments ==
Using a similar, but more careful analysis, a more precise expression for the number of 3-point alignments of maximum width w and maximum length d expected by chance among n points placed randomly on a square of side L can be found as

$$\mu = \frac {\pi } {3} \frac {w}{L}
\left( \frac {d}{L} \right)^3 n (n-1)
(n-2)$$

If d ≈ L and k = 3, it can be seen that this makes the same prediction as the rough estimate above, up to a constant factor.

If edge effects (alignments lost over the boundaries of the square) are included, then the expression becomes

$$\mu = \frac \pi  3 \frac w L
\left( \frac d L \right)^3 n (n-1) (n-2)
\left( 1 - \frac 3 \pi \left( \frac d L \right)
+ \frac 3 5 \left( \frac 4 \pi - 1 \right)
\left( \frac d L \right)^2 \right)$$

A generalisation to k-point alignments (ignoring edge effects) is

$$\mu = \frac {\pi n (n-1) (n-2)
\cdots (n - (k-1)) }
{k (k-2) !} \left( \frac w L \right)^{k-2}
\left( \frac d L \right)^k$$

which has roughly similar asymptotic scaling properties as the crude approximation in the previous section, for the same reason; that combinatorial explosion for large n overwhelms the effects of other variables.

== Computer simulation of alignments ==
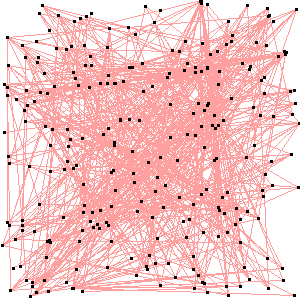
607 4-point alignments of 269 random points

Computer simulations show that points on a plane tend to form alignments similar to those found by ley hunters in numbers consistent with the order-of-magnitude estimates above, suggesting that ley lines may also be generated by chance. This phenomenon occurs regardless of whether the points are generated pseudo-randomly by computer, or from data sets of mundane features such as pizza restaurants or telephone booths.

On a map with a width of tens of kilometers, it is easy to find alignments of 4 to 8 points even in relatively small sets of features with w = 50 m. Choosing larger areas, denser sets of features, or larger values of w makes it easy to find alignments of 20 or more points.

== See also ==
- Apophenia
- Asterism (astronomy)
- Clustering illusion
- Coincidence
- Complete spatial randomness
- General position
- Pattern recognition
- Procrustes analysis
- Ramsey theory, for a notion of "unavoidable coincidences"
- Statistical shape analysis
