= Dodman (disambiguation) =

Dodman is local English vernacular word for a land snail.

Dodman may also refer to:

- Dodman Island, off the west coast of Graham Land, Antarctica
- Dodman Point, headland near Mevagissey, Cornwall, UK
- Michael Dodman (born 1961), American diplomat
