= Herefordshire Pomona =

1878–1884 catalogue of apples and pears

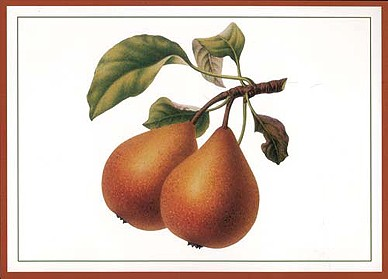
An illustration for a pear variety from the Pomona

The Herefordshire Pomona is a 19th-century catalogue of the apples and pears that were grown in the county of Herefordshire in England. It was one of the first attempts to fully catalogue the existing varieties of English fruit and has been called "a classic of late Victorian natural history". Only 600 copies were ever printed and originals now fetch high prices whenever they are sold.

Over a period of about ten years in the late 19th century, the Pomona Committee of the Woolhope Naturalists' Field Club of Hereford held an annual autumn show featuring the local varieties of apples and pears. The club members were worried that although Herefordshire was famous for its orchards "it was very remarkable that so few of the best varieties of apples should appear in the markets, or the fruit shops". At the behest of the committee, Dr Robert Hogg, at the time Vice-President of the Royal Horticultural Society, author of The Fruit Manual, and editor of the RHS Journal; and local doctor and former president of the Woolhope club, Dr Henry Graves Bull, catalogued and described the fruit displayed at the shows. The descriptions were painstakingly illustrated over a period of eight years by Alice Blanche Ellis and Edith Elizabeth Bull, the latter of whom was Robert's daughter.

The book originally appeared in seven issues, the first part appearing in 1878 and the last in 1884, and included the 441 original watercolours produced by Alice and Edith of the different fruits, buds, blossoms of the cultivars and the blights which attacked them. The hand-coloured lithographs were done by the Belgian firm of G. Severeyns. Once complete the seven parts were collected together and published by Jakeman & Carver as The Herefordshire Pomona Containing Original Figures and Descriptions of the Most Esteemed Kinds of Apples and Pears. 600 copies were published with pebbled green morocco covers, raised bands and gilt decorative panels. They have become highly sought after and originals can command prices of over £10,000, although the book is now available online at the Biodiversity Heritage Library.
