= Henry Graves Bull =

British medical doctor (1818–1885)

Henry Graves Bull (15 January 1818, Northamptonshire – 31 October 1885, Hereford) was a British medical doctor, botanist, mycologist, naturalist, historian, and one of the early presidents of the Woolhope Naturalists' Field Club. He is noteworthy as a mycologist, pomologist, and the co-editor with Robert Hogg of the two-volume work The Herefordshire Pomona, published in seven parts from 1876 to 1885. It contains full descriptions of 423 varieties of apples and pears.

== Medical career ==
Bull began his medical career in 1834 at Northampton General Infirmary. He pursued medical studies at Edinburgh, spent a year at the medical schools of Paris, and then completed his M.D. at Edinburgh. There he won two gold medals for his medical essays and received Sir Charles Bell's prize for surgery. In 1841 he settled in Hereford to practise medicine. He lived in Harley House near Hereford Cathedral. He practised medicine at Hereford Dispensary from 1842 until the week before his death. He was appointed to the staff of the General Infirmary in 1864. He had a large practice and gave advice free of charge to many indigent patients. From 1846 to 1880 he served as Medical Officer to the Hereford Prison.

In the 1840s he was among the first medical doctors in England to use diethyl ether as an anaesthetic. He observed the causal role of contaminated water in cholera.

== Other interests ==
In 1851 Bull was one of the thirty founders of the Woolhope Naturalists' Field Club. In 1867 he established the club's fungus forays. He was for many years the editor-in-chief of the Transactions of the Woolhope Naturalists' Field Club. In 1868 he won the prize for the 'best collections of edible fungi' in a competition organised by the Royal Horticultural Society at the instigation of Miles Berkeley. The prizes were provided by Lady Dorothy Nevill and Mary Lloyd Wynne.

His important book, Herefordshire authored with Robert Hogg, was published on several parts between 1878-84. The illustrations were made by Edith Elizabeth Bull and Alice B. Ellis. It catalogues the apple and pear varieties grown in Herefordshire at that time.

== Personal life ==
In 1854 Bull married Elizabeth Read in St Giles, London. By 1871 they had four sons and four daughters. In Hereford he was very civic-minded and improved Herefordshire's facilities of health and education. Upon his death in 1885 at age 67, he was survived by his widow, two sons, and four daughters.

== Legacy ==
His house in Hereford displays an English Heritage blue plaque. A memorial tablet in Hereford Cathedral records his life and work.

The National Museum of Wales has Bull's botanical and mycological specimens. His letters are at the Natural History Museum, London. The Royal Botanic Gardens, Kew curates his drawings of Hereford fungi.

== Selected publications ==
=== Articles ===
- Bull, H. G. (1844). "Fatal Poisoning from Fifteen or Twenty Drops of the Essential Oil of Bitter Almonds". BMJ. 8 (24): 364–367. doi:10.1136/bmj.s1-8.24.364. PMC 2558517. PMID 20793542.
- Bull, H. G. (1844). "Sir James Graham's Medical Bill. Hereford Meeting". BMJ. 8 (26): 407–408. doi:10.1136/bmj.s1-8.26.407. PMC 2558635. PMID 20793556.
- Bull, H. (1844). "Continence never the cause of spermatorrhea: reply of Dr. Bull to his critics" (PDF). The Lancet. 41 (1062): 479–481. doi:10.1016/S0140-6736(02)26061-4.
- Bull, Henry (1864). "The Mistletoe (Viscum album, L.) in Herefordshire". Journal of Botany. II: 361–385. (See Viscum album.)

=== Books ===
- Hogg, Robert; Bull, Henry Graves, eds. (1876). Herefordshire Pomona. Vol. I. Hereford, [Eng.] Jakeman and Carver.
- Hogg, Robert; Bull, Henry Graves, eds. (1886). The Apple and Pear as Vintage Fruits. Hereford: Jakeman & Carver.
- Bull, Henry Graves, ed. (1888). Notes on the Birds of Herefordshire. London: Hamilton, Adams & Company.
