= Hereford Dispensary =

Coordinates: 52°3′26.2″N 2°42′44.8″W

Hereford Dispensary was founded in 1835 in Hereford, England. In 1837, it was moved to a house on Bye Street (now Commercial Street) in Hereford. It was part of the Dispensary Movement. It was a public dispensary, which gave advice and medicine free-of-charge, or for a small charge. In its first year, it saw 178 patients. By 1839 it had seen 600 patients.

From around 1841, the appointed physician was Henry Graves Bull. He held this post for 40 years.

In 1881, the Dispensary moved to a new location on Union Street. It was built in Classical Italian style.

By 1900, it was seeing over 3,500 patients per year - in addition to those recommended by subscribers - and was reported as being in urgent need of more subscribers. This number declined to just over 3,000 a year by 1910, though the request for more subscribers continued.

By 1946, around 2,000 people were receiving treatment at Hereford Dispensary and three doctors attended the service.

In 2008, the building was converted to a wine bar.
