= Ley line =

Straight alignments between historic structures and landmarks

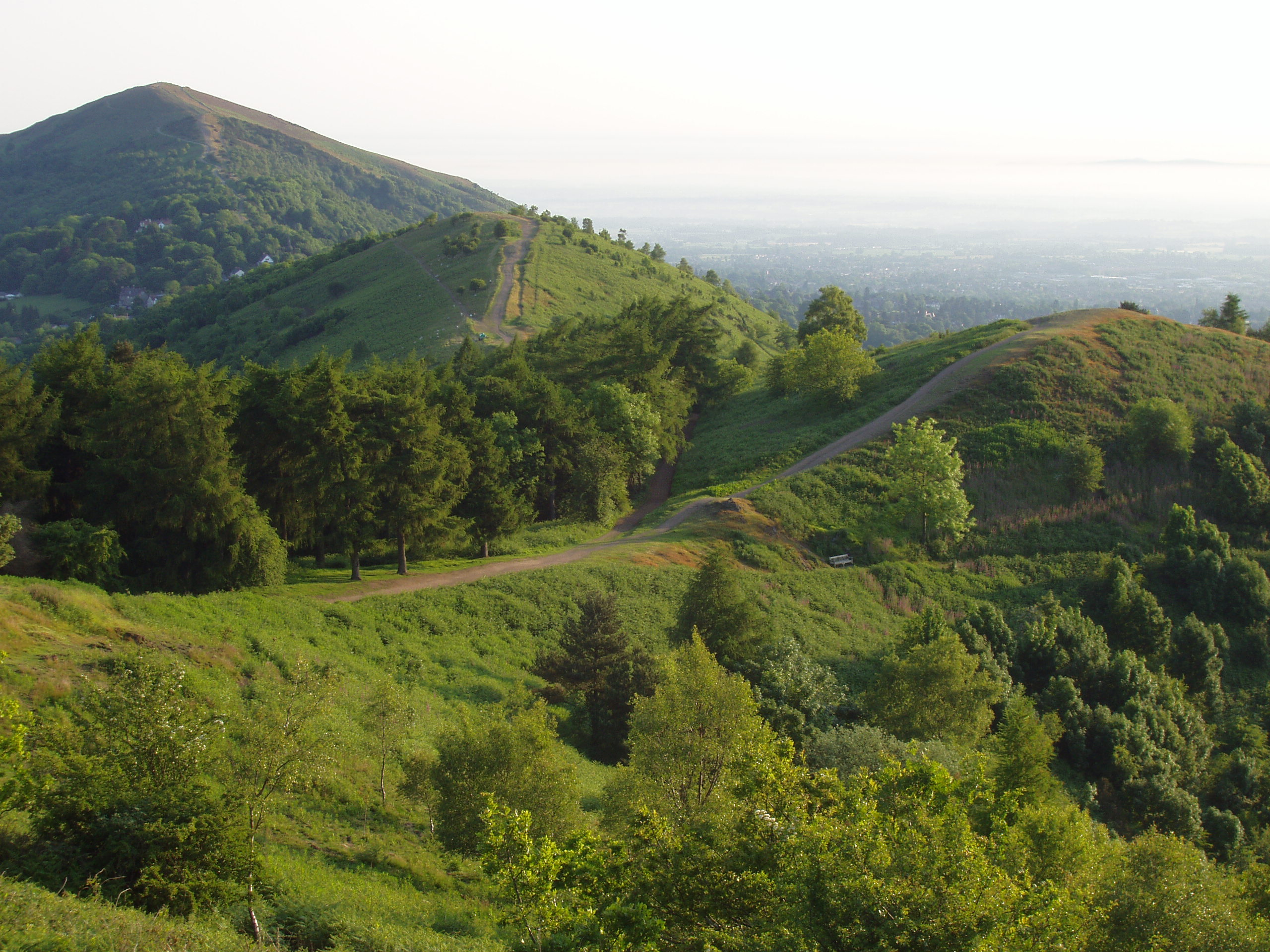
The Malvern Hills in the United Kingdom, said by Alfred Watkins to have a ley line passing along their ridge

Ley lines (/leɪ/ or /liː/) are straight alignments drawn between various historic structures, prehistoric sites, and prominent landmarks. The idea was developed in early 20th-century Europe, with ley line believers arguing that these alignments were recognised by ancient societies that deliberately erected structures along them. Since the 1960s, members of the Earth Mysteries movement and other esoteric traditions have commonly believed that such ley lines demarcate "earth energies" and serve as guides for alien spacecraft. Archaeologists and scientists regard ley lines as an example of pseudoarchaeology and pseudoscience.

The idea of "leys" as straight tracks across the landscape was put forward by the English antiquarian Alfred Watkins in the 1920s, particularly in his book The Old Straight Track. He argued that straight lines could be drawn between various historic structures and that these represented trade routes created by ancient British societies. Although he gained a small following, Watkins's ideas were never accepted by the British archaeological establishment, a fact that frustrated him. His critics noted that his ideas relied on drawing lines between sites established at different periods of the past. They also argued that in prehistory, as in the present, it was impractical to travel in a straight line across hilly or mountainous areas of Britain, rendering his leys unlikely as trade routes. Independently of Watkins' ideas, a similar notion—that of Heilige Linien ('holy lines')—was raised in Germany in the 1920s.

During the 1960s, Watkins' ideas were revived in altered form by British proponents of the countercultural Earth Mysteries movement. In 1961, Tony Wedd put forward the belief that leys were established by prehistoric communities to guide alien spacecraft. This view was promoted to a wider audience in the books of John Michell, particularly his 1969 work The View Over Atlantis. Michell's publications were accompanied by the launch of the Ley Hunter magazine and the appearance of a ley hunter community keen to identify ley lines across the British landscape. Ley hunters often combined their search for ley lines with other esoteric practices like dowsing and numerology and with a belief in a forthcoming Age of Aquarius that would transform human society. Although often hostile to archaeologists, some ley hunters attempted to ascertain scientific evidence for their belief in earth energies at prehistoric sites, evidence they could not obtain. Following sustained archaeological criticism, the ley hunter community dissipated in the 1990s, with several of its key proponents abandoning the idea and moving into the study of landscape archaeology and folkloristics. Belief in ley lines nevertheless remains common among some esoteric religious groups, such as forms of modern Paganism, in both Europe and North America.

Archaeologists note that there is no evidence that ley lines were a recognised phenomenon among ancient European societies and that attempts to draw them typically rely on linking together structures that were built in different historical periods. Archaeologists and statisticians have demonstrated that a random distribution of a sufficient number of points on a plane will inevitably create alignments of random points purely by chance. Skeptics have also stressed that the esoteric idea of earth energies running through ley lines has not been scientifically verified, remaining an article of faith for its believers.

== History ==
=== Early prototypes ===
The idea that ancient sacred sites might have been constructed in alignment with one another was proposed in 1846 by the Reverend Edward Duke, who observed that some prehistoric monuments and medieval churches aligned with each other. In 1909, the idea was advanced in Germany. There, Wilhelm Teudt had argued for the presence of linear alignments connecting various sites but suggested that they had a religious and astronomical function. In Germany, the idea was referred to as Heilige Linien ('holy lines'), an idea adopted by some proponents of Nazism.

=== Alfred Watkins and The Old Straight Track ===
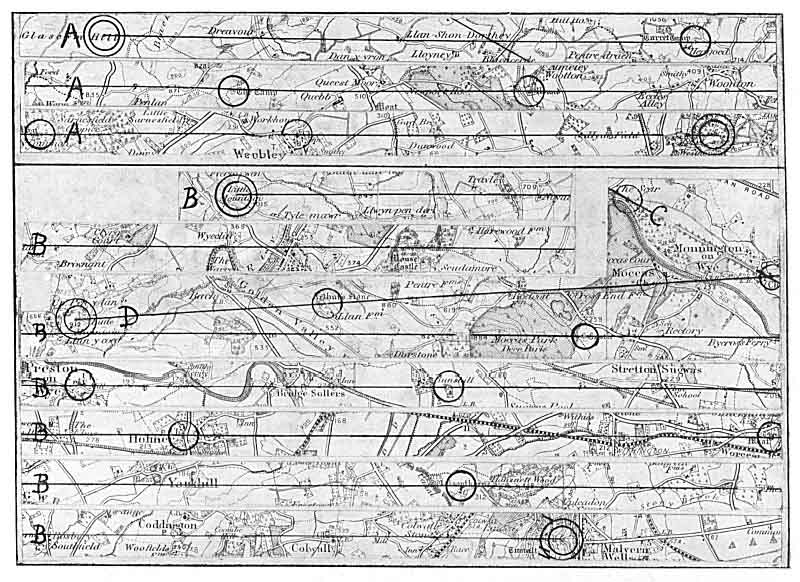
Alfred Watkins' map of two alleged ley lines

The idea of "leys" as paths traversing the British landscape was developed by Alfred Watkins, a wealthy businessman and antiquarian who lived in Hereford. According to his account, he was driving across the hills near Blackwardine, Herefordshire, when he looked across the landscape and observed the way that several features lined up together. He subsequently began drawing lines across his Ordnance Survey maps, developing the view that ancient British people had tended to travel in straight lines, using "mark points" along the landscape to guide them.

He put forward his idea of ley lines in the 1922 book Early British Trackways and then again, in greater depth, in the 1925 book The Old Straight Track. He proposed the existence of a network of completely straight roads that cut through a range of prehistoric, Roman, and medieval structures. In his view, these straight tracks were ancient trade routes. Watkins had drawn upon earlier research; he cited the work of the English astronomer Norman Lockyer, who had argued that ancient alignments might be oriented to sunrise and sunset at solstices.

His work referred to G. H. Piper's paper presented to the Woolhope Naturalists' Field Club in 1882, which noted that: "A line drawn from the Skirrid-fawr mountain northwards to Arthur's Stone would pass over the camp and southernmost point of Hatterall Hill, Oldcastle, Longtown Castle, and Urishay and Snodhill castles."

Watkins referred to these lines as "leys" although had reservations about doing so. The term ley derived from the Old English term for a cleared space, with Watkins adopting it for his lines because he found it to be part of the place-names of various settlements that were along the lines he traced. He also observed the recurrence of "cole" and "dod" in English place-names, thus suggesting that the individuals who established these lines were referred to as a "coleman" or "dodman". He proposed that the Long Man of Wilmington chalk geoglyph in Sussex was a depiction of such an individual with their measuring equipment.

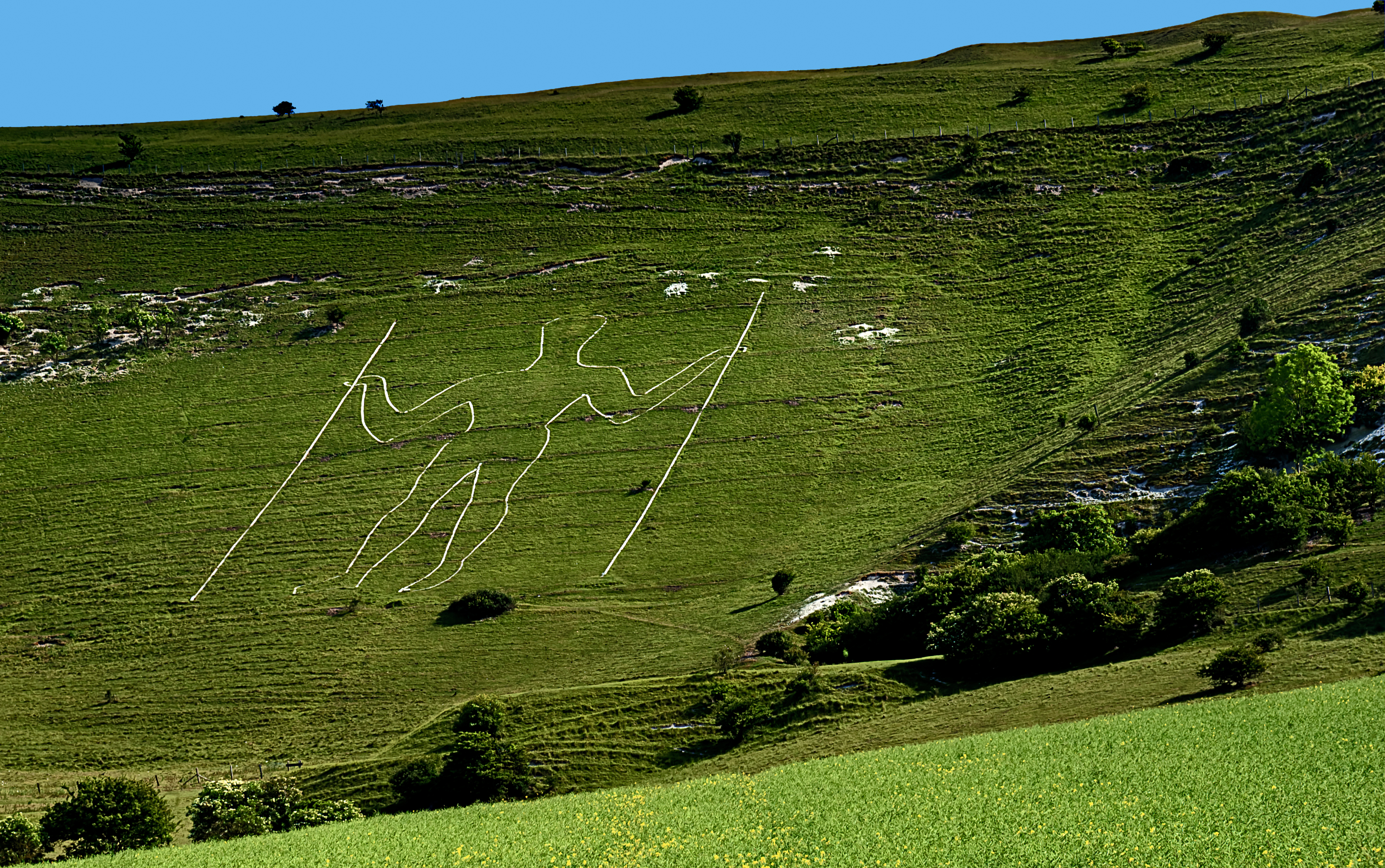
Watkins believed that the Long Man of Wilmington in Sussex depicted a prehistoric "dodman" with his equipment for determining a ley line.

His ideas were rejected by most experts on British prehistory at the time, including both the small number of recognised archaeological scholars and local enthusiasts. His critics noted that the straight lines he proposed would have been highly impractical means of crossing hilly or mountainous terrain, and that many of the sites he selected as evidence for the leys were of disparate historical origins. Some of Watkins' other ideas, such as his belief that widespread forest clearance took place in prehistory rather than later, would nevertheless later be recognised by archaeologists. Part of archaeologists' objections was their belief that prehistoric Britons would not have been sophisticated enough to produce such accurate measurements across the landscape. British archaeologists were then overwhelmingly committed to ideas of cultural diffusionism, and thus unwelcoming to ideas about ley lines being an independent British development.

In 1926, advocates of Watkins' beliefs established the Straight Track Club. To assist this growing body of enthusiasts who were looking for their own ley lines in the landscape, in 1927, Watkins published The Ley Hunter's Manual.

Proponents of Watkins' ideas sent in letters to the archaeologist O. G. S. Crawford, then editor of the Antiquity journal. Crawford filed these letters under a section of his archive titled "Crankeries" and was annoyed that educated people believed such ideas when they were demonstrably incorrect. He refused to publish an advert for The Old Straight Track in Antiquity, at which Watkins became very bitter towards him.

Watkins' last book, Archaic Tracks Around Cambridge, was published in 1932. Watkins died on 7 April 1935. The Club survived him, although it became largely inactive at the outbreak of the Second World War in 1939 and formally disbanded in 1948. The archaeoastronomer Clive Ruggles noted that after the 1920s, "ley lines soon faded into obscurity". The historian Ronald Hutton similarly noted that there had been a "virtual demise" in the idea by the 1950s, in part due to "a natural weariness with a spent enthusiasm".

There was academic work in the following period by e.g. Oxford engineer Alexander Thom that worked on the engineering feasibility of ancient metrology and archeo-astronomy. Thom lent the idea of leys some support; in 1971 he stated the view that Neolithic British engineers would have been capable of surveying a straight line between two points that were otherwise not visible from each other.

=== Earth Mysteries movement ===
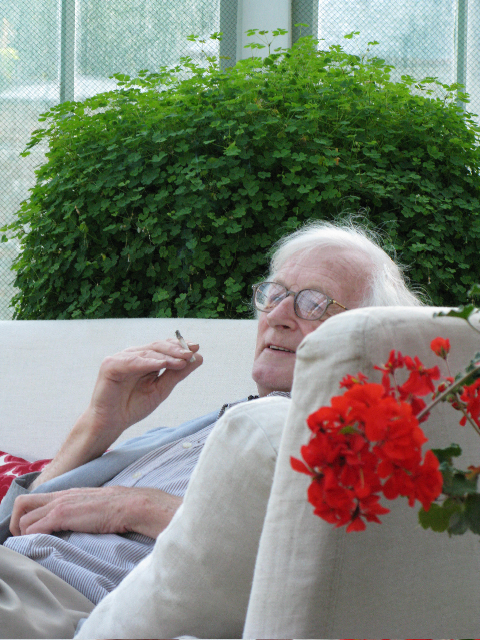
In the 1960s writer John Michell (photographed in 2008) played a major role in promoting a belief in ley lines.

From the 1940s through to the 1960s, the archaeological establishment blossomed in Britain due to the formation of various university courses on the subject. This helped to professionalise the discipline, and meant that it was no longer an amateur-dominated field of research. It was in the latter decade of this period that a belief in ley lines was taken up by members of the counterculture, where—in the words of the archaeologist Matthew Johnson—they were attributed with "sacred significance or mystical power". Ruggles noted that in this period, ley lines came to be conceived as "lines of power, the paths of some form of spiritual force or energy accessible to our ancient ancestors but now lost to narrow-minded twentieth-century scientific thought".

In his 1961 book Skyways and Landmarks, Tony Wedd published his idea that Watkins' leys were both real and served as ancient markers to guide alien spacecraft that were visiting Earth. He came to this conclusion after comparing Watkins' ideas with those of the French ufologist Aimé Michel, who argued for the existence of "orthotenies", lines along which alien spacecraft travelled. Wedd suggested that either spacecraft were following the prehistoric landmarks for guidance or that both the leys and the spacecraft were following a "magnetic current" flowing across the Earth.

Wedd's ideas were taken up by the writer John Michell, who promoted them to a wider audience in his 1967 book The Flying Saucer Vision. In this book, Michell promoted the ancient astronaut belief that extraterrestrials had assisted humanity during prehistory, when humans had worshipped these entities as gods, but that the aliens left when humanity became too materialistic and technology-focused. He also argued that humanity's materialism was driving it to self-destruction, but that this could be prevented by re-activating the ancient centres which would facilitate renewed contact with the aliens.

Michell repeated his beliefs in his 1969 book The View Over Atlantis. Hutton described it as "almost the founding document of the modern earth mysteries movement". Here he interpreted ley lines by reference to the Chinese concept of geomantic energy lines which he transliterated as "lung mei", i.e., "dragon veins" (龙脉; 龍脈; lóngmài; lung^{2}-mai^{4}). He proposed that an advanced ancient society that had once covered much of the world had established ley lines across the landscape to harness this lung mei energy. Translating the term "lung mei" as "dragon paths", he reinterpreted tales from English mythology and folklore in which heroes killed dragons so that the dragon-slayers became the villains. Hutton later noted that Michell's ideas "embodied a fervent religious feeling, which though not Christian was heavily influenced by Christian models", adopting an "evangelical and apocalyptic tone" that announced the coming of an Age of Aquarius in which ancient wisdom would be restored. Michell invented various claims about archaeological evidence to suit his purpose. He viewed archaeologists as antagonists, seeing them as the personification of the modern materialism he was railing against.

In the mid-1970s Michell then published a detailed case study of the West Penwith district of Cornwall, laying out what he believed to be the ley lines in the area. He presented this as a challenge to archaeologists, urging them to examine his ideas in detail and stating that he would donate a large sum of money to charity if they could disprove them. Hutton noted that it represented "the finest piece of surveying work" then undertaken by a pseudo-archaeologists in Britain. However Michell had included natural rock outcrops as well as medieval crosses in his list of Neolithic and Bronze Age monuments.

==== The ley hunting community ====
In 1962, a group of ufologists established the Ley Hunter's Club. Michell's publication was followed by an upsurge in ley hunting as enthusiasts travelled around the British landscape seeking to identify what they believed to be ley lines connecting various historic structures. Parish churches were particularly favoured by the ley hunters, who often worked on the assumption that such churches had almost always been built atop pre-Christian sacred sites. The 1970s and 1980s also saw the increase in publications on the topic of ley lines. One ley lines enthusiast, Philip Heselton, established the Ley Hunter magazine, which was launched in 1965. It was later edited by Paul Screeton, who also wrote the book Quicksilver Heritage, in which he argued that the Neolithic period had seen an idyllic society devoted to spirituality but that this was brought to an end through the introduction of metal technologies in the Bronze Age. He argued that this golden age could nevertheless be restored. Another key book produced among the ley hunting community was Mysterious Britain, written by Janet and Colin Bord.

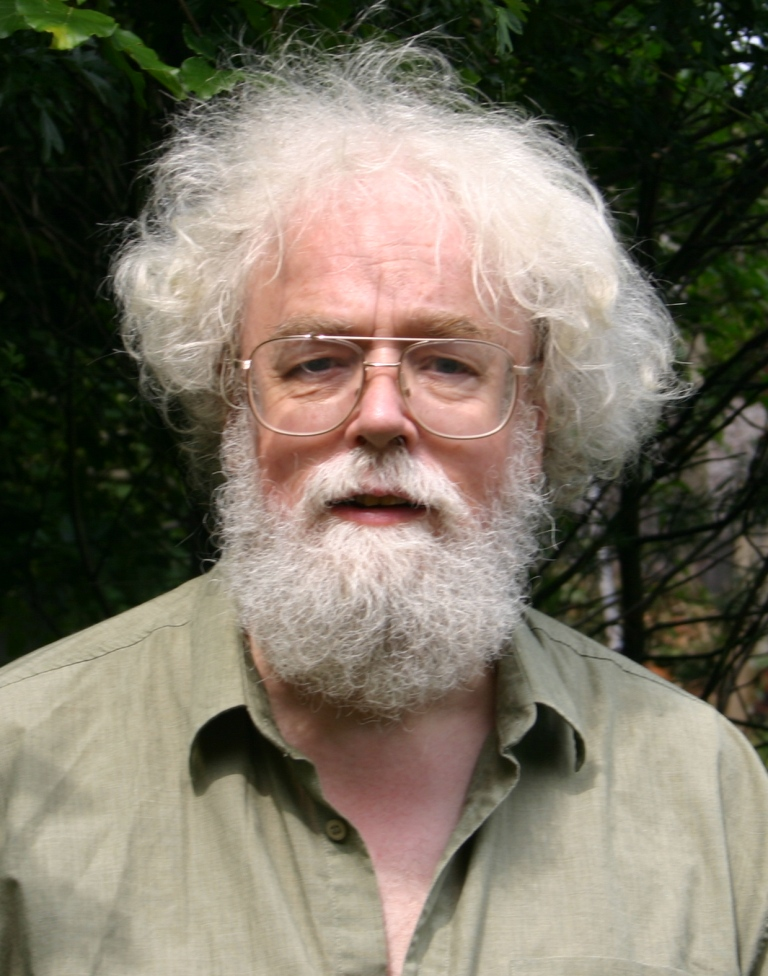
In the 1960s, Philip Heselton (pictured in 2005) established the Ley Hunter magazine.

Part of the popularity of ley hunting was that individuals without any form of professional training in archaeology could take part and feel that they could rediscover "the magical landscapes of the past". Ley hunting welcomed those who had "a strong interest in the past but feel excluded from the narrow confines of orthodox academia". The ley hunting movement often blended their activities with other esoteric practices, such as numerology and dowsing. The movement had a diverse base, consisting of individuals from different classes and of different political opinions: it contained adherents of both radical left and radical right ideologies. Ley hunters often differed on how they understood the ley lines; some believed that leys only marked a pre-existing energy current, whereas others thought that the leys helped to control and direct this energy. They were nevertheless generally in agreement that the ley lines were laid out between 5000 BCE and 2600 BCE, after the introduction of agriculture but before the introduction of metal in Britain. For many ley hunters, this Neolithic period was seen as a golden age in which Britons lived in harmony with the natural environment.

Attitudes to the archaeological establishment varied among ley hunters, with some of the latter wanting to convert archaeologists to their beliefs and others believing that that was an impossible task. Ley hunters nevertheless often took an interest in the work of archaeo-astronomers like Alexander Thom and Euan Mackie, being attracted to their arguments about the existence of sophisticated astronomer-priests in British prehistory. In suggesting that prehistoric Britons were far more advanced in mathematics and astronomy than archaeologists had previously accepted, Thom's work was seen as giving additional credibility to the beliefs of ley hunters.

Paul Devereux succeeded Screeton as the editor of the Ley Hunter. He was more concerned than many other ley hunters with finding objective evidence for the idea that unusual forms of energy could be measured at places where prehistoric communities had erected structures. He was one of the founding members of the Dragon Project, launched in London in 1977 with the purpose of conducting radioactivity and ultrasonic tests at prehistoric sites, particularly the stone circles created in the Late Neolithic and Early Bronze Age. The Dragon Project continued its research throughout the 1980s, finding that certain prehistoric sites did show higher or lower than average rates of radiation but that others did not and that there was no consistent pattern. Professional archaeologists, whose view of the ley hunters was largely negative, took little interest in such research.

It was only in the 1980s that professional archaeologists in Britain began to engage with the ley hunting movement. In 1983, Ley Lines in Question, a book written by the archaeologists Tom Williamson and Liz Bellamy, was published. In this work, Williamson and Bellamy considered and tackled the evidence that ley lines proponents had amassed in support of their beliefs. As part of their book, they examined the example of the West Penwith district that Michell had set out as a challenge to archaeologists during the previous decade. They highlighted that the British landscape was so highly covered in historic monuments that it was statistically unlikely that any straight line could be drawn across the landscape without passing through several such sites. They also demonstrated that ley hunters had often said that certain markers were Neolithic, and thus roughly contemporary with each other, when often they were of widely different dates, such as being Iron Age or medieval. The overall message of Williamson and Bellamy's book was that the idea of leys, as it was being presented by Earth Mysteries proponents, had no basis in empirical reality. Looking back on the book's reception in 2000, Williamson noted that "archaeologists weren't particularly interested, and ley-line people were hostile".

==== Schism in the community ====
From one perspective, the tale of ley-hunting is one of a classic modern religious movement, arising with an apocalyptic language which appropriated some of the tropes of evangelical Christianity, flourished for a brief time, and then subsided into a set of motifs and assumptions retained by a particular subculture of believers. From another, it is a frustrating tale of missed opportunities. The neglect of landscape and sensory experience by mainstream archaeology in the mid twentieth century was indeed a serious omission, which earth mysteries researchers could well have remedied to the lasting benefit of knowledge [...] Misled by a fixed and dogmatic set of ideas, however, they passed this by to focus on an attempted proof of beliefs which were ultimately based on faith alone.

— Historian Ronald Hutton, 2013

Williamson and Bellamy's book brought two different responses from the ley hunter community. Some maintained that even if the presence of earth energies running through ley lines could not be demonstrated with empirical evidence and rational argumentation, this did not matter; for them, a belief in ley lines was an act of faith, and in their view archaeologists were too narrow-minded to comprehend this reality. The other approach was to further engage archaeologists by seeking out new data and arguments to bolster their beliefs in ley lines. Hutton noted that this pulled along "a potential fissure between rationalism and mysticism which had always been inherent in the movement".

In 1989, a book that Devereux had co-written with Nigel Pennick, Lines on the Landscape, was published. It laid aside ideas of leys representing channels for earth energy, noting that this was beyond the realm of scientific verification, and instead focused on trying to build a case for ley lines that archaeologists could engage with. In particular, it drew attention to ethnographically recorded beliefs in the importance of lines running through the landscape in various communities around the world, proposing these as ethnographic comparisons for what might have occurred in prehistoric Britain. Hutton called the book "an important development", for it was "by far the most well-researched, intelligently written and beautifully produced work yet published on leys". Devereux pursued this approach in a series of further books.

Reflecting his move towards archaeology, in 1991, Devereux published an article on sightlines from the prehistoric site of Silbury Hill, Wiltshire in Antiquity. By the 1990s, British archaeology had become more open to ideas about language and cognition, topics that Earth Mysteries enthusiasts had long been interested in. A prominent example of this was the work of Christopher Tilley, who devised the idea of phenomenology, or using human senses to experience a landscape as a means of trying to ascertain how past societies would have done the same.

The Ley Hunter magazine ceased publication in 1999. Its last editor, Danny Sullivan, stated that the idea of leys was "dead". Hutton suggested that some of the enthusiasm formerly directed toward leys was instead directed toward archaeo-astronomy. He also noted that the ley hunting community had "functioned as an indispensable training ground for a small but important group of non-academic scholars who have made a genuine contribution to the study of folklore and mythology." Pennick for instance went on to write a range of short books and pamphlets on European folklore. Another prominent ley hunter, Bob Trubshaw, also wrote several books on these subjects and served as a publisher for others. Jeremy Harte, editor of Wessex Earth Mysteries, subsequently produced several books on folklore; his book on British fairy lore later won the Folklore Society's annual prize.

==== Continuing belief ====
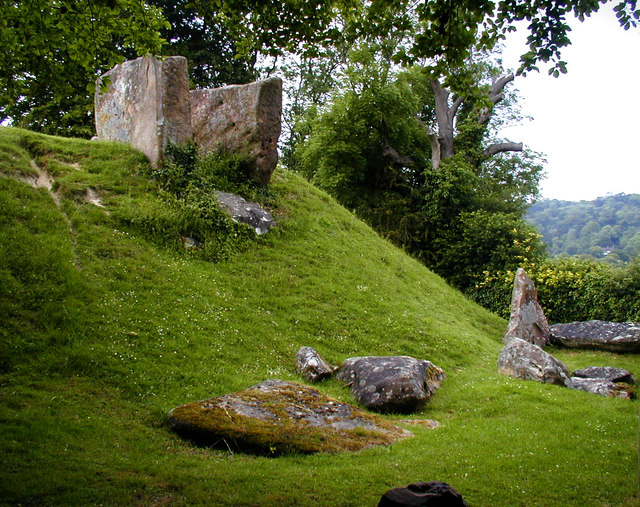
Modern Pagans in Britain often believe in ley lines running through ancient sites, such as the Coldrum Long Barrow in Kent.

In 2005, Ruggles noted that "for the most part, ley lines represent an unhappy episode now consigned to history". However belief in ley lines persists among various esoteric groups, having become an "enduring feature of some brands of esotericism". As Hutton observed, beliefs in "ancient earth energies have passed so far into the religious experience of the 'New Age' counter-culture of Europe and America that it is unlikely that any tests of evidence would bring about an end to belief in them." During the 1970s and 1980s, a belief in ley lines fed into the modern Pagan community. Research that took place in 2014 for instance found that various modern Druids and other Pagans believed that there were ley lines focusing on the Early Neolithic site of Coldrum Long Barrow in Kent, southeast England.

In the US city of Seattle a dowsing organisation called the Geo Group plotted what they believed were the ley lines across the city. They stated that their "project made Seattle the first city on Earth to balance and tune its ley-line system". The Seattle Arts Commission contributed $5,000 to the project, bringing criticisms from members of the public who regarded it as a waste of money.

== Scientific views ==
Ley lines have been characterised as a form of pseudoscience. On The Skeptic's Dictionary, the American philosopher and skeptic Robert Todd Carroll noted that none of the statements about magnetic forces underpinning putative ley lines has been scientifically verified.

Williamson and Bellamy characterised ley lines as "one of the biggest red herrings in the history of popular thought". One criticism of Watkins' ley line theory states that given the high density of historic and prehistoric sites in Britain and other parts of Europe, finding straight lines that "connect" sites is trivial and ascribable to coincidence. Johnson stated that "ley lines do not exist". He cited Williamson and Bellamy's work in demonstrating this, noting that their research showed how "the density of archaeological sites in the British landscape is so great that a line drawn through virtually anywhere will 'clip' a number of sites".

Other statistical significance tests have shown that supposed ley-line alignments are no more significant than random occurrences and/or have been generated by selection effects. The paper by statistician Simon Broadbent is one such example and the discussion after the article involving a large number of other statisticians demonstrates the high level of agreement that alignments have no significance compared to the null hypothesis of random locations.

A study by David George Kendall used the techniques of shape analysis to examine the triangles formed by standing stones to deduce if these were often arranged in straight lines. The shape of a triangle can be represented as a point on the sphere, and the distribution of all shapes can be thought of as a distribution over the sphere. The sample distribution from the standing stones was compared with the theoretical distribution to show that the occurrence of straight lines was no more than average.

The archaeologist Richard Atkinson once demonstrated this by taking the positions of telephone booths and pointing out the existence of "telephone box leys". This, he argued, showed that the mere existence of such lines in a set of points does not prove that the lines are deliberate artefacts, especially since it is known that telephone boxes were not laid out in any such manner or with any such intention.

In 2004, John Bruno Hare wrote:

Watkins never attributed any supernatural significance to leys; he believed that they were simply pathways that had been used for trade or ceremonial purposes, very ancient in origin, possibly dating back to the Neolithic, certainly pre-Roman. His obsession with leys was a natural outgrowth of his interest in landscape photography and love of the British countryside. He was an intensely rational person with an active intellect, and I think he would be a bit disappointed with some of the fringe aspects of ley lines today.

— John Bruno Hare, Early British Trackways Index

== See also ==
- Apophenia – Tendency to perceive connections between unrelated things
- Archaeoastronomy – Interdisciplinary study of astronomies in cultures
- Cursus – Neolithic earthwork
- Earth mysteries – Range of beliefs regarding earthly supernatural phenomena
- Feng shui – Chinese traditional practice
  - Dragon vein (a.k.a. dragon's line/track, 龍脈/龍脉)
- Geoglyph – Motif produced on the ground; observable only from a height
- Geomancy – Method of divination that interprets markings on the ground
- Huaca – Pre-Columbian South American spiritual markers
- Mandala – Spiritual and ritual symbol in Hinduism, Jainism and Buddhism
- Pareidolia – Perception of meaningful patterns or images in random or vague stimuli
- Psychogeography – Creative view of the built environment that emphasizes playfulness and dérive
- Songline – Aboriginal Australian belief and practice
- Telluric current – Natural electric current in the Earth's crust
- Tunnels in popular culture – Appearance of tunnels in media
- Worship of heavenly bodies – Worship of stars and other heavenly bodies as deities
