= William Leigh Williamson Eyre =

British mycologist (1841–1914)

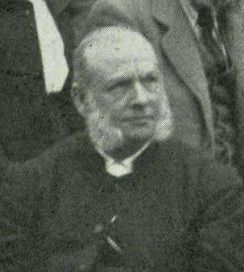
- Rev. William Leigh Williamson Eyre, 1905
- Born: 17 March 1841; Padbury, Buckinghamshire
- Died: 25 October 1914 (aged 73)
- Known for: Contributions to taxonomic mycology
- Scientific career
- Fields: Mycology
- Author abbrev. (botany): Eyre

Reverend William Leigh Williamson Eyre (17 March 1841 – 25 October 1914) was an English mycologist and naturalist.

== Background and education ==
W.L.W. Eyre was born in Padbury, Buckinghamshireto William Thomas Eyre, the local rector; he was educated for the merchant navy and worked as a seaman. His religious convictions led him to enter Lichfield Theological College to study for Holy Orders. He was ordained in 1865 and became curate of a number of English parishes before being appointed, in 1875, rector of Swarraton and vicar of Northington, Hampshire, where he remained for the rest of his life.

Eyre married Caroline Emma Hunt in 1870 and they had one daughter.

== Natural history and mycology ==
Rev. Eyre had a long-standing interest in natural history. He was a member of the Hampshire Field Club and took an interest in local plants, especially species of the genus Rubus, and in land and freshwater molluscs. His botanical and conchological collections were eventually left to Haslemere Museum in Surrey, where they remain today. He also joined the Woolhope Club, as a result of which he developed an expertise in fungi. In 1896 he became a founder member of the British Mycological Society and was elected its president in 1903, when he gave an address on "mycology as an instrument of recreation". Eyre was also a fellow of the Royal Meteorological Society, keeping local weather records, and undertook research into local history, publishing an account of his parish.

His collections of new and interesting fungal species, mostly made in the Swarraton area, were for the most part passed on to and described by contemporary mycologists at the Royal Botanic Gardens, Kew, namely M.C. Cooke, George Massee, and E.M. Wakefield. Eyre published few papers himself (mainly a series on Hampshire fungi for the local Field Club), His collections of fungi are now in the mycological herbarium at the Royal Botanic Gardens, Kew.

== Taxa ==
Eyre named and described the agaric now known as Lepiota grangei (Eyre) Kühner, 1934. He named this species after Grange Park in Northington.

A number of species were named in Eyre's honor, including Melanophyllum eyrei (Massee) Singer, Basidiodendron eyrei (Wakef.) Luck-Allen, and Poria eyrei Bres.

== Selected publications ==
- Eyre, W.L.W. (1887). A list of Hampshire fungi. Papers and proceedings of the Hampshire Field Club 1: 49–50.
- Eyre, W.L.W. (1900). Notes on Hants fungi. Transactions of the British Mycological Society 1: 110–112.
- Eyre, W.L.W. (1900). Fungi. In: Doubleday, H.A. (ed.) Victoria County History of Hampshire and the Isle of Wight. Vol. 1: 82–87. University of London.
- Eyre, W.L.W. (1907). A list of the fungi of Grange Park and neighbourhood, Hampshire. Winchester: Warren & Son.
