= Paul Devereux =

British scholar (born 1945)

Paul Devereux (born 1945) is a British author, researcher, lecturer, broadcaster, artist and photographer based in the UK. Devereux is a co-founder and the managing editor of the academic publication Time & Mind – the Journal of Archaeology, Consciousness and Culture, a research associate with the Royal College of Art (2007–2013), and a Research Fellow with the International Consciousness Research Laboratories (ICRL) group at Princeton University.

Paul Devereux' work primarily deals with archaeological themes, especially archaeoacoustics (the study of sound at archaeological sites), the anthropology of consciousness (ancient and pre-modern worldviews), ecopsychology, unusual geophysical phenomena, and consciousness studies, spanning the range from academic to popular. He has written or co-written 28 books since 1979. He originated two Channel 4 (UK) television documentaries.

== Biography ==
Paul Devereux grew up in Leicester. He painted and studied at the Ravensbourne College of Art and Design in London. With a preference for abstract expressionism, he found increasing inspiration in the geometry and ground plans of ancient sites. He admits to experiencing LSD and mescaline in college, and having at least one profound epiphany under the influence in 1966. He also witnessed, along with all the students on campus, the passage of a UFO in broad daylight in 1967.

Throughout the 1970s, he exhibited his work that a critic described as "a collision between Op art and archaeology". He was also a teacher, eventually teaching an evening class in Kensington called Earth mysteries. Interested in researching the ideas behind ley lines, he took over as editor of The Ley Hunter magazine in 1976.

== Work ==
=== Ley lines ===
Devereux is indelibly associated with "leys", or "ley lines". In 1976, Paul Devereux took over as editor of the magazine The Ley Hunter. His first order was an article on the mystical power of ley lines, but none of the writers could provide concrete documentation on the matter. According to him, Alfred Watkins' alignments "were really just chance alignments of points on maps. This can be demonstrated quite conclusively".

Paul Devereux' work on ley lines was mainly focused on debunking the mystical properties falsely attributed to them. He argues that fake information about ley lines started in 1936 with Dion Fortune's book Goat-Foot God where the author introduced the idea that ley lines have mystic power. He also mentions Aimé Michel's 1958 book, Flying Saucers and the Straight Line Mystery, which stipulates that UFOs followed straight specific lines, an idea that ex-RAF pilot Tony Wedd later linked to Alfred Watkins' The Old Straight Track. This idea then bloomed in the psychedelic movement of the 1960s and became a pillar of the New Age philosophies.

About the Nazca Lines, Paul Devereux argues that they are walking tracks, and that their pattern mainly reveal the religious beliefs of the Kogi Indians around sacred roads. In his 2003 book Fairy Paths & Spirit Roads, Paul Devereux studied many ley lines worldwide and concluded that these linear features are essentially "paths of spirits". He led the Dragon Project for 10 years and admitted that there are places of high radiation where some participants experienced powerful and vivid hallucinatory episodes of spirit-like visits.

=== Dragon Project ===
Devereux is the director of the Dragon Project Trust, which in the past used scientific measuring instruments as well as primary sensing (using dowsers and self-proclaimed psychics) to test modern rumours and traditional folklore of there being "energies" at sacred places. Between 1990 and 2000, it ran an ambitious ancient sites dream research programme (a modern, updated research version of ancient "temple sleep" practices).

=== UFOs ===
Devereux states that he suspects a small percentage of unexplained aerial phenomena are literally unexplained flying objects, their nature currently unknown. He strongly doubts they are extraterrestrial craft but rather exotic natural phenomena – probably some form of plasma with extraordinary properties. He coined the term “earth lights" to label these types of phenomena. Most UFO sighting reports he thinks result from misperceptions of astronomical objects, atmospheric effects such as mirages, or aircraft and other mundane objects, or downright hoaxes. Some reports, he feels, also stem from psycho-social causes. Devereux states that he became interested in unexplained aerial phenomena because of a bizarre sighting of his own in 1967.

Devereux has written three books on the topic, Earth Lights, and, in particular, Earth Lights Revelation, and has co-authored (with Peter Brookesmith) a major work, UFOs and Ufology, and has also written numerous articles on earth lights and given several lectures (including at the Dana Centre, Science Museum, London) on the subject.

=== Archaeoacoustics ===
In 2014, the Landscape and Perception Project led by Paul Devereux led research on the rocks in Stonehenge and concluded they were resonant rocks that work like a giant prehistoric glockenspiel. This theory would explain why the rocks were brought from 200 miles away from the site.

Other research led him to the observation that cairns on burial grounds resonate at 111 Hz (sacred resonance). According to him, Pythagoras created his acoustic scale starting with the sacred 111 Hz resonance.

== Selected bibliography ==
- Sacred Geography: Deciphering Hidden Codes in the Landscape (Gaia 2010) ISBN 978-1-85675-322-7
- Fairy Paths & Spirit Roads: Exploring Otherworldly Routes in the Old and New Worlds (Vega & Sterling, 2003)
- Mysterious Ancient America: An Investigation into the Enigmas of America's Pre-History (Vega & Sterling, 2002)
- Haunted Land: Investigations into Ancient Mysteries and Modern Day Phenomena (Piatkus, 2001)
- The Long Trip: The Prehistory of Psychedelia (Penguin Arkana, 1997)
- Re-visioning the Earth: A Guide to Opening the Healing Channels Between Mind and Nature (Fireside, 1996)
- Earthmind: Communicating With the Living World of Gaia (Destiny, 1992) - with John Steele and David Kubrin
- Earth Lights Revelation: UFOs and Mystery Lightform Phenomena: the Earth's Secret Energy Force (Blandford Press, 1989)
- The Ley Hunter's Companion: Aligned Ancient Sites : A new study with field guide and maps (Thames and Hudson, 1979) ISBN 0-500-01208-3
