= Dodman =

Snail

A dodman (plural "dodmen") or a hoddyman dod is a local English vernacular word for a land snail. The word is used in some of the counties of England. This word is found in the Norfolk dialect, according to the Oxford English Dictionary. Fairfax, in his Bulk and Selvedge (1674), speaks of "a snayl or dodman".

Hodimadod is a similar word for snail that is more commonly used in the Buckinghamshire dialect.

Alternatively (and apparently now more commonly used in the Norfolk dialect) are the closely related words Dodderman or Doddiman. In everyday folklore, these words are popularly said to be derived from the surname of a travelling cloth seller called Dudman, who supposedly had a bent back and carried a large roll of cloth on his back. The words to dodder, doddery, doddering, meaning to progress in an unsteady manner, are popularly said to have the same derivation.

A traditional Norfolk rhyme goes as follows:

"Doddiman, doddiman, put out your horn,

Here comes a thief to steal your corn."

Alfred Watkins, the 'inventor' of ley lines, thought that in the words "dodman" and the builder's "hod" there was a survival of an ancient British term for a surveyor. Watkins felt that the name came about because the snail's two horns resembled a surveyor's two surveying rods. Watkins also supported this idea with an etymology from 'doddering along' and 'dodge' (akin, in his mind, to the series of actions a surveyor would carry out in moving his rod back and forth until it accurately lined up with another one as a backsight or foresight) and the Welsh verb 'dodi' meaning to lay or place. He thus decided that The Long Man of Wilmington was an image of an ancient surveyor.
