= Dragon vein =

Concept in feng shui

The dragon vein (simplified Chinese: 龍脈; traditional Chinese: 龙脉) is a metaphor for illustrating the winding terrain and the geographic formulations that promote the accumulation of qi.
