= The Old Straight Track =

1925 book by Alfred Watkins

The Old Straight Track: Its Mounds, Beacons, Moats, Sites and Mark Stones
- Title page for The Old Straight Track: Its Mounds, Beacons, Moats, Sites and Mark Stones (1948)
- Author: Alfred Watkins
- Language: English
- Publication date: 1925
- Publication place: United Kingdom

The Old Straight Track: Its Mounds, Beacons, Moats, Sites and Mark Stones is a book by Alfred Watkins, first published in 1925, describing the existence of alleged ley lines in Great Britain.

== Presentation ==
Watkins presents a methodical and thorough exposition of his theories of ley lines, following an earlier much shorter publication, "Early British Trackways" (1922). The book has a preface, thirty chapters, four appendices and an index. There are many figures, and photographs taken by the author.

The book is considered the first book written about leys, and the first book to document and map alleged ley lines in Britain, primarily southern England. According to a review in The Geographical Journal of the Royal Geographical Society, Watkins sought to prove that "mounds, moats, beacons and markstones fall into straight tracks, i.e. sighted lines, throughout Britain, with fragmentary evidence of trackways on the alignments."

The book was disregarded by archaeologists but saw a resurgence of interest with the rise of New Age ideas in the 1960s. Watkins' ideas also influenced contemporary psychogeography, including Iain Sinclair's Lud Heat (1975), which in turn influenced Peter Ackroyd's novel Hawksmoor (1985).

== Criticism ==
Watkins' work met with early scepticism from archaeologists, one of whom, O. G. S. Crawford, refused to accept advertisements for The Old Straight Track in the journal Antiquity.

One criticism of Watkins' ley line theory states that given the high density of historic and prehistoric sites in Britain and other parts of Europe, finding straight lines that "connect" sites is trivial and ascribable to coincidence. A statistical analysis of lines concluded: "the density of archaeological sites in the British landscape is so great that a line drawn through virtually anywhere will 'clip' a number of sites."

== Reprints ==
The book was reprinted as ISBN 0-349-13707-2 on April 2, 1994 by "Abacus". Editions or reprints were published in 1925, 1933, 1945, 1948, 1970, 1974 and 1994. The Abacus edition of 1970 was reprinted up to 1999 at least, and carries a copyright dated 1970 "Allen Watkins and Marion Watkins".

== See also ==
- Alignments of random points
- Earth mysteries
- Nazca Lines
- Position lines
- Ley lines
