= Blackwardine =

Village in Herefordshire, England

Coordinates: 52.205450°N 2.6852775°W

Blackwardine is a village in Herefordshire, England (at grid reference SO529564), in the parish of Ford and Stoke Prior.

It is the site of a Romano-British settlement known as Black Caer Dun. A golden bracelet and ring have been found here, as well as many human remains. An 1885 account notes that "broken pieces of pottery were thickly scattered about and in one part of the railway cutting near the surface some 40 or 50 yards (46 m) of charred material 18 inches thick were observed."

Blackwardine is where Alfred Watkins first developed his theory of Ley lines on 30 June 1921. The place was excavated the same year.
