= Woolhope =

Village in Herefordshire, England

Coordinates: 52°01′N 2°34′W

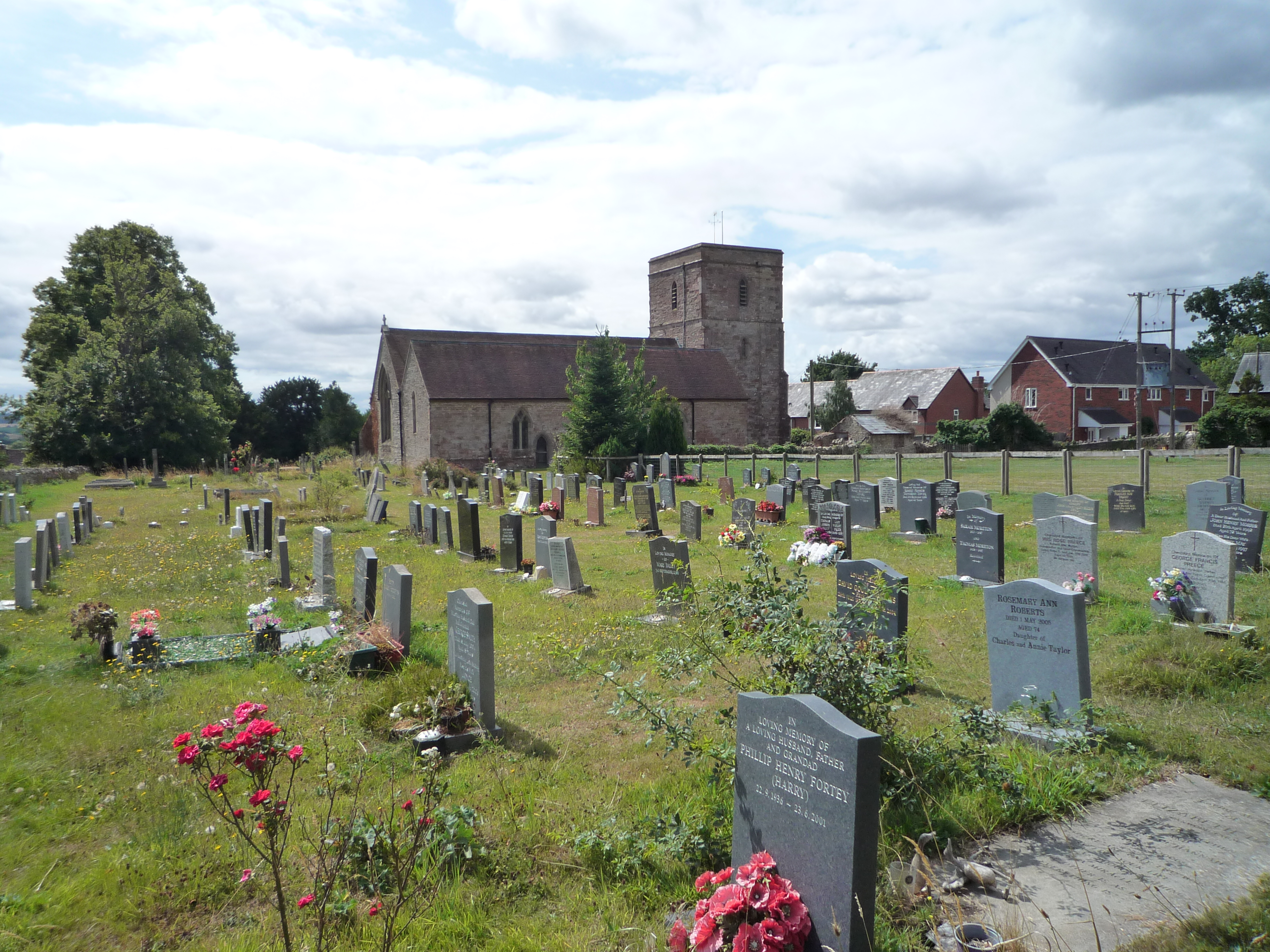
- Churchyard at St George's

- Location within Herefordshire
- Population: 486 (2011 Census)
- OS grid reference: SO612357
- Civil parish: Woolhope
- Unitary authority: Herefordshire
- Shire county: Herefordshire
- Region: West Midlands
- Country: England
- Sovereign state: United Kingdom
- Post town: Hereford
- Postcode district: HR1
- Police: West Mercia
- Fire: Hereford and Worcester
- Ambulance: West Midlands
- UK Parliament: Hereford and South Herefordshire

Woolhope is a village and civil parish in the English county of Herefordshire. The population of the civil parish was 486 at the 2011 census. The civil parish includes the hamlet of Broadmoor Common to the west of the village (and a nature reserve of the same name), and a locale known as The Nurdens also known as Upper Woolhope to its northeast.

== Location ==
Woolhope is located about 7 miles east of Hereford, sat atop the 'Woolhope Dome', a region of particular geological interest; and near Haugh Wood, a Site of Special Scientific Interest due to its varied flora and fauna.

== Toponymy ==
The name of the village comes from Wulviva's Hope (Wulviva's Valley).

== History ==
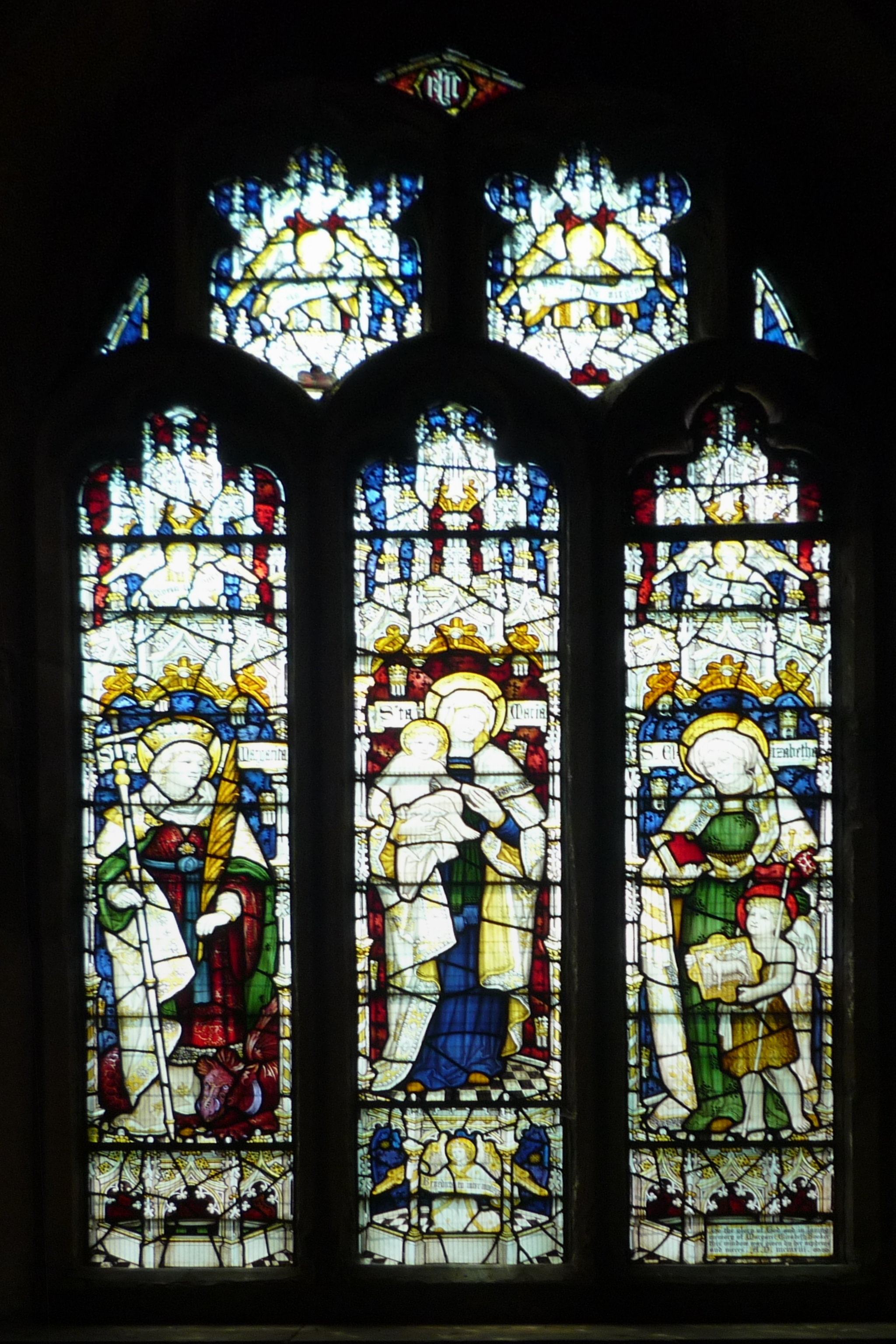
Stained glass

The manor of Woolhope in Herefordshire, along with three others, was given to the cathedral at Hereford before the Norman Conquest by the benefactresses Wulviva and (Lady) Godiva, local Anglo-Saxon landowners before the Norman takeover of the region. The church has a 20th-century stained-glass window showing them.

== Amenities ==
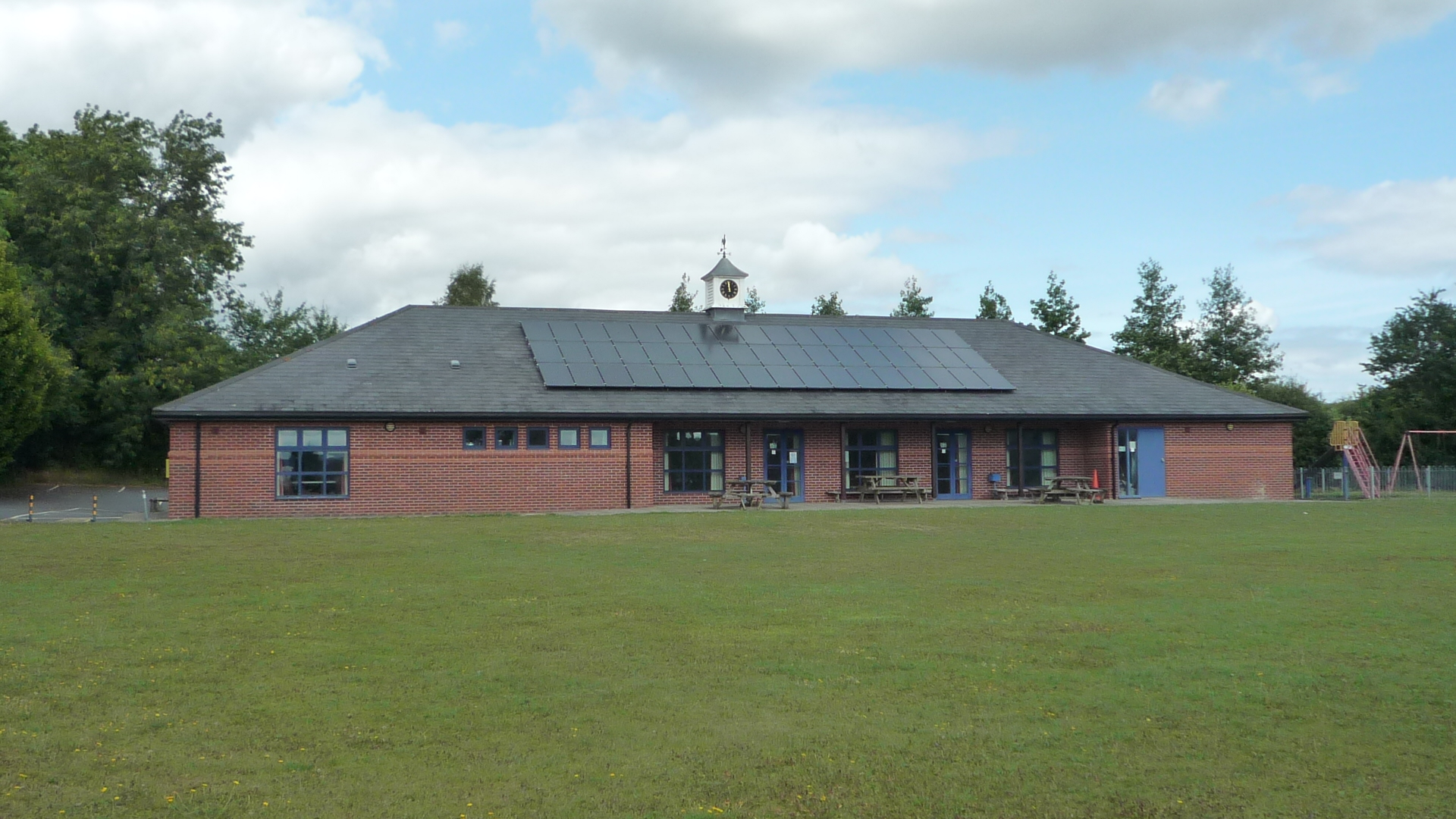
Village Hall

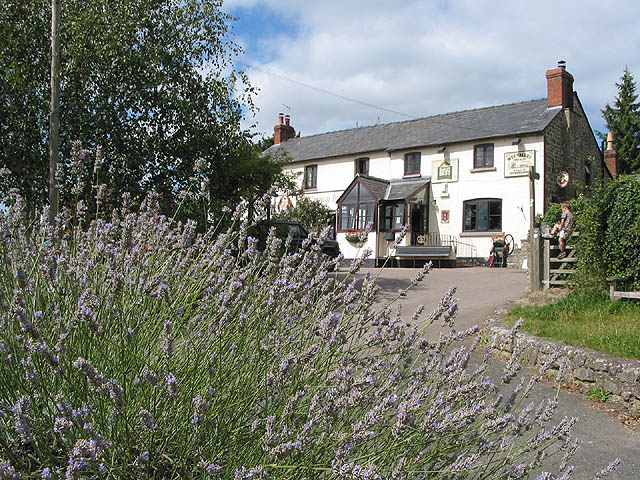
The Crown Inn

The village boasts a community hall, which was rebuilt at its present site at the turn of the millennium. The hall now stands at the North end of the playing field (which includes a cricket pitch in summer and football pitch in winter). Called 'Berryfield', the playing field was originally part of the churchyard, and takes its name from 'Bury Field'. The village also has an extremely small green, a patch of tended lawn and flowerbed of no more than 400 ft^{2}.

== Recreation ==
Woolhope has a football team called Woolhope Allstars FC. They play at the Berryfield, which is the smallest pitch in the league.

Woolhope has a cricket team called Woolhope Cricket Club. They also play at the Berryfield.

Woolhope is also home to Woolhope Amateur Dramatics Society, or 'WADS', a popular theatre group which stages, on average, two shows per year, typically a pantomime in the winter, and an adult comedy in summer.

== Famous inhabitants ==
The area was a retreat of late TV writer John Sullivan, whose works included Only Fools and Horses and The Green Green Grass, and of musician Roger Whittaker, who previously inhabited one half of the Wessington Court estate house. Woolhope is currently home to Liberty Bee Miles who is a multiple (Junior) British, UK, European and World Brazilian jiu-jitsu champion. She currently studies Medicine at Edinburgh University.

== See also ==
- Woolhope Naturalists' Field Club
