= Robert Hogg (biologist) =

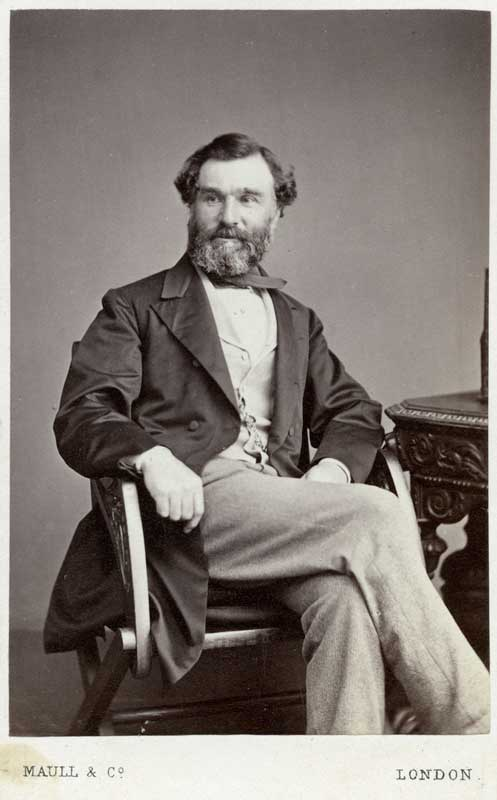
In 1866

Robert Hogg (20 April 1818 – 14 March 1897) was a Scottish nurseryman, pomologist and botanist. He published his book British Pomology in 1851, and co-edited The Florist and Pomologist: A Pictorial Monthly Magazine of Flowers, Fruits and General Horticulture.

== Life and work ==
Hogg was born in Duns, Berwickshire, the son of Grace née Wilson and a namesake father who ran a nursery business in Coldstream. He studied at a private school before taking up medicine at Edinburgh University. He did not follow a medical career and instead apprenticed with the nursery firm of Peter Lawson & Son. He also travelled through Europe examining fruit cultivation. In 1836 he joined the Brentford nursery where one of the partners Hugh Ronalds had worked on apple varieties. He joined the Brompton Park nursery in 1845.

He published on apples in his book British Pomology (1851) and in 1854 was a founder member of the British Pomological Society. He introduced a system for the classification of apple varieties and examined suitability for cultivation. This was dedicated to Robert Thompson (1798–1869) who was replaced in 1860 by Thompson in the fruit committee of the Horticultural Society. Hogg joined George William Johnson to edit the Cottage Gardener. In 1861 this was renamed as the Journal of Horticulture and after the death of Johnson in 1886, he took full ownership of the journal. With Johnson he compiled the Wild Flowers of Great Britain (1862-80). In 1861 he was elected to the Linnean Society as a fellow and he also received an LLD after which he was referred to as Dr Hogg. Hogg was a member of the Royal Horticultural Society where he sought practicing gardeners to govern it rather than high society members. He became its honorary secretary in 1875. He was recruited to improve fruit growing in Herefordshire by Charles Henry Bulmer who was in the cider business. Here he collaborated with physician Henry Graves Bull to produce the Fruit manual in 1860 which went into five editions. In 1880, a variety of apple was distributed by W. Paul & Sons., Herefordshire, that was named "Doctor Hogg".

Hogg married Caroline Amelia (1821–1905), daughter of corn businessman Charles Milligan in 1844. Hogg died on 14 March 1897 in Pimlico, London and was buried at Brookwood cemetery, Woking. A Hogg medal was established in his memory in 1898 by the Royal Horticultural Society.
