= Alfred Watkins =

English photographer, author (1855–1935)

- Alfred Watkins
- Born: 27 January 1855; Imperial Hotel in Widemarsh Street, Hereford, England
- Died: 15 April 1935 (aged 80)
- Occupations: Photographer, author
- Known for: Ley lines, The Old Straight Track
- Spouse: Marion Mendham Cross
- Children: Allen, Marion
- Parent(s): Charles Watkins, Ann Watkins

Alfred Watkins (27 January 1855 – 15 April 1935) was an English businessman and amateur archaeologist who developed the idea of ley lines.

== Life ==
Watkins was born in Hereford to an affluent family which had moved to the town in 1820 to establish several businesses including a flour-mill, a hotel and brewery. Watkins travelled across Herefordshire as an 'out-rider' representing the family businesses and so got to know the area intimately.

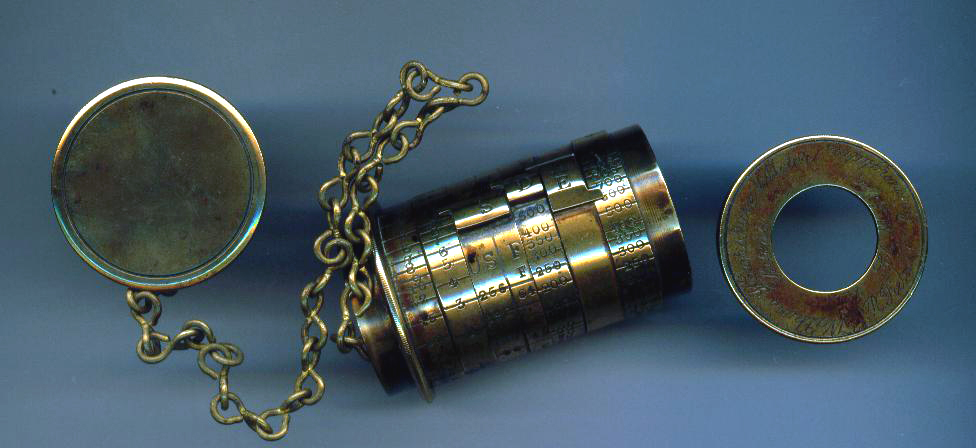
Watkins Exposure Meter with timing chain, manufactured by R Fields & Co, Birmingham. Note: this is not the later, pocket-watch shaped, Watkins Bee Meter. Photo: Tony French

Watkins was also a respected photographer. He made some cameras himself and manufactured an exposure meter called the Watkins Bee Meter due to its small size and efficiency. An example is in the Museum Resource & Learning Centre in Hereford. Frank Hurley used Bee Meters while he was expedition photographer on the Australian explorer Douglas Mawson's Australasian Antarctic Expedition, which departed in 1911 and returned in 1914. Hurley also used Bee Meters on Sir Ernest Shackleton's Imperial Trans-Antarctic Expedition which set out in 1914. The meters sank with the ship Endurance. Another accompanied Herbert Ponting and Robert Falcon Scott to the South Pole in 1910.

Watkins was active in the Photographic Convention of the United Kingdom and served as its president when it was held in Hereford in 1907. In 1910 he was awarded the Progress Medal of the Royal Photographic Society (RPS). Instituted in 1878, the medal honours any invention, research, publication or other contribution resulting in an important advance in the scientific or technological development of photography or imaging in the widest sense. It also carries with it Honorary Fellowship of the society. Over 3,000 photographs, taken from Alfred's original glass negative plates are held by Hereford Library.

In photography, Watkins began with a primitive pinhole camera made from a cigar box. He devised an "exposure meter" after exploring the mathematical relations of light, lens size and exposure period. He published findings in the April 1890 edition of the British Journal of Photography and patented his exposure meter. The Watkins Meter Company was active for over 40 years and exported all over the world. The device contributed much to photography's emergence as a mass-market art form. His Watkins Manual of Exposure and Development (1900), ran to eleven editions.

On 30 June 1921, Watkins visited Blackwardine in Herefordshire and had the idea that there was a system of straight lines crossing the landscape dating from Neolithic times. He presented his ideas at a meeting of the Woolhope Naturalists' Field Club of Hereford in September 1921, and published his first books Early British Trackways in 1922 and The Old Straight Track in 1925. Thereafter he spent a major part of his life developing his theory. He published a further book on leys and participated in the Old Straight Track Club from 1927 to 1935. (Its papers are also in the Hereford City Museum.)

Watkins was a member of the Society for the Protection of Ancient Buildings, an authority on beekeeping and a fellow of the Royal Photographic Society. He was also involved in the preservation of Pembridge Market Hall in Herefordshire.

== Legacy ==
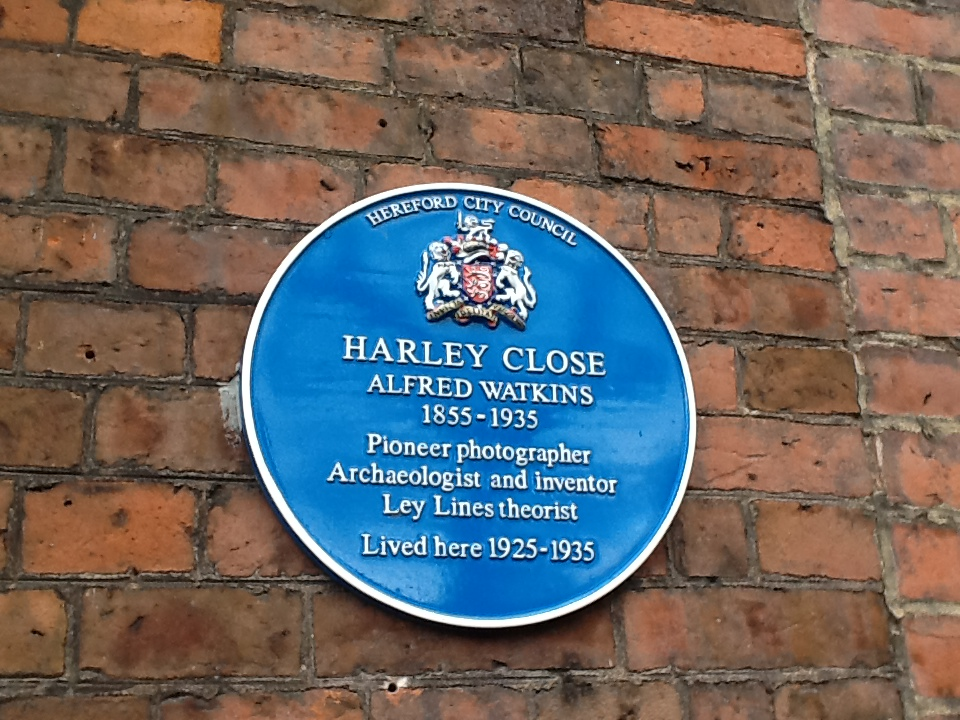
A blue plaque marking Watkins' home at Hereford, Herefordshire

Archaeologists and physical Geographers, in general, do not accept Watkins' ideas on leys. At first they regarded the ancient Britons as too primitive to have devised such an arrangement, but this is no longer the argument used against the existence of leys. More crucially, there are so many ancient features that finding some in approximate alignment is highly likely (for example, see and discussion after article). (See also ley lines). Watkins was sensitive to such arguments and argued for caution. He also drew up a list according to which landscape features could be given values between 1/4 and 1 point, five points or more being required as evidence of a ley.

Watkins' work resurfaced in popularised form from the 1960s following the publication of John Michell's book The View over Atlantis in 1969. Michell merged Watkins' ideas with mystical concepts not present in Watkins' own work. In 2004, John Bruno Hare of the Internet Sacred Texts Archive (ISTA) wrote:

Watkins never attributed any supernatural significance to leys; he believed that they were simply pathways that had been used for trade or ceremonial purposes, very ancient in origin, possibly dating back to the Neolithic, certainly pre-Roman. .. He was an intensely rational person with an active intellect, and I think he would be a bit disappointed with some of the fringe aspects of ley lines today.

— John Bruno Hare, 17 June 2004

In 2002 Watkins had a beer named after him, "Watkins' Triumph", brewed by Wye Valley Brewery Ltd.

=== Books by Alfred Watkins ===
- Early British Trackways, Moats, Mounds, Camps and Sites, Simpkin, Marshall, Hamilton, Kent & Co. (London); The Watkins Meter (Hereford), 1922
- The Old Straight Track: its mounds, beacons, moats, sites, and mark stones, 1925
- The Ley Hunter's Manual, 1927
- Alfred Watkins's Herefordshire in his own Words and Photographs, Logaston Press, 14 November 2012. A previously unpublished manuscript, written in 1931
