= Hay Bridge =

Hay Bridge may refer to:

- Sennoy Bridge, Saint Petersburg, Russia
- Hay-on-Wye Bridge, Powys, Wales
- Hay's bridge an electric circuit for measurement.
- Hay Bridge, a bridge over the Murrumbidgee River at Hay, N.S.W., Australia; both the modern concrete bridge and the former iron-lattice swing bridge (1873 to 1973).
