= Clifford Castle =

Ruined castle in Herefordshire, England

- Clifford, Herefordshire
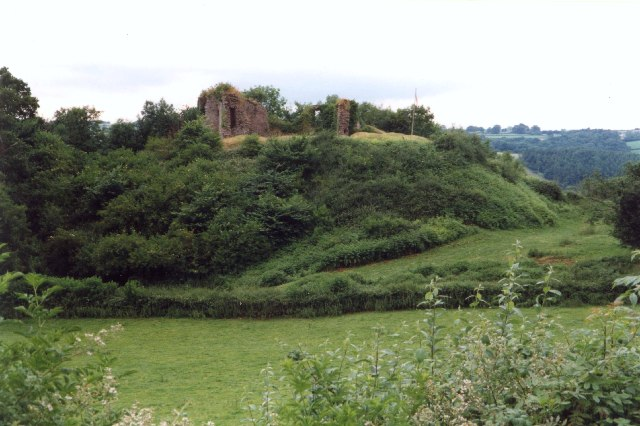
- Ruins of Clifford Castle

Site information
- Type: Castle
- Owner: Private
- Open to the public: On certain days published on the Clifford Castle website www.cliffordcastle.org
- Condition: Ruined

Location
- Coordinates: 52.10443°N 3.10666°W

Site history
- Demolished: 15th century (mostly)

Clifford Castle is a ruined castle in the village of Clifford which lies 2.5 miles to the north-east of Hay-on-Wye in the Wye Valley in Herefordshire, England (grid reference SO243457). It was the caput of the feudal barony of Clifford, a Marcher Lordship (owing allegiance directly to the king, but separate from the rest of the kingdom). The castle stands in the grounds of a private house and is only open to the public on certain days of the year.

== History ==
The early motte-and-bailey castle was built on a cliff overlooking a ford on the River Wye in 1070 by William FitzOsbern, 1st Earl of Hereford, on a wasteland formerly occupied by Browning. The castle was intended to provide protection for a planned Norman settlement above the River Wye of quite a substantial size, with around 200 plots being intended, running uphill for half a mile towards Llanfair, where the church was sited on the hilltop. St Mary's church remains today, much altered in the Victorian era. The position of the castle as adjacent to the River Wye enabled the seasonal flooding of the river to fill the flood plain around the castle, forming a shallow lake or marsh with the assistance of a dam on the western or upstream side of the site, acting as a further form of defence.

After FitzOsbern was slain in battle at Flanders, the castle passed to his son, Roger de Breteuil, 2nd Earl of Hereford. Roger forfeited his lands for rebellion against the king in 1075, and the castle was granted to Ralph Tosny who held it directly from the Crown, and it was the Tosnys who rebuilt the castle in stone (in a manner much resembling the Tosnys' Conches Castle in Normandy). As the bulk of Ralph's time was spent in Normandy, the castle was rented to Gilbert, Sheriff of Hereford for 60 shillings.

After the marriage of Ralph's daughter, Margaret de Tosny, to Walter Fitz Richard, Walter became steward of the lands and estate, later claiming them for himself and taking the name of Walter de Clifford sometime before 1162. It was Walter's daughter, Rosamund Clifford (known for her beauty as the Fair Rosamund), who became famous as the mistress of Henry II, which she remained until her death in 1176 or 1177 when she was buried at Godstow in Oxfordshire. A property near the castle is called Rosamund House today, and one of the surviving towers is known as "Rosamund's Tower".

In 1233 Walter's grandson, Walter de Clifford (died 1263), rebelled against the autocratic rule of King Henry III. In early September the king came and besieged Clifford Castle, forcing the garrison to surrender after just a few days. Walter Clifford then made his peace with the Crown and led his troops against Prince Llywelyn ab Iorwerth, his father-in-law. Walter's volte-face was doubly dishonourable, as Prince Llywelyn had just entered the field to fight the king in support of Walter. Twenty years later Walter nearly rebelled again, when, in a fit of anger, he forced a royal messenger to eat a royal writ, together with the royal wax seal the size of a dinner plate. For this, Walter lost many of his Marcher Lord privileges.

Walter had no male heir and so Clifford fell to his daughter, Matilda Clifford (widow of the Earl of Salisbury's grandson), some time in the 1260s. It was during the Second Barons' War when John Giffard of Brimpsfield took the castle, whereupon he kidnapped, raped and forcibly married Matilda. Though Giffard was fined, Matilda declined any further action and chose to accept her erstwhile abductor as her husband, and they lived together in the Clifford estate until Giffard's death in 1299, whereupon the king granted Clifford to the Mortimers of Wigmore.

== Ruination ==
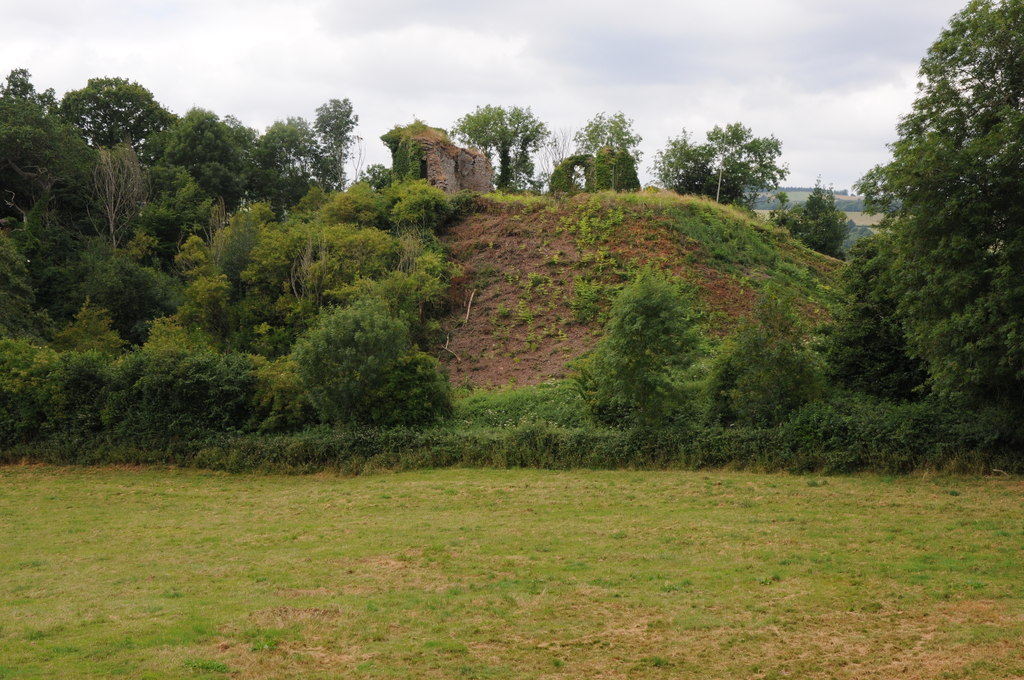
Motte, with ruins in the background

After the Welsh had been successfully conquered, Clifford Castle diminished in value considerably, and was allowed to deteriorate. Though the castle was garrisoned against the rebellion of Owain Glyndŵr in 1402, it saw no further use. The damage it received during the uprising was left unrepaired, and the castle was abandoned and allowed to fall into ruin, with much of the stone pillaged for the older properties seen in the village today; large dressed stone blocks can be seen in numerous garden walls.

== Excavations ==
=== 1920s ===
O. Trumper, the then-owner of the site, carried out a series of excavations between 1925 and 1928, which were successful in revealing the bases of twin towers either side of the castle entrance, and a large building (containing an annexe and bailey) to the east of the castle. Evidence was also discovered for a southern tower, guardroom and portcullis, alongside a section of the curtain wall. Findings from the excavations of this period unrelated to the castle included a boar's tusk, wolf vertebra and a Roman brooch.

=== 1950s ===
Between 1950 and 1953 a further series of excavations were embarked on, discoveries from which included the foundations of a tower on the motte, alongside further sections of curtain wall. A complete excavation of the barbican was undertaken, and evidence of a roadway uncovered. Findings from these excavations included pottery and iron, arrowheads, a knife, a bullet mould, a key, iron nails and a bridle bit.

== Modern ruin ==
The castle is no longer on the English Heritage – Heritage at Risk Register. The present owners have worked closely with English Heritage to implement a program of works to stabilise the current structure and prevent further decay. This work has now been completed and images can be seen at cliffordcastle.org

Clifford castle now consists of a great motte as constructed by the men of William FitzOsbern in the late 1060s. This was later sub-divided and the eastern part was crowned by an ovoid shell keep with five D-shaped towers in its circuit. Its north wall appears to overlie part of William FitzOsbern's original hall. To the east of the motte is the castle bailey. Most of the walls of this structure have disappeared, but centrally are the remains of a great twin-towered gatehouse probably of the mid-thirteenth century. To the west of the castle is a broken earthwork dam which would have flooded the valley to the south of the castle. With the River Wye to the north, the fortress would have been surrounded by water on all sides except for the east. As such it would have been a very difficult fortress to take by storm. Clifford Castle is within the grounds of a family home and has limited public access on dates published on the Clifford Castle website.

A branch of Great Western Railway ran just to the north of the castle, between the castle and the river. The next station to the north on this line was nearby in Clifford, and the next station to the south was Hay-on-Wye railway station. This station was also the terminus of the Great Western line—beyond the station the line was the Golden Valley Railway. The Great Western named one of its Castle-class locomotives after Clifford Castle. Locomotive 5071 was built in June 1938, but in September 1940 it was renamed Spitfire. In May 1946, a new build locomotive, 5098, was named after the castle.
