= Dulas Bridge =

Bridge on Dulas Brook, Wales

Coordinates: 52.0779°N 3.1241°W

Dulas Bridge spans Dulas Brook, a tributary of the River Wye in Hay-on-Wye, Powys, Wales.

The Dulas bridge, near Hay station, was a joint counties bridge—Brecknock and Radnor. Those counties refused to widen the bridge to correspond with the improvements of the local board, and the chairman of the local board (F. R. Trumper) undertook and succeeded in raising the money for doing the work by public subscription. The rebuild was completed in 1884.

In 1839, the Dulas Bridge was described as having one arch.

== Bibliography ==
- Clark, J. (1839). A pocket guide through Monmouthshire ... Second edition (Public domain ed.). J. Clark.
- Lewis, S. (1842). A Topographical Dictionary of Wales: Comprising the Several Counties, Cities, Boroughs, Corporate and Market Towns, Parishes, Chapelaries, and Townships, with Historical and Statistical Descriptions: Embellished with Engravings of the Arms of the Cities, Bishoprics, Corporate Towns, and Boroughs; and of the Seals of the Various Municipal Corporations. With an Appendix Describing the Electoral Boundaries of the Several Boroughs, as Defined by the Late Act: Also Illustrated by Maps of the Different Counties, and a Map of North and South Wales (Public domain ed.). S. Lewis.
- Poole, Edwin (1886). The Illustrated History and Biography of Brecknockshire: From the Earliest Times to the Present Day. Illustrated by Several Engravings and Portraits (Public domain ed.). Brecknock: Edwin Poole.
