= Greens Siding railway station =

Former railway station in the east of Clifford, Herefordshire, England

Greens Siding

General information
- Location: East of Clifford, Herefordshire; England
- Coordinates: 52.0981°N 3.0582°W
- Grid reference: SO276449
- Platforms: 1

Other information
- Status: Disused

History
- Original company: Great Western Railway
- Pre-grouping: Great Western Railway
- Post-grouping: Great Western Railway

Key dates
- 1903: Opened
- 1941: Closed to passengers
- 1950: Closed
Location

Greens Siding railway station was a station to the east of Clifford, Herefordshire, England. The station was opened in 1903, closed to passengers in 1941 and closed completely in 1950.

| Preceding station | Historical railways | Following station |
|---|---|---|
| Clifford; Line and station closed | Great Western Railway; Golden Valley Railway | Westbrook; Line and station closed |
