= St Mary's Church, Hay-on-Wye =

Coordinates: 52.0722°N 3.1309°W

Church of St Mary the Virgin
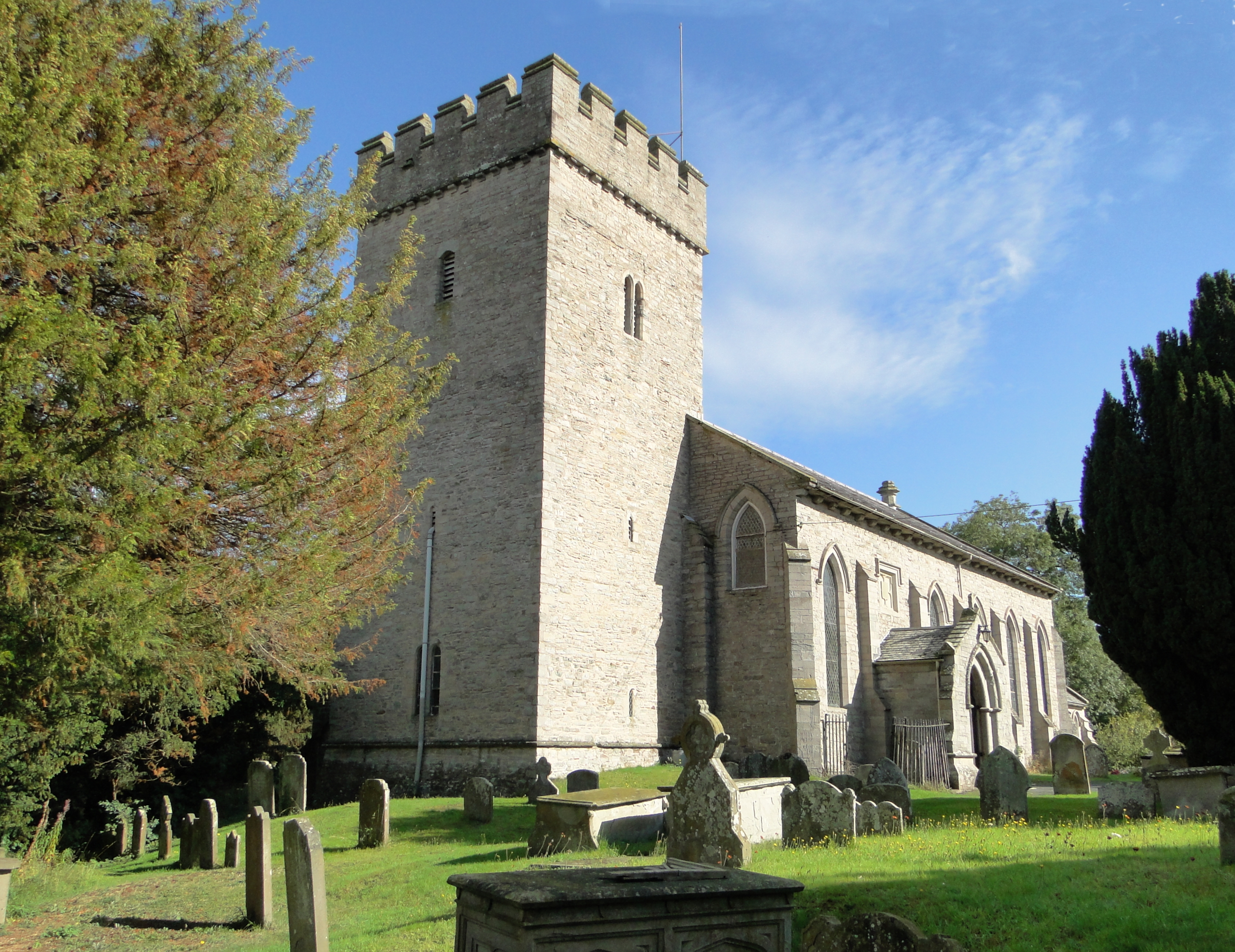
- Church of St Mary the Virgin
- Location: Hay-on-Wye
- Country: Wales
- Denomination: Church in Wales
- Churchmanship: Anglo-Catholic
- Website: stmaryschurchhayonwye.co.uk

History
- Status: Parish church
- Dedication: St Mary the Virgin

Architecture
- Functional status: Active
- Heritage designation: Grade II
- Architect(s): Edward Haycock Sr., et al.
- Style: Gothic Revival

Administration
- Diocese: Swansea and Brecon

St Mary's (also St Mary the Virgin) is an Anglican parish church in Hay-on-Wye, Powys, Wales. Separated by a deep dingle, which probably was formerly a moat, it is situated westward of the town centre, on an steep eminence near to the River Wye. The site has been occupied by a church since the 12th century; the building was largely rebuilt in the 1830s.

== History ==
The site has been occupied by a church since the 12th century, appearing to have its roots in the first Norman settlement in the Hay area; the church stands on the opposite side of a stream from Hay's first motte and bailey castle, which was built around the same time. The Hay area was anciently part of the parish of Llanigon, but a new parish of Hay was created around 1135, with St Mary's serving as its parish church.

The main focus of the town subsequently moved eastwards to a fortified site around Hay Castle, which was built from the late 12th century to replace the earlier castle. St Mary's then lay outside the walls of the fortified town. Around 1254, a chapel dedicated to St John, also called Eglwys Ifan, was built within the town walls. St John's appears from the Notitia Cambro-Britannica to have been in good repair in 1684, around which time it seems to have been the main church for Hay, with St Mary's being described as being ruinous around 1700. St John's was subsequently converted into a school-house, and St Mary's once again became the main church for the parish. St Mary's was largely rebuilt in 1833/4, retaining only the 15th-century tower from the earlier building. The small building consists of a nave and chancel, with a tower at the west end, containing one bell only.

== Architecture ==
Sr Mary's consists of a nave and chancel with a square embattled tower at the west end. The nave is ceiled, and has a gallery on the north and west sides. The building is substantial but plain, and may be said to partake of that economic style of Gothic ecclesiastic architecture which prevailed during the first half of the 19th century. The tower, with the exception of the upper portion extending a few feet downward from the battlements, is of considerable antiquity, and although slightly out of perpendicular, is in substantial repair.

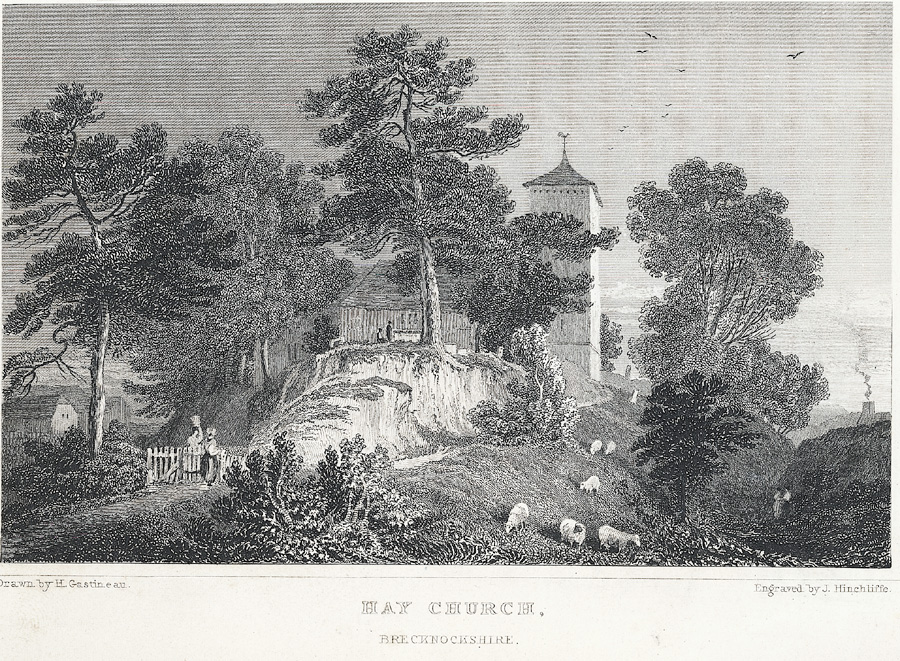
Hay Church

Both the interior and exterior of the church were repaired or restored in the mid-19th century, mainly through the efforts of Canon W. Latham Bevan, who was supported by the congregation and friends. The improvements were commenced 1866–7 by the erection of a porch at the principal entrance, and enlargement of the chancel by the addition of an apsis, of a horseshoe form, together with an organ chamber and vestry. The chancel was at the same time made available for seats, by the removal of a single arch of small proportions, which divided the chancel from the nave, and substituting the present three gothic arches, opening the full width of the chancel.

In form, the pulpit is octagonal; it is constructed of alabaster and marble, the lower part being arcaded and carried upon polished marble pillars; the upper portion is panelled in quatrefoils filled with medallions of our Saviour and the four evangelists. Round the pulpit is the following inscription: "Erected by Francis Robert Trumper, to the glory of God, in memory of his beloved wife Emma, who died Nov. 15th, 1865, and of her mother, Fortune Higgins, who died April 28rd, 1860."

In the 1870s, the pews were removed, substituted by open seats, and the former high front to the galleries replaced by one of a light and ornamental character. The latter portion of the work was effected in the years 1878–4.

Three stained windows in the apse, to the memory of Emma Meredith, were also presented by Trumper. The current stained windows include Scenes from the Passion of Christ (circa 1870) in the sanctuary apse, Abraham by the artist Arthur J. Dix (1906) on the south wall of the nave, adjacent to pulpit, and "Virgin and Child" (circa 1950) on the north wall of the nave.

== Fittings ==
The silver chalice formerly used in the administration of the sacrament at Hay Church is an interesting relic, supposed to be of the date of about 1575; it has engraved upon it in rude letters the legend, "Our Lady Paris of the Haia" (Our Lady, or St. Mary, Parish of Hay). In 2010, a Victorian-era pipe organ was placed in the west gallery.

== Monuments ==
Previous to the church being rebuilt, there stood within the wooden rails on the south side of the communion table, a tombstone upon the graves of several members of the Gwynn family; the slab is still preserved in the church, and appended is a copy of the inscription. At the top are the arms, in a lozenge quarterly, Brychan or Gwyn, and Boyle; round the inscription is a border of bine and leaves extremely well executed. "Here were interr'd the bodyes of Thomas Gwynn of ye Hay Castle Esq. Howell Gwynn his son and heir and ye vertuous and most charitable virgin Elizabeth Gwynn daughter and co-heir of ye said Thomas Gwynn. She founded an Almes house in the Hay for six poor people and endowed it with an annual gift towards their reliefe for ever. She departed this life the 12th day of May ano dni 1702." The living of Hay is a vicarage in the diocese of St. David's and archdeaconry of Brecknock. In 1886 the advowson was held by Sir Joseph R. Bailey, Bart. The register of baptisms and deaths commences in the fourth year of James II.

In the church is a block of stone rudely carved into the semblance of a monk, probably one of the monks of Brecknock Priory, but popularly known as Moll Walbee, for to that form has oral tradition distorted the name of Maud de St. Valeri. The legend connected with Moll Walbee ia described in the account of Hay Castle.

== Bell ==
In 1886, there was one bell, though at the time the church was rebuilt in 1884 (when the upper portion of the tower was renewed), the timber supports for several bells were removed. The bell was encircled with the inscription: "We move thee to God's glory." It also bears the initials of the founder "W.E." and the date 1740. The initials probably indicate William Evans of Chepstow, who was a founder of bells in and about the year 1782. This conjecture is supported by a local tradition that the bell was brought to Hay by one of the barges formerly used on the Wye for the transport of timber and bark. Many of these boats traded from Chepstow. The original peal were probably sold or melted down to provide the present solitary occupant of the steeple. The historian Jones considers the fact of there being but one bell a fortunate circumstance for the town, but afterwards qualifies this statement by saying "though a peal would not be as troublesome here as bells frequently are to the inhabitants residing in houses adjoining or surrounding a steeple."

== Grounds ==
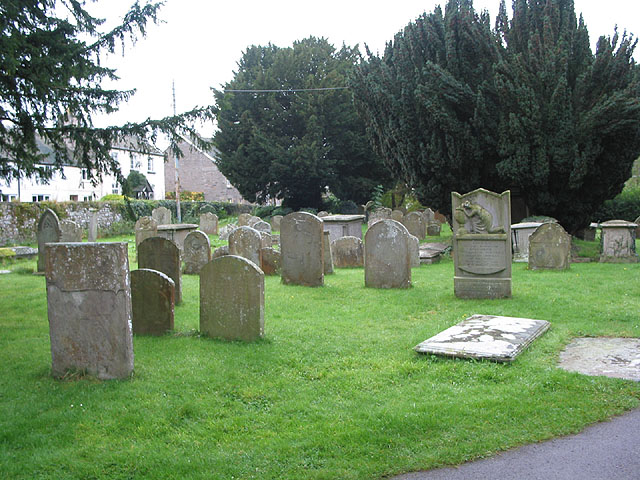
Churchyard of St. Mary the Virgin

The parish churchyard of Hay is small; it is somewhat of a triangular shape, and was formerly bounded upon two sides by deep dingles or ravines; that on the east having a small stream flowing through it is called the Login. Some writers have supposed this ravine to have been originally used as a moat. The hollow on the west side of the churchyard was partially filled up at the time of rebuilding the church. In Hay churchyard (according to a writer in 1886) may be found specimens of most of the quaint epitaphs commonly met with upon tombstones in rural churchyards, but none from their originality entitled to especial notice. Outside the north wall of the church is a walk composed of old tombstones removed there from the interior, where they had previously been used for paving the floor of the church. In 1886 it was described that several of these stones bore dates of the latter half of the eighteenth century, and one dated "1694."

== Bibliography ==
- Jones & Company (1830). Wales Illustrated: In a Series of Views, Comprising the Picturesque Scenery, Towns, Castles, Seats of the Nobility & Gentry, Antiquities, &c (Public domain ed.). Jones & Company.
- Poole, Edwin (1886). The Illustrated History and Biography of Brecknockshire: From the Earliest Times to the Present Day. Illustrated by Several Engravings and Portraits (Public domain ed.). Brecknock: Edwin Poole.
