= Clifford railway station =

Former railway station in Herefordshire, England

Clifford

General information
- Location: Clifford, Herefordshire; England
- Coordinates: 52.1045°N 3.0958°W
- Grid reference: SO250456
- Platforms: 1

Other information
- Status: Disused

History
- Original company: Golden Valley Railway
- Pre-grouping: Great Western Railway
- Post-grouping: Great Western Railway

Key dates
- 1881: Opened
- 1941: Closed to passengers
- 1950: Closed
Location

Clifford railway station was a station in Clifford, Herefordshire, England. The station was opened in 1881, closed to passengers in 1941 and closed completely in 1950.

Preceding station	Historical railways	Following station
Hay-on-Wye; Line and station closed	Great Western Railway; Golden Valley Railway	Greens Siding; Line and station closed
