= Margarette Golding =

Welsh born nurse and businessperson (1881-1939)

Margarette "Peggy" Golding
- as a nurse
- Born: 20 November 1881; Blaenau Ffestiniog, Wales, United Kingdom of Great Britain and Ireland
- Died: 1939 (aged 57–58)
- Occupations: nurse and Company director
- Known for: founding the Inner Wheel Club
- Spouse: Oliver Golding

Margarette "Peggy" Golding (born Margarette Owen; November 1881 – 1939) was a Welsh-born nurse and businessperson who was the founder of the "Inner Wheel" club in Manchester that has grown to be an international organisation - originally open to the wives of members of the Rotary Club only, but now open to all.

== Life ==
Golding was born in Blaenau Ffestiniog in 1881 and her family then moved to Hay on Wye. Golding trained as a nurse. She married Oliver Golding.

Women had been involved informally in the Rotary Club's work but discrimination prevented then from becoming members in their own right. Margarette Golding persuaded 26 other wives to meet her at a room she had reserved at Herriott's Victorian Turkish baths in Deansgate in Manchester. They met on 15 November 1923 where it was agreed to create a partner organisation to the Rotary Club which would assist the club in their role and provide a social benefit to its members. The first official meeting was on 10 January 1924 at their regular meeting place of the Social Club in Lower Mosley Street, Manchester.

Golding founded and named the Inner Wheel organisation for the wives of members of the Rotary Club. There were other similar groups in Britain, but it was Golding who organised them into a national organisation under the name of the Inner Wheel.

== Legacy ==
Golding has a plaque in Hay on Wye where she grew up. It was thought at one time that she had been born there. In 2008, Inner Wheel had nearly 100,000 members in 102 countries and was one of the largest women's organisations with consultative status at the United Nations.
