= Cheese Market, Hay-on-Wye =

Municipal building in Hay-on-Wye, Wales

The Cheese Market, Hay-on-Wye
- Marchnad gaws Y Gelli Gandryll (Welsh)
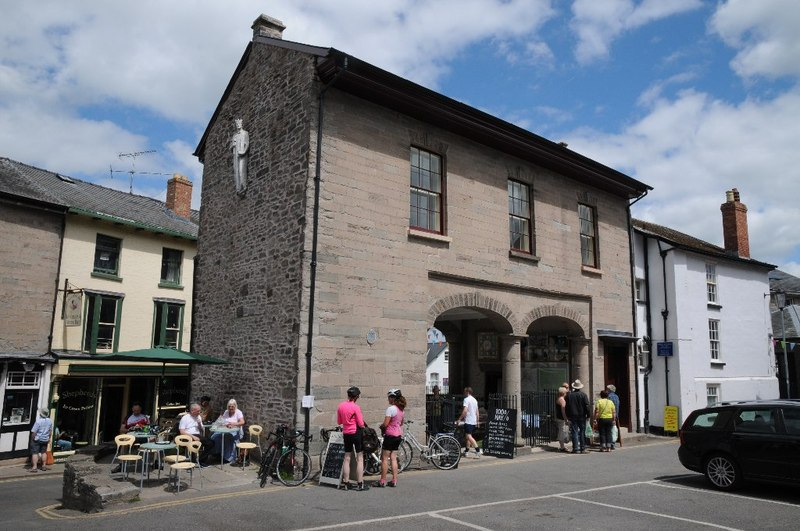
- The Cheese Market, Hay-on-Wye

- Shown in Powys
- 52.0744°N 3.1258°W
- Location: Market Street, Hay-on-Wye

History
- Built: 1835

Site notes
- Architectural style: Neoclassical style

Listed Building – Grade II
- Official name: Cheese Market
- Designated: 24 October 1951
- Reference no.: 7393

The Cheese Market in Hay-on-Wye (Welsh: Marchnad gaws Y Gelli Gandryll), formerly Hay-on-Wye Town Hall, (Welsh: Neuadd y Dref Y Gelli Gandryll), is a municipal building in Market Street, Hay-on-Wye, Powys, Wales. The structure, which has been restored with support from the Heritage Lottery Fund so that the first floor can be let out for residential use, is a Grade II listed building.

== History ==
The first municipal building in the town was a market hall which was completed in the 17th century. After the original structure became dilapidated it was demolished, and a local businessman, William Enoch, commissioned a butter market which was erected at the east end of the site: it was designed in the style of a Doric Temple, built in rubble masonry and was completed in 1833.

Around the same time, the lord of the manor, Sir Joseph Bailey, 1st Baronet, whose seat was at Glanusk Park, decided to commission a combined cheese market and town hall at the west end of the same site. The new building was designed in the neoclassical style, built in ashlar stone and was completed in 1835. The design involved an asymmetrical main frontage with three bays facing onto Market Street; there were two openings with voussoirs and keystones separated by a Doric order column on the ground floor, and there was also a doorway in the right hand corner. On the first floor, there were three sash windows also with voussoirs and keystones surmounted by wide eaves at roof level. Internally, the principal rooms were the cheese market on the ground floor and an assembly room on the first floor, which was used as a venue for hearings of the manorial court.

In 1867, the then Lord of the Manor and owner of the cheese market, Sir Joseph Bailey, 2nd Baronet, purchased the butter market as well to consolidate his holdings. Hay's borough council, which had not met for many years, was abolished under the Municipal Corporations Act 1883. Instead the town was made a local government district in 1864, governed by a local board. Such districts were converted into urban districts in 1894. The new urban district council acquired the cheese market from the Glanusk Estate in 1901. It served as the venue for meetings of the local masonic lodge until new premises at Brecon Road were purchased in 1972. In 1926, the Bishop of Menevia, Francis Vaughan, gave his consent to Roman Catholic Mass being celebrated in the assembly room. This continued until 1967 when St. Joseph's RC Church in Belmont Road was opened.

Following local government re-organisation in 1974, ownership of the building passed to Brecknock Borough Council and, following the introduction of unitary authorities in 1996, it passed to Powys County Council. A statue sculpted by Edward Folkard depicting the only Welsh ruler of England, King Henry VII, was affixed to the west end of the building in the mid-1990s.

After serving as the home of the Hay Photography Club for a while, the assembly room then fell vacant and building began to deteriorate. In 2008, the building was acquired by a community interest company, which secured a grant of £286,000 from the Heritage Lottery Fund to carry out restoration works. A mosaic, designed by local artists Shelagh Popham and Pat Birk, was assembled from 900 tiles, each individually sponsored by members of the public to create a representation of the history of the town: the finished item was installed on one of the internal walls on the ground floor. Meanwhile, the programme of improvements to the building, which included the conversion of the assembly room into a private apartment for holiday-makers, was completed in April 2014.
