= Hay-on-Wye =

Town in Powys, Wales

Hay-on-Wye: Welsh: Y Gelli Gandryll
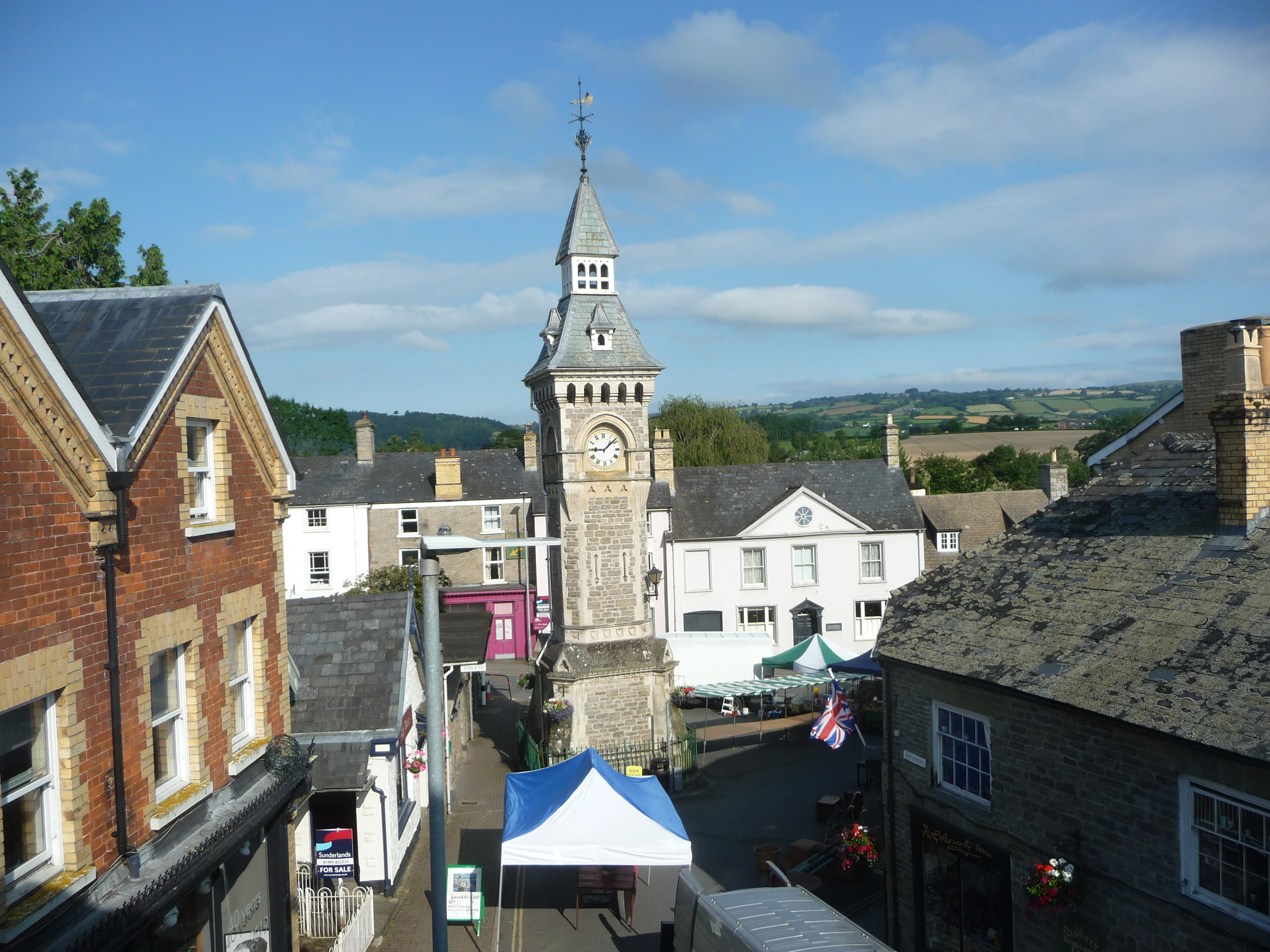
- Hay-on-Wye clock tower

- Location within Powys
- Population: 1,675 (Community, 2021)
- OS grid reference: SO225425
- Community: Hay
- Principal area: Powys
- Preserved county: Powys
- Country: Wales
- Sovereign state: United Kingdom
- Post town: HEREFORD
- Postcode district: HR3
- Dialling code: 01497
- Police: Dyfed-Powys
- Fire: Mid and West Wales
- Ambulance: Welsh
- UK Parliament: Brecon, Radnor and Cwm Tawe
- Senedd Cymru – Welsh Parliament: Brecon and Radnorshire
- List of places UK Wales Powys 52.075°N 3.125°W Community map: Map of the community

Hay-on-Wye, or simply Hay (Welsh: Y Gelli Gandryll; Welsh pronunciation: [ə ˈɡɛɬi ˈgandrɪɬ] or simply Y Gelli), is a market town and community in Powys, Wales. With over twenty bookshops, it is often described as a "town of books"; it is both the National Book Town of Wales and the site of the annual Hay Festival. The community had a population of 1,675 at the 2021 census.

The town is twinned with Redu, a village in the Belgian municipality of Libin, and with Timbuktu, Mali, West Africa.

Hay-on-Wye is often named as one of the best places to live in Wales and has been named as one of the UK's best Christmas destinations.

== Location ==
The town lies on the south-east bank of the River Wye and is within the north-easternmost tip of the Brecon Beacons National Park, just north of the Black Mountains. The town is just on the Welsh side of the border with Herefordshire, England, here defined by the Dulas Brook. Where the brook joins the River Wye just north of the town, the border continues northwards along the river. The Wye was the boundary between the former counties and districts of Radnorshire and Brecknockshire, with Hay lying in the latter.

The adjacent parish of Cusop lies on the English side of the Dulas Brook, with parts of the urban area of Hay now crossing the border into the parish of Cusop. The nearest city is Hereford, county town of Herefordshire, some 22 miles (35 km) to the east. Hereford serves as the post town for Hay, so that its official postal address is "Hay-on-Wye, Hereford", despite Hay being in Wales and Hereford in England.

Hay-on-Wye is in the area known as "Kilvert country" which includes Clyro, Capel-y-ffin, Llowes, Glasbury, Llanigon, Painscastle, Clifford and Whitney-on-Wye.

== Toponymy ==
The settlement's name is first referred to between 1135 and 1147 as Haya; in 1299 the name of La Haye is used. By the 16th century it was simply called Hay, and the use of the river as a suffix is a later addition. In 1215, a Welsh name, Gelli was recorded, and Gelli gandrell in 1614; the two names may have been used concurrently in 1625. The English language name, Hay, is derived from Old English hæġ, possibly meaning a 'fenced area' and a noun used in late Saxon and Norman times for an enclosure in a forest. The Welsh word celli (lenited to Gelli) has a range of meanings, including wooded areas of various extents.

The legal name of the community is Hay rather than Hay-on-Wye. In 1947 the General Post Office changed the name of the postal locality from Hay to Hay-on-Wye. The change of postal address did not change the name of the urban district that covered the town, which retained the name Hay and was subsequently converted into a community called Hay in 1974.

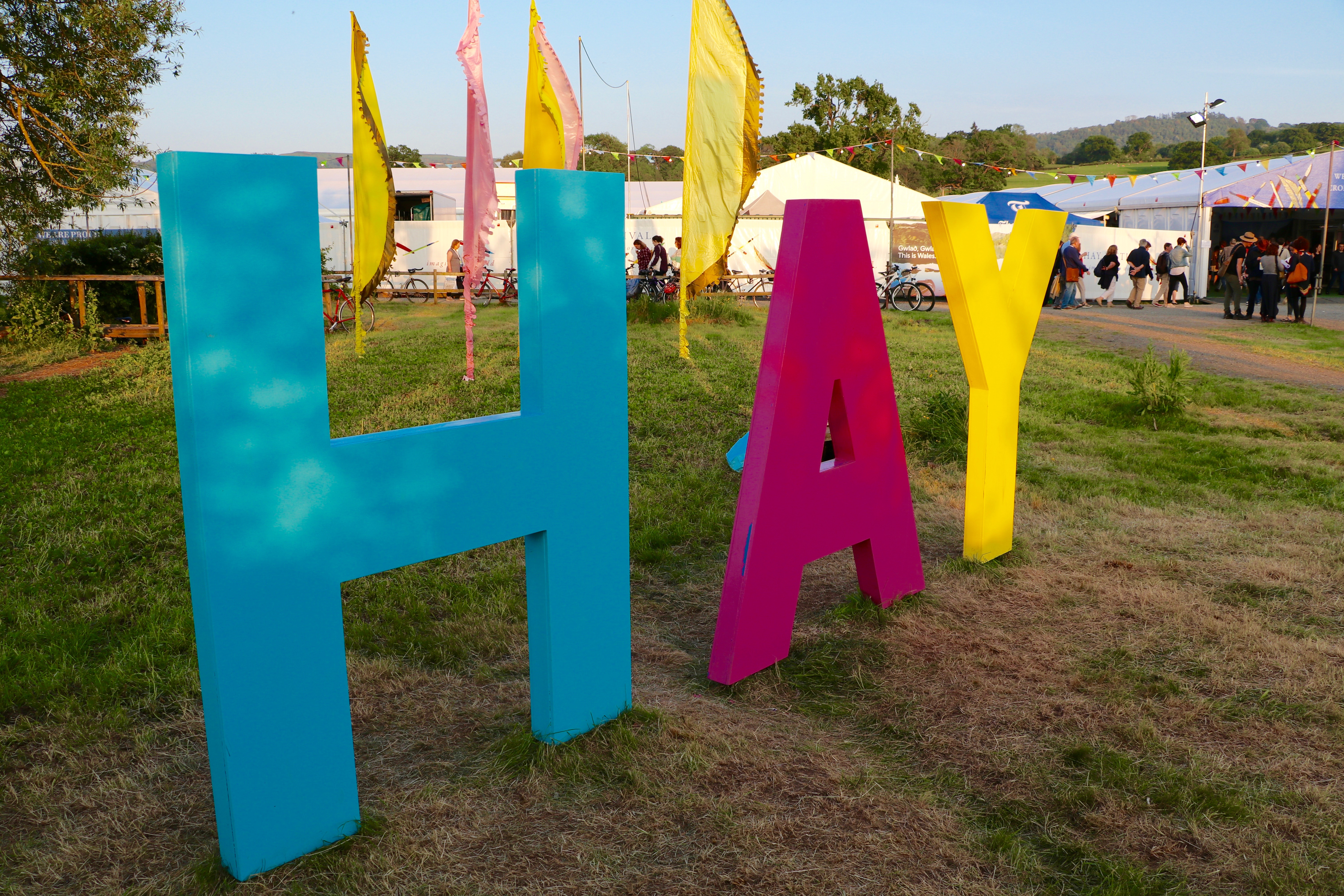
Entrance to Hay Festival fields

== History ==
The village of Llanigon is about 2 miles (3 km) south-west of the town of Hay-on-Wye. Before the Norman Conquest, Hay-on-Wye was part of the parish of Llanigon. The church of St. Eigon (possibly identified with Saint Eigen) in Llanigon was the principal church for the area. This was because the settlement in Llanigon predated the settlement in Hay-on-Wye.

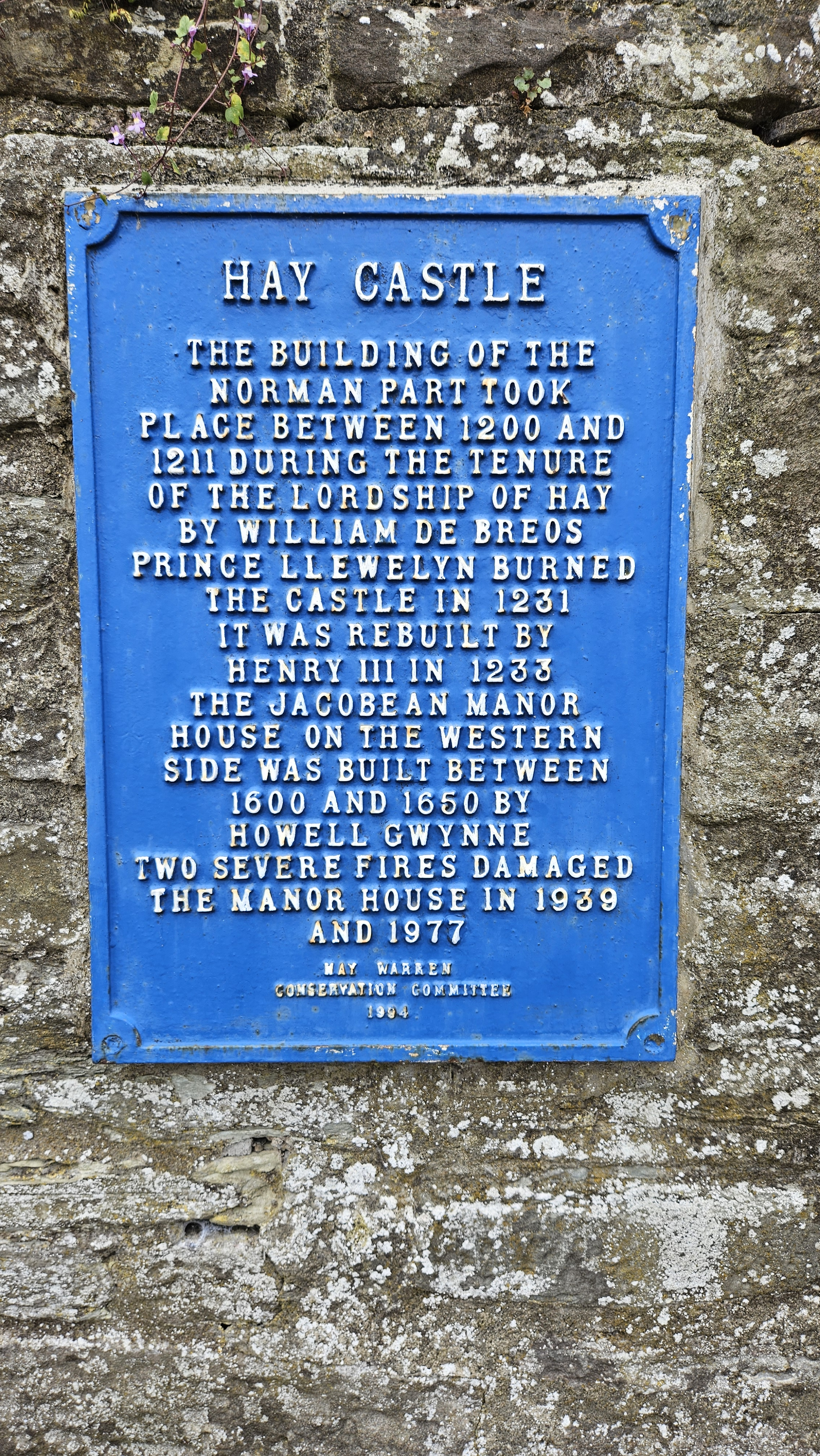
Hay Castle

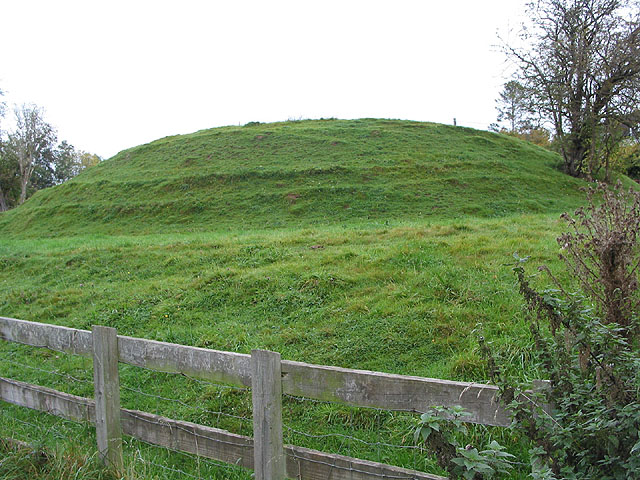
Hay-on-Wye Tump

Brycheiniog (an independent kingdom in Wales) was conquered between 1088 and 1095 following the second Norman invasion of Wales. The Norman invaders were led by Bernard de Neufmarché, a marcher Lord. He divided Brycheiniog into smaller lordships, which were gifted to the knights who contributed to the conquest. The Llanthomas lordship (in Llanigon) was part of the Hay lordship owned by William Revel, one of Bernard's knights. Motte and bailey castles were typically built soon after a lordship was allocated to a knight.

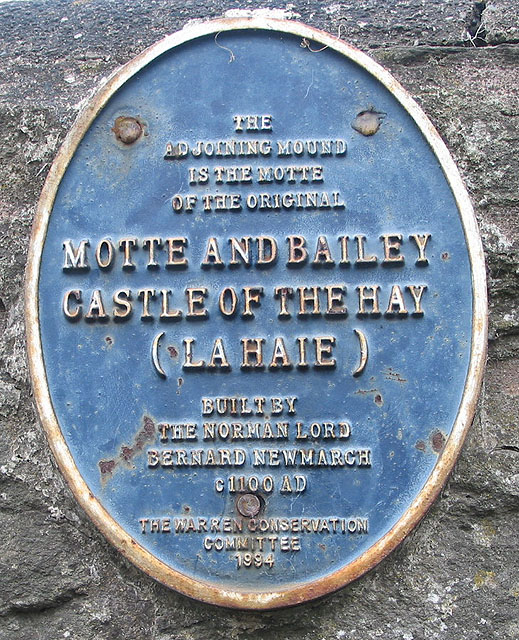
Hay-on-Wye Tump

Hay-on-Wye grew after the conquest. Around 1121, a motte and bailey castle was built near St. Mary's. It is thought to have been built by William Revel. The castle remains are known as Hay Tump. The church of St Mary's was built around 1135 and took over the role of the principal church and parish for the area. St. Mary's is near Login Brook and the River Wye.

The main part of the town was subsequently developed on a spur of land between the River Wye and Dulas Brook, about 200 metres east of Hay Tump. The town was fortified with walls and defended by Hay Castle, which appears to have been built from the late 12th century onwards. The earlier centre of settlement around Hay Tump and St Mary's Church lay outside the later town walls. A chapel dedicated to St John was subsequently built inside the town walls around 1254.

In post-conquest times, Hay-on-Wye was divided between two manors, known as an Englishry (i.e. English Hay or Haya Anglicana) and a Welshry (i.e. Welsh Hay or Haya Wallensis). The Englishry was within the fortified town of Hay. The Welshry was outside the fortified town; it included some rural land, the village of Llanigon and the hamlet of Glynfach.

In 1894, Hay Urban parish was created from part of the Hay Urban District. Hay Tump is within the Hay Urban parish. Hay Rural parish was created from the rural part of the parish of Hay, and includes another Norman castle called Llanthomas Castle Mound. It is on the same lane as the Hay Festival fields (Dairy Meadows). D. J. Cathcart King's list of UK castles numbers Hay Castle as Hay No. 1, Hay Tump as Hay No. 2 and Llanthomas Castle Mound as Hay No. 3.

Hay Castle initially took the form of an earth ringwork with a stone gate-tower. It was reinforced in stone around 1200 with a curtain wall. The castle was damaged during the Welsh rebellion led by Owain Glyndŵr around 1401, and again in 1460 during the Wars of the Roses. It was substantially expanded in the 17th century, creating a Jacobean mansion. Substantial restoration work on Hay Castle was completed in 2022.

== Book town ==
Hay-on-Wye is a destination for bibliophiles in the United Kingdom, with two dozen bookshops, many selling specialist and second-hand books, although the number has declined sharply in recent years, many becoming general antique shops and similar. Hay-on-Wye was already well known for its many bookshops before the festival was launched. Richard Booth opened his first shop there, called The Old Fire Station, in 1962, and by the 1970s Hay had gained the nickname "The Town of Books".

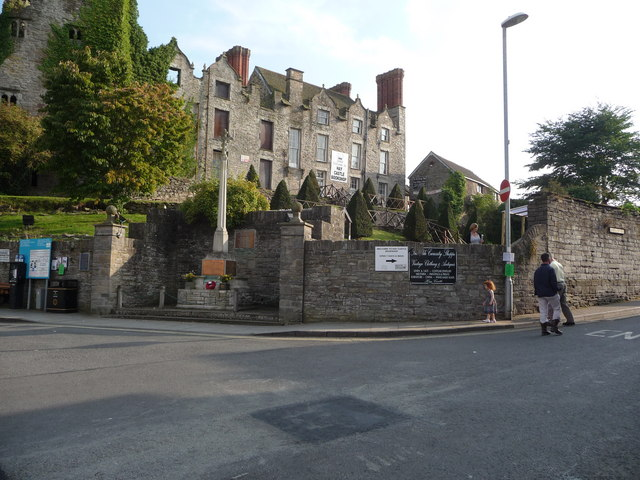
Hay Castle and war memorial

=== Hay Festival ===
Since 1988, the Hay Festival based in Hay-on-Wye has been the venue for an annual literary festival, now sponsored by The Daily Telegraph newspaper, which draws a claimed 80,000 visitors over ten days at the end of May or beginning of June to see and hear big literary names from all over the world. Devised by Norman, Rhoda and Peter Florence in 1988, the festival was described by Bill Clinton in 2001 as "The Woodstock of the mind". Tony Benn said: "In my mind it's replaced Christmas". In late July 2021, co-founder and director Peter Florence resigned as Festival Director.

== Governance ==
There are two tiers of local government covering Hay, at community (town) and county level: Hay Town Council and Powys County Council. The town council is based at offices on Brecon Road. For elections to Powys County Council, there is a ward called Hay which covers the same area as the community of Hay.

=== Administrative history ===
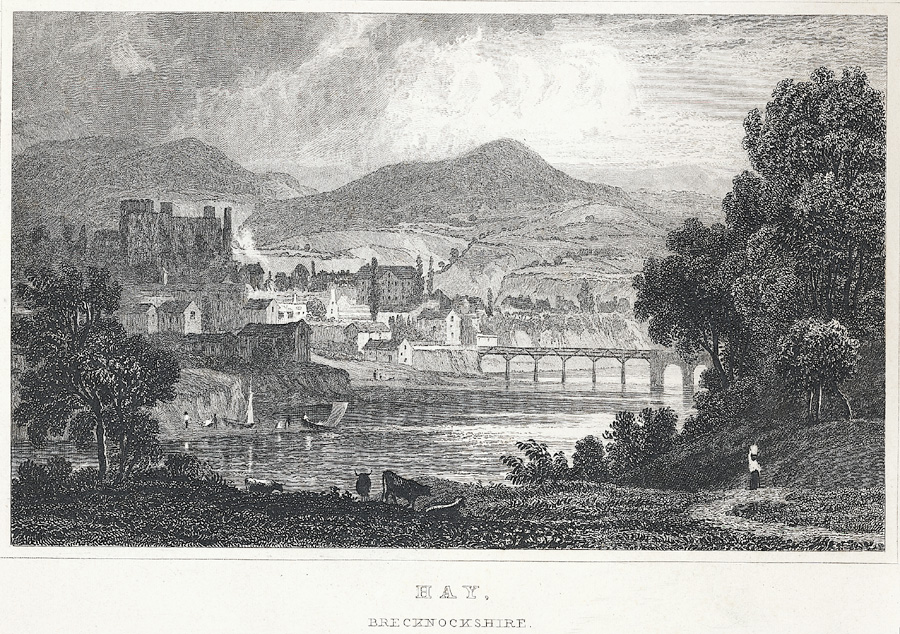
Hay-on-Wye, Brecknockshire 1860

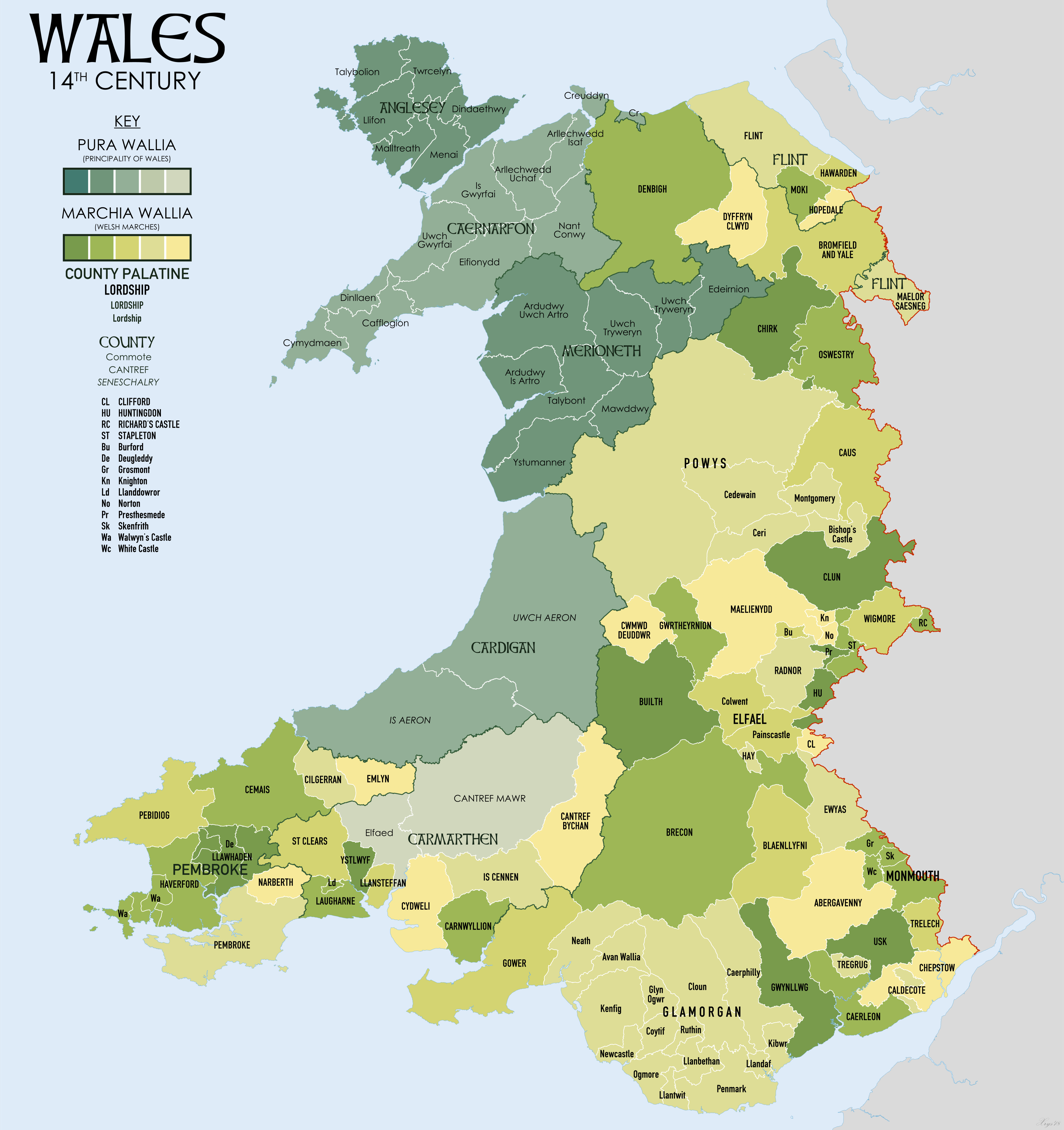
Marcher lordships in the 14th-century Wales

The parish of Hay was created around 1135 from the north-eastern parts of the older parish of Llanigon. Until 1536 Hay was a marcher lordship. In 1536 the Hay lordship was included in the new county of Brecknockshire.

The area of the fortified town was sometimes described as a borough, but it was never given a charter and it appears that no borough council ever operated; instead the town was administered by officials appointed by the lord of the manor. Any residual claim Hay may have had to be called a borough was extinguished under the Municipal Corporations Act 1883.

In 1864 the north-eastern part of the parish of Hay, covering the built-up area as it then was and some adjacent areas, was made a local government district, administered by an elected local board. Such districts were reconstituted as urban districts under the Local Government Act 1894. The 1894 Act also directed that parishes were no longer allowed to straddle district boundaries, and so the parish of Hay was split into a Hay Urban parish covering the same area as the urban district, and a Hay Rural parish covering the part of the old parish outside the urban district.

Hay Urban District was abolished in 1974, with its area instead becoming a community called Hay within the Borough of Brecknock in the new county of Powys. The former urban district council's functions therefore passed to Brecknock Borough Council, which was in turn abolished in 1996 and its functions passed to Powys County Council. The Hay Rural parish also became a community in 1974, but was abolished in 1986 and its area absorbed into the neighbouring parish of Llanigon.

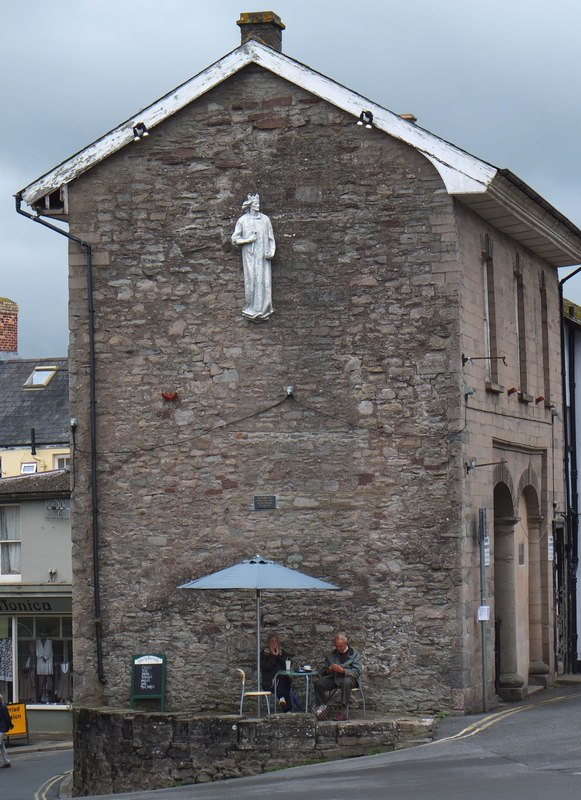
Former Hay-on-Wye Town Hall, the Cheese Market (Statue of Henry VII)

== Transport ==
The B4350 runs through the town and the B4351 links it with the main A438 from Brecon to Hereford, on the far side of the River Wye. The town has a road/pedestrian bridge spanning the River Wye linking Clyro with Hay-on-Wye.

The town was formerly served by train services at Hay-on-Wye railway station on the Hereford, Hay and Brecon line. On a stormy night in 1880, a goods train on the way to Brecon was derailed and destroyed a 3-arch masonry bridge. The train fell into Digeddi Brook at Little Ffordd Fawr, near Llanigon. The driver George Parker died, and his stoker John Williams had life changing injuries. The line closed in 1962, due to the line's commercial underperformance.

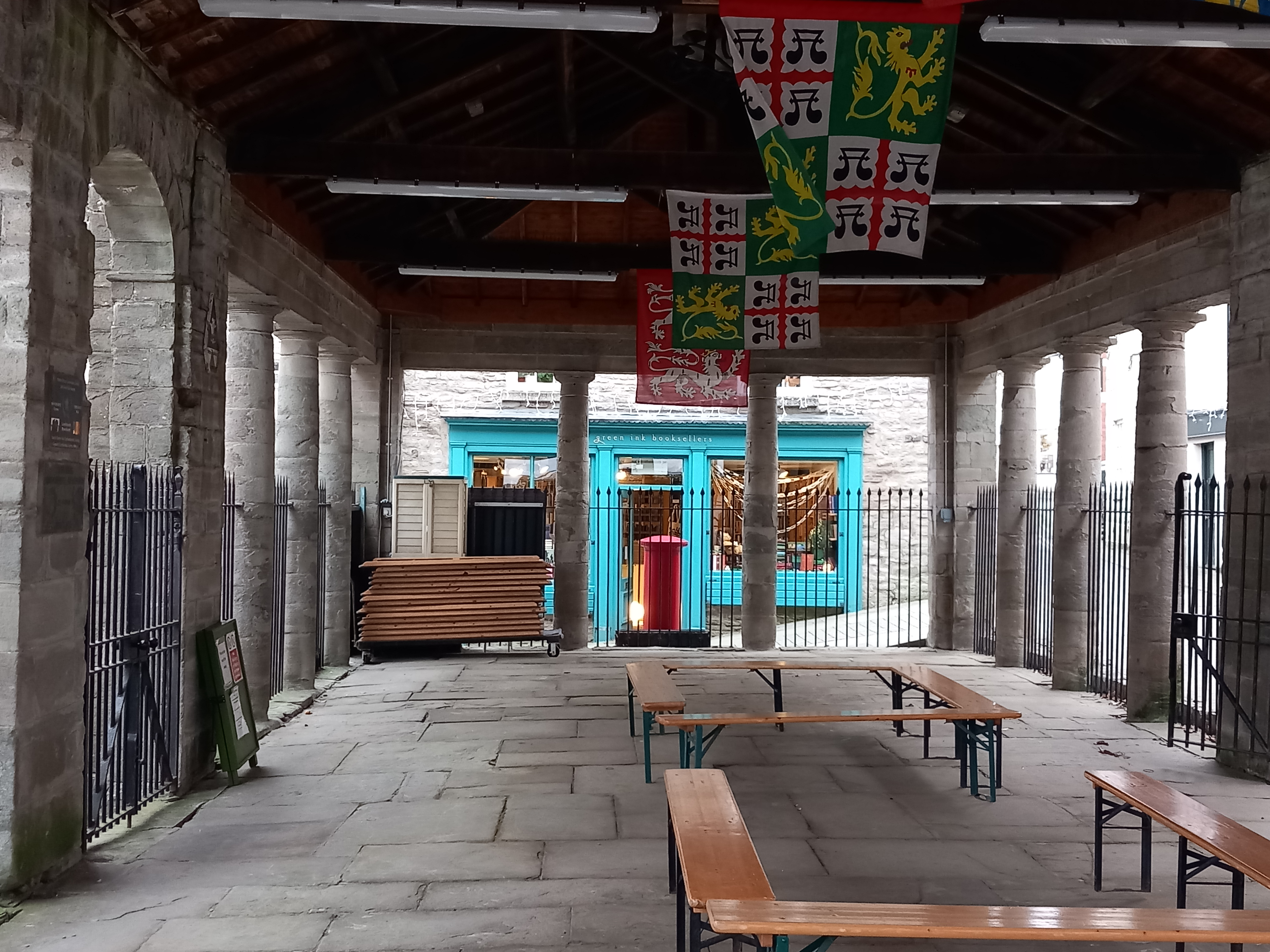
Butter Market

== Sport ==
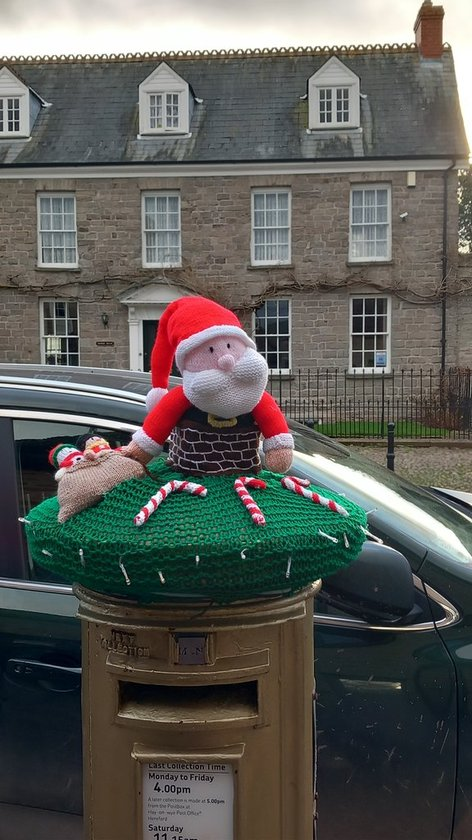
Postbox painted gold to honour Josie Pearson

Hay St. Mary's Football Club is based on Hay Sports Field, off Brecon Road, and they compete in the Mid Wales South.

Hay-on-Wye Cricket Club is also located on Hay Sports Field. The 1st team compete in The Marches Cricket League.

Hay-on-Wye bowling club is affiliated to the Mid Wales Bowling Association and the Women's Mid Wales Bowling Association.

Hay Golf Club (now defunct) was founded in 1903. The club continued on its nine-hole course until the onset of World War II.

== Music and philosophy ==
Hay hosts a philosophy and music festival, HowTheLightGetsIn, which occurs annually in May. It aims "to get philosophy out of the academy and into people's lives."

== Notable buildings ==
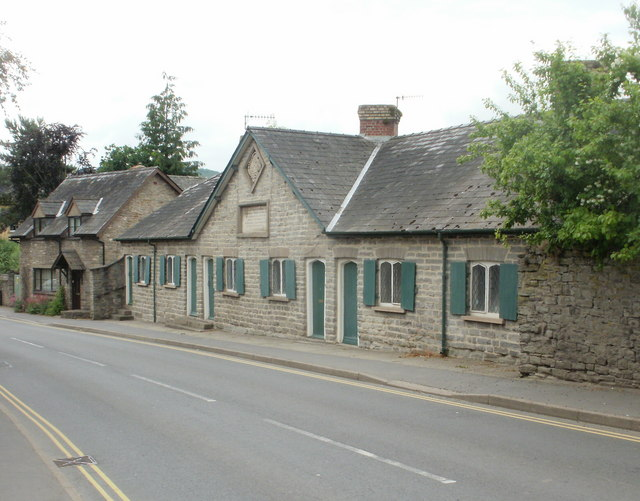
Harley's Almshouses

In 2013, Hay-on-Wye had 145 Listed Building entries. All are Grade II listed apart from Hay Castle which is Grade I listed. Other listed buildings include St Mary's parish church, Dulas Bridge (Newport St), the Swan Hotel (Church St), Harley’s Almshouses (4 Brecon Rd), Post Office (3 High Town), Ashbrook House (1 Brecon Rd), part of the town wall and many of the town centre inns and shops. Oakfield is a Grade II listed Regency house located south of the town centre: built in about 1820, it was recorded in 1842 as the home of Henry Allen Junior.

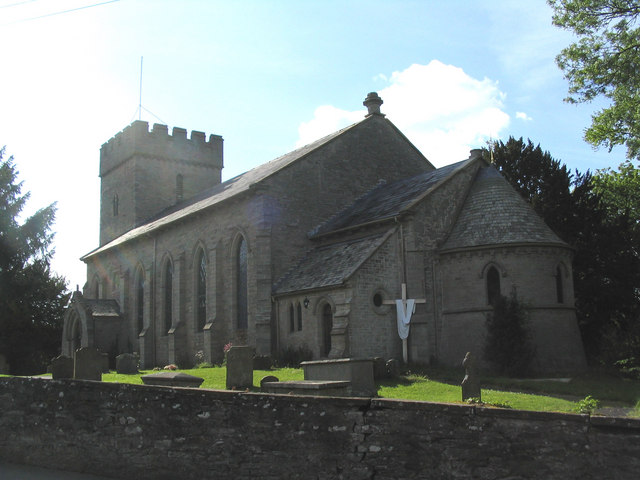
Church of St Mary, Hay-on-Wye

The Butter Market was commissioned by William Enoch and erected in the form of a Doric temple in 1833. The Cheese Market was commissioned by Sir Joseph Bailey, 1st Baronet and completed in 1835. The Butter Market and the Cheese Market had an arcaded ground floor to sell butter and cheese and dairy products, respectively. The first-floor assembly room has now been renovated to serve as holiday accommodation. On the end wall is a sculpture of Henry VII.

Hay-on-Wye has a Victorian clock tower about 50 ft high. The tower was erected in 1881 at a cost of £300. It is built of dressed Bath stone and native stone from Christfield quarry. It was known by locals as the "clockless tower". The clock faces and bell were added in 1884 after fund-raising by Canon Bevan and family. It was set going on Christmas Day 1884. The bell was paid for by a donation as a memorial to T. W. Higgins, Hay, and Guidfa House, Radnorshire.

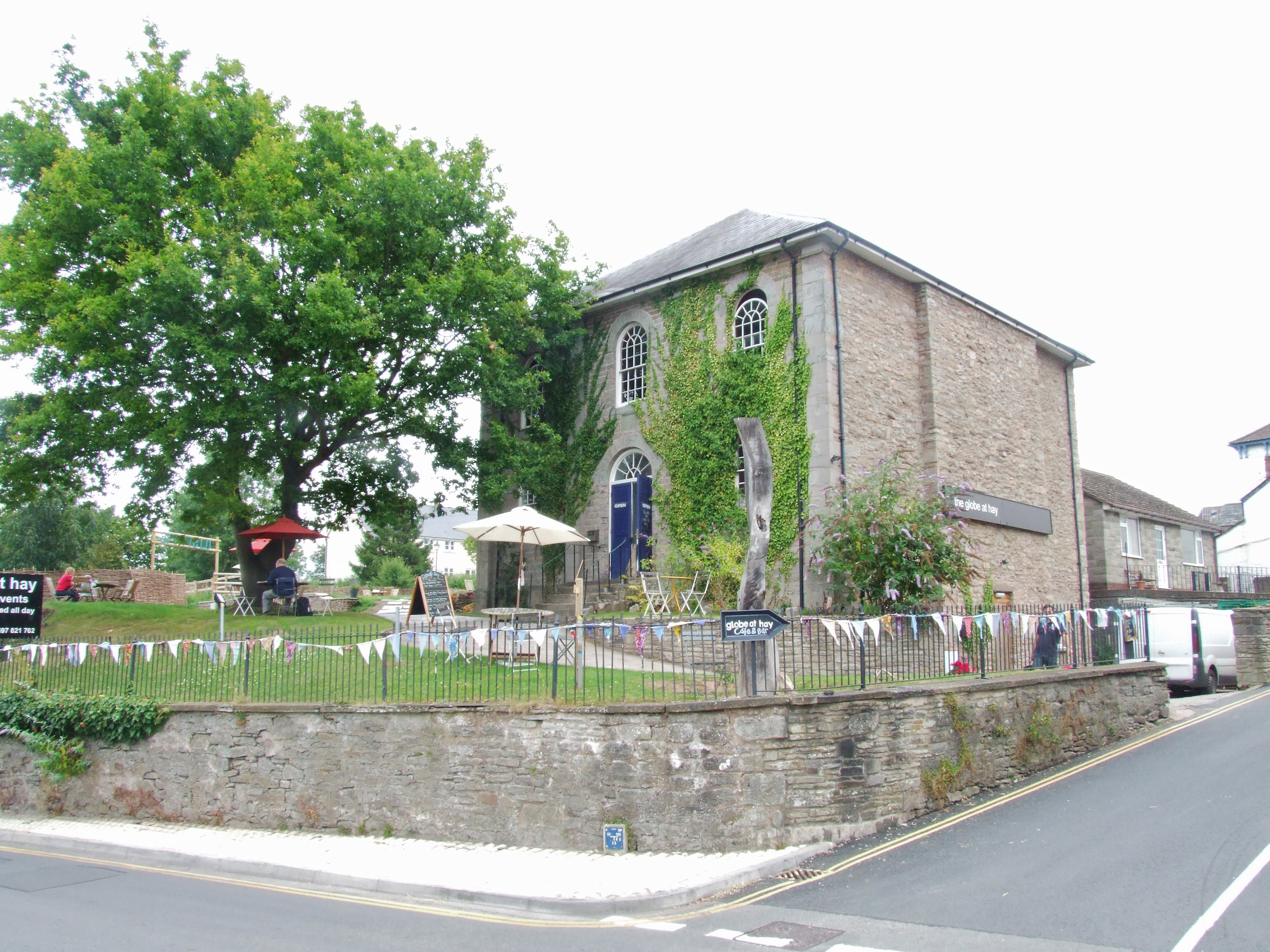
Former Ebenezer Methodist Chapel

Christian chapels and churches in Hay-on-Wye include:

- St. Mary's Church (Church in Wales) built in the early 12th century. It serves other local churches including St. John’s Chapel, in Lion Street; St. Eigon, Llanigon; St. Mary’s, Capel-y-Ffin etc.
- Tabernacle Calvinistic Methodist (now the Presbyterian Church of Wales), a Chapel located in Belmont Road, built in 1828, developed in 1872 and active until about 1963. It was repurposed as a Roman Catholic church in 1967.
- From 1892 to 1925, Roman Catholic Mass was celebrated in alternative weeks in the homes of H.R. Grant and T. J. Madigan. From 1925 to 1967, the hired assembly room over the Cheese Market was used as a Mass centre. Since 1967, St. Joseph's Roman Catholic Church in Belmont Road has been used.
- Salem Baptist Chapel located in Bell Bank, built around 1650 and developed in 1814 and 1877. The second oldest Nonconformist chapel in Wales. The associated schoolroom may be the oldest schoolroom in Wales. Repurposed as a Yoga studio in 2018.
- Trinity Wesleyan Methodist Chapel located in St. Mary's Road (1771) now a private dwelling, then the assembly room over the Cheese Market in Castle Street (1823) and then Oxford Road (built in 1872 and developed in 1903) and active until about 1910. Repurposed as the Oxford Road post office in 2021.
- Bethesda Primitive Methodist Chapel located in Oxford Road built in 1865. Repurposed as Bethesda Evangelical Church in 1953.
- Ebenezer (Congregational/URC) Independent Methodist Chapel located in the assembly room over the Cheese Market in Castle Street and then Broad Street (built in 1845). Repurposed as an Arts Centre in 2000.
- Quakers Friends' Meeting House located in Bridge Street in 1851, now a private dwelling.
- Salvation Army Hall/Citadel located in Lion Street in 1887, now St. John's Chapel, in Lion Street.

== Kingdom of Hay-on-Wye ==
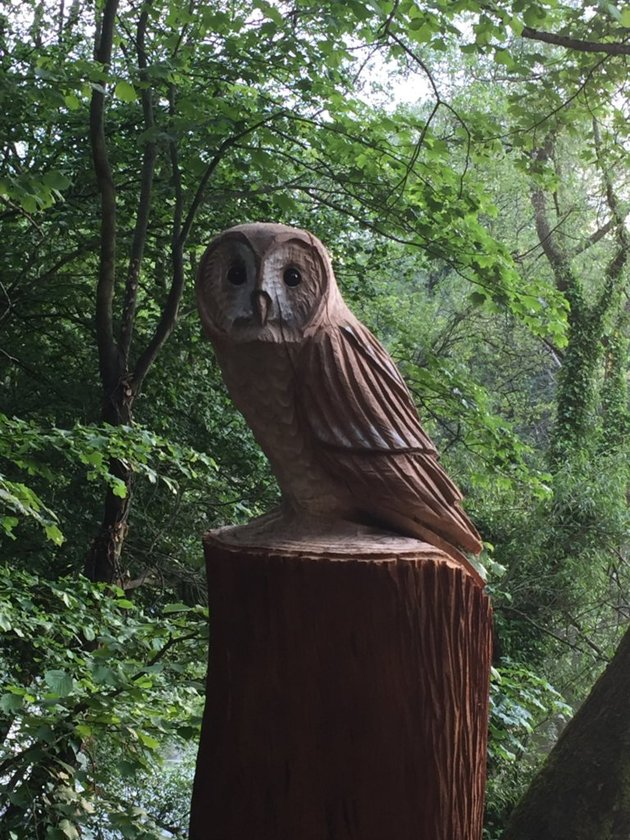
Footpath from Hay-on-Wye bridge to the Warren

On 1 April 1977 bibliophile Richard Booth conceived a publicity stunt in which he declared Hay-on-Wye to be an "independent kingdom" with himself as its monarch, and a National Anthem written by Les Penning. The tongue-in-cheek micronation of Hay-on-Wye has subsequently developed a healthy tourism industry based on literary interests, for which some credit Booth.

In 2005, Booth announced plans to sell his bookshop and move to Germany; on this occasion, the local MP, Roger Williams, was quoted as saying: "His legacy will be that Hay changed from a small market town into a mecca for second and book lovers and this transformed the local economy."

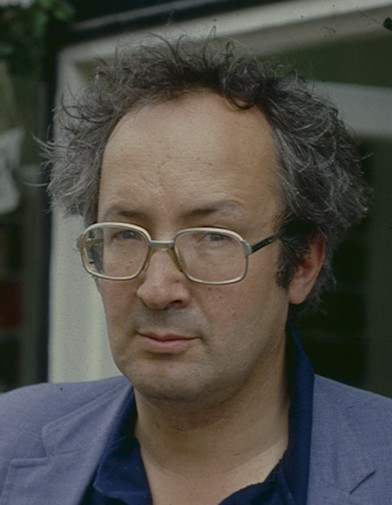
Richard Booth in 1984

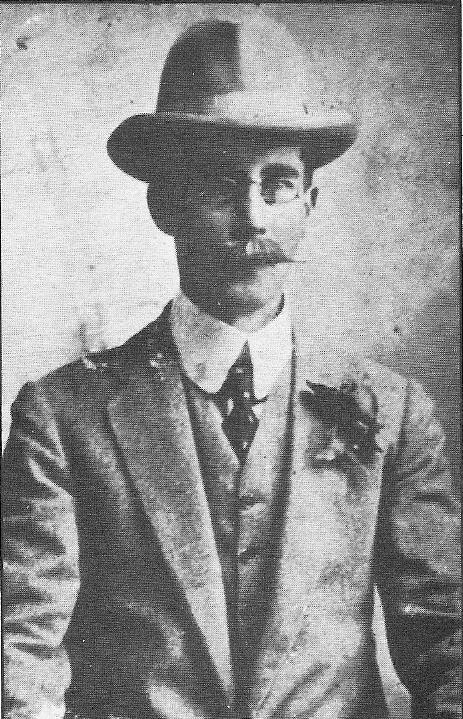
Herbert Rowse Armstrong

== Notable people ==
- Herbert Rowse Armstrong (1869–1922), the "Hay Poisoner"; the only UK solicitor to have been hanged for murder.
- Richard Booth (1938–2019), self-proclaimed "King of Hay".
- Lady Penelope Betjeman (née Chetwode) (1910–1986), English travel writer (and wife of Sir John Betjeman, the Poet Laureate).
- Chris Davies (born 1967), managed a veterinary practice in Hay-on-Wye, politician and MP for Brecon and Radnorshire 2015 to 2019.
- Christopher Dawson (1889–1970), scholar, authored books on cultural history and Christendom.
- Harold Dearden (1882–1962), lived in Hay-on-Wye, British psychiatrist and screenwriter.
- Geoffrey Lowrie Fairs (1909–1993). English industrial scientist and local historian. Born in Liverpool and educated at Emmanuel College, Cambridge, he spent his professional career with Imperial Chemical Industries, publishing many journal papers. He retired to Hay where he undertook extensive research about the town. His book, A History of The Hay, is the standard history of the town. His other book, Annals of a Parish, was published posthumously. Both can be found in some Hay bookshops.
- Margarette Golding (1881–1939), lived in Hay-on-Wye, nurse, businessperson and the founder of the "Inner Wheel".
- Henry Norman Grant (1892–1916), son of H.R. and Jane Victoria Grant who ran a newsagents in Castle St. Francis Kilvert was a frequent visitor to the newsagents, in the time of its previous owner George Horden. Henry was declared missing in action on the first day of the Somme offensive. It was more than a year before his death was confirmed. He is commemorated on the Hay-on-Wye and Cusop War Memorial.
- Bridget Gubbins (née Ashton) (born 1947), grew up in Hay-on-Wye. Authored books on social and local history.
- Eileen Hutchins (1902–1987), a Steiner school teacher.
- George Hay Morgan (1866–1931), politician and MP for Truro 1906 to 1918.
- John P. Jones (1829–1912), born in Hay-on-Wye, emigrated to the United States and became a Republican United States Senator.
- Josie Pearson (born 1986), Paralympian athlete and Gold Medal winner at the 2012 Paralympic Games. A Royal Mail postbox in Church St is painted in gold in her honour.
- Rhys Thomas Pryddererch (or Prytherch) (1883–1917), Calvinistic Methodist Tabernacle Minister in Belmont Rd. He died within 10 days of arriving on the Western Front in World War I. He is commemorated on the Hay-on-Wye and Cusop War Memorial.
- Leigh Richmond Roose (1877–1916), son of Rev. Richmond Leigh Roose the minister at the Calvinistic Methodist Tabernacle in Belmont Rd. Leigh was a Wales international footballer. He died in the battle of the Somme and is commemorated at the Thiepval memorial in France.
- Rafael Sabatini (1875–1950), lived near Hay-on-Wye, author of romance and adventure novels.
- Jane Dodds (born 1963), Welsh politician, Leader of the Welsh Liberal Democrats since 2017.
- Jenny Valentine (born 1970), children's novelist.
- Cleo Watson (born 1989), grew up in Hay-on-Wye, chief of staff for Theresa May and a special advisor to Boris Johnson.

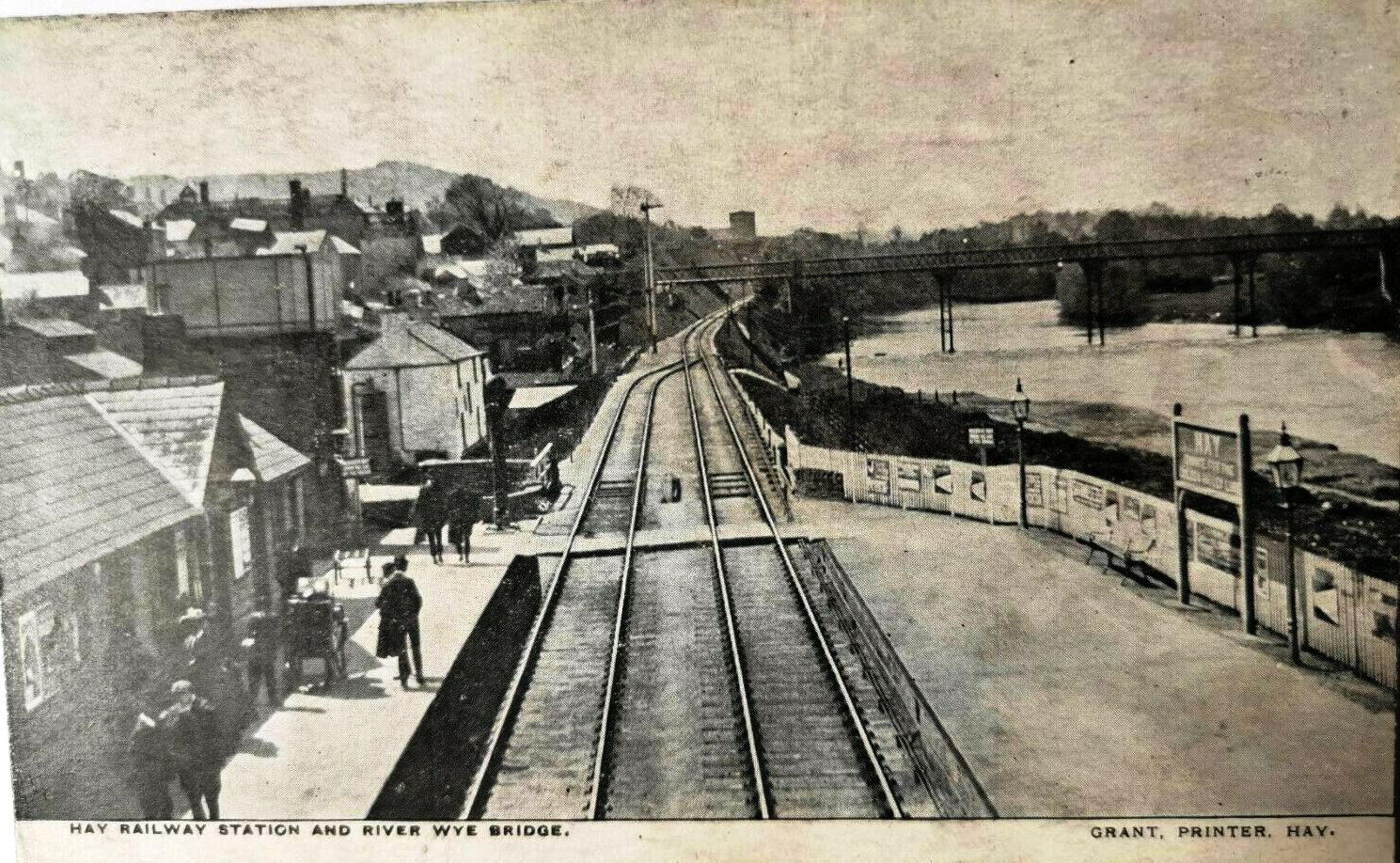
Hay-on-Wye railway station

== See also ==
- Sedbergh – the national book town of England
- Wigtown – the national book town of Scotland

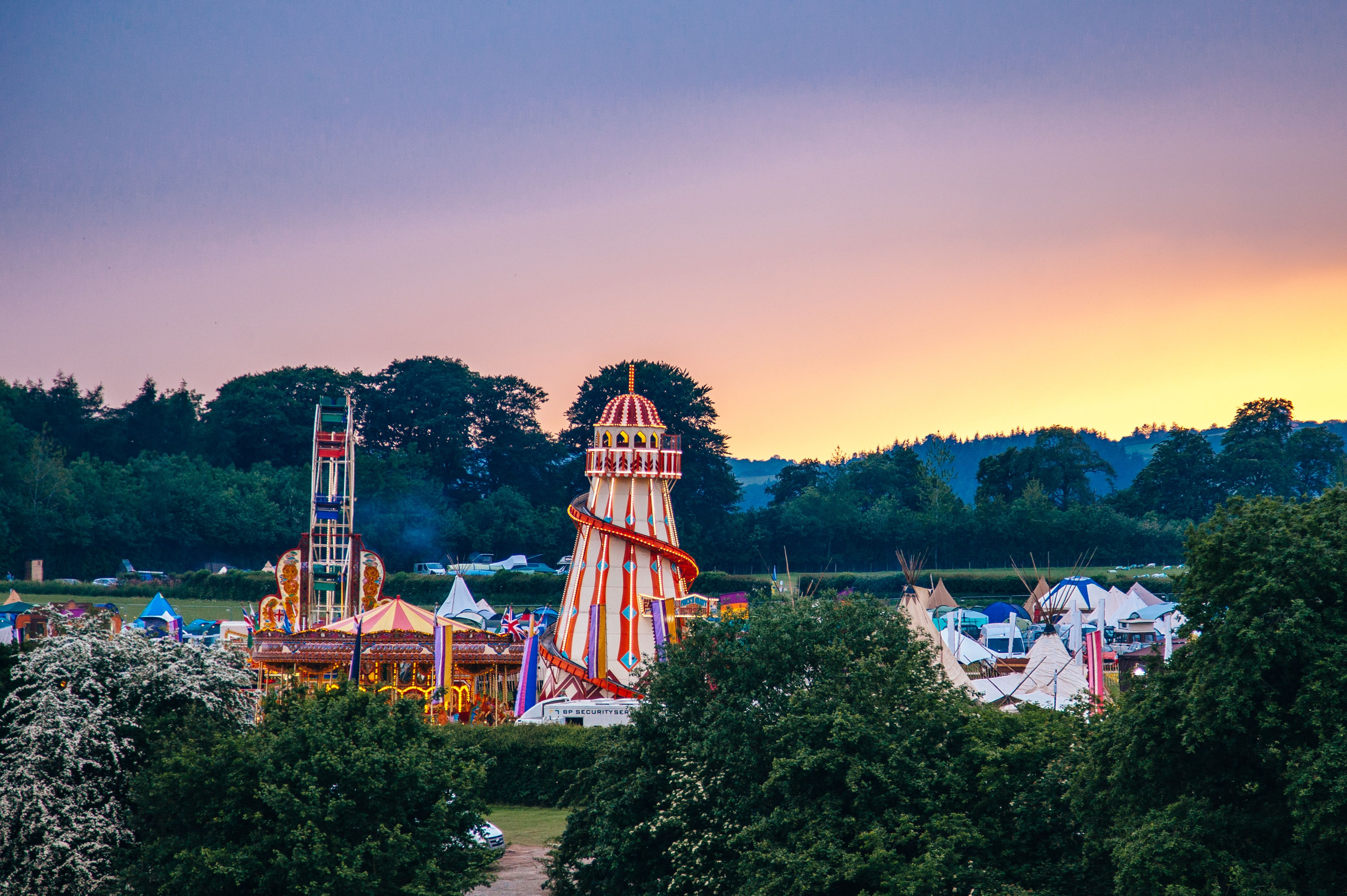
HowTheLightGetsIn Festival, Hay-on-Wye

== Bibliography ==
- King, D.J. Cathcart (1961). "The Castles of Breconshire". Brycheiniog. 7: 71–94.
- Remfry, P.M., Hay on Wye Castle, 1066 to 1298 (ISBN 1-899376-07-0)
