= Hay-on-Wye railway station =

Former railway station in Powys, Wales

Hay-on-Wye
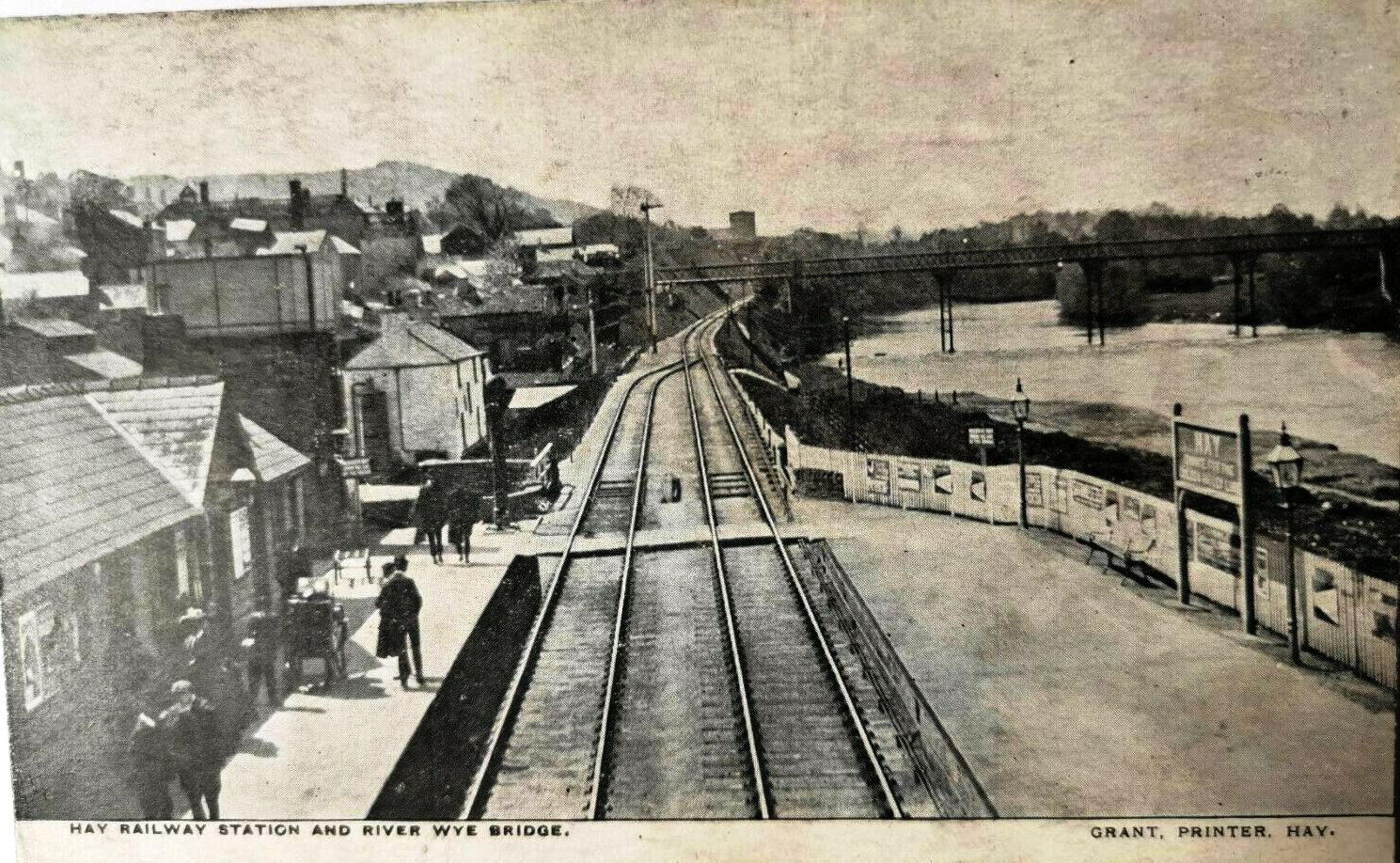
- The station from a postcard with the River Wye on the right; the small bridge over the Dulas Brook at the end of the platforms is the border between England (foreground) and Wales (background)

General information
- Location: Hay-on-Wye, Powys, Wales (platforms in Herefordshire, England)
- Coordinates: 52.0783°N 3.1247°W
- Grid reference: SO229428

Other information
- Status: Disused

History
- Original company: Hereford, Hay and Brecon Railway
- Pre-grouping: Midland Railway
- Post-grouping: London, Midland and Scottish Railway

Key dates
- 11 July 1864: Opened
- 1962: Closed
Location

Hay was a railway station serving the town of Hay-on-Wye, in Powys, Wales, although the platforms and station building were located just across the English border in Herefordshire. Hay had one of the earliest railway lines in Britain, being part of a horse-drawn freight tramway.

== History ==
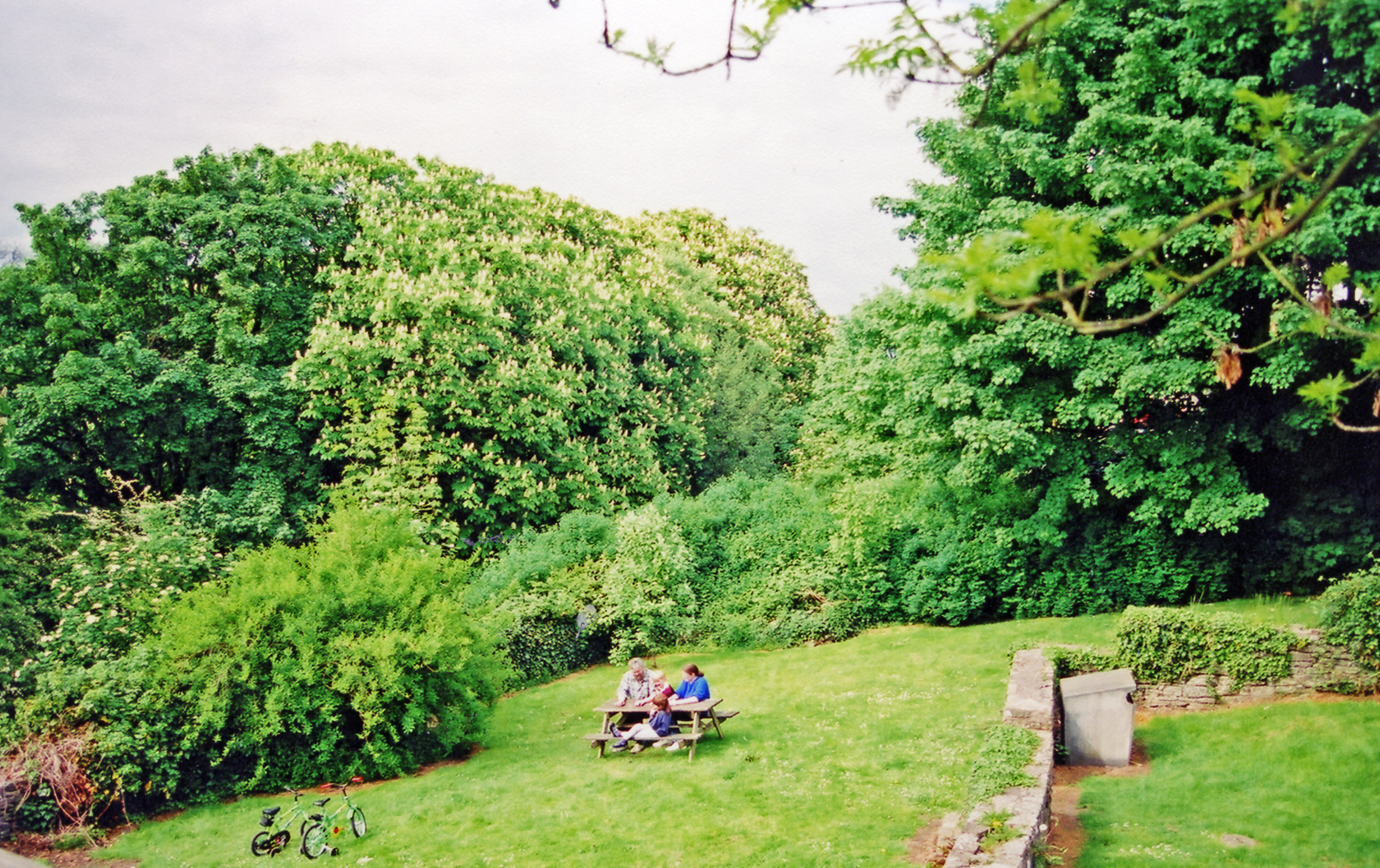
Station site, 2001

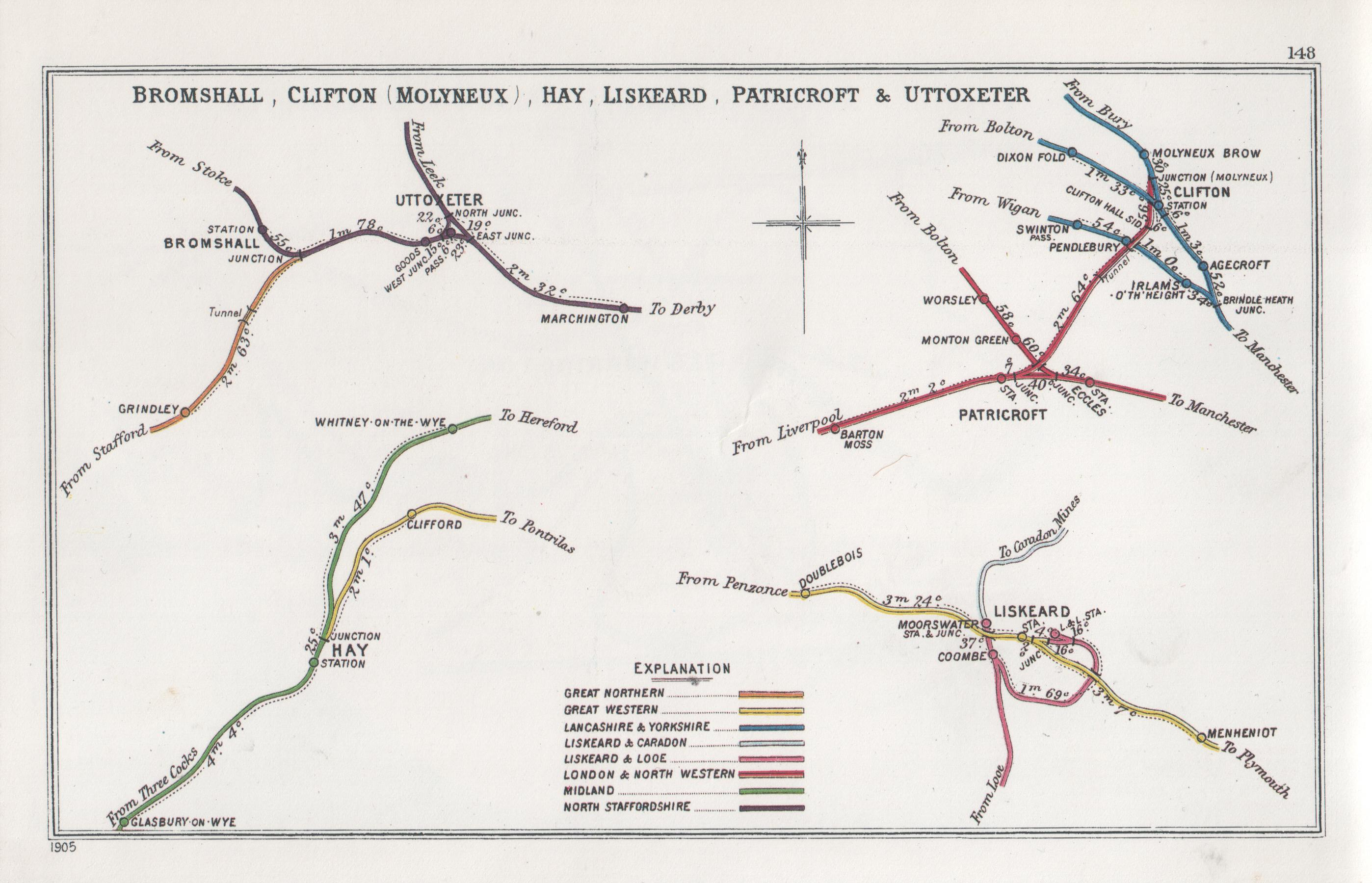
A 1905 Railway Clearing House junction diagram showing railways in the vicinity of Hay-on-Wye (shown here as Hay)

The Hay Railway, a horse-worked freight tramroad, opened from the Brecon & Abergavenny Canal at Brecon to Hay on 7 May 1816. The line was opened from Hay to Clifford Castle on 30 July 1817. The line was not completed between The Lakes at Clifford and Eardisley until 1 December 1818 because of the problem of the river crossing at Whitney-on-Wye. The Hay Railway was sold in 1860 to the Hereford, Hay and Brecon Railway (HH&BR) which made use of parts of its route.

The HH&BR was a struggling local line, much of it built by Thomas Savin, contractor and builder of many Welsh lines. It was completed in 1864. Like most local lines it was eventually rescued by a larger company – not the Great Western Railway, in whose territory it might be thought to lie – but the Midland Railway, which used it and other lines which it acquired or had running powers over, to put together a through route from Birmingham to Swansea via Hereford, Brecon, the Neath and Brecon Railway and the Swansea Vale Railway.

The Golden Valley Railway, which had its northern junction at Hay and ran through the Golden Valley to Pontrilas, was built between 1876 and 1889, was closed down in 1898, and then rescued by the Great Western Railway in 1901. It survived as a passenger line until 1941 and goods until the 1950s.

The whole of the Hereford to Brecon line including Hay was closed to passengers on 31 December 1962 and was completely closed by 1964.

== Incidents ==
On a stormy night in 1880, a goods train on the way to Brecon was derailed and destroyed a 3-arch masonry bridge. The train fell into Digeddi Brook at Little Ffordd Fawr, near Llanigon. The driver George Parker died, and his stoker John Williams had life changing injuries.

Preceding station	Disused railways	Following station
Glasbury-on-Wye; Line and station closed	London, Midland and Scottish Railway; Hereford, Hay and Brecon Railway	Whitney-on-Wye; Line and station closed
Glasbury-on-Wye; Line and station closed	Great Western Railway; Golden Valley Railway	Clifford; Line and station closed

== The site today ==
Former Station Stores shop on Newport Road, outside the station

Hay-on-Wye station has been completely demolished and the site is currently in commercial use.

== See also ==
- Hay Railway
