= Inner Wheel =

Rotary women's organization

- International Inner Wheel
- Where members volunteer in friendship to serve the communities worldwide.

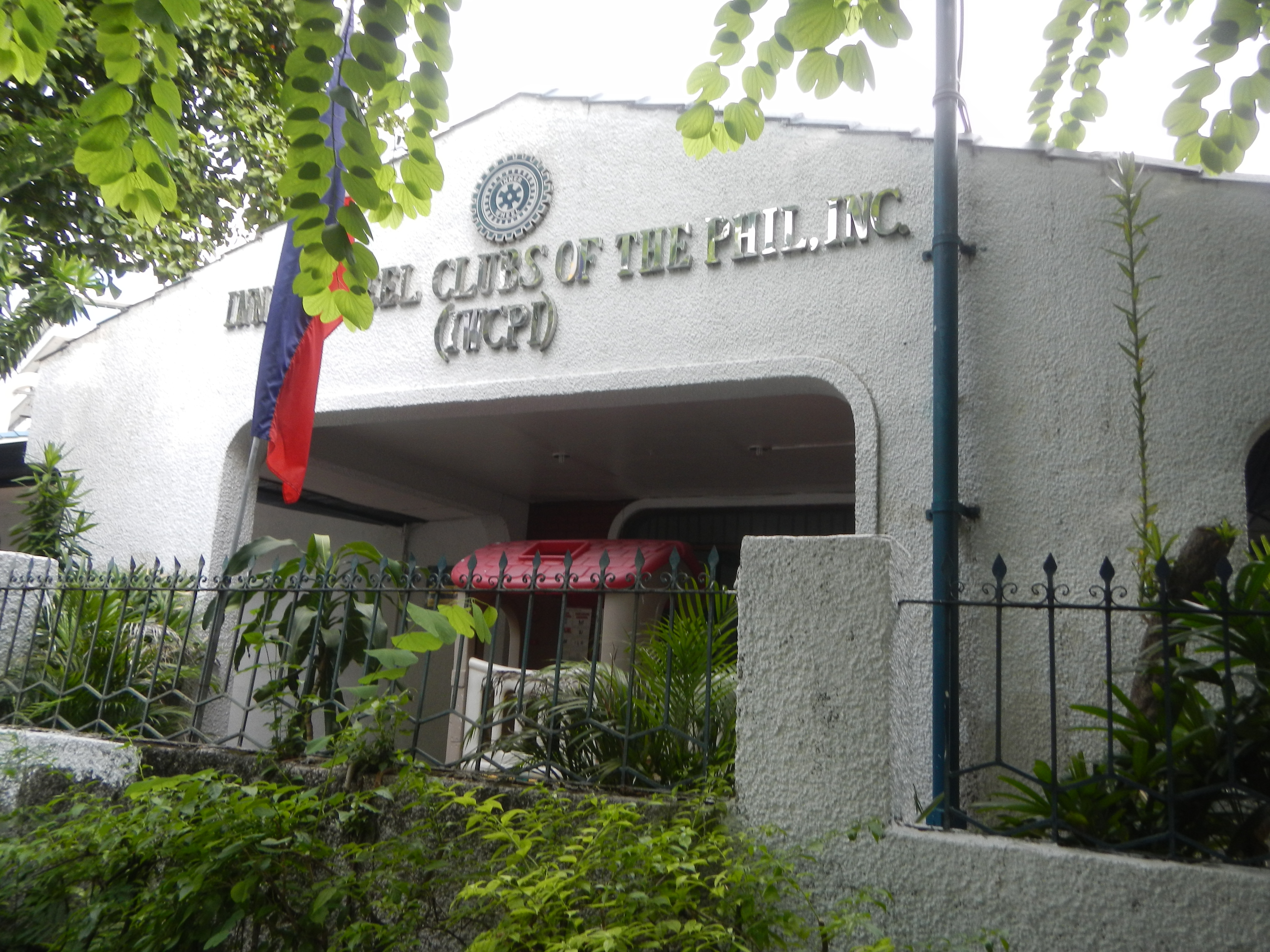
- Office in the Philippines
- Abbreviation: IIW
- Named after: Rotary Club emblem
- Formation: January 10, 1924; 102 years ago
- Founder: Margarette Golding
- Founded at: Manchester, England
- Type: Women's organization
- Headquarters: Suite 2.3 MyBuro; 20 Market Street; Altrincham, Cheshire; WA14 1PF
- Location: United Kingdom
- Region served: Global
- Members: 103,000 (2024)
- President: Mamta Gupta
- Main organ: International Governing Body (Executive Committee and Board of Directors)
- Affiliations: Rotary International
- Award: Margarette Golding Award
- Website: www.internationalinnerwheel.org

Inner Wheel is an international women's organisation affiliated with the Rotary Club. The group provides a mix of social and charity functions in over 100 countries.

== History ==
The organisation was officially founded on 10 January 1924 by Margarette Golding, a nurse, businesswoman and the wife of a Manchester Rotarian. She met with 26 other wives of Rotarians in November 1923. The first official Inner Wheel meeting was held on 10 January 1924 – this date is now known as "International Inner Wheel Day". This organisation was originally established for the wives and daughters of Rotarians although no Rotary connection is now required. Gradually other groups formed themselves into Inner Wheel Clubs and in 1934 the Association of Inner Wheel Clubs in Great Britain and Ireland was formed.

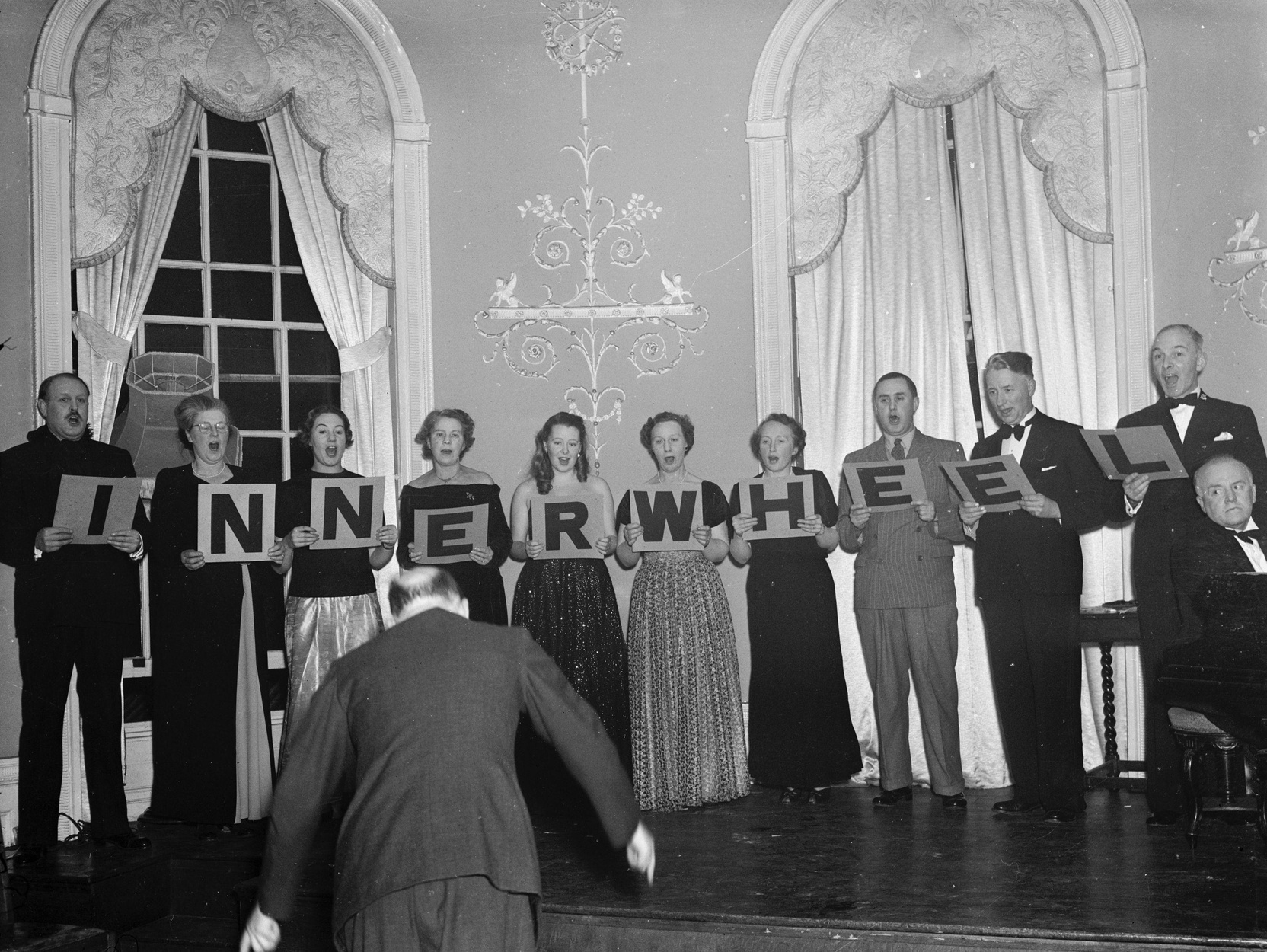
Ladies' night in Shrewsbury, 1952

The number of clubs around the world grew and in 1967 the International Inner Wheel came into being. There are clubs in many countries around the world. Inner Wheel clubs are grouped into districts with twenty-nine districts within Great Britain and Ireland. Helena Foster, who was the President in 1969–70, proposed that "Inner Wheel Day" should be celebrated on 10 January each year on the day that the original Manchester group adopted the name of "Inner Wheel" in 1924.

The Inner Wheel expanded to become a global organisation. In 1973 it gained consultative status with the United Nations in order to advocate on behalf of women. In 2012, the group opened their membership to all women over the age of 18 and stopped requiring that spouses be a member of the Rotary. Thus, they ceased to be a women's auxiliary but remained affiliated with Rotary International. By 2024, the organization counts 103,000 members across over 100 countries.

== Activities ==
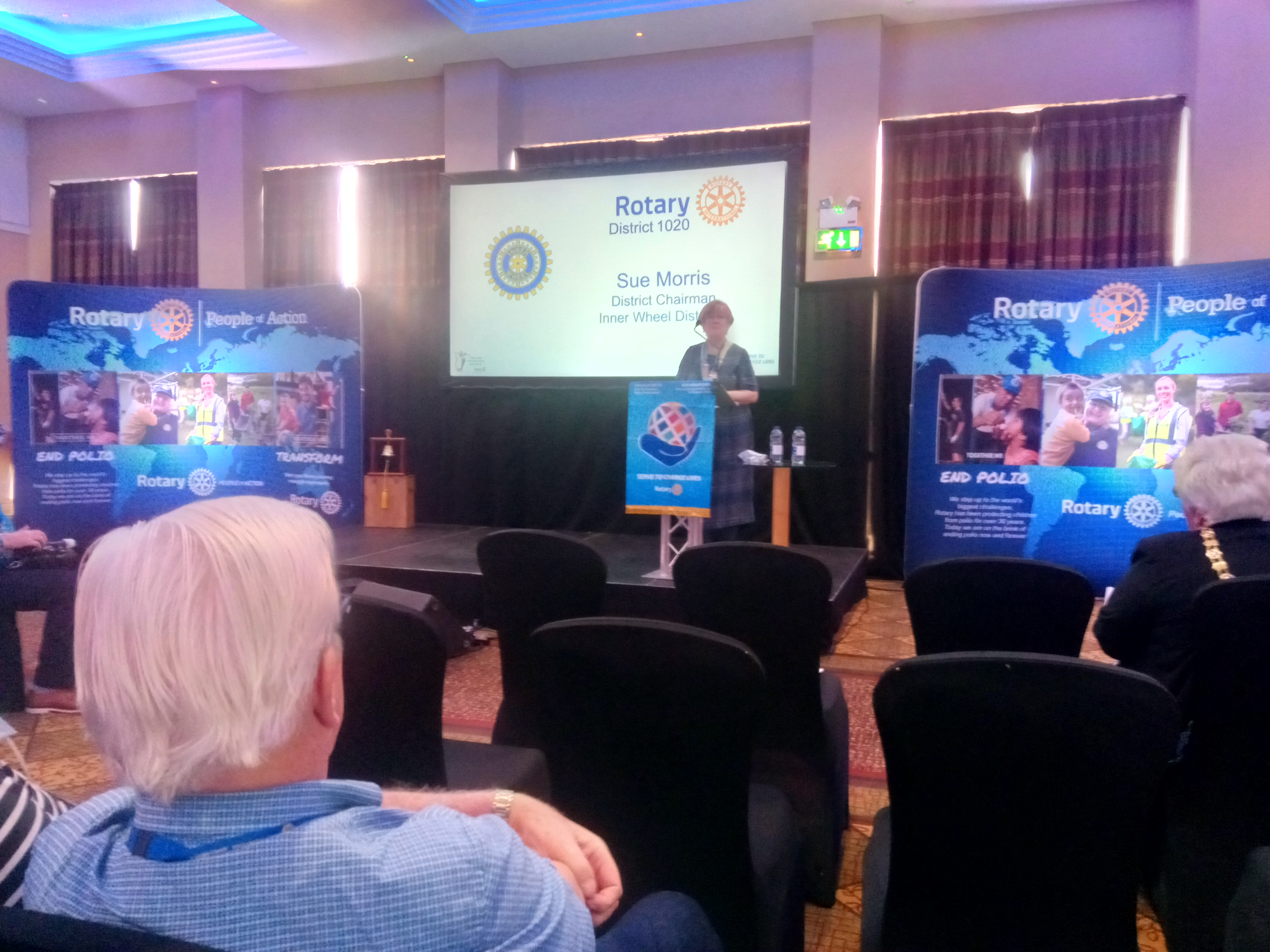
Sue Morris presenting in Scotland, 2021

The shared Inner Wheel objectives are promoting true friendship, encouraging the ideals of personal service, and fostering international understanding but Individual chapters accomplish those goals based on local resources and interest. Socially, groups may meet for lunch or sing karaoke. For supporting charity, support includes raising funds for local hospitals or plant trees. To promote global understanding, groups have hosted a Pan-African forum and celebrated International Women's Day.
