= Clifford Priory =

Priory in Herefordshire, England

Coordinates: 52.0941°N 3.0903°W

Clifford Priory was a priory in Herefordshire, England at grid reference SO2531944576.
