= Hay-on-Wye Bridge =

Coordinates: 52°04′35″N 3°07′38″W

Hay Bridge spans the River Wye at Hay-on-Wye, Powys, Wales.

Preceding the rebuild, the bridge was partly of stone and partly of wood, which itself replaced a stone bridge of seven arches, destroyed by a flood in 1795, and some remains of which form part of the later structure. The toll was taken on this bridge under the authority of an act of Parliament, the Hay Bridge Over Wye Act 1756 (29 Geo. 2. c. 73), which granted that privilege for a term of 98 years, from the first day of August 1763, at the expiration of which the bridge was to be toll-free.

== Early history ==
There is no record of there having been a bridge over the River Wye at Hay, till past the middle of the 18th century. In remote times, the inhabitants of the town and feudal lords of Hay Castle, most likely looked upon the Wye as a serviceable barrier against a sudden incursion of an enemy from that quarter, while for all legitimate purposes, the coracle or the ford would give ample accommodation. But as the people of the district became more civilized, they desired a less primitive means of crossing the river. Public subscriptions were invited, and as a result, a large abutment wall and three piers were built, but then the work stopped for want of funds. The Hay Bridge Over Wye Act 1756 (29 Geo. 2. c. 73) appointed commissioners with powers to erect a bridge and to levy tolls for its maintenance. The following were the commissioners first appointed: Sir Edward Williams; Thomas Beavan, of Court Evan Gwynn, George Devereux, Thomas Hughes; Roger Jones; James Price; William Stephens, clerk; Henry Probert Howarth, clerk; John Jones, apothecary; Hugh Price, John Gwynn, Edward Allen, Henry Wellington, mercer; and Thomas Beavan, of the Court of Clyro. By authority of this act, the commissioners entered into a covenant with Thomas Jones, of Llanthomas, John Harris, of Eardisley, and James Lloyd Harris of the town of Kington, for the erection of a bridge, and granting to them and their heirs a lease of the tolls arising therefrom for a period of 98 years, from 1 October 1768. At the expiration of the term, the bridge would revert to the trustees for the time being. The said Thomas Jones was to pay the expense of procuring the act of Parliament, which cost £278 8s 4d.

The lessees built a stone bridge consisting of seven arches over the Wye, and made the approaches on both sides. In February 1795, the centre part and south end of the bridge was washed away by a great flood, which happened after the breaking up of a long and severe frost. Two arches only were left standing on the Raduorshire side, or north side, of the river. Long before this period the three lessees were dead. After the flood and the falling down of the bridge, James Lloyd Harris (son of one of the lessees) erected a temporary bridge of wood across the river, and continued to receive the tolls. Within the following five years he erected a timber bridge from the Brecknockshire side of the river, to communicate with the two stone arches of the old stone bridge which had been left standing by the flood. This was in contravention to the lease, because a stone bridge should have been erected.
