= Hay's bridge =

Circuit diagram of Hay's bridge. The circuit contains an unknown inductor Lx with series resistance Rx, two resistive arms R2 and R3, and a reference series RC arm (R1, C1).

Hay's bridge is used to determine the Inductance of an inductor with a high Q factor. Maxwell's bridge is only appropriate for measuring the values for inductors with a medium quality factor. Thus, the bridge is the advanced form of Maxwell’s bridge.

One of the arms of a Hay's bridge has an accurately characterized capacitor used to balance the unknown inductance value. The other arms contain resistors.
