= Clifford, Herefordshire =

Village in Herefordshire, England

Coordinates: 52.1047°N 3.1025°W

Clifford
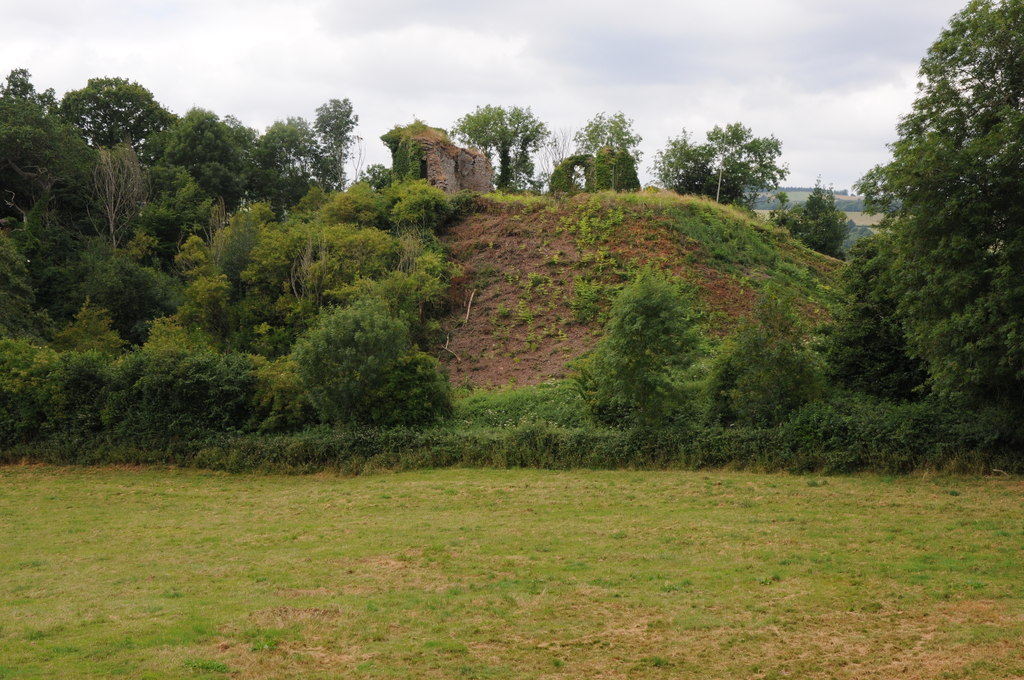
- Clifford Castle

- Location within Herefordshire
- Population: 511 (2011 census)
- OS grid reference: SO243457
  - London: 135 mi (217 km)
- Civil parish: Clifford
- Unitary authority: Herefordshire
- Ceremonial county: Herefordshire
- Region: West Midlands
- Country: England
- Sovereign state: United Kingdom
- Post town: Hereford
- Postcode district: HR3
- Dialling code: 01497
- Police: West Mercia
- Fire: Hereford and Worcester
- Ambulance: West Midlands
- UK Parliament: Hereford and South Herefordshire

Clifford is a village and civil parish in Herefordshire, England, and 2.5 miles (4.0 km) to the north of Hay-on-Wye. It lies on the south bank of the River Wye, which here forms the border between Wales and England. The village sits on the B4350 road. The civil parish includes the hamlets of Priory Wood and Hardwicke.

== History ==
In the 1870s, Clifford was described as:

The village stands on the river Wye, adjacent to the Hereford and Brecon railway, 2 miles NNE of Hay; and has a post office under Hereford. The parish includes also part of Vowmine township. Acres, 6, 522. Real property, £6, 209. Pop., 895. Houses, 207. A castle was built here by W. Fitzosborne; became the seat of the Cliffords of Ugbrooke; and was the birthplace of Jane de Clifford, "Fair Rosamond", the favourite of Henry II.

Adventure and romance novelist Rafael Sabatini, whose works include Captain Blood, The Sea Hawk and Scaramouche, several of which were adapted to movies, lived in Clifford from 1931.

== Landmarks ==
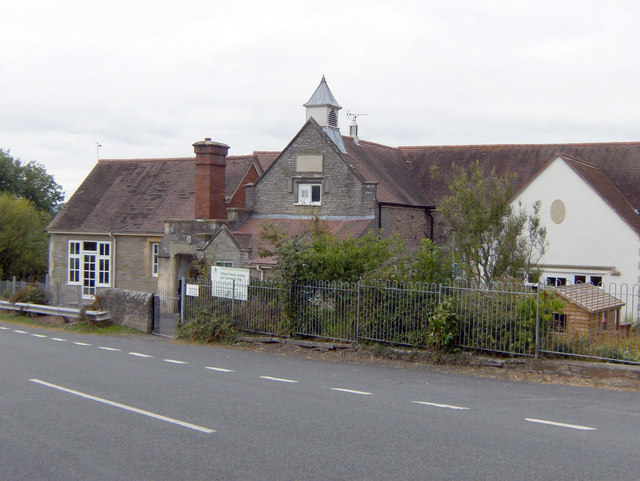
Primary School in Clifford

The ruins of the Norman castle of Clifford Castle are in the village. The castle is a "traditional motte and bailey castle" which stands next to the River Wye on the border between England and Wales, it "covers an area in excess of 4 acres". It was founded by Earl William Fitz Osbern between the time of his being made Earl of Heredford in 1066 and his death in 1071. "Clifford Castle is one of five castles mentioned in the Domesday Survey of 1086." The castle is alongside a steep drop to the River Wye close to a ford, therefore "this gave the site its later name, the cliff by the ford or Clifford". Originally the castle protected a settlement housing up to 200 families, although today Clifford is only a small village.

The village parish church, dedicated to St Mary, is located to the south east of the village, having originally been part of Clifford Priory. It is built in Norman style and was restored in 1888. The nave dates from the 13th century, with the tower having been rebuilt in the 18th century. The interior contains a number of monuments.

== Education ==
Clifford Primary School, a community school built in 1837, is 3 miles (5 km) miles from Hay-on-Wye and close to the Black Mountains. The school's Ofsted report from 10 October 2012 states an attendance of 71 children aged 4 to 11 (Year R to Year 6); the school received a 'good' rating. The school has been given the Eco Schools Green Flag Award.

== Demography ==
=== Population ===
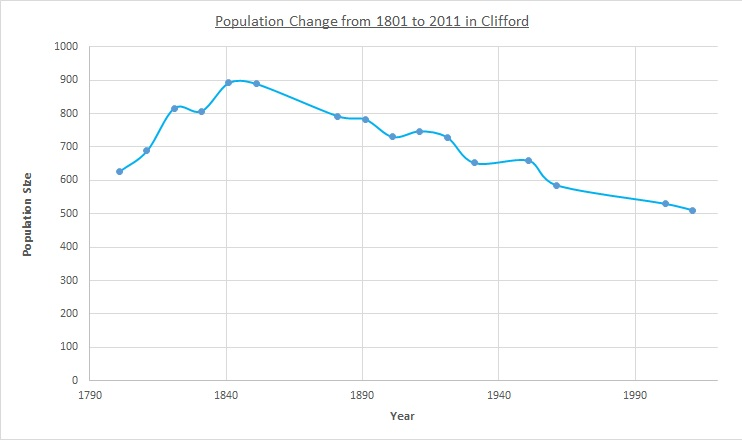
A graph to show the total population change in Clifford between 1801 and 2011 as reported by the Census of population.

The population graph shows an increase in population up until 1840 when the population of Clifford began to decrease. The movement of people away from rural areas in the early 19th century was due to technical advances and socio-economic changes leading to urban areas becoming more densely populated. The technical advances meant that fewer people were needed in the agricultural industry, and this allowed people to move into towns and cities and begin to work for the labour industry. Therefore, this continuous decrease in population resulted in an overall net decrease from 1801 to 2011.

Neighbourhood statistics show that from 2001 and 2011 there has been an overall decrease in population from 530 to 511 people, although statistics show that there has been an increase in the ageing population from 287 people aged over 45 in 2001 to 296 people aged over 45 in 2011.

=== Occupation ===
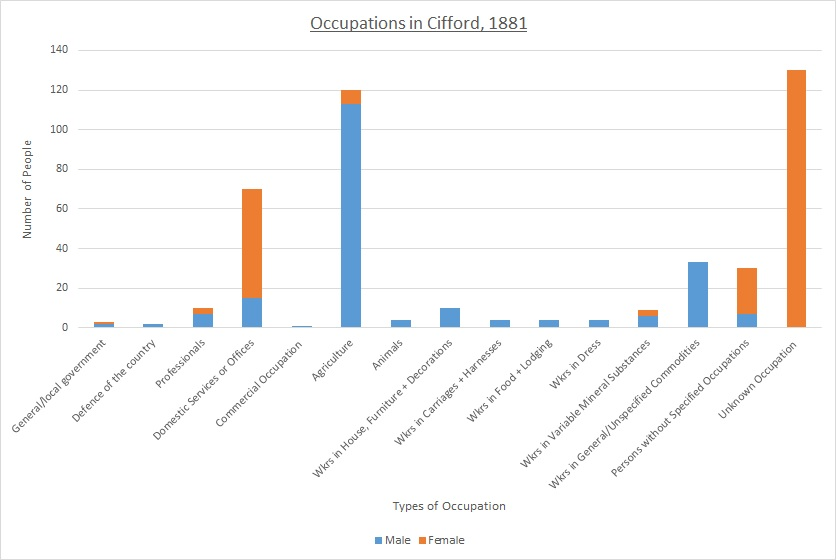
Occupation data classified into the 24 1881 'Orders', plus sex, A Vision of Britain through Time

1881 occupations The 1881 occupations graph shows that males dominated the workforce with the agricultural industry as well as many other types of jobs including 'workers in house, furniture and decorations' and 'workers in dress'. Although women are perceived not to have a working life, they still dominated the 'domestic services or offices' working sector with a small minority of women appearing in the general/local government and professional line of works.

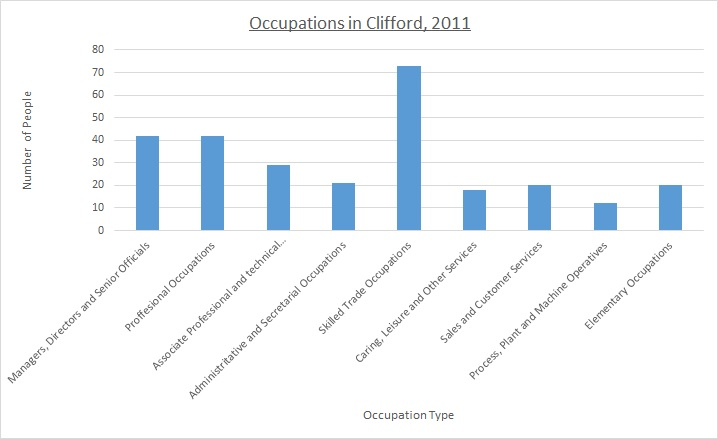
Occupations in Clifford, 2011

2011 occupations The 2011 Occupations graph shows a contrast in the types of jobs the villagers have. There is a significant increase in the number of professional and office based jobs that are distributed around the villagers. There is a significant lower number of agricultural jobs, which may be due to the introduction of farming machinery meaning that there is less space for a large number of agricultural farmers.
