= Castles in Great Britain and Ireland =

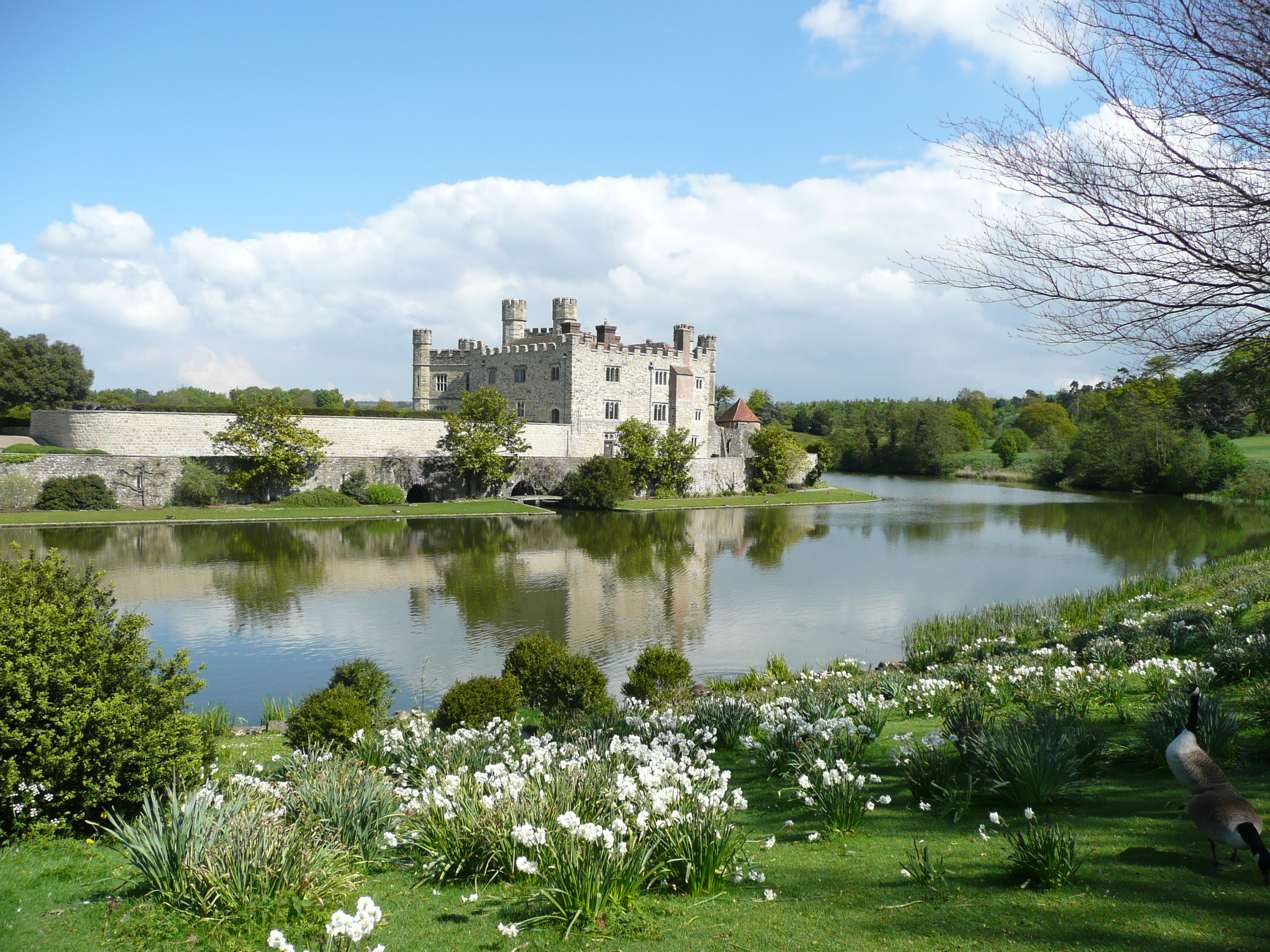
Leeds Castle, England

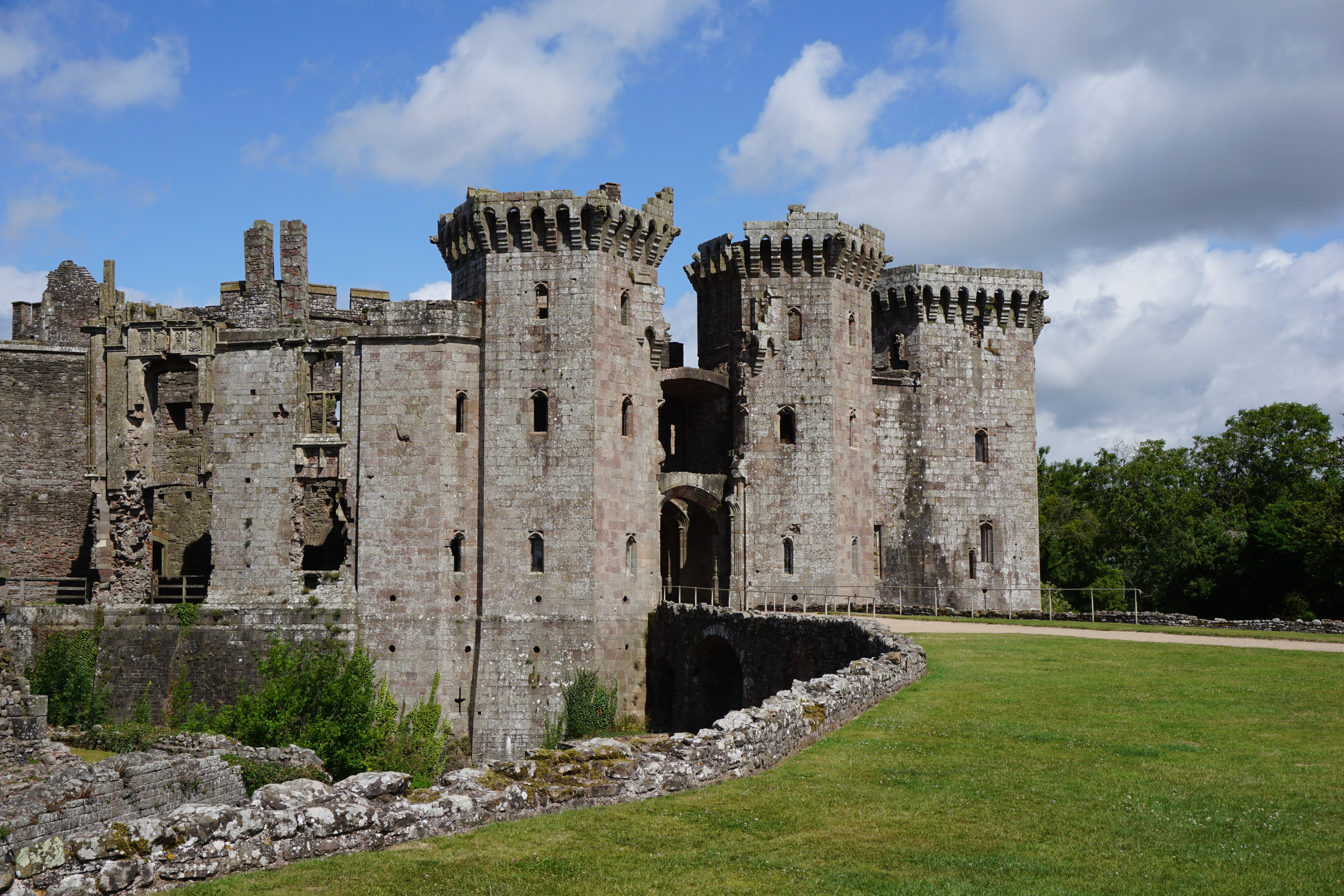
Raglan Castle, Wales

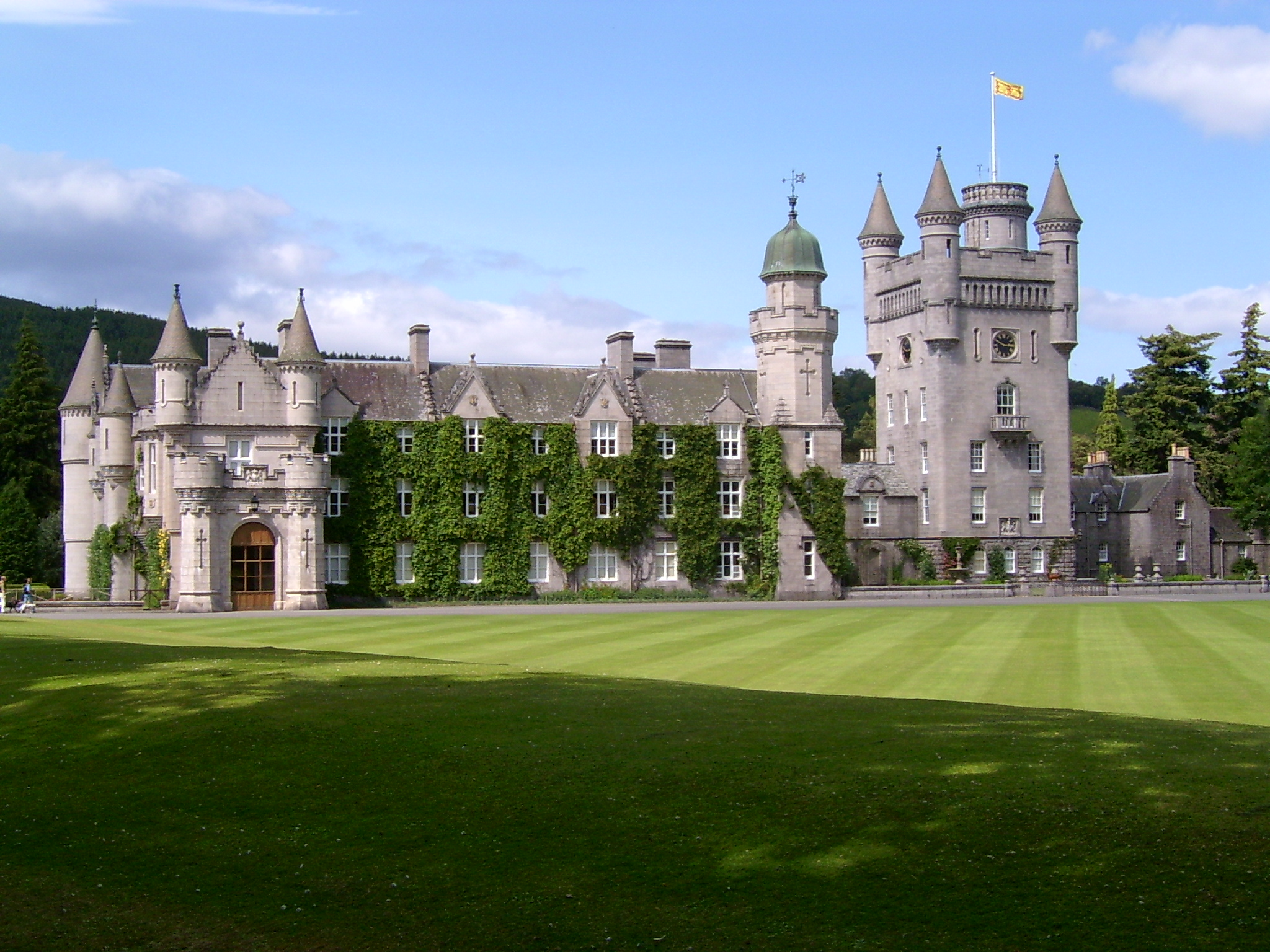
Balmoral Castle, Scotland

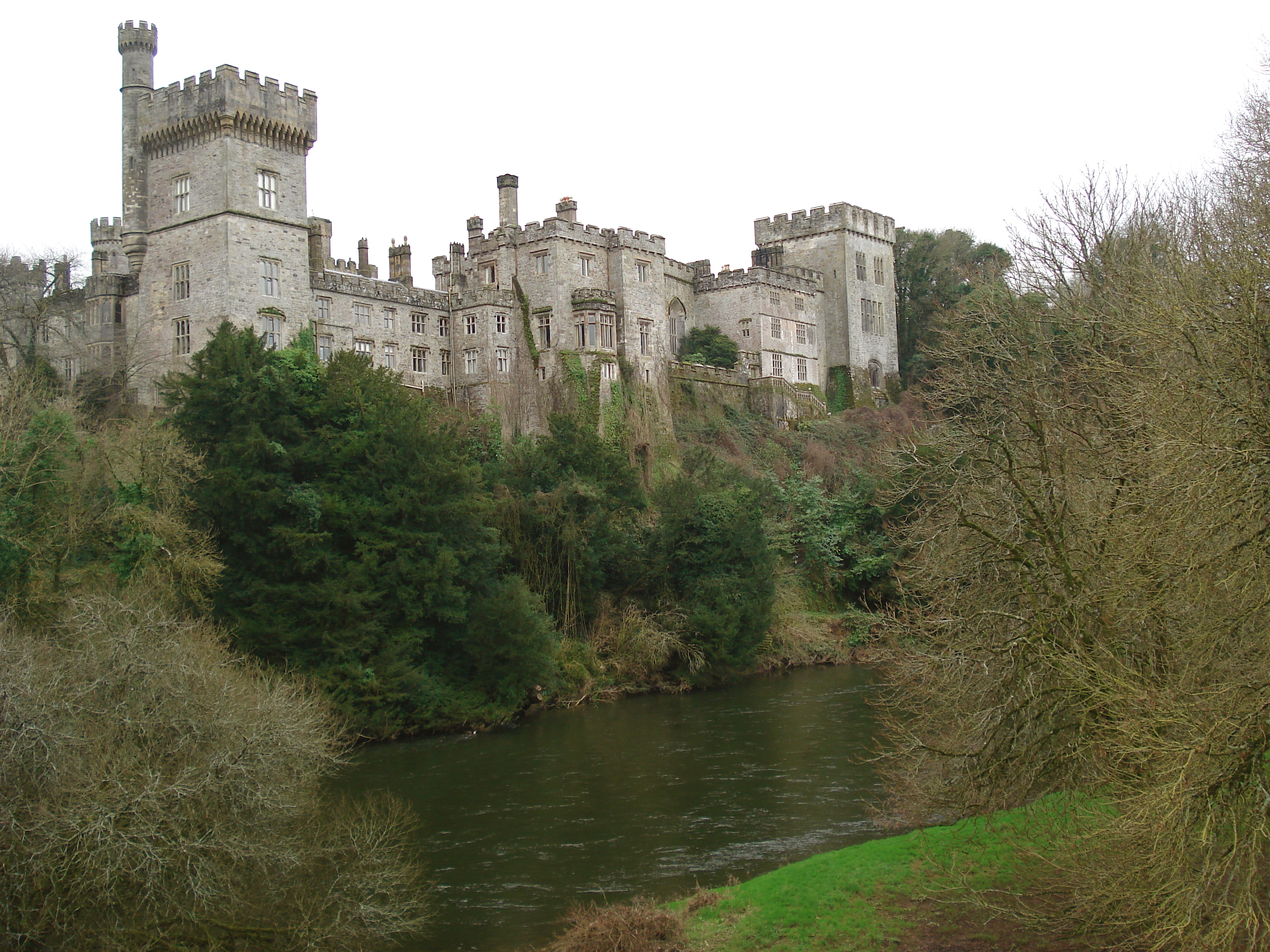
Lismore Castle, Ireland

Castles have played an important military, economic and social role in Great Britain and Ireland since their introduction following the Norman invasion of England in 1066. Although a small number of castles had been built in England in the 1050s, the Normans began to build motte and bailey and ringwork castles in large numbers to control their newly occupied territories in England and the Welsh Marches. During the 12th century the Normans began to build more castles in stone – with characteristic square keep – that played both military and political roles. Royal castles were used to control key towns and the economically important forests, while baronial castles were used by the Norman lords to control their widespread estates. David I invited Anglo-Norman lords into Scotland in the early 12th century to help him colonise and control areas of his kingdom such as Galloway; the new lords brought castle technologies with them and wooden castles began to be established over the south of the kingdom. Following the Norman invasion of Ireland in the 1170s, under Henry II, castles were established there too.

Castles continued to grow in military sophistication and comfort during the 12th century, leading to a sharp increase in the complexity and length of sieges in England. While in Ireland and Wales castle architecture continued to follow that of England, after the death of Alexander III the trend in Scotland moved away from the construction of larger castles towards the use of smaller tower houses. The tower house style would also be adopted in the north of England and Ireland in later years. In North Wales Edward I built a sequence of militarily powerful castles after the destruction of the last Welsh polities in the 1270s. By the 14th century castles were combining defences with luxurious, sophisticated living arrangements and heavily landscaped gardens and parks.

Many royal and baronial castles were left to decline, so that by the 15th century only a few were maintained for defensive purposes. A small number of castles in England and Scotland were developed into Renaissance Era palaces that hosted lavish feasts and celebrations amid their elaborate architecture. Such structures were beyond the means of all but royalty and the richest of the late-medieval barons. Although gunpowder weapons were used to defend castles from the late 14th century onwards it became clear during the 16th century that, provided artillery could be transported and brought to bear on a besieged castle, gunpowder weapons could also play an important attack role. The defences of coastal castles around the British Isles were improved to deal with this threat, but investment in their upkeep once again declined at the end of the 16th century. Nevertheless, in the widespread civil and religious conflicts across the British Isles during the 1640s and 1650s, castles played a key role in England. Modern defences were quickly built alongside existing medieval fortifications and, in many cases, castles successfully withstood more than one siege. In Ireland the introduction of heavy siege artillery by Oliver Cromwell in 1649 brought a rapid end to the utility of castles in the war, while in Scotland the popular tower houses proved unsuitable for defending against civil war artillery – although major castles such as Edinburgh put up strong resistance. At the end of the war many castles were slighted to prevent future use.

Military use of castles rapidly decreased over subsequent years, although some were adapted for use by garrisons in Scotland and key border locations for many years to come, including during the Second World War. Other castles were used as county jails, until parliamentary legislation in the 19th closed most of them down. For a period in the early 18th century, castles were shunned in favour of Palladian architecture, until they re-emerged as an important cultural and social feature of England, Wales and Scotland and were frequently "improved" during the 18th and 19th centuries. Such renovations raised concerns over their protection so that today castles across the British Isles are safeguarded by legislation. Primarily used as tourist attractions, castles form a key part of the national heritage industry. Historians and archaeologists continue to develop our understanding of British castles, while vigorous academic debates in recent years have questioned the interpretation of physical and documentary material surrounding their original construction and use.

== Norman Invasion ==
=== Earlier castles and fortifications ===
The English word "castle" derives from the Latin word castellum and is used to refer to the private fortified residence of a lord or noble. The term tends not to be used for buildings earlier than the 11th century, but such defensive structures are known to have existed before the Norman conquest. A lack of archaeological evidence for timber buildings has tended to disguise the extent of castle-building throughout Europe prior to 1066, and many of the early wooden castles were built on the site of earlier fortifications.

Before the arrival of the Normans the Anglo-Saxons had built burhs, fortified structures with their origins in 9th-century Wessex. Most of these, especially in urban areas, were large enough to be best described as fortified townships rather than private dwellings and are therefore not usually classed as castles. Rural burhs were smaller and usually consisted of a wooden hall with a wall enclosing various domestic buildings along with an entrance tower called a burh-geat, which was apparently used for ceremonial purposes. Although rural burhs were relatively secure their role was primarily ceremonial and they too are not normally classed as castles.

The presence of castles in Britain and Ireland dates primarily from the Norman invasion of 1066. There were, however, a small number of castles built in England during the 1050s, by Norman knights in the service of Edward the Confessor. These include Hereford, Clavering, Richard's Castle and possibly Ewyas Harold Castle and Dover. (Note: The construction of English castles in the 1050s depends primarily on one specific medieval documentary source, and there is considerable debate over the reliability of this and the consequent dating of these castles.)

=== Invasion ===
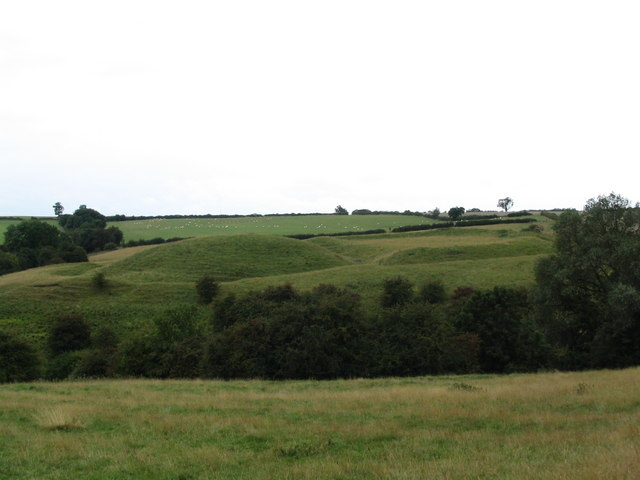
Hallaton Castle in Leicestershire, England, showing a well preserved post-invasion earth motte (l) and bailey (r)

William, Duke of Normandy, invaded England in 1066 and one of his first actions after landing was to build Pevensey Castle in September 1066 (re-using the Roman Saxon Shore fort of Anderitum), Hastings Castle to protect his supply routes (prior to the Battle of Hastings), and Dover Castle. Following their victory at the battle of Hastings the Normans began three phases of castle building. The first of these was the establishment, by the new king, of a number of royal castles in key strategic locations. This royal castle programme focused on controlling the towns and cities of England and the associated lines of communication, including Cambridge, Huntingdon, Lincoln, Norwich, Nottingham, Wallingford, Warwick and York. Of the castles built by William the Conqueror two-thirds were built in towns and cities, often those with the former Anglo-Saxon mints. These urban castles could make use of the existing town's walls and fortifications, but typically required the demolition of local houses to make space for them. This could cause extensive damage, and records suggest that in Lincoln 166 houses were destroyed, with 113 in Norwich and 27 in Cambridge. Some of these castles were deliberately built on top of important local buildings, such as the burhs or halls of local nobles, and might be constructed so as to imitate aspects of the previous buildings – such as the gatehouse at Rougemont Castle in Exeter, which closely resembled the previous Anglo-Saxon burh tower – this was probably done to demonstrate to the local population that they now answered to their new Norman rulers.

The second and third waves of castle building were led by the major magnates, and then by the more junior knights on their new estates. The apportionment of the conquered lands by the king influenced where these castles were built. In a few key locations the king gave his followers compact groups of estates including the six rapes of Sussex and the three earldoms of Chester, Shrewsbury and Hereford; intended to protect the line of communication with Normandy and the Welsh border respectively. In these areas a baron's castles were clustered relatively tightly together, but in most of England the nobles' estates, and therefore their castles, were more widely dispersed. As the Normans pushed on into South Wales they advanced up the valleys building castles as they went and often using the larger castles of the neighbouring earldoms as a base.

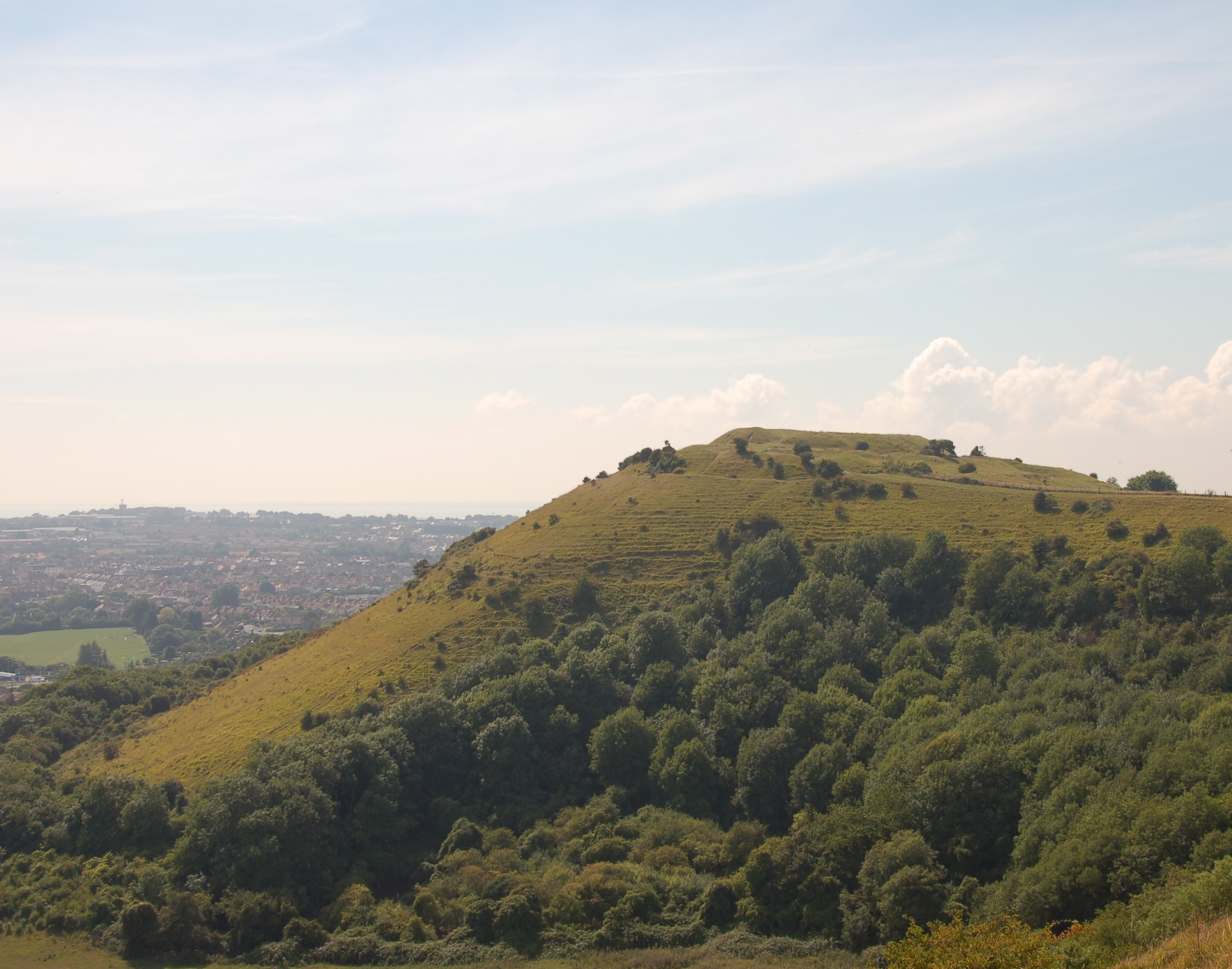
Folkestone Castle in England, a Norman ringwork castle

As a result, castle building by the Norman nobility across England and the Marches lacked a grand strategic plan, reflecting local circumstances such as military factors and the layout of existing estates and church lands. Castles were often situated along the old Roman roads that still formed the backbone for travel across the country, both to control the lines of communication and to ensure easy movement between different estates. Many castles were built close to inland river ports and those built on the coast were usually located at the mouths of rivers or in ports, Pevensey and Portchester being rare exceptions. (Note: Changes in river patterns have meant that many of these inland locations are no longer ports in the 21st century.) Some groups of castles were located so as to be mutually reinforcing – for example the castles of Littledean Camp, Glasshouse Woods and Howle Hill Camp were intended to act as an integrated defence for the area around Gloucester and Gloucester Castle for Gloucester city itself, while Windsor was one of a ring of castles built around London, each approximately a day's march apart. Some regional patterns in castle building can also be seen – relatively few castles were built in East Anglia compared to the west of England or the Marches; this was probably due to the relatively settled and prosperous nature of the east of England and reflected a shortage of available serfs, or unfree labour. Not all of the castles were occupied simultaneously. Some were built during the invasions and then abandoned while other new castles were constructed elsewhere, especially along the western borders. Recent estimates suggest that between 500 and 600 castles were occupied at any one time in the post-conquest period.

=== Architecture ===
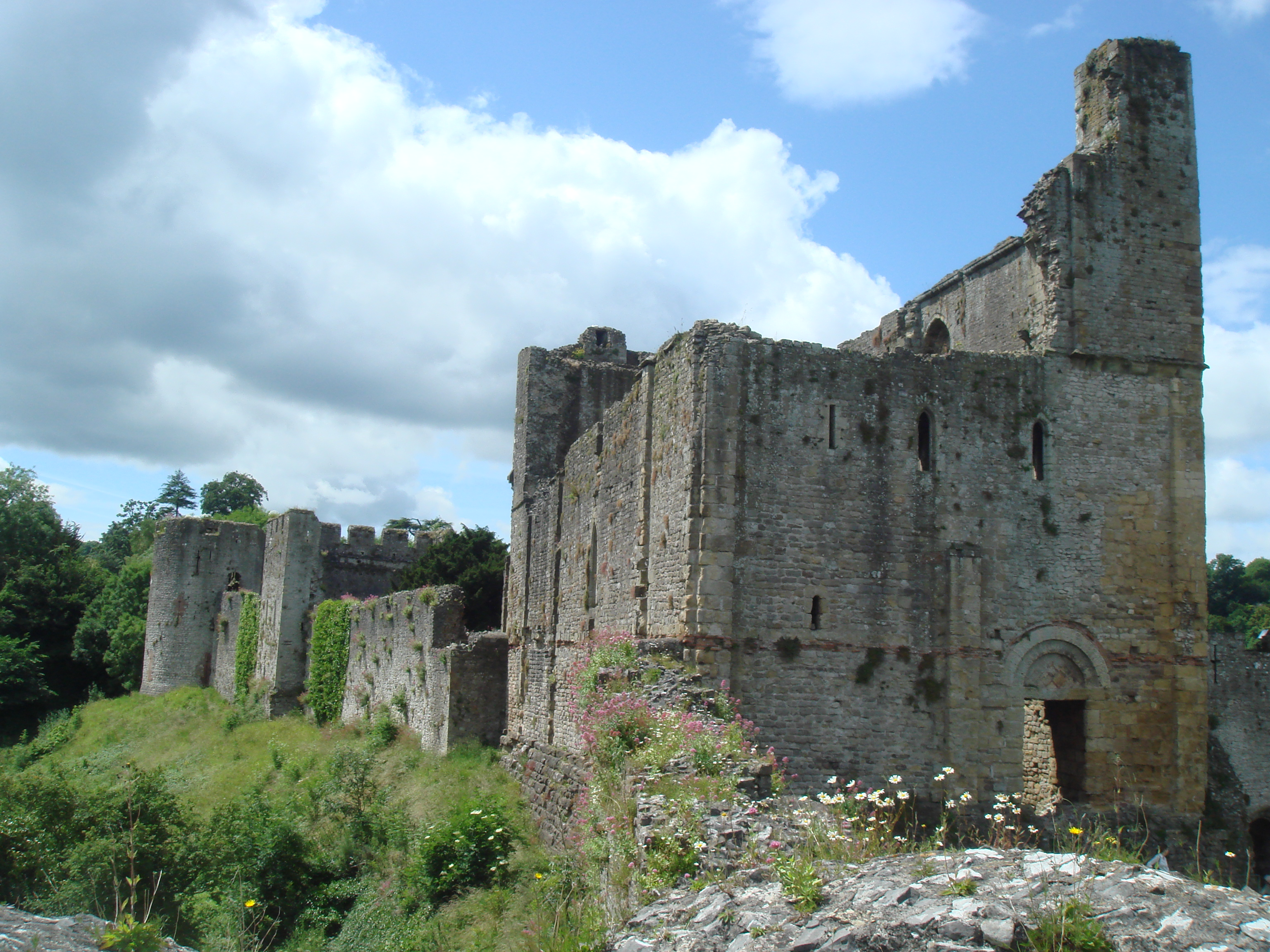
The stone keep of Chepstow Castle in Wales, built in a Romanesque style

There was a large degree of variation in the size and exact shape of the castles built in England and Wales after the invasion. One popular form was the motte and bailey, in which earth would be piled up into a mound (called a motte) to support a wooden tower, and a wider enclosed area built alongside it (called a bailey); Stafford Castle is a typical example of a post-invasion motte castle. Another widespread design was the ring work in which earth would be built up in a circular or oval shape and topped with a wooden rampart; Folkestone Castle is a good example of a Norman ring work, in this case built on top of a hill although most post-invasion castles were usually sited on lower ground. Around 80 per cent of Norman castles in this period followed the motte-and-bailey pattern, but ring works were particularly popular in certain areas, such as south-west England and south Wales. One theory put forward to explain this variation is that ringworks were easier to build in these shallow-soil areas than the larger mottes.

The White Tower in London and the keep of Colchester Castle were the only stone castles to be built in England immediately after the conquest, both with the characteristic square Norman keep. Both these castles were built in the Romanesque style and were intended to impress as well as provide military protection. In Wales the first wave of the Norman castles were again made of wood, in a mixture of motte-and-bailey and ringwork designs, with the exception of the stone built Chepstow Castle. Chepstow too was heavily influenced by Romanesque design, reusing numerous materials from the nearby Venta Silurum to produce what historian Robert Liddiard has termed "a play upon images from Antiquity".

The size of these castles varied depending on the geography of the site, the decisions of the builder and the available resources. Analysis of the size of mottes has shown some distinctive regional variation; East Anglia, for example, saw much larger mottes being built than the Midlands or London. While motte-and-bailey and ring-work castles took great effort to build, they required relatively few skilled craftsmen allowing them to be raised using forced labour from the local estates; this, in addition to the speed with which they could be built – a single season, made them particularly attractive immediately after the conquest. The larger earthworks, particularly mottes, required an exponentially greater quantity of manpower than their smaller equivalents and consequently tended to be either royal, or belong to the most powerful barons who could muster the required construction effort. Despite motte-and-bailey and ringworks being common designs amongst Norman castles, each fortification was slightly different – some castles were designed with two baileys attached to a single motte, and some ring works were built with additional towers added on; yet other castles were built as ringworks and later converted to motte-and-bailey structures.

== 12th century ==
=== Developments in castle design ===
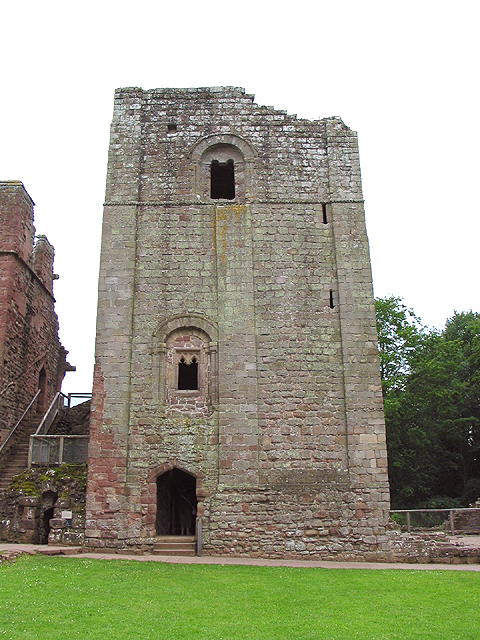
The Norman square keep of Goodrich Castle in Herefordshire in England, with the original first-floor doorway still visible above its later replacement

From the early 12th century onwards the Normans began to build new castles in stone and convert existing timber designs. This was initially a slow process, picking up speed towards the second half of the century. Traditionally this transition was believed to have been driven by the more crude nature of wooden fortifications, the limited life of timber in wooden castles and its vulnerability to fire; recent archaeological studies have however shown that many wooden castles were as robust and as complex as their stone equivalents. Some wooden castles were not converted into stone for many years and instead expanded in wood, such as at Hen Domen.

Several early stone keeps had been built after the conquest, with somewhere between ten and fifteen in existence by 1100, and more followed in the 12th century until around 100 had been built by 1216. (Note: The word "keep" can be open to criticism. In the medieval period, keeps were referred to as a dungeon, from the French donjon, or in Latin as turris, turris castri or magna turris – a tower, or a castle tower, or a great tower. The word "keep" becomes used from the 16th century onwards. The ambiguity over the contemporary terminology has made analysis of the historical value and use of keeps somewhat problematic.) Typically these were four sided designs with the corners reinforced by pilaster buttresses. Keeps were up to four storeys high, with the entrance on the first storey to prevent the door from being easily broken down. The strength of the design typically came from the thickness of the walls: usually made of rag-stone, as in the case of Dover Castle, these walls could be up to 24 feet (7.3 metres) thick. The larger keeps were subdivided by an internal wall while the smaller versions, such as that at Goodrich, had a single, slightly cramped chamber on each floor. Stone keeps required skilled craftsmen to build them; unlike unfree labour or serfs, these men had to be paid and stone keeps were therefore expensive. They were also relatively slow to erect – a keep's walls could usually only be raised by a maximum of 12 feet (3.7 metres) a year, the keep at Scarborough was typical in taking ten years to build.

Norman stone keeps played both a military and a political role. Most of the keeps were physically extremely robust and, while they were not designed as an intended location for the final defence of a castle, they were often placed near weak points in the walls to provide supporting fire. Many keeps made compromises to purely military utility: Norwich Castle included elaborate blind arcading on the outside of the building, in a Roman style, and appears to have had a ceremonial entrance route. The interior of the keep at Hedingham could have hosted impressive ceremonies and events, but contained numerous flaws from a military perspective. Similarly there has been extensive debate over the role of Orford Castle whose expensive, three-cornered design most closely echoes imperial Byzantine palaces and may have been intended by Henry II to be more symbolic than military in nature. (Note: The academic argument over the nature of 12th-century keeps occurs around several issues. The earlier analyses of Norman keeps had focused on their military design, and historians such as Cathcart King had proposed a chronology in which square keeps gave way to circular fortifications, with some intervening designs such as at Orford. Historians such as Robert Liddiard have argued strongly that weaknesses in the design of these keeps, combined with their symbolic features, indicates that they had a less military, and more political role. Richard Hulme and Peter Purton have argued that while Norman keeps may well have had an important political and symbolic role, until the development of the trebuchet the military weaknesses identified by Liddiard were not significant.)

Another improvement from the 12th century onwards was the creation of shell keeps, involving replacing the wooden keep on the motte with a circular stone wall. Buildings could be built around the inside of the shell, producing a small inner courtyard. Restormel Castle is a classic example of this development with a perfectly circular wall and a square entrance tower while the later Launceston Castle, although more ovoid than circular, is another good example of the design and one of the most formidable castles of the period. Round castles were unusually popular throughout Cornwall and Devon. Although the circular design held military advantages, these only really mattered in the 13th century onwards; the origins of 12th-century circular design were the circular design of the mottes; indeed, some designs were less than circular in order to accommodate irregular mottes, such as that at Windsor Castle.

=== Economy and society ===
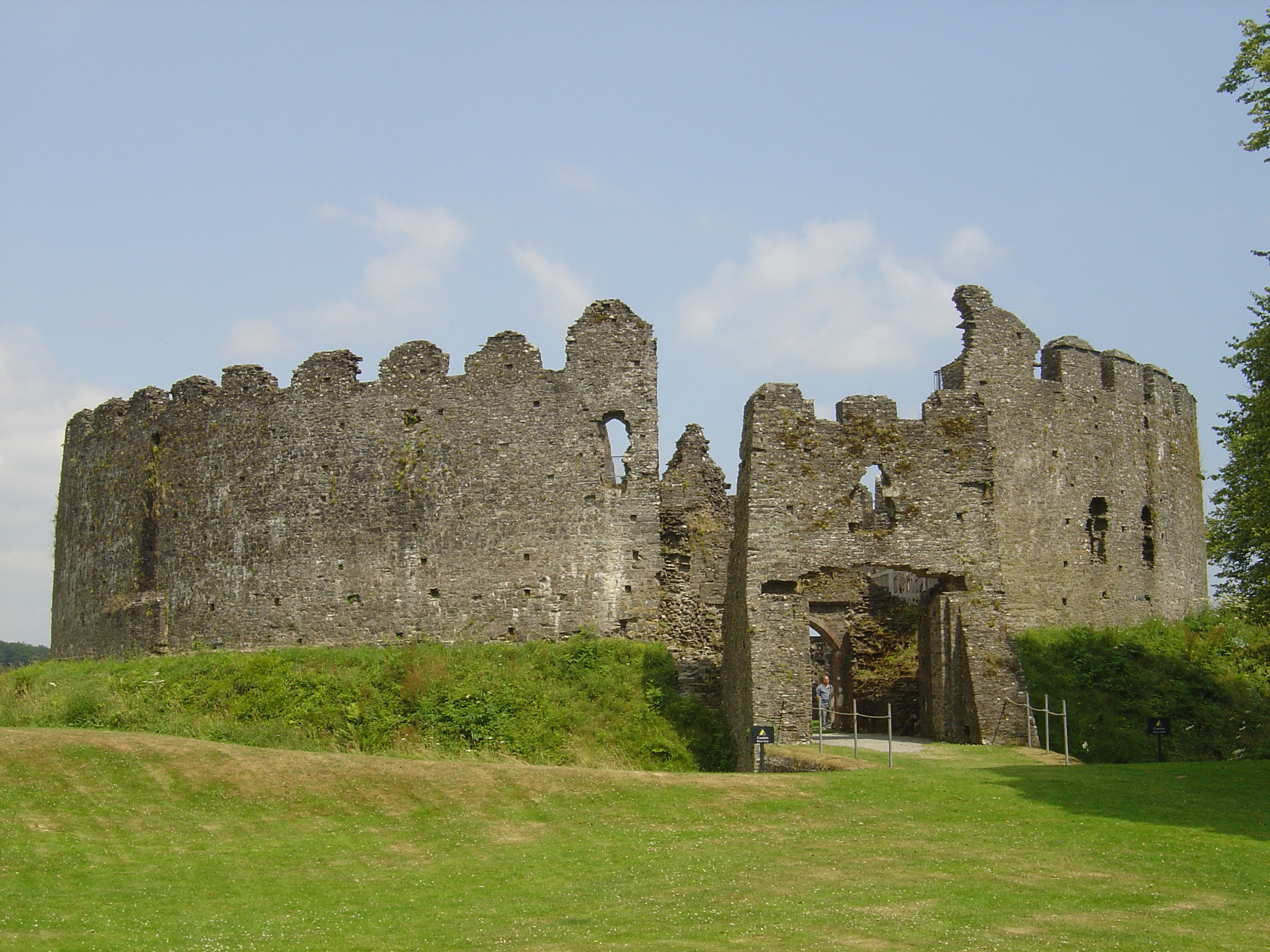
The shell keep of Restormel Castle in Cornwall in England

English castles during the period were divided into those royal castles owned by the king, and baronial castles controlled by the Anglo-Norman lords. According to chronicler William of Newburgh royal castles formed the "bones of the kingdom". A number of royal castles were also designated as shrieval castles, forming the administrative hub for a particular county – for example Winchester Castle served as the centre of Hampshire. These castles formed a base for the royal sheriff, responsible for enforcing royal justice in the relevant shire; the role of the sheriff became stronger and clearer as the century progressed.

A number of royal castles were linked to forests and other key resources. Royal forests in the early medieval period were subject to special royal jurisdiction; forest law was, as historian Robert Huscroft describes it, "harsh and arbitrary, a matter purely for the King's will" and forests were expected to supply the king with hunting grounds, raw materials, goods and money. Forests were typically tied to castles, both to assist with the enforcement of the law and to store the goods being extracted from the local economy: Peveril Castle was linked to the Peak Forest and the local lead mining there; St Briavels was tied to the Forest of Dean; and Knaresborough, Rockingham and Pickering to their eponymous forests respectively. In the south-west, where the Crown oversaw the lead mining industry, castles such as Restormel played an important role running the local stannery courts.

Baronial castles were of varying size and sophistication; some were classed as a caput baroniae, or the key stronghold of a given lord, and were usually larger and better fortified than the norm and usually held the local baronial honorial courts. The king continued to exercise the right to occupy and use any castle in the kingdom in response to external threats, in those cases he would staff the occupied castles with his own men; the king also retained the right to authorise the construction of new castles through the issuing of licenses to crenellate. It was possible for bishops to build or control castles, such as the important Devizes Castle linked to the Bishop of Salisbury, although this practice was challenged on occasion. In the 12th century the practice of castle-guards emerged in England and Wales, under which lands were assigned to local lords on condition that the recipient provided a certain number of knights or sergeants for the defence of a named castle. In some cases, such as at Dover, this arrangement became quite sophisticated with particular castle towers being named after particular families owing castle-guard duty.

The links between castles and the surrounding lands and estates was particularly important during this period. Many castles, both royal and baronial, had deer parks or chases attached to them for the purposes of hunting. These usually stretched away from the village or borough associated with the castle, but occasionally a castle was placed in the centre of a park, such as at Sandal.

=== The Anarchy ===
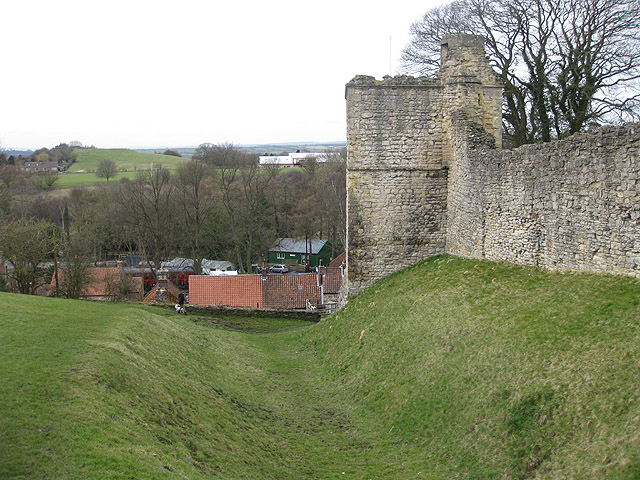
Pickering Castle in England (right), and the counter-castle from the years of the Anarchy (upper left)

Civil war broke out in England and raged between 1139 and 1153, forming a turbulent period in which the rival factions of King Stephen and the Empress Matilda struggled for power. Open battles were relatively rare during the war, with campaigns instead centred on a sequence of raids and sieges as commanders attempted to gain control over the vital castles that controlled the territory in the rival regions. Siege technology during the Anarchy centred on basic stone-throwing machines such as ballistae and mangonels, supported by siege towers and mining, combined with blockade and, occasionally, direct assault. The phase of the conflict known as "the Castle War" saw both sides attempting to defeat each other through sieges, such as Stephen's attempts to take Wallingford, the most easterly fortress in Matilda's push towards London, or Geoffrey de Mandeville's attempts to seize East Anglia by taking Cambridge Castle.

Both sides responded to the challenge of the conflict by building many new castles, sometimes as sets of strategic fortifications. In the south-west Matilda's supporters built a range of castles to protect the territory, usually motte and bailey designs such as those at Winchcombe, Upper Slaughter, or Bampton. Similarly, Stephen built a new chain of fen-edge castles at Burwell, Lidgate, Rampton, Caxton, and Swavesey – all about six to nine miles (10–15 km) apart – in order to protect his lands around Cambridge. Many of these castles were termed "adulterine" (unauthorised), because no formal permission was given for their construction. Contemporary chroniclers saw this as a matter of concern; Robert of Torigny suggested that as many as 1,115 such castles had been built during the conflict, although this was probably an exaggeration as elsewhere he suggests an alternative figure of 126. Another feature of the war was the creation of many "counter-castles". These had been used in English conflicts for several years before the civil war and involved building a basic castle during a siege, alongside the main target of attack. Typically these would be built in either a ringwork or a motte-and-bailey design between 200 and 300 yards (180 and 270 metres) away from the target, just beyond the range of a bow. Counter-castles could be used to either act as firing platforms for siege weaponry, or as bases for controlling the region in their own right. Most counter-castles were destroyed after their use but in some cases the earthworks survived, such as the counter-castles called Jew's Mount and Mount Pelham built by Stephen in 1141 outside Oxford Castle.

Matilda's son Henry II assumed the throne at the end of the war and immediately announced his intention to eliminate the adulterine castles that had sprung up during the war, but it is unclear how successful this effort was. Robert of Torigny recorded that 375 were destroyed, without giving the details behind the figure; recent studies of selected regions have suggested that fewer castles were probably destroyed than once thought and that many may simply have been abandoned at the end of the conflict. Certainly many of the new castles were transitory in nature: Archaeologist Oliver Creighton observes that 56 per cent of those castles known to have been built during Stephen's reign have "entirely vanished".

=== The spread of castles in Scotland, Wales and Ireland ===
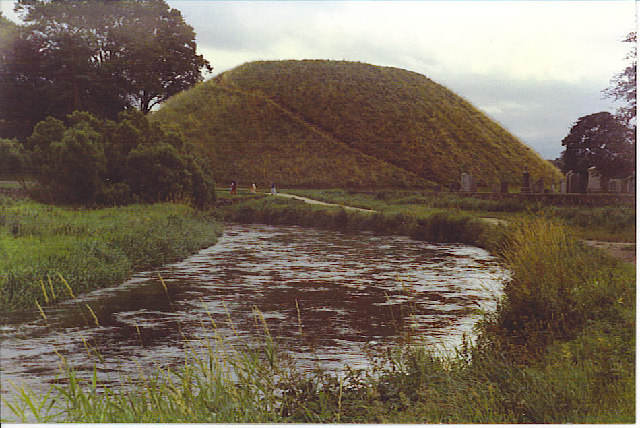
The Bass of Inverurie in Scotland, a large motte and bailey castle built in the mid-12th century

Castles in Scotland emerged as a consequence of the centralising of royal authority in the 12th century. Prior to the 1120s there is very little evidence of castles having existed in Scotland, which had remained less politically centralised than in England with the north still ruled by the kings of Norway. David I of Scotland spent time at the court of Henry I in the south, until he became the Earl of Huntingdon, and returned to Scotland with the intention of extending royal power across the country and modernising Scotland's military technology, including the introduction of castles. The Scottish king encouraged Norman and French nobles to settle in Scotland, introducing a feudal mode of landholding and the use of castles as a way of controlling the contested lowlands. The quasi-independent polity of Galloway, which had resisted the rule of David and his predecessors, was a particular focus for this colonisation. The size of these Scottish castles, primarily wooden motte-and-bailey constructions, varied considerably from larger designs, such as the Bass of Inverurie, to smaller castles like Balmaclellan. As historian Lise Hull has suggested, the creation of castles in Scotland was "less to do with conquest" and more to do with "establishing a governing system".

The Norman expansion into Wales slowed in the 12th century, but remained an ongoing threat to the remaining native rulers. In response the Welsh princes and lords began to build their own castles, usually in wood. There are indications that this may have begun from 1111 onwards under Prince Cadwgan ap Bleddyn with the first documentary evidence of a native Welsh castle being at Cymmer in 1116. These timber castles, including Tomen y Rhodwydd, Tomen y Faerdre and Gaer Penrhôs, were of equivalent quality to the Norman fortifications in the area and it can prove difficult to distinguish the builders of some sites from the archaeological evidence alone. At the end of the 12th century the Welsh rulers began to build castles in stone, primarily in the principality of North Wales.

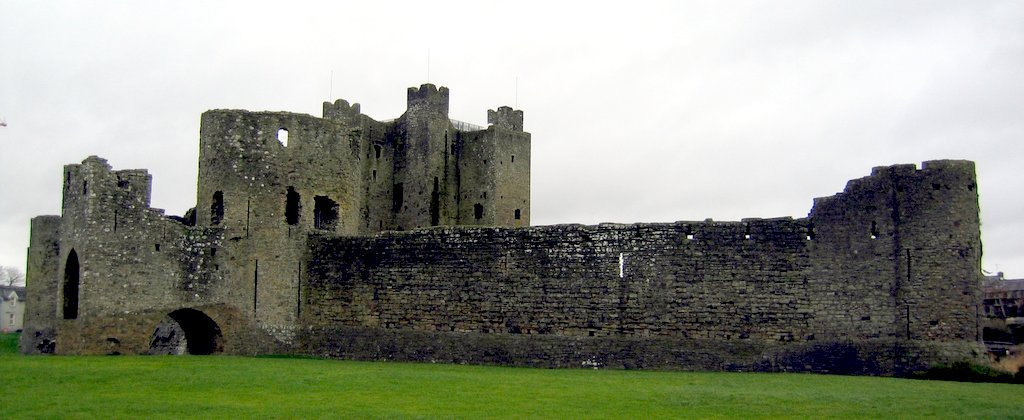
Trim Castle in Ireland, built immediately after the Norman invasion

Ireland remained ruled by native kings into the 12th century, largely without the use of castles. There was a history of Irish fortifications called ráths, a type of ringfort, some of which were very heavily defended but which are not usually considered to be castles in the usual sense of the word. The kings of Connacht constructed fortifications from 1124 which they called caistel or caislen, from the Latin and French for castle, and there has been considerable academic debate over how far these resembled European castles.

The Norman invasion of Ireland began between 1166 and 1171, under first Richard de Clare and then Henry II of England, with the occupation of southern and eastern Ireland by a number of Anglo-Norman barons. The rapid Norman success depended on key economic and military advantages, with castles enabling them to control the newly conquered territories. The new lords rapidly built castles to protect their possessions, many of these were motte-and-bailey constructions; in Louth at least 23 of these were built. It remains uncertain how many ringwork castles were built in Ireland by the Anglo-Normans. Other castles, such as Trim and Carrickfergus, were built in stone as the caput centres for major barons. Analysis of these stone castles suggests that building in stone was not simply a military decision; indeed, several of the castles contain serious defensive flaws. Instead the designs, including their focus on large stone keeps, were intended both to increase the prestige of the baronial owners and to provide adequate space for the administrative apparatus of the new territories. Unlike in Wales the indigenous Irish lords do not appear to have constructed their own castles in any significant number during the period. (Note: There has been some debate over the absence of indigenous Irish castle building. Irish castle specialist Tom McNeill has noted that it would appear very strange if the indigenous Irish lords had not adopted castle technology during their long struggle with the Anglo-Norman nobility, but there is no significant archaeological or historical evidence to show such construction.) It was not until 1185 that the first royal castle was built at Ardfinnan Castle and its sister Lismore Castle, with the first arrival of Henry II's son John, Lord of Ireland.

== 13th–14th centuries ==
=== Military developments ===
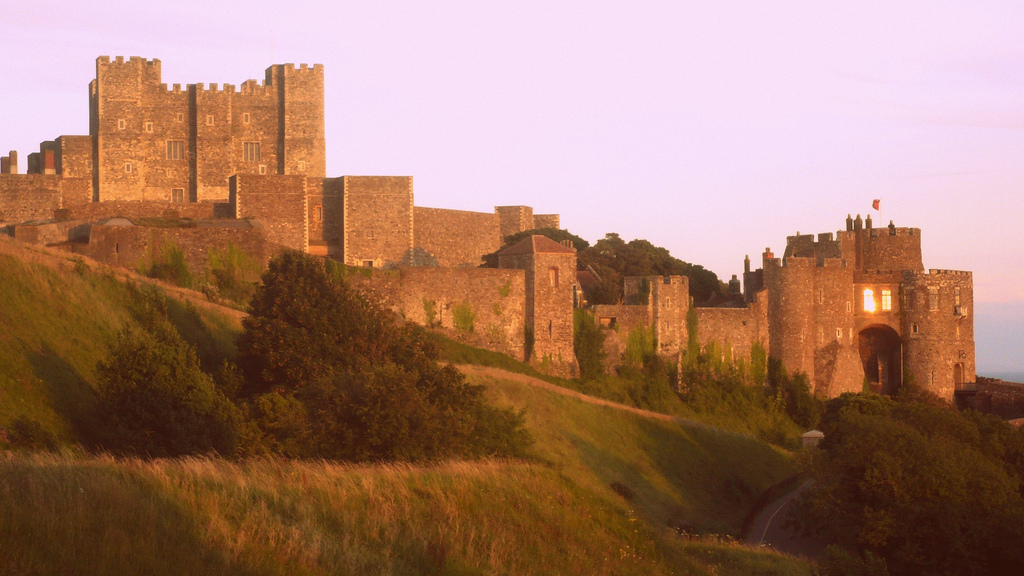
Dover Castle overlooking the English Channel in Kent, and built to a concentric design

Castle design in Britain continued to change towards the end of the 12th century. After Henry II mottes ceased to be built in most of England, although they continued to be erected in Wales and along the Marches. Square keeps remained common across much of England in contrast to the circular keeps increasingly prevailing in France; in the Marches, however, circular keep designs became more popular. Castles began to take on a more regular, enclosed shape, ideally quadrilateral or at least polygonal in design, especially in the more prosperous south. Flanking towers, initially square and latterly curved, were introduced along the walls and gatehouses began to grow in size and complexity, with portcullises being introduced for the first time. Castles such as Dover and the Tower of London were expanded in a concentric design in what Cathcart King has labelled the early development of "scientific fortification".

The developments spread to Anglo-Norman possessions in Ireland where this English style of castles dominated throughout the 13th century, although the deteriorating Irish economy of the 14th century brought this wave of building to an end. In Scotland Alexander II and Alexander III undertook a number of castle building projects in the modern style, although Alexander III's early death sparked conflict in Scotland and English intervention under Edward I in 1296. In the ensuing wars of Scottish Independence castle building in Scotland altered path, turning away from building larger, more conventional castles with curtain walls. The Scots instead adopted the policy of slighting, or deliberately destroying, castles captured in Scotland from the English to prevent their re-use in subsequent invasions – most of the new Scottish castles built by nobles were of the tower house design; the few larger castles built in Scotland were typically royal castles, built on the command of Scottish kings.

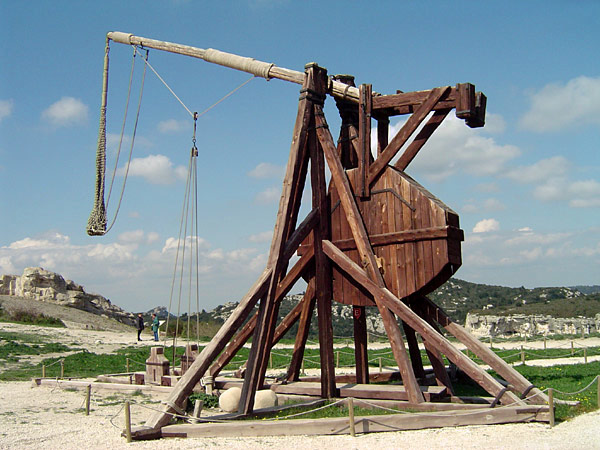
A reconstruction of a trebuchet

Some of these changes were driven by developments in military technology. Before 1190 mining was used rarely and the siege engines of the time were largely incapable of damaging the thicker castle walls. The introduction of the trebuchet began to change this situation; it was able to throw much heavier balls, with remarkable accuracy, and reconstructed devices have been shown to be able to knock holes in walls. Trebuchets were first recorded in England in 1217, and were probably used the year before as well. Richard I used them in his sieges during the Third Crusade and appears to have started to alter his castle designs to accommodate the new technology on his return to Europe. The trebuchet seems to have encouraged the shift towards round and polygonal towers and curved walls. In addition to having fewer or no dead zones, and being easier to defend against mining, these castle designs were also much less easy to attack with trebuchets as the curved surfaces could deflect some of the force of the shot.

Castles saw an increasing use of arrowslits by the 13th century, especially in England, almost certainly linked to the introduction of crossbows. These arrow slits were combined with firing positions from the tops of the towers, initially protected by wooden hoarding until stone machicolations were introduced in England in the late 13th century. The crossbow was an important military advance on the older short bow and was the favoured weapon by the time of Richard I; many crossbows and vast numbers of quarrels were needed to supply royal forces, in turn requiring larger scale iron production. In England, crossbows were primarily made at the Tower of London but St Briavels Castle, with the local Forest of Dean available to provide raw materials, became the national centre for quarrel manufacture. In Scotland, Edinburgh Castle became the centre for the production of bows, crossbows and siege engines for the king.

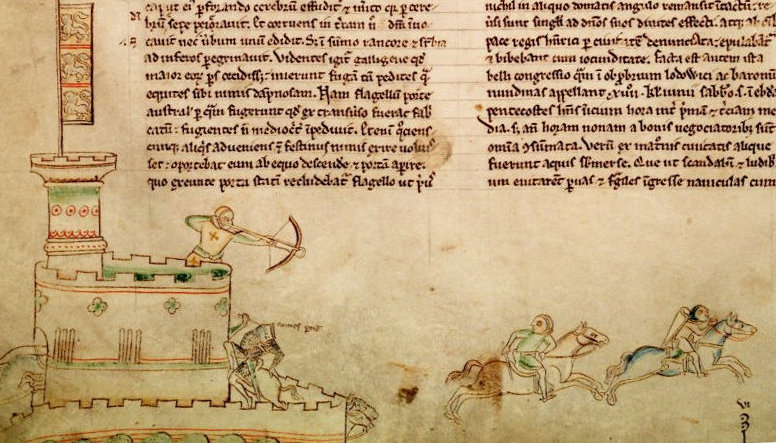
A contemporary sketch of Lincoln Castle in England at the start of the 13th century, defended by a crossbowman

One result of this was that English castle sieges grew in complexity and scale. During the First Barons' War from 1215 to 1217, the prominent sieges of Dover and Windsor Castle showed the ability of more modern designs to withstand attack; King John's successful siege of Rochester required an elaborate and sophisticated assault, reportedly costing around 60,000 marks, or £40,000. (Note: Both the mark and the pound sterling were accountancy terms in this period; a mark was worth around two-thirds of a pound.) The siege of Bedford Castle in 1224 required Henry III to bring siege engines, engineers, crossbow bolts, equipment and labourers from across all of England. The Siege of Kenilworth Castle in 1266, during the Second Barons' War, was larger and longer still. Extensive water defences withstood the attack of the future Edward I, despite the prince targeting the weaker parts of the castle walls, employing huge siege towers and attempting a night attack using barges brought from Chester. The costs of the siege exhausted the revenues of ten English counties. Sieges in Scotland were initially smaller in scale, with the first recorded such event being the 1230 siege of Rothesay Castle where the besieging Norwegians were able to break down the relatively weak stone walls with axes after only three days. When Edward I invaded Scotland he brought with him the siege capabilities which had evolved south of the border: Edinburgh Castle fell within three days, and Roxburgh, Jedburgh, Dunbar, Stirling, Lanark and Dumbarton castles surrendered to the king. Subsequent English sieges, such as the attacks on Bothwell and Stirling, again used considerable resources including giant siege engines and extensive teams of miners and masons.

=== Economy and society ===
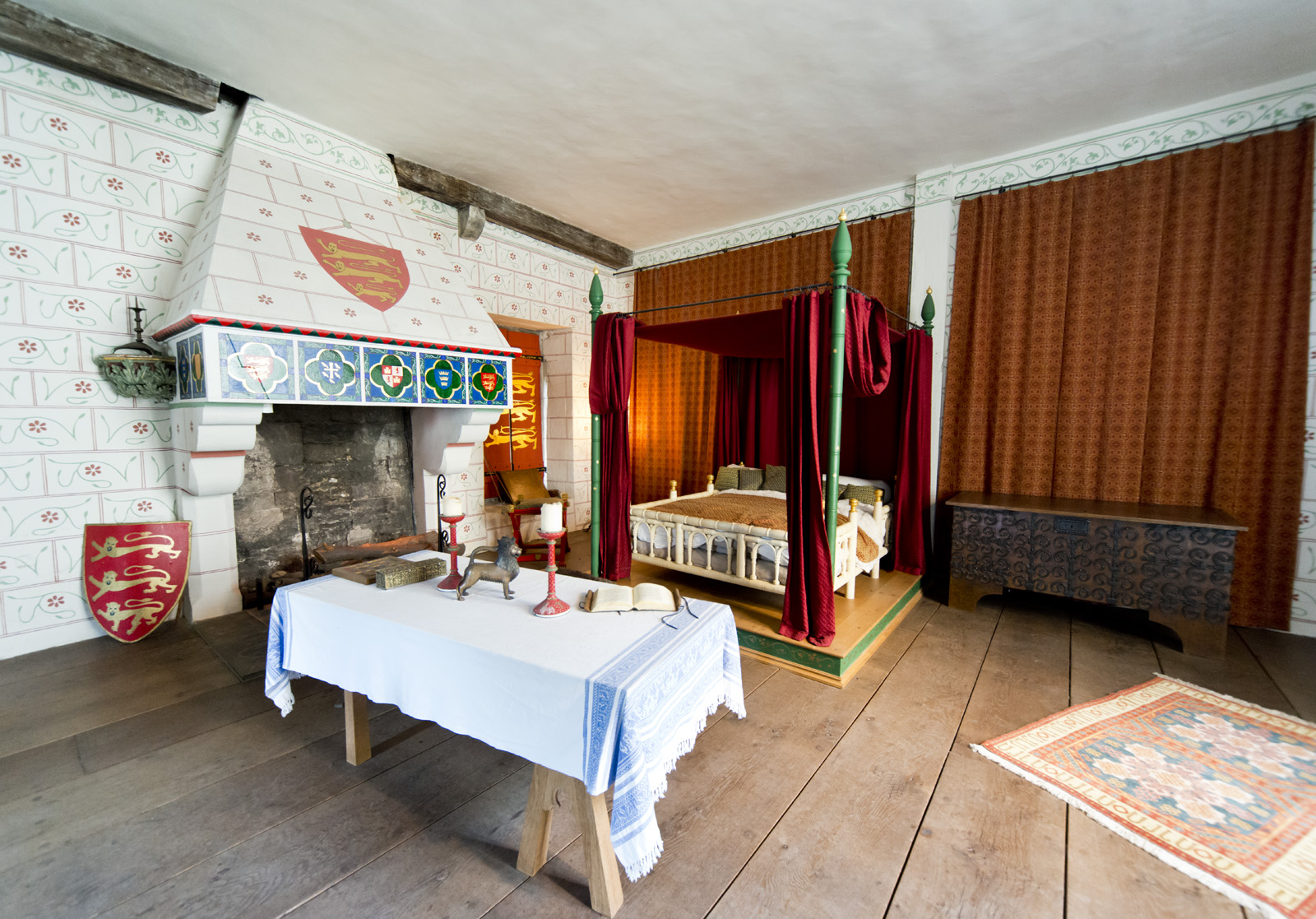
A reconstruction of Edward I's chambers at the Tower of London in England

A number of royal castles, from the 12th century onwards, formed an essential network of royal storehouses in the 13th century for a wide range of goods including food, drink, weapons, armour and raw materials. Castles such as Southampton, Winchester, Bristol and the Tower of London were used to import, store and distribute royal wines. The English royal castles also became used as jails – the Assize of Clarendon in 1166 insisted that royal sheriffs establish their own jails and, in the coming years, county jails were placed in all the shrieval royal castles. Conditions in these jails were poor and claims of poor treatment and starvation were common; Northampton Castle appears to have seen some of the worst abuses.

The development of the baronial castles in England were affected by the economic changes during the period. During the 13th and 14th centuries the average incomes of the English barons increased but wealth became concentrated in the hands of a smaller number of individuals, with a greater discrepancy in incomes. At the same time the costs of maintaining and staffing a modern castle were increasing. The result was that although there were around 400 castles in England in 1216, the number of castles continued to diminish over the coming years; even the wealthier barons were inclined to let some castles slide into disuse and to focus their resources on the remaining stock. The castle-guard system faded into abeyance in England, being replaced by financial rents, although it continued in the Welsh Marches well into the 13th century and saw some limited use during Edward I's occupation of Scotland in the early 14th century.

A reconstruction of Holt Castle in Wales c. 1495. The castle was built in the late 13th century by John de Warenne, 6th Earl of Surrey.

The remaining English castles became increasingly comfortable. Their interiors were often painted and decorated with tapestries, which would be transported from castle to castle as nobles travelled around the country. There were an increasing number of garderobes built inside castles, while in the wealthier castles the floors could be tiled and the windows furnished with Sussex Weald glass, allowing the introduction of window seats for reading. Food could be transported to castles across relatively long distances; fish was brought to Okehampton Castle from the sea some 25 miles (40 km) away, for example. Venison remained the most heavily consumed food in most castles, particularly those surrounded by extensive parks or forests such as Barnard Castle, while prime cuts of venison were imported to those castles that lacked hunting grounds, such as Launceston.

By the late 13th century some castles were built within carefully "designed landscapes", sometimes drawing a distinction between an inner core of a herber, a small enclosed garden complete with orchards and small ponds, and an outer region with larger ponds and high status buildings such as "religious buildings, rabbit warrens, mills and settlements", potentially set within a park. A gloriette, or a suite of small rooms, might be built within the castle to allow the result to be properly appreciated, or a viewing point constructed outside. At Leeds Castle the redesigned castle of the 1280s was placed within a large water garden, while at Ravensworth at the end of the 14th century an artificial lake was enclosed by a park to produce an aesthetically and symbolically pleasing entrance to the fortification. The wider parklands and forests were increasingly managed and the proportion of the smaller fallow deer consumed by castle inhabitants in England increased as a result.

=== Welsh castles ===
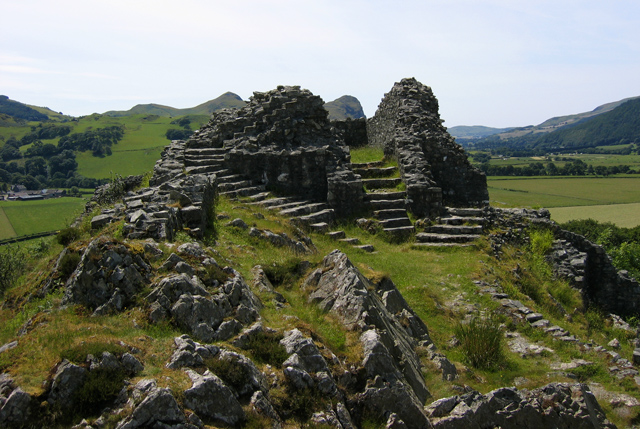
Llywelyn the Great's Castell y Bere in Gwynedd in Wales

During the 13th century the native Welsh princes built a number of stone castles. The size of these varied considerably from smaller fortifications, such as Dinas Emrys in Snowdonia, to more substantial castles like Dinefwr and the largest, Castell y Bere. Native Welsh castles typically maximised the defensive benefits of high, mountainous sites, often being built in an irregular shape to fit a rocky peak. Most had deep ditches cut out of the rock to protect the main castle. The Welsh castles were usually built with a relatively short keep, used as living accommodation for princes and nobility, and with distinctive 'apsidal' D-shaped towers along the walls. In comparison to Norman castles the gatehouses were much weaker in design, with almost no use of portcullises or spiral staircases, and the stonework of the outer walls was also generally inferior to Norman built castles. The later native Welsh castles, built in the 1260s, more closely resemble Norman designs; including round towers and, in the case of Criccieth and Dinas Brân, twin-towered gatehouse defences.

=== Edward I's castles in Wales ===
In 1277 Edward I launched a final invasion of the remaining native Welsh strongholds in North Wales, intending to establish his rule over the region on a permanent basis. As part of this occupation he instructed his leading nobles to construct eight new castles across the region; Aberystwyth and Builth in mid-Wales and Beaumaris, Conwy, Caernarfon, Flint, Harlech and Rhuddlan Castle in North Wales. Historian R. Allen Brown has described these as "amongst the finest achievements of medieval military architecture [in England and Wales]". The castles varied in design but were typically characterised by powerful mural towers along the castle walls, with multiple, over-lapping firing points and large and extremely well defended barbicans. The castles were intended to be used by the king when in the region and included extensive high-status accommodation. Edward also established various new English towns, and in several cases the new castles were designed to be used alongside the fortified town walls as part of an integrated defence. Historian Richard Morris has suggested that "the impression is firmly given of an elite group of men-of-war, long-standing comrades in arms of the king, indulging in an orgy of military architectural expression on an almost unlimited budget".

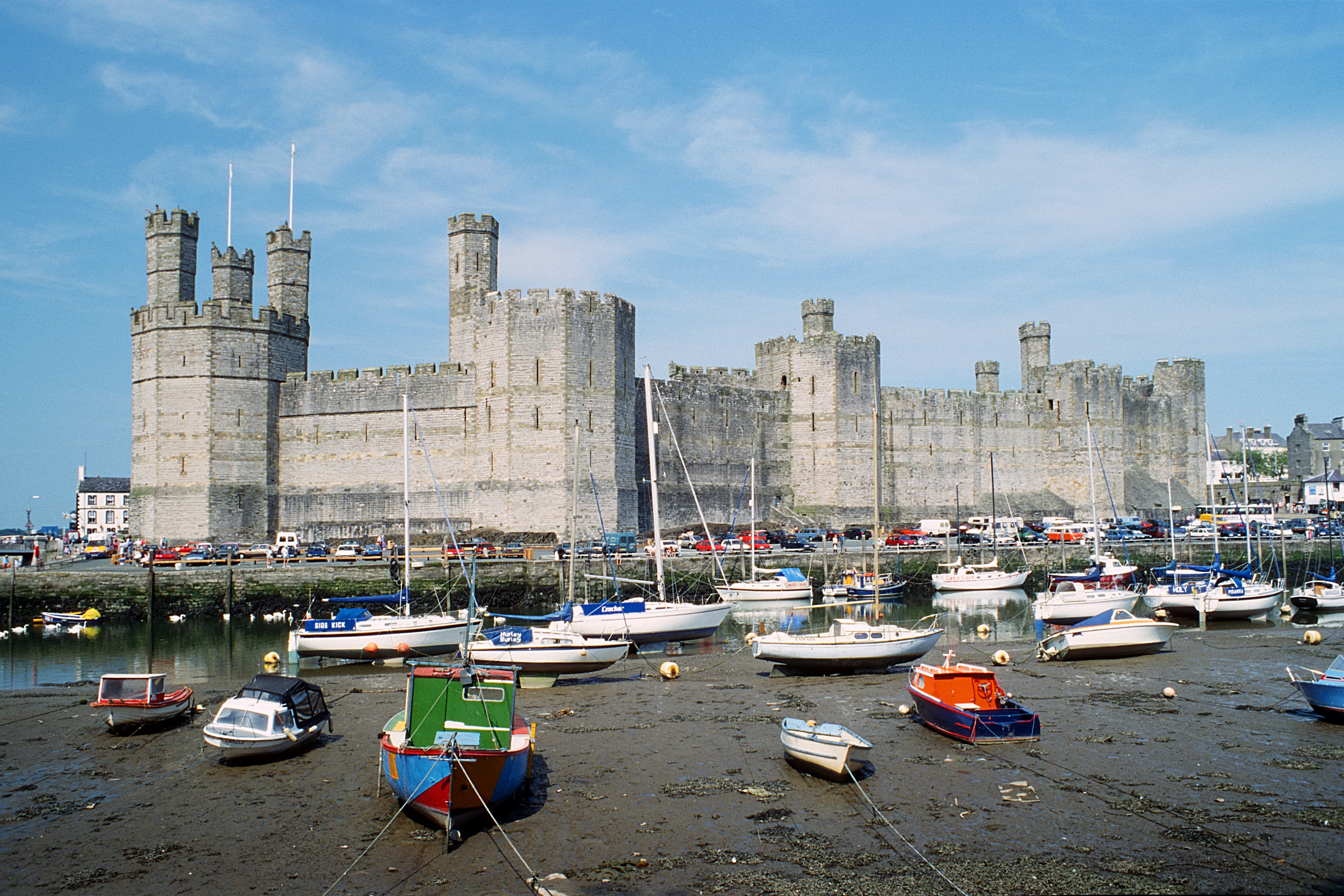
Edward I's Caernarfon Castle in Wales

James of Saint George, a famous architect and engineer from Savoy, was probably responsible for the bulk of the construction work across the region. The castles were extremely costly to build and required labourers, masons, carpenters, diggers, and building resources to be gathered by local sheriffs from across England, mustered at Chester and Bristol, before being sent on to North Wales in the spring, returning home each winter. The number of workers involved placed a significant drain on the country's national labour force. The total financial cost cannot be calculated with certainty, but estimates suggest that Edward's castle building programme cost at least £80,000 – four times the total royal expenditure on castles between 1154 and 1189.

The Edwardian castles also made strong symbolic statements about the nature of the new occupation. For example, Caernarvon was decorated with carved eagles, equipped with polygonal towers and expensive banded masonry, all designed to imitate the Theodosian Walls of Constantinople, then the idealised image of imperial power. The actual site of the castle may also have been important as it was positioned close to the former Roman fort of Segontium. The elaborate gatehouse, with an excessive five sets of doors and six portcullises, also appears to have been designed to impress visitors and to invoke an image of an Arthurian castle, then believed to have been Byzantine in character.

=== Palace-fortresses ===
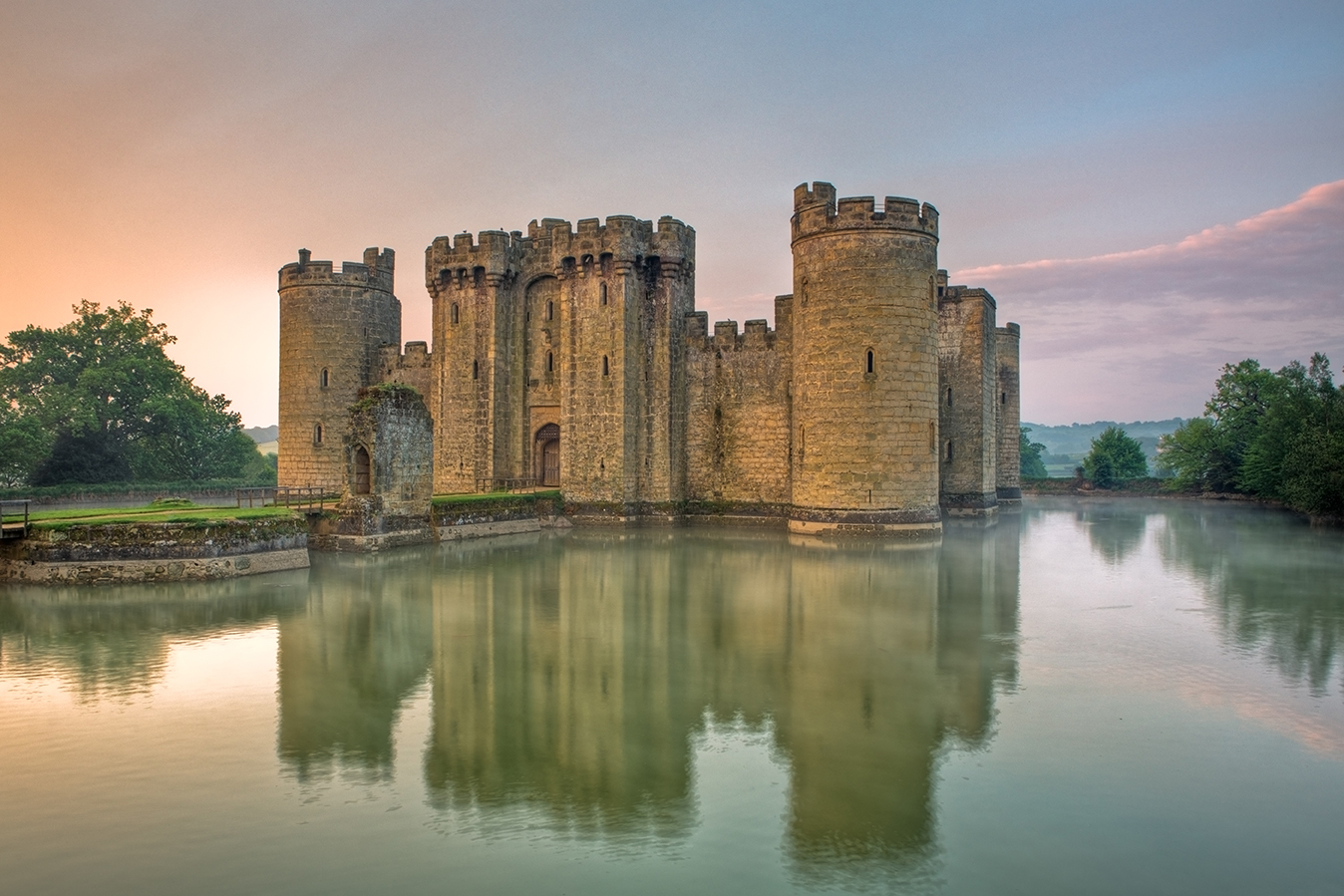
Bodiam Castle in southern England, a moated castle designed as a luxurious private home

In the middle of the 13th century Henry III began to redesign his favourite castles, including Winchester and Windsor, building larger halls, grander chapels, installing glass windows and decorating the palaces with painted walls and furniture. This marked the beginning of a trend towards the development of grand castles designed for elaborate, elite living. Life in earlier keeps had been focused around a single great hall, with privacy for the owner's family provided by using an upper floor for their own living accommodation. By the 14th century nobles were travelling less, bringing much larger households with them when they did travel and entertaining visitors with equally large retinues. Castles such as Goodrich were redesigned in the 1320s to provide greater residential privacy and comfort for the ruling family, while retaining strong defensive features and a capacity to hold over 130 residents at the castle. The design influenced subsequent conversions at Berkeley and by the time that Bolton Castle was being built, in the 1380s, it was designed to hold up to eight different noble households, each with their own facilities. Royal castles such as Beaumaris, although designed with defence in mind, were designed to hold up to eleven different households at any one time.

Kings and the most wealthy lords could afford to redesign castles to produce palace-fortresses. Edward III spent £51,000 on renovating Windsor Castle; this was over one and a half times Edward's typical annual income. In the words of Steven Brindle the result was a "great and apparently architecturally unified palace... uniform in all sorts of ways, as to roof line, window heights, cornice line, floor and ceiling heights", echoing older designs but without any real defensive value. The wealthy John of Gaunt redesigned the heart of Kenilworth Castle, like Windsor the work emphasised a unifying, rectangular design and the separation of ground floor service areas from the upper stories and a contrast of austere exteriors with lavish interiors, especially on the 1st floor of the inner bailey buildings. By the end of the 14th century a distinctive English perpendicular style had emerged.

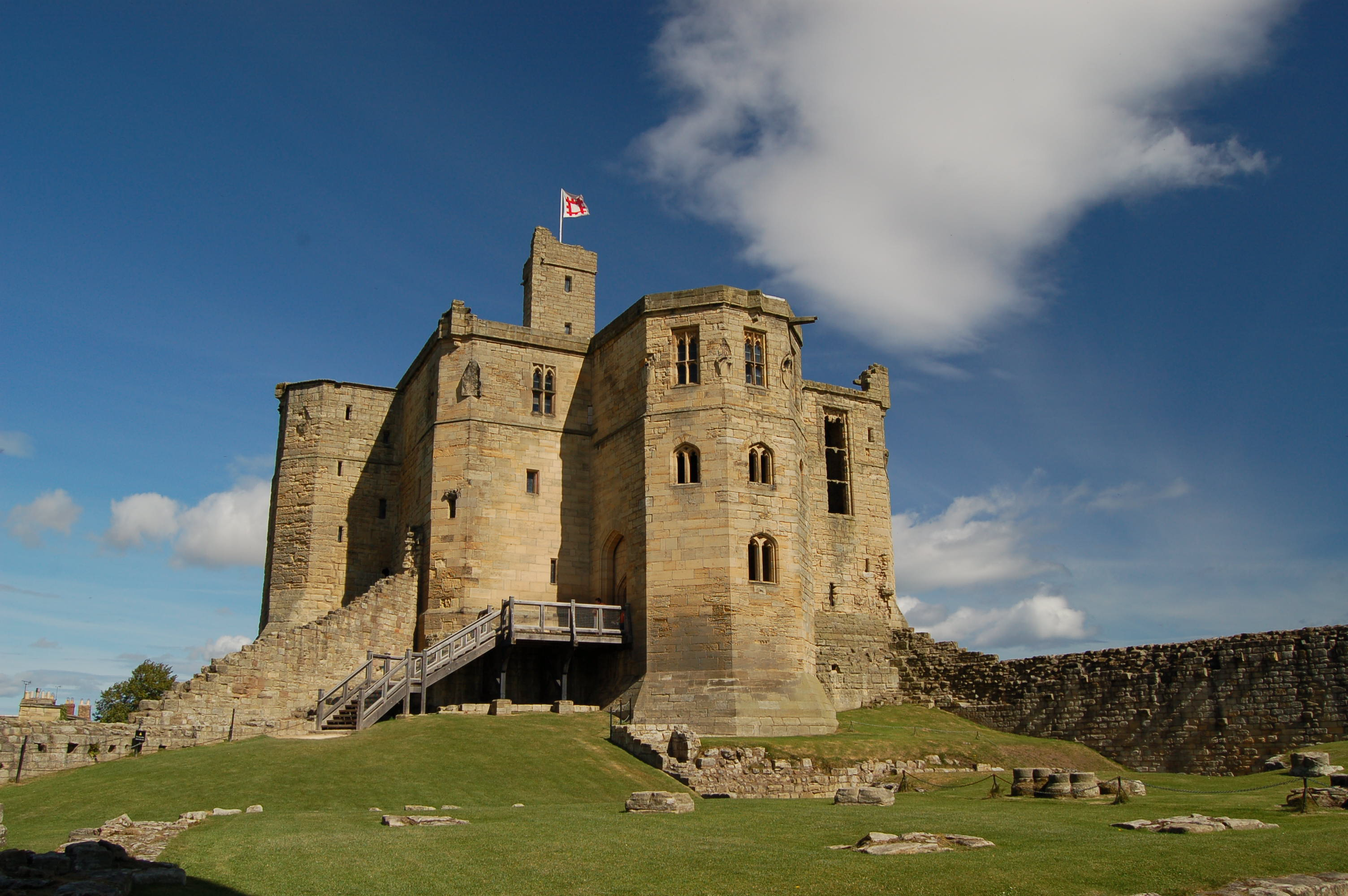
The late 14th-century tower keep of Warkworth Castle in northern England, flying the flag of English Heritage

In the south of England private castles were being built by newly emerging, wealthy families; like the work at Windsor, these castles drew on the architectural themes of earlier martial designs, but were not intended to form a serious defence against attack. These new castles were heavily influenced by French designs, involving a rectangular or semi-rectangular castle with corner towers, gatehouses and moat; the walls effectively enclosing a comfortable courtyard plan not dissimilar to that of an unfortified manor. Bodiam Castle built in the 1380s possessed a moat, towers and gunports but, rather than being a genuine military fortification, the castle was primarily intended to be admired by visitors and used as a luxurious dwelling – the chivalric architecture implicitly invoking comparisons with Edward I's great castle at Beaumaris.

In the north of England improvements in the security of the Scottish border, and the rise of major noble families such as the Percies and the Nevilles, encouraged a surge in castle building at the end of the 14th century. Palace-fortresses such as Raby, Bolton and Warkworth Castle took the quadrangular castle styles of the south and combined them with exceptionally large key towers or keeps to form a distinctive northern style. Built by major noble houses these castles were typically even more opulent than those built by the nouveau riche of the south. They marked what historian Anthony Emery has described as a "second peak of castle building in England and Wales", after the Edwardian designs at the end of the 14th century.

=== Introduction of gunpowder ===
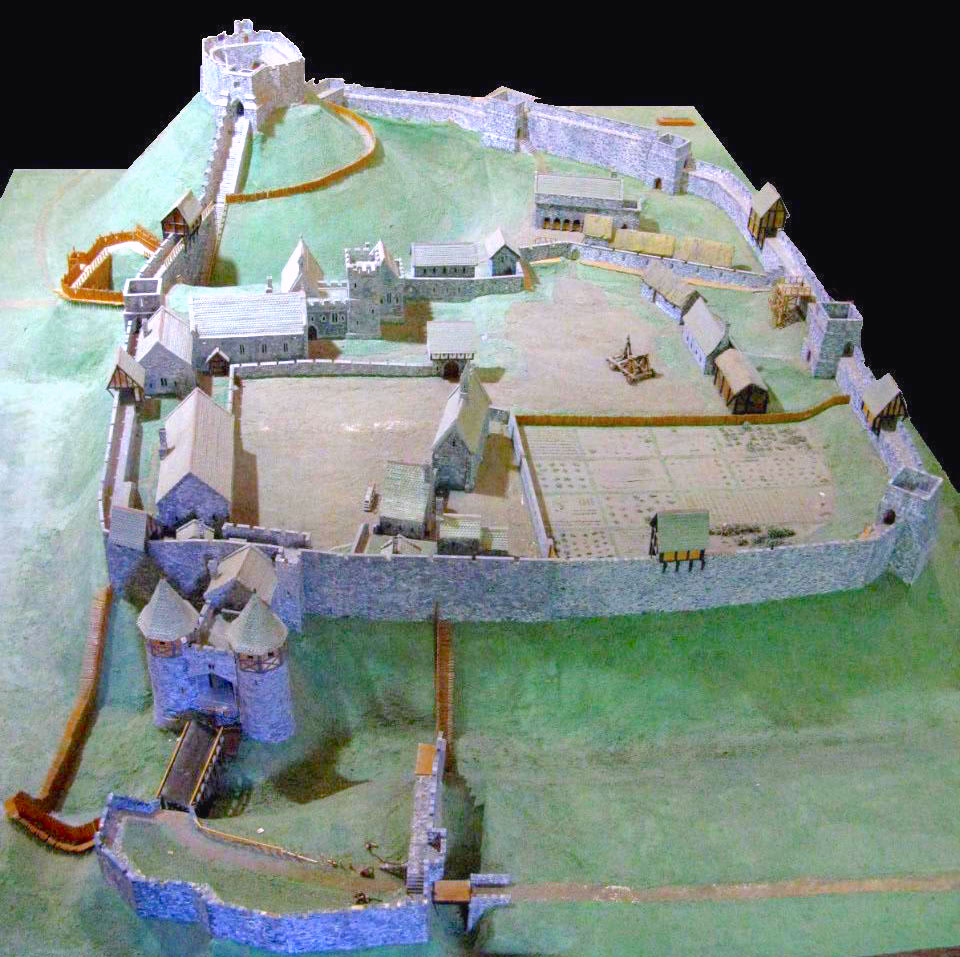
Carisbrooke Castle on the Isle of Wight in England, shortly before the addition of cannons to its defences in the 14th century. It began with the motte at the top.

Early gunpowder weapons were introduced to England from the 1320s onwards and began to appear in Scotland by the 1330s. By the 1340s the English Crown was regularly spending money on them and the new technology began to be installed in English castles by the 1360s and 1370s, and in Scottish castles by the 1380s. Cannons were made in various sizes, from smaller hand cannons to larger guns firing stone balls of up to 7.6 inches (19 cm). Medium-sized weapons weighing around 20 kg each were more useful for the defence of castles, although Richard II eventually established 600 pound (272 kilo) guns at the Tower of London and the 15,366 pound (6,970 kilo) heavy Mons Meg bombard was installed at Edinburgh Castle.

Early cannons had only a limited range and were unreliable; in addition early stone cannonballs were relatively ineffective when fired at stone castle walls. As a result, early cannon proved most useful for defence, particularly against infantry assaults or to fire at the crews of enemy trebuchets. Indeed, early cannons could be quite dangerous to their own soldiers; James II of Scotland was killed besieging Roxburgh Castle in 1460 when one of his cannons, called "Lion", exploded next to him. The expense of early cannons meant that they were primarily a weapon deployed by royalty rather than the nobility.

Cannons in English castles were initially deployed along the south coast where the Channel ports, essential for English trade and military operations in Europe, were increasingly threatened by French raids. Carisbrooke, Corfe, Dover, Portchester, Saltwood and Southampton Castle received cannon during the late 14th century, small circular "keyhole" gunports being built in the walls to accommodate the new weapons. Carisbrooke Castle was subject to an unsuccessful French siege in 1377, the Crown reacting by equipping the castle with cannon and a mill for producing gunpowder in 1379. Some further English castles along the Welsh borders and Scotland were similarly equipped, with the Tower of London and Pontefract Castle acting as supply depots for the new weapons. In Scotland the first cannon for a castle appears to have been bought for Edinburgh in 1384, which also became an arsenal for the new devices.

== 15th–16th centuries ==
=== Decline of English castles ===
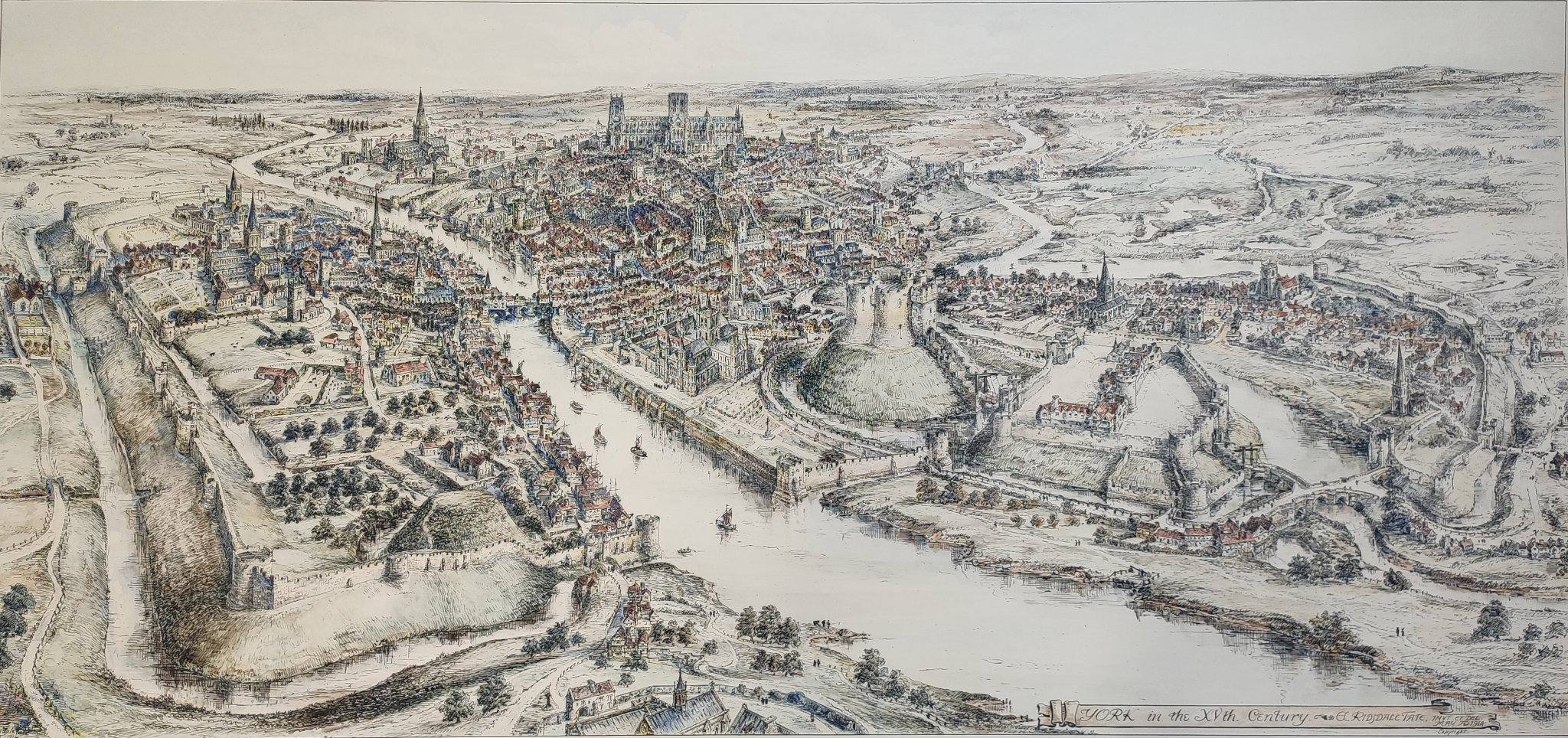
A reconstruction of the English city of York in the 15th century, showing York Castle (r) and the Old Baile (l), both mottes

By the 15th century very few castles were well maintained by their owners. Many royal castles were receiving insufficient investment to allow them to be maintained – roofs leaked, stone work crumbled, lead or wood was stolen. The Crown was increasingly selective about which royal castles it maintained, with others left to decay. By the 15th century only Windsor, Leeds, Rockingham and Moor End were kept up as comfortable accommodation; Nottingham and York formed the backbone for royal authority in the north, and Chester, Gloucester and Bristol forming the equivalents in the west. Even major fortifications such as the castles of North Wales and the border castles of Carlisle, Bamburgh and Newcastle upon Tyne saw funding and maintenance reduced. Many royal castles continued to have a role as the county jail, with the gatehouse frequently being used as the principal facility.

The ranks of the baronage continued to reduce in the 15th century, producing a smaller elite of wealthier lords but reducing the comparative wealth of the majority. and many baronial castles fell into similar decline. John Leland's 16th-century accounts of English castles are replete with descriptions of castles being "sore decayed", their defences "in ruine" or, where the walls might still be in good repair, the "logginges within" were "decayed". English castles did not play a decisive role during the Wars of the Roses, fought between 1455 and 1485, which were primarily in the form of pitched battles between the rival factions of the Lancastrians and the Yorkists.

=== Renaissance palaces ===
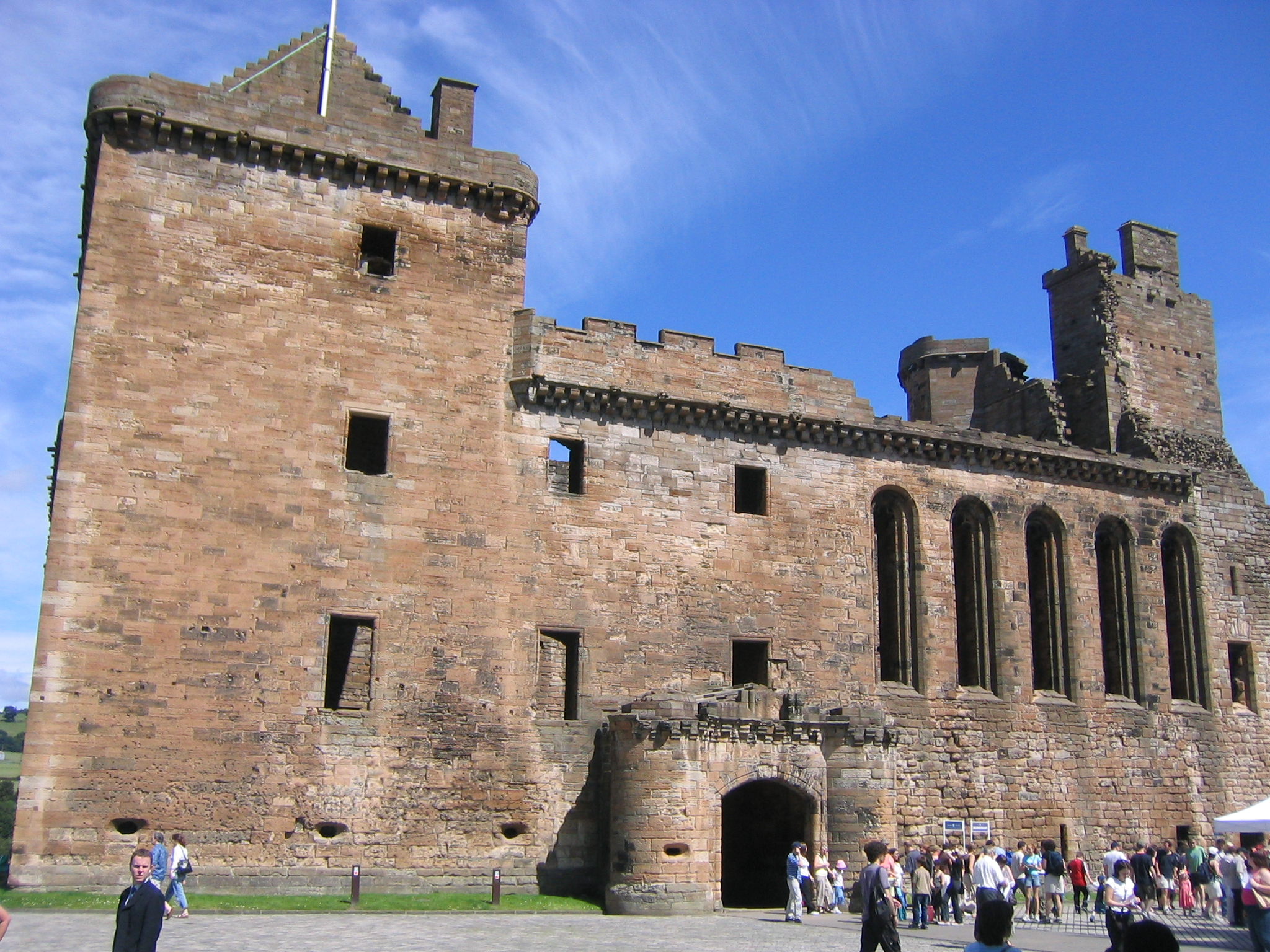
Linlithgow in Scotland, rebuilt as a royal palace in the 15th century

The 15th and 16th centuries saw a small number of British castles develop into still grander structures, often drawing on the Renaissance views on architecture that were increasing in popularity on the continent. Tower keeps, large solid keeps used for private accommodation, probably inspired by those in France had started to appear in the 14th century at Dudley and Warkworth. In the 15th century the fashion spread with the creation of very expensive, French-influenced palatial castles featuring complex tower keeps at Wardour, Tattershall and Raglan Castle. In central and eastern England castles began to be built in brick, with Caister, Kirby Muxloe and Tattershall forming examples of this new style. North of the border the construction of Holyrood Great Tower between 1528 and 1532 picked up on this English tradition, but incorporated additional French influences to produce a highly secure but comfortable castle, guarded by a gun park.

Royal builders in Scotland led the way in adopting further European Renaissance styles in castle design. James IV and James V used exceptional one-off revenues, such as the forfeiture of key lands, to establish their power across their kingdom in various ways including constructing grander castles such as Linlithgow, almost invariably by extending and modifying existing fortifications. These Scottish castle palaces drew on Italian Renaissance designs, in particular the fashionable design of a quadrangular court with stair-turrets on each corner, using harling to giving them a clean, Italian appearance. Later the castles drew on Renaissance designs in France, such as the work at Falkland and Stirling Castle. The shift in architectural focus reflected changing political alliances, as James V had formed a close alliance with France during his reign. In the words of architectural historian John Dunbar the results were the "earliest examples of coherent Renaissance design in Britain".

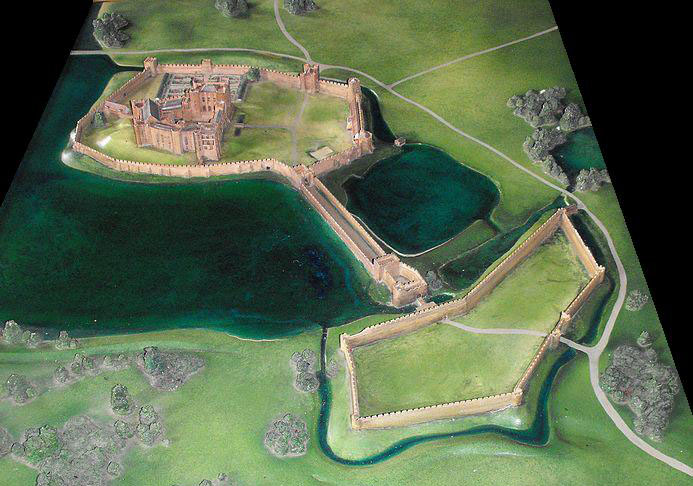
A reconstruction of the palatial Kenilworth Castle in England around 1575

These changes also included shifts in social and cultural beliefs. The period saw the disintegration of the older feudal order, the destruction of the monasteries and widespread economic changes, altering the links between castles and the surrounding estates. Within castles, the Renaissance saw the introduction of the idea of public and private spaces, placing new value on castles having private spaces for the lord or his guests away from public view. Although the elite in Britain and Ireland continued to maintain and build castles in the style of the late medieval period there was a growing understanding through the Renaissance, absent in the 14th century, that domestic castles were fundamentally different from the military fortifications being built to deal with the spread of gunpowder artillery. Castles continued to be built and reworked in what cultural historian Matthew Johnson has described as a "conscious attempt to invoke values seen as being under threat". The results, as at Kenilworth Castle for example, could include huge castles deliberately redesigned to appear old and sporting chivalric features, but complete with private chambers, Italian loggias and modern luxury accommodation.

Although the size of noble households shrank slightly during the 16th century, the number of guests at the largest castle events continued to grow. 2,000 came to a feast at Cawood Castle in 1466, while the Duke of Buckingham routinely entertained up to 519 people at Thornbury Castle at the start of the 16th century. When Elizabeth I visited Kenilworth in 1575 she brought an entourage of 31 barons and 400 staff for a visit that lasted an exceptional 19 days; Leicester, the castle's owner, entertained the Queen and much of the neighbouring region with pageants, fireworks, bear baiting, mystery plays, hunting and lavish banquets. With this scale of living and entertainment the need to find more space in older castles became a major issue in both England and Scotland.

=== Tower houses ===
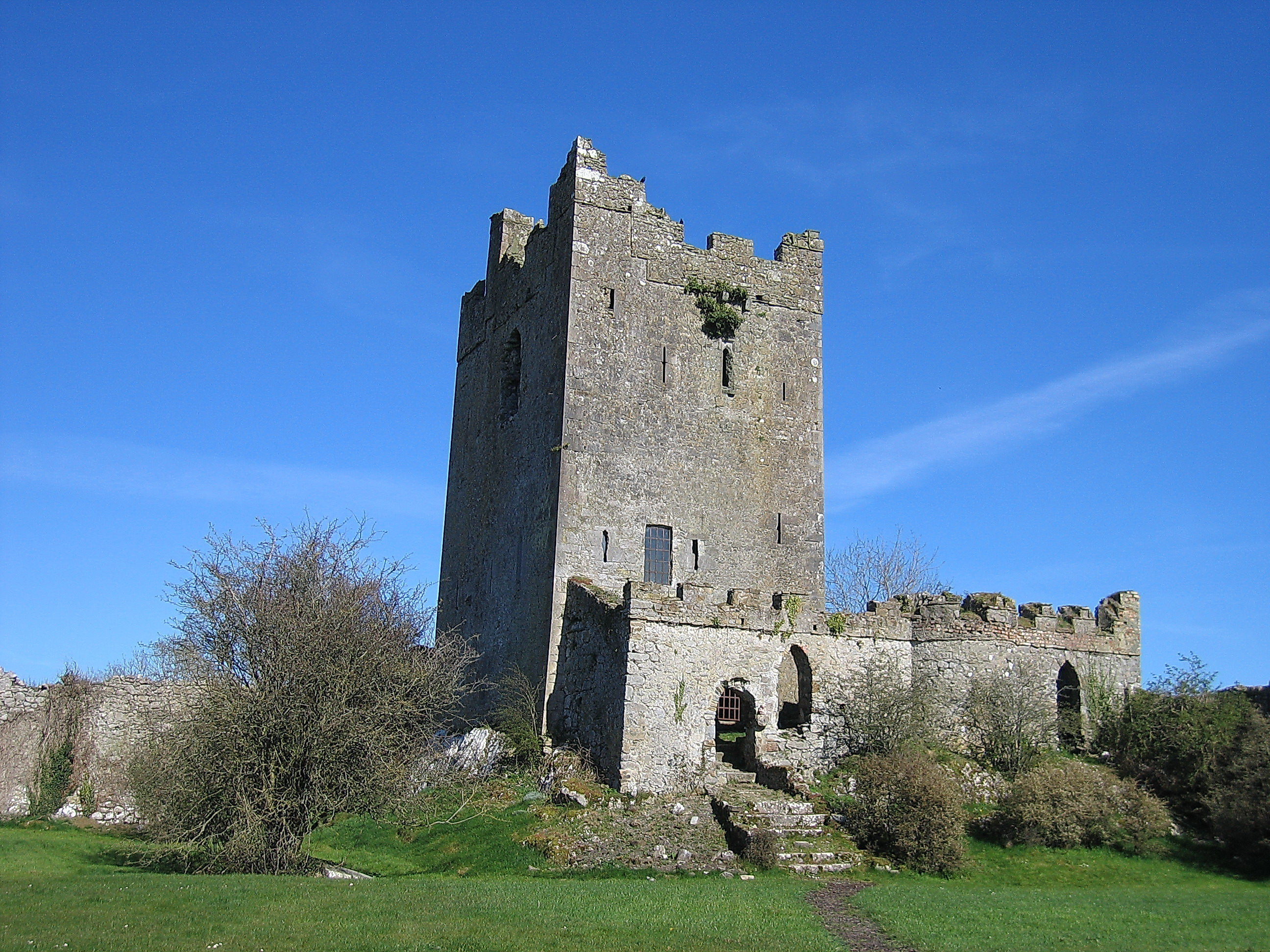
Clonony Castle in Ireland, a 16th-century tower house

Tower houses were a common feature of British and Irish castle building in the late medieval period: over 3,000 were constructed in Ireland, around 800 in Scotland and over 250 in England. A tower house would typically be a tall, square, stone-built, crenelated building; Scottish and Ulster tower houses were often also surrounded by a barmkyn or bawn, a walled courtyard designed to hold valuable animals securely, but not necessarily intended for serious defence. Many of the gateways in these buildings were guarded with yetts, grill-like doors made out of metal bars. Smaller versions of tower houses in northern England and southern Scotland were known as Peel towers, or pele houses, and were built along both sides of the border regions. In Scotland a number were built in Scottish towns. It was originally argued that Irish tower houses were based on the Scottish design, but the pattern of development of such castles in Ireland does not support this hypothesis.

The defences of tower houses were primarily aimed to provide protection against smaller raiding parties and were not intended to put up significant opposition to an organised military assault, leading historian Stuart Reid to characterise them as "defensible rather than defensive". Gunports for heavier guns were built into some Scottish tower houses by the 16th century but it was more common to use lighter gunpowder weapons, such as muskets, to defend Scottish tower houses. Unlike Scotland, Irish tower houses were only defended with relatively light handguns and frequently reused older arrow-loops, rather than more modern designs, to save money.

Analysis of the construction of tower houses has focused on two key driving forces. The first is that the construction of these castles appears to have been linked to periods of instability and insecurity in the areas concerned. In Scotland James IV's forfeiture of the Lordship of the Isles in 1494 led to an immediate burst of castle building across the region and, over the longer term, an increased degree of clan warfare, while the subsequent wars with England in the 1540s added to the level of insecurity over the rest of the century. Irish tower houses were built from the end of the 14th century onward as the countryside disintegrated into the unstable control of a large number of small lordships and Henry VI promoted their construction with financial rewards in a bid to improve security. English tower houses were built along the frontier with Scotland in a dangerous and insecure period. Secondly, and paradoxically, appears to have been the periods of relative prosperity. Contemporary historian William Camden observed of the northern English and the Scots, "there is not a man amongst them of a better sort that hath not his little tower or pile", and many tower houses seem to have been built as much as status symbols as defensive structures. Along the English-Scottish borders the construction pattern follows the relative prosperity of the different side: the English lords built tower houses primarily in the early 15th century, when northern England was particularly prosperous, while their Scottish equivalents built them in late 15th and early 16th centuries, boom periods in the economy of Scotland. In Ireland the growth of tower houses during the 15th century mirrors the rise of cattle herding and the resulting wealth that this brought to many of the lesser lords in Ireland.

=== Further development of gunpowder artillery ===
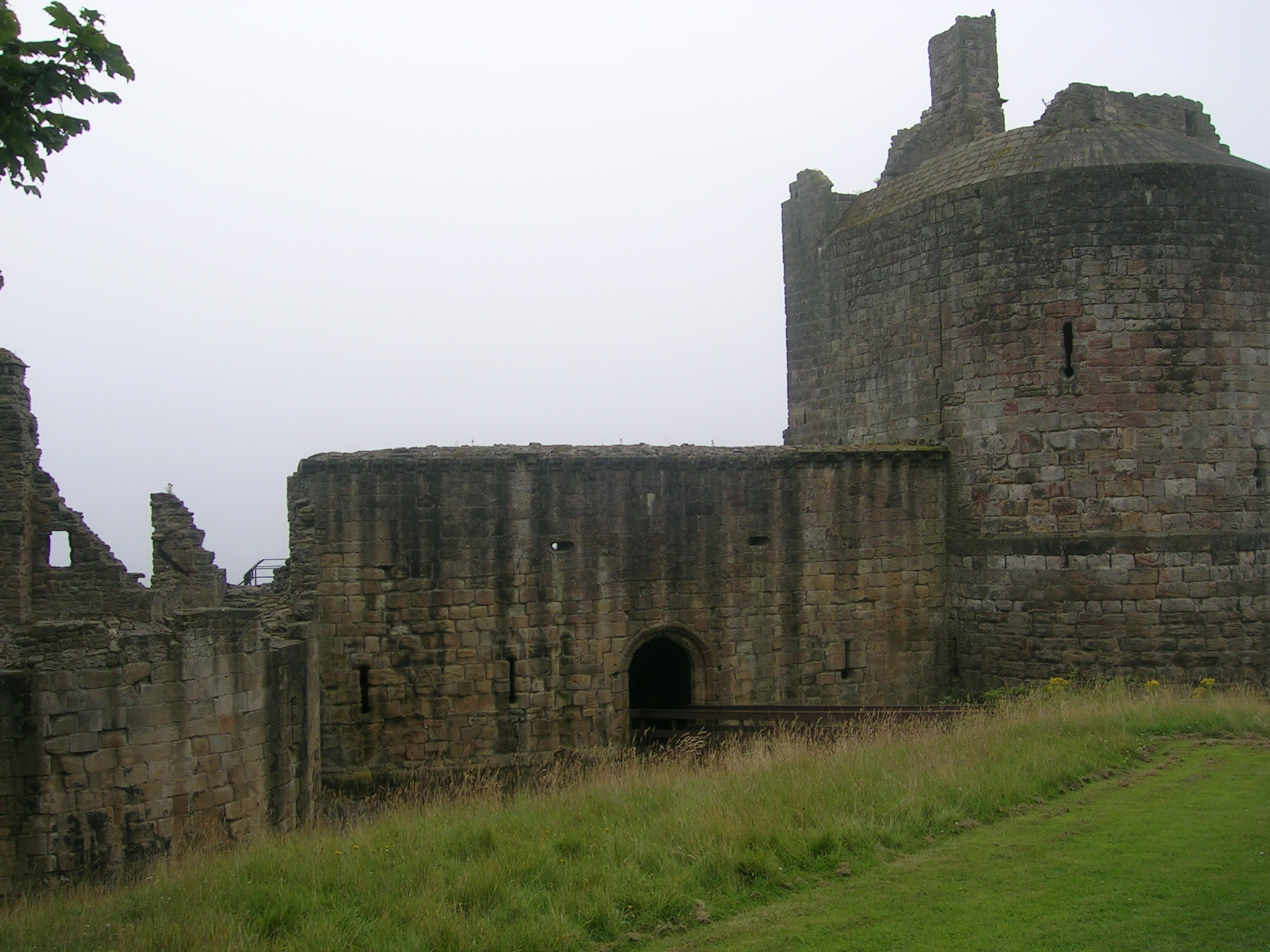
Ravenscraig Castle in Scotland, showing its curved, low-profile fortifications designed to resist cannon fire

Cannons continued to be improved during the 15th and 16th centuries. Castle loopholes were adapted to allow cannons and other firearms to be used in a defensive role, but offensively gunpowder weapons still remained relatively unreliable. England had lagged behind Europe in adapting to this new form of warfare; Dartmouth and Kingswear Castles, built in the 1490s to defend the River Dart, and Bayard's Cover, designed in 1510 to defend Dartmouth harbour itself, were amongst the few English castles designed in the continental style during the period, and even these lagged behind the cutting edge of European design. Scottish castles were more advanced in this regard, partially as a result of the stronger French architectural influences. Ravenscraig Castle in Scotland, for example, was an early attempt in the 1460s to deploy a combination of "letter box" gun-ports and low-curved stone towers for artillery weapons. These letter box gun-ports, common in mainland Europe, rapidly spread across Scotland but were rarely used in England during the 15th century. Scotland also led the way in adopting the new caponier design for castle ditches, as constructed at Craignethan Castle.

Henry VIII became concerned with the threat of French invasion during 1539 and was familiar with the more modern continental designs. He responded to the threat by building a famous sequence of forts, called the Device Forts or Henrician Castles, along the south coast of England specifically designed to be equipped with, and to defend against, gunpowder artillery. These forts still lacked some of the more modern continental features, such as angled bastions. Each fort had a slightly different design, but as a group they shared common features, with the fortification formed around a number of compact lobes, often in a quatrefoil or trefoil shape, designed to give the guns a 360-degree angle of fire. The forts were usually tiered to allow the guns to fire over one another and had features such as vents to disperse the gunpowder smoke. It is probable that many of the forts were also originally protected by earth bulwarks, although these have not survived. The resulting forts have been described by historian Christopher Duffy as having "an air at once sturdy and festive, rather like a squashed wedding cake".

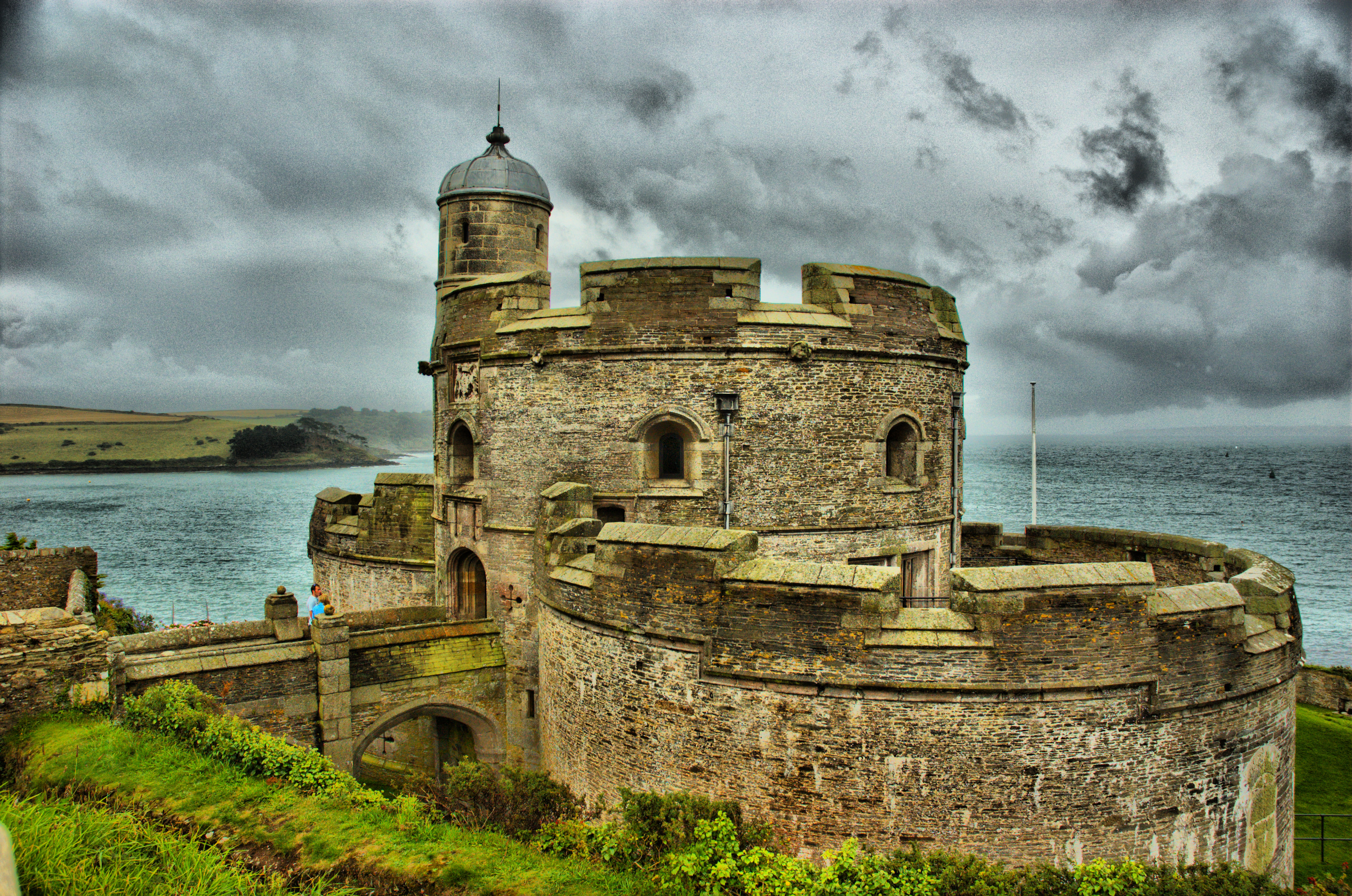
St Mawes Castle in Cornwall, England, one of Henry VIII's Device Forts

These coastal defences marked a shift away from castles, which were both military fortifications and domestic buildings, towards forts, which were garrisoned but not domestic; often the 1540s are chosen as a transition date for the study of castles as a consequence. The subsequent years also marked almost the end of indigenous English fortification design – by the 1580s English castle improvements were almost entirely dominated by imported European experts. The superiority of Scottish castle design also diminished; the Half Moon battery built at Edinburgh Castle in 1574, for example, was already badly dated in continental terms by the time it was built. The limited number of modern fortifications built in Ireland, such as those with the first gunports retrofitted to Carrickfergus Castle in the 1560s and at Corkbeg in Cork Harbour and built in the 1570s in fear of an invasion, were equally unexceptional by European standards.

Nonetheless, improved gunpowder artillery played a part in the reconquest of Ireland in the 1530s, where the successful English siege of Maynooth Castle in 1530 demonstrated the power of the new siege guns. There were still relatively few guns in Ireland however and, during the Nine Years' War at the end of the century, the Irish were proved relatively unskilled in siege warfare with artillery used mainly by the English. In both Ireland and Scotland the challenge was how to transport artillery pieces to castle sieges; the poor state of Scottish roads required expensive trains of pack horses, which only the king could afford, and in Ireland the river network had to be frequently used to transport the weapons inland. In these circumstances older castles could frequently remain viable defensive features, although the siege of Cahir Castle in 1599 and the attack on Dunyvaig Castle on Islay in 1614 proved that if artillery could be brought to bear, previously impregnable castle walls might fall relatively quickly.

== 17th century ==
=== Wars of the Three Kingdoms ===
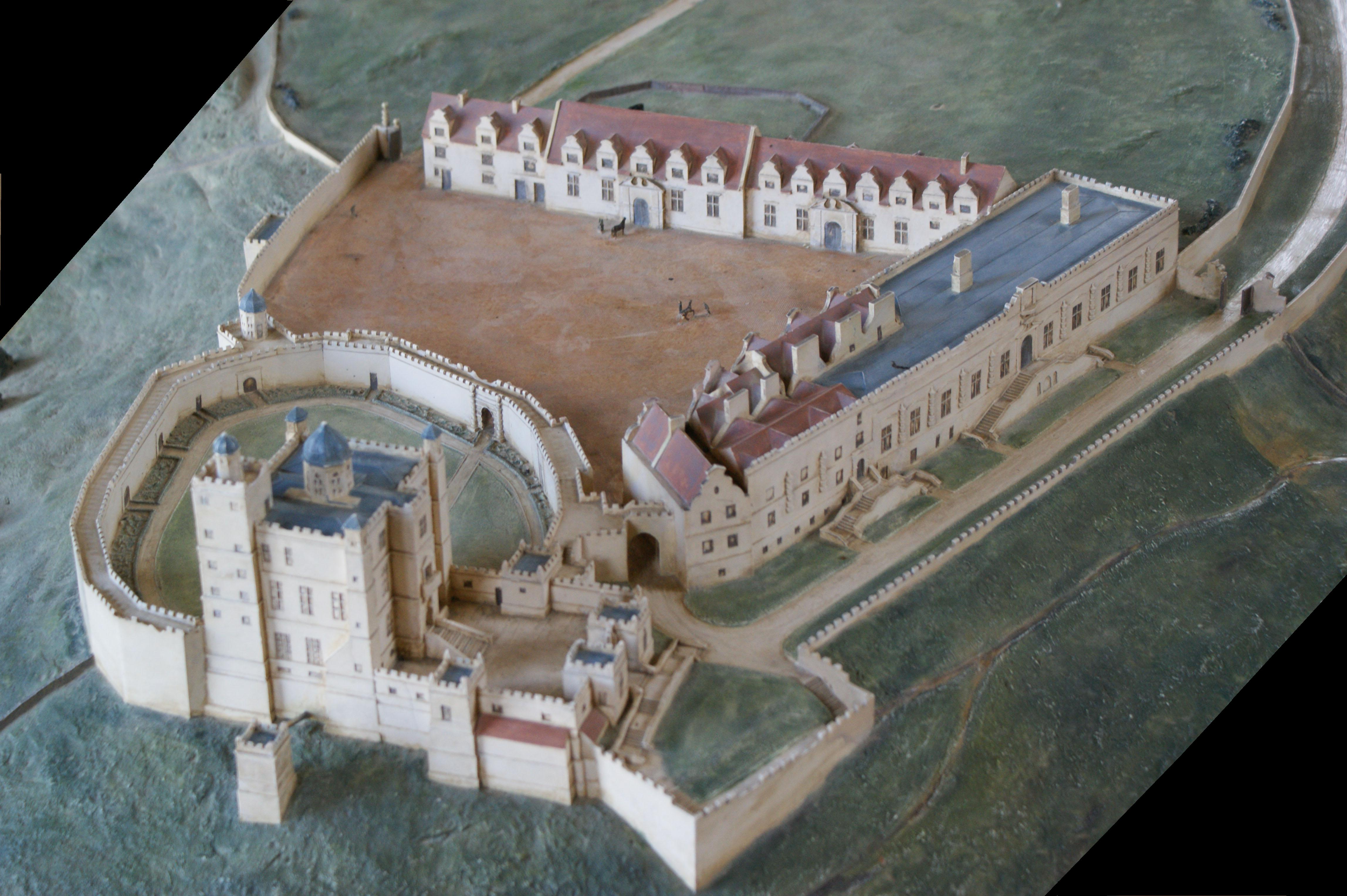
Model of Bolsover Castle in Derbyshire in England, following its redesign at the beginning of the 17th century

In 1603 James VI of Scotland inherited the crown of England, bringing a period of peace between the two countries. The royal court left for London and, as a result – with the exceptions of occasional visits, building work on royal castles north of the border largely ceased. Investment in English castles, especially royal castles, declined dramatically. James sold off many royal castles in England to property developers, including York and Southampton Castle. A royal inspection in 1609 highlighted that the Edwardian castles of North Wales, including Conwy, Beaumaris and Caernarfon were "[u]tterlie decayed".; a subsequent inspection of various English counties in 1635 found a similar picture: Lincoln, Kendal, York, Nottingham, Bristol, Queenborough, Southampton and Rochester were amongst those in a state of dilapidation. In 1642 one pamphlet described many English castles as "muche decayed" and as requiring "much provision" for "warlike defence". Those maintained as private homes; such as Arundel, Berkeley, Carlisle and Winchester were in much better condition, but not necessarily defendable in a conflict; while some such as Bolsover were redesigned as more modern dwellings in a Palladian style. A handful of coastal forts and castles, amongst them Dover Castle, remained in good military condition with adequate defences.

In 1642 the English Civil War broke out, initially between supporters of Parliament and the Royalist supporters of Charles I. The war expanded to include Ireland and Scotland, and dragged on into three separate conflicts in England itself. The war was the first prolonged conflict in Britain to involve the use of artillery and gunpowder. English castles were used for various purposes during the conflict. York Castle formed a key part of the city defences, with a military governor; rural castles such as Goodrich could be used a bases for raiding and for control of the surrounding countryside; larger castles, such as Windsor, became used for holding prisoners of war or as military headquarters. During the war castles were frequently brought back into fresh use: existing defences would be renovated, while walls would be "countermured", or backed by earth, in order to protect from cannons. Towers and keeps were filled with earth to make gun platforms, such as at Carlisle and Oxford Castle. New earth bastions could be added to existing designs, such as at Cambridge and Carew Castle and at the otherwise unfortified Basing House the surrounding Norman ringwork was brought back into commission. The costs could be considerable, with the work at Skipton Castle coming to over £1000.

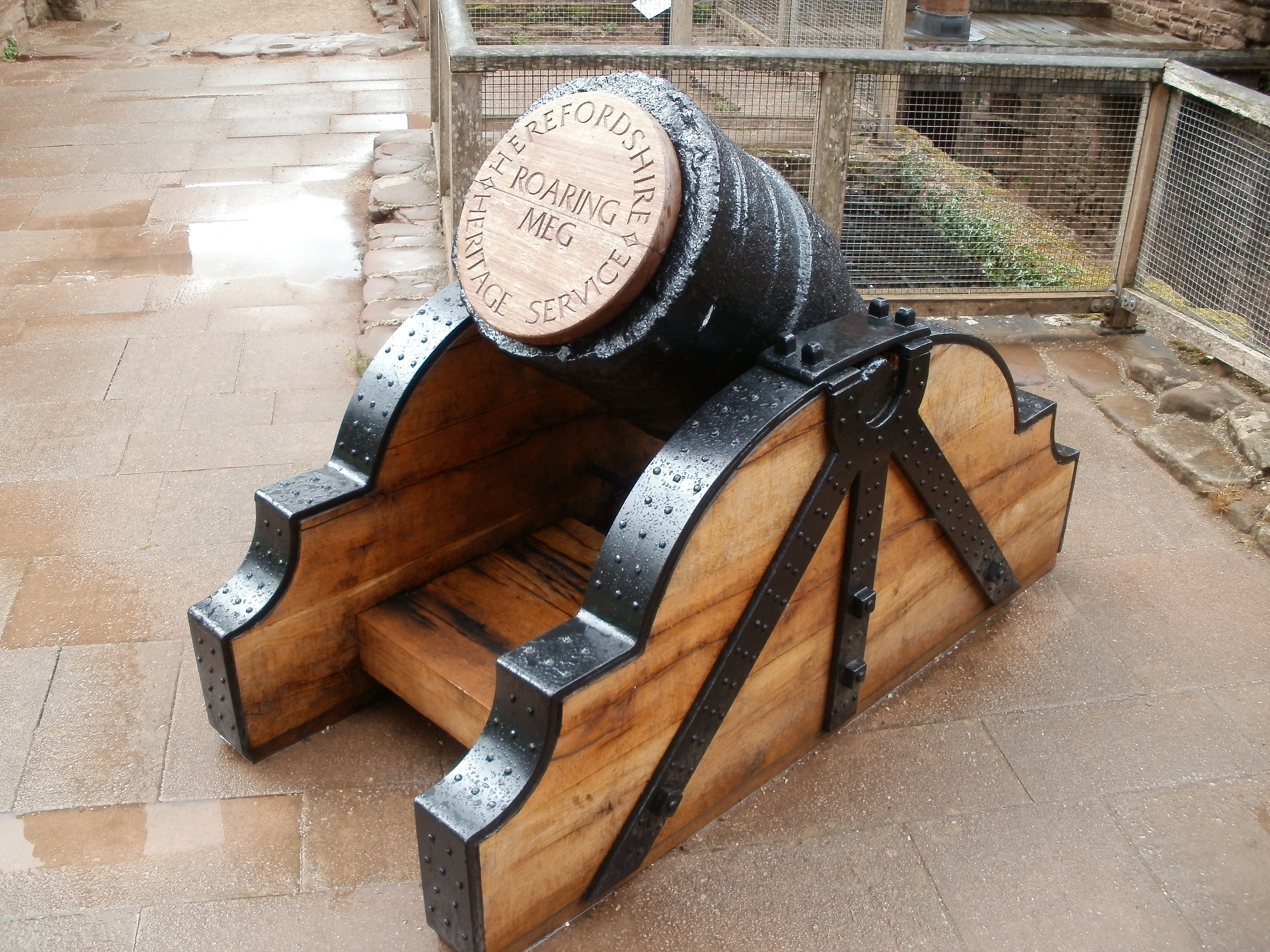
"Roaring Meg", a surviving example of a civil-war mortar at Goodrich Castle in Herefordshire

Sieges became a prominent part of the war with over 300 occurring during the period, many of them involving castles. Indeed, as Robert Liddiard suggests, the "military role of some castles in the seventeenth century is out of all proportion to their medieval histories". Artillery formed an essential part of these sieges, with the "characteristic military action" according to military historian Stephen Bull, being "an attack on a fortified strongpoint" supported by artillery. (Note: Historian Stephen Bull has highlighted that earlier histories of the English Civil War underplayed the importance of artillery, focusing more on the pitched battles fought in the conflict; recent academic work has captured the significance and effectiveness of artillery in the conflict.) The ratio of artillery pieces to defenders varied considerably in sieges, but in all cases there were more guns than in previous conflicts; up to one artillery piece for every nine defenders was not unknown in extreme cases, such as near Pendennis Castle. The growth in the number and size of siege artillery favoured those who had the resources to purchase and deploy these weapons. Artillery had improved by the 1640s but was still not always decisive, as the lighter cannon of the period found it hard to penetrate earth and timber bulwarks and defences – demonstrated in the siege of Corfe. Mortars, able to lob fire over the taller walls, proved particularly effective against castles – in particular those more compact ones with smaller courtyards and open areas, such as at Stirling Castle.

The heavy artillery introduced in England eventually spread to the rest of the British Isles. Although up to a thousand Irish soldiers who had served in Europe returned during the war, bringing with them experience of siege warfare from the Thirty Years' War in Europe, it was the arrival of Oliver Cromwell's train of siege guns in 1649 that transformed the conflict, and the fate of local castles. None of the Irish castles could withstand these Parliamentary weapons and most quickly surrendered. In 1650 Cromwell invaded Scotland and again his heavily artillery proved decisive.

=== The Restoration ===
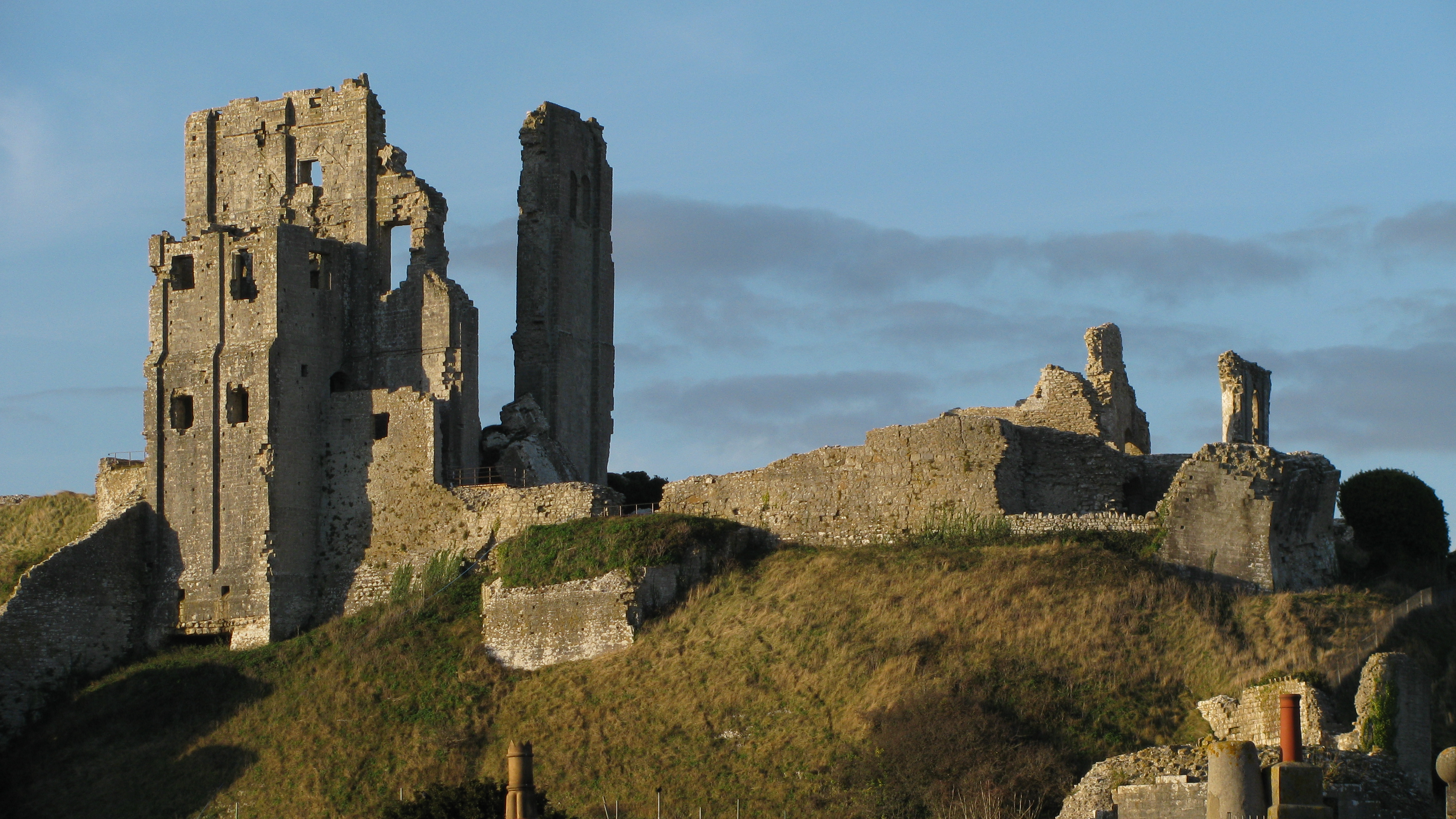
The ruined walls of Corfe Castle in Dorset in England, slighted after the English Civil War

The English Civil War resulted in Parliament issuing orders to slight or damage many castles, particularly in prominent royal regions. This was particularly in the period of 1646 to 1651, with a peak in 1647. Around 150 fortifications were slighted in this period, including 38 town walls and a great many castles. Slighting was quite expensive and took some considerable effort to carry out, so damage was usually done in the most cost-effective fashion with only selected walls being destroyed. In some cases the damage was almost total, such as Wallingford Castle or Pontefract Castle which had been involved in three major sieges and in this case at the request of the townsfolk who wished to avoid further conflict.

By the time that Charles II was restored to the throne in 1660, the major palace-fortresses in England that had survived slighting were typically in a poor state. As historian Simon Thurley has described, the shifting "functional requirements, patterns of movement, modes of transport, aesthetic taste and standards of comfort" amongst royal circles were also changing the qualities being sought in a successful castle. Palladian architecture was growing in popularity, which sat awkwardly with the typical design of a medieval castle. Furthermore, the fashionable French court etiquette at the time required a substantial number of enfiladed rooms, in order to satisfy court protocol, and it was impractical to fit these rooms into many older buildings. A shortage of funds curtailed Charles II's attempts to remodel his remaining castles and the redesign of Windsor was the only one to be fully completed in the Restoration years.

Many castles still retained a defensive role. Castles in England, such as Chepstow and York Castle, were repaired and garrisoned by the king. As military technologies progressed the costs of upgrading older castles could be prohibitive – the estimated £30,000 required for the potential conversion of York in 1682, approximately £4,050,000 in 2009 terms, gives a scale of the potential costs. Castles played a minimal role in the Glorious Revolution of 1688, although some fortifications such as Dover Castle were attacked by mobs unhappy with the religious beliefs of their Catholic governors, and the sieges of King John's Castle in Limerick formed part of the endgame to the war in Ireland. In the north of Britain security problems persisted in Scotland. Cromwellian forces had built a number of new modern forts and barracks, but the royal castles of Edinburgh, Dumbarton and Stirling, along with Dunstaffnage, Dunollie and Ruthven Castle, also continued in use as practical fortifications. Tower houses were being built until the 1640s; after the Restoration the fortified tower house fell out of fashion, but the weak state of the Scottish economy was such that while many larger properties were simply abandoned, the more modest castles continued to be used and adapted as houses, rather than rebuilt. In Ireland tower houses and castles remained in use until after the Glorious Revolution, when events led to a dramatic shift in land ownership and a boom in the building of Palladian country houses; in many cases using timbers stripped from the older, abandoned generation of castles and tower houses.

== 18th century ==
=== Military and governmental use ===
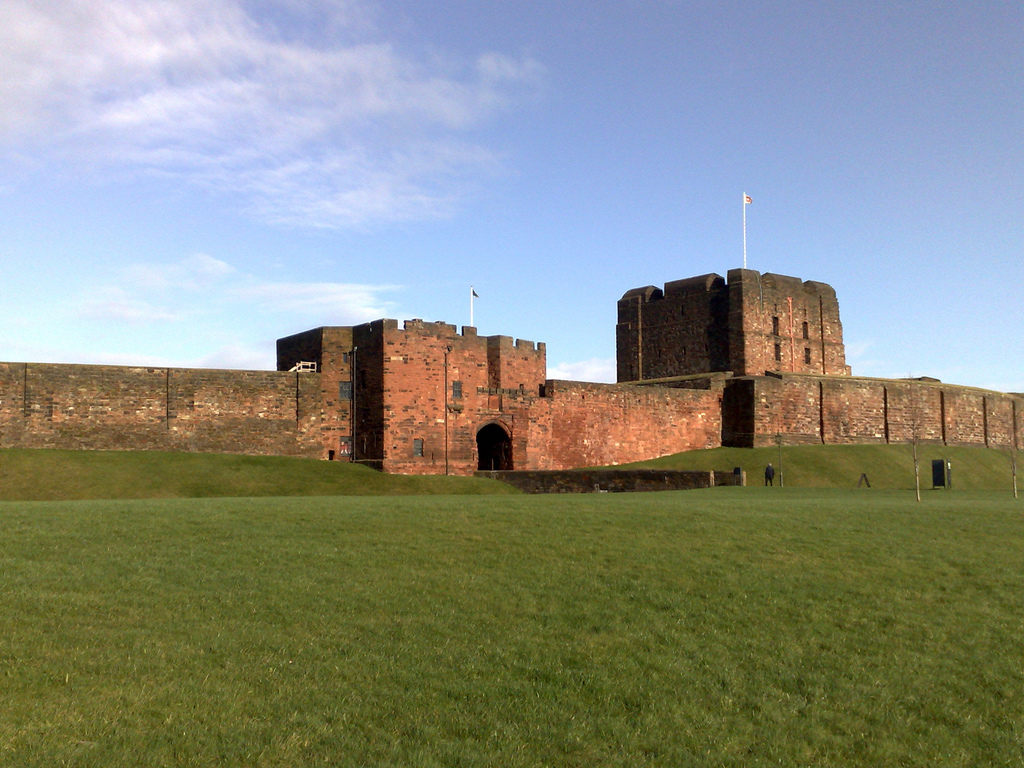
Carlisle Castle in Cumbria in England, modernised in the 18th century to defend against Jacobite invasion

Some castles in Britain and Ireland continued to have modest military utility into the 18th century. Until 1745 a sequence of Jacobite risings threatened the Crown in Scotland, culminating in the rebellion in 1745. Various royal castles were maintained during the period either as part of the English border defences, like Carlisle, or forming part of the internal security measures in Scotland itself, like Stirling Castle. Stirling was able to withstand the Jacobite attack in 1745, although Carlisle was taken; the siege of Blair Castle, at the end of the rebellion in 1746, was the final castle siege to occur in the British Isles. In the aftermath of the conflict Corgaff and many others castles were used as barracks for the forces sent to garrison the Highlands. Some castles, such as Portchester, were used for holding prisoners of war during the Napoleonic Wars at the end of the century and were re-equipped in case of a popular uprising during this revolutionary period. In Ireland Dublin Castle was rebuilt following a fire and reaffirmed as the centre of British administrative and military power.

Many castles remained in use as county jails, run by jailers as effectively private businesses; frequently this involved the gatehouse being maintained as the main prison building, as at Cambridge, Bridgnorth, Lancaster, Newcastle and St Briavels. During the 1770s the prison reformer John Howard conducted his famous survey of prisons and jails, culminating in his 1777 work The State of the Prisons. This documented the poor quality of these castle facilities; prisoners in Norwich Castle lived in a dungeon, with the floor frequently covered by an inch of water; Oxford was "close and offensive"; Worcester was so subject to jail fever that the castle surgeon would not enter the prison; Gloucester was "wretched in the extreme". Howard's work caused a shift in public opinion against the use of these older castle facilities as jails.

=== Social and cultural use ===
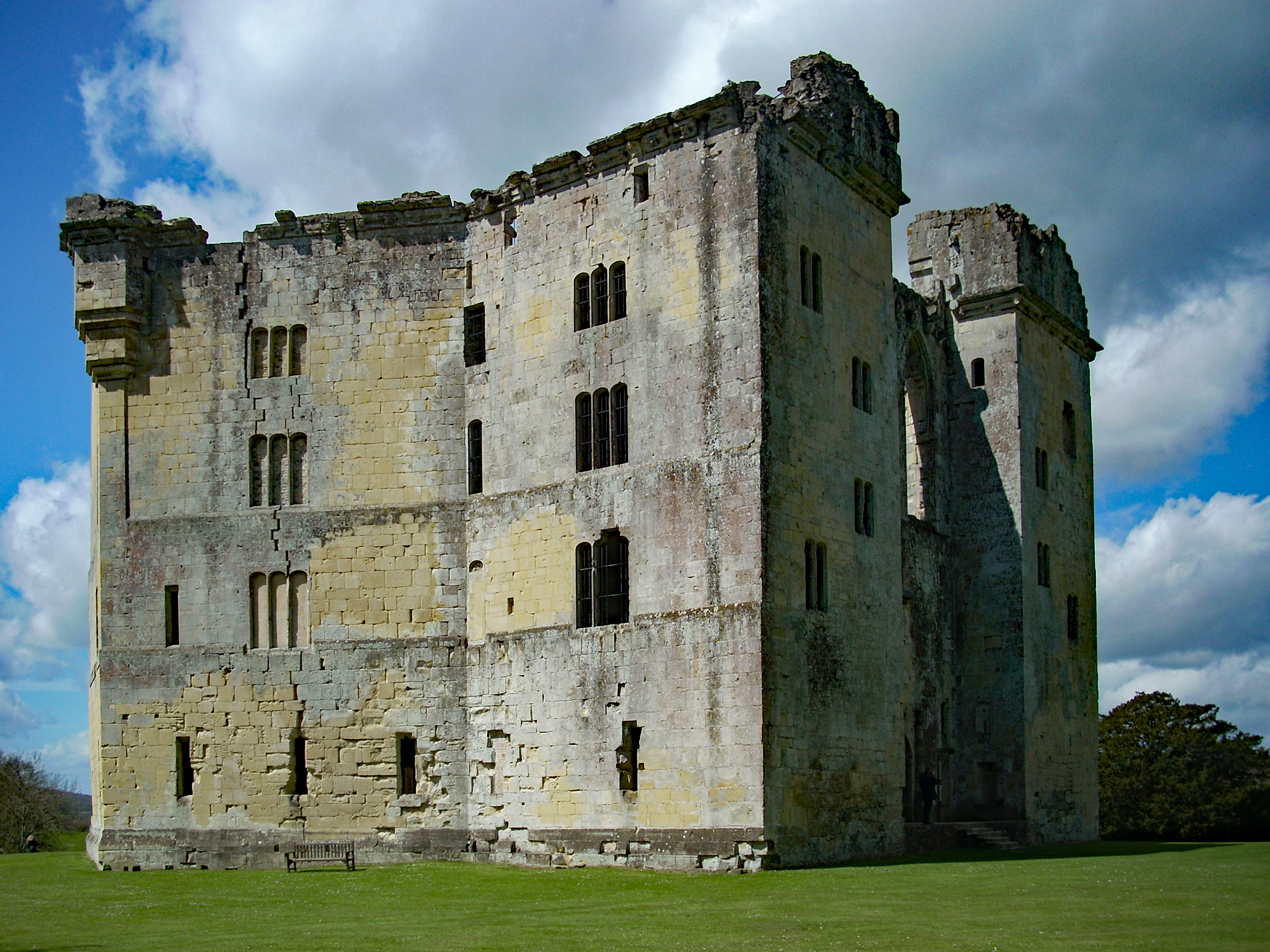
Wardour Castle in Wiltshire in England, preserved in the 18th century as a fashionable ruin

By the middle of the century medieval ruined castles had become fashionable once again. They were considered an interesting counterpoint to the now conventional Palladian classical architecture, and a way of giving a degree of medieval allure to their new owners. Historian Oliver Creighton suggests that the ideal image of a castle by the 1750s included "broken, soft silhouettes and [a] decayed, rough appearance". In some cases the countryside surrounding existing castles was remodelled to highlight the ruins, as at Henderskelfe Castle, or at "Capability" Brown's reworking of Wardour Castle. Alternatively, ruins might be repaired and reinforced to present a more suitable appearance, as at Harewood Castle. In other cases mottes, such as that at Groby Castle in Leicestershire, were reused as the bases for dramatic follies, or alternatively entirely new castle follies could be created; either from scratch or by reusing original stonework, as occurred during the building of Conygar Tower for which various parts of Dunster Castle were cannibalised.

At the same time castles were becoming tourist attractions for the first time. By the 1740s Windsor Castle had become an early tourist attraction; wealthier visitors who could afford to pay the castle keeper could enter, see curiosities such as the castle's narwhal horn, and by the 1750s buy the first guidebooks. The first guidebook to Kenilworth Castle followed in 1777 with many later editions following in the coming decades. By the 1780s and 1790s visitors were beginning to progress as far as Chepstow, where an attractive female guide escorted tourists around the ruins as part of the popular Wye Tour. In Scotland Blair Castle became a popular attraction on account of its landscaped gardens, as did Stirling Castle with its romantic connections. Caernarfon in North Wales appealed to many visitors, especially artists. Irish castles proved less popular, partially because contemporary tourists regarded the country as being somewhat backward and the ruins therefore failed to provide the necessary romantic contrast with modern life.

The appreciation of castles developed as the century progressed. During the 1770s and 1780s the concept of the picturesque ruin was popularised by the English clergyman William Gilpin. Gilpin published several works on his journeys through Britain, expounding the concept of the "correctly picturesque" landscape. Such a landscape, Gilpin argued, usually required a building such as a castle or other ruin to add "consequence" to the natural picture. Paintings in this style usually portrayed castles as indistinct, faintly coloured objects in the distance; in writing, the picturesque account eschewed detail in favour of bold first impressions on the sense. The ruins of Goodrich particularly appealed to Gilpin and his followers; Conwy was, however, too well preserved and uninteresting. By contrast the artistic work of antiquarians James Bentham and James Essex at the end of the century, while stopping short of being genuine archaeology, was detailed and precise enough to provide a substantial base of architectural fine detail on medieval castle features and enabled the work of architects such as Wyatt.

== 19th century ==
=== Military and governmental use ===
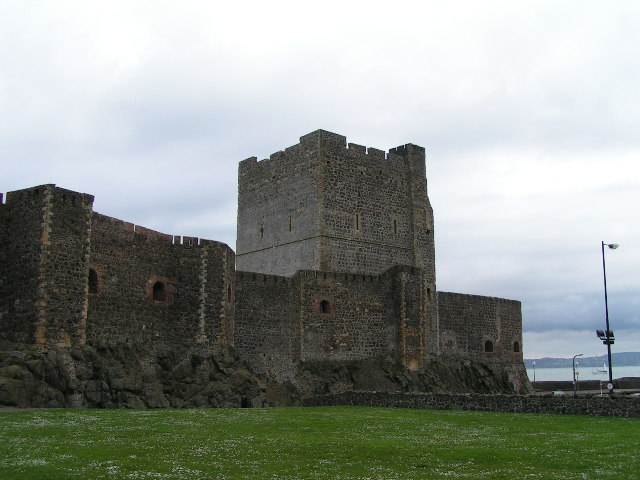
Carrickfergus Castle in Ireland, retrofitted with gun ports for coastal defence in the early 19th century

The military utility of the remaining castles in Britain and Ireland continued to diminish. Some castles became regimental depots, including Carlisle Castle and Chester Castle. Carrickfergus Castle was re-equipped with gunports in order to provide coastal defences at the end of the Napoleonic period. Political instability was a major issue during the early 19th century and the popularity of the Chartist movement led to proposals to refortify the Tower of London in the event of civil unrest. In Ireland Dublin Castle played an increasing role in Ireland as Fenian pressures for independence grew during the century.

The operation of local prisons in locations such as castles had been criticised, since John Howard's work in the 1770s, and pressure for reform continued to grow in the 1850s and 1860s. Reform of the legislation surrounding bankruptcy and debt in 1869 largely removed the threat of imprisonment for unpaid debts, and in the process eliminated the purpose of the debtor's prisons in castles such as St Briavels. Efforts were made to regularise conditions in local prisons but without much success, and these failures led to prison reform in 1877 which nationalised British prisons, including prisons at castles like York.

Compensation was paid to the former owners, although in cases such as York where the facilities were considered so poor as to require complete reconstruction, this payment was denied. In the short term this led to a 39 per cent reduction in the number of prisons in England, including some famous castle prisons such as Norwich; over the coming years, centralisation and changes in prison design led to the closure of most remaining castle prisons.

=== Social and cultural use ===
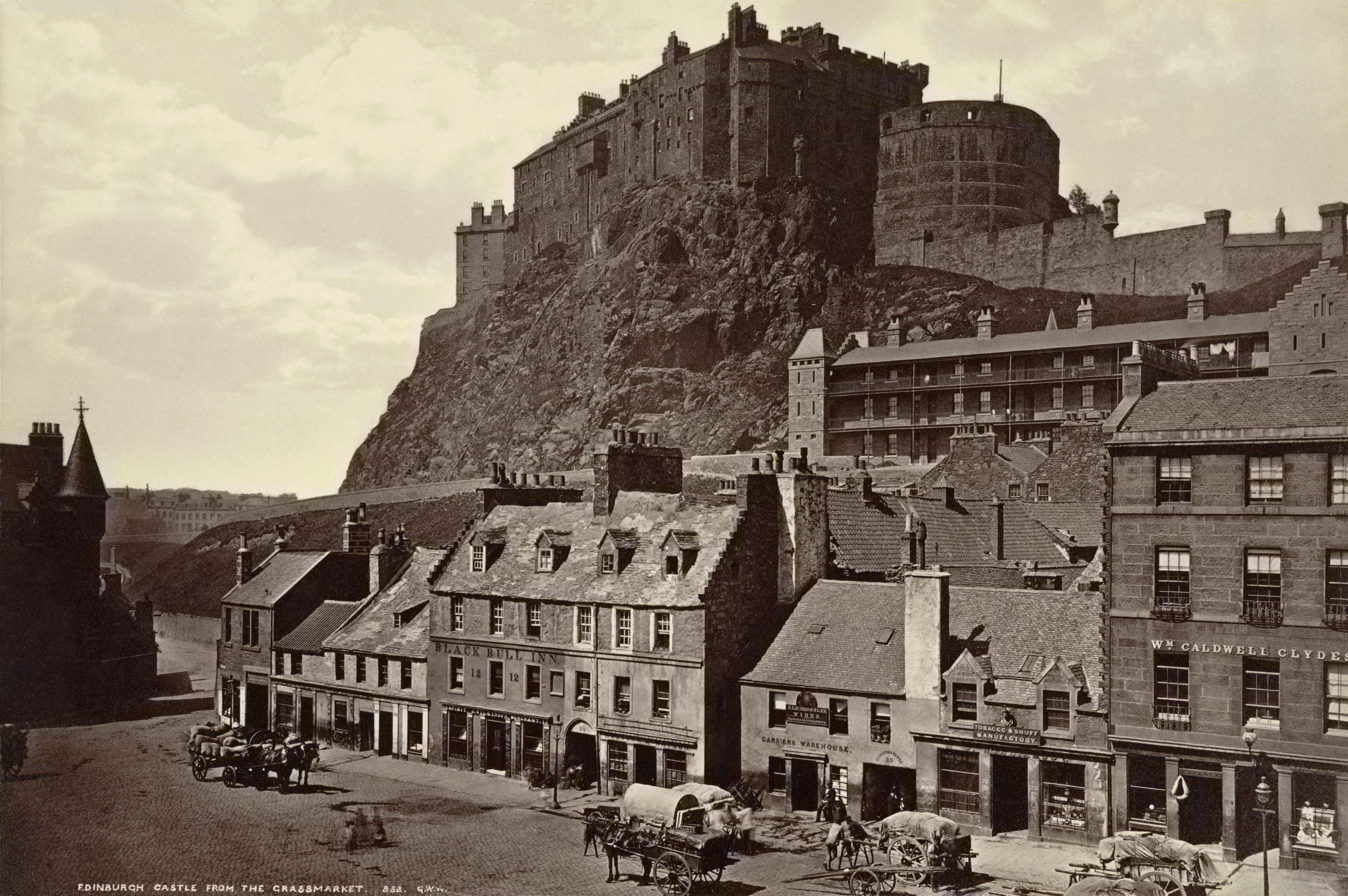
Edinburgh Castle in Scotland in the middle of the 19th century, already a popular tourist location by the Victorian period

Many castles saw increased visitors by tourists, helped by better transport links and the growth of the railways. The armouries at the Tower of London opened for tourists in 1828 with 40,000 visitors in their first year; by 1858 the numbers had grown to over 100,000 a year. Attractions such as Warwick Castle received 6,000 visitors during 1825 to 1826, many of them travelling from the growing industrial towns in the nearby Midlands, while Victorian tourists recorded being charged six-pence to wander around the ruins of Goodrich Castle.

The spread of the railway system across Wales and the Marches strongly influenced the flow of tourists to the region's castles. In Scotland tourist tours became increasingly popular during the 19th century, usually starting at Edinburgh complete with Edinburgh Castle, and then spending up to two weeks further north, taking advantage of the expanding rail and steamer network. Blair Castle remained popular, but additional castles joined the circuit – Cawdor Castle became popular once the railway line reached north to Fort William.

Purchasing and reading guidebooks became an increasingly important part of visiting castles; by the 1820s visitors could buy an early guidebook at Goodrich outlining the castle's history, the first guidebook to the Tower of London was published in 1841 and Scottish castle guidebooks became well known for providing long historical accounts of their sites, often drawing on the plots of Romantic novels for the details. Indeed, Sir Walter Scott's historical novels Ivanhoe and Kenilworth helped to establish the popular Victorian image of a Gothic medieval castle. Scott's novels set in Scotland also popularised several northern castles, including Tantallon which was featured in Marmion. Histories of Ireland began to stress the role of castles in the rise of Protestantism and "British values" in Ireland, although tourism remained limited.

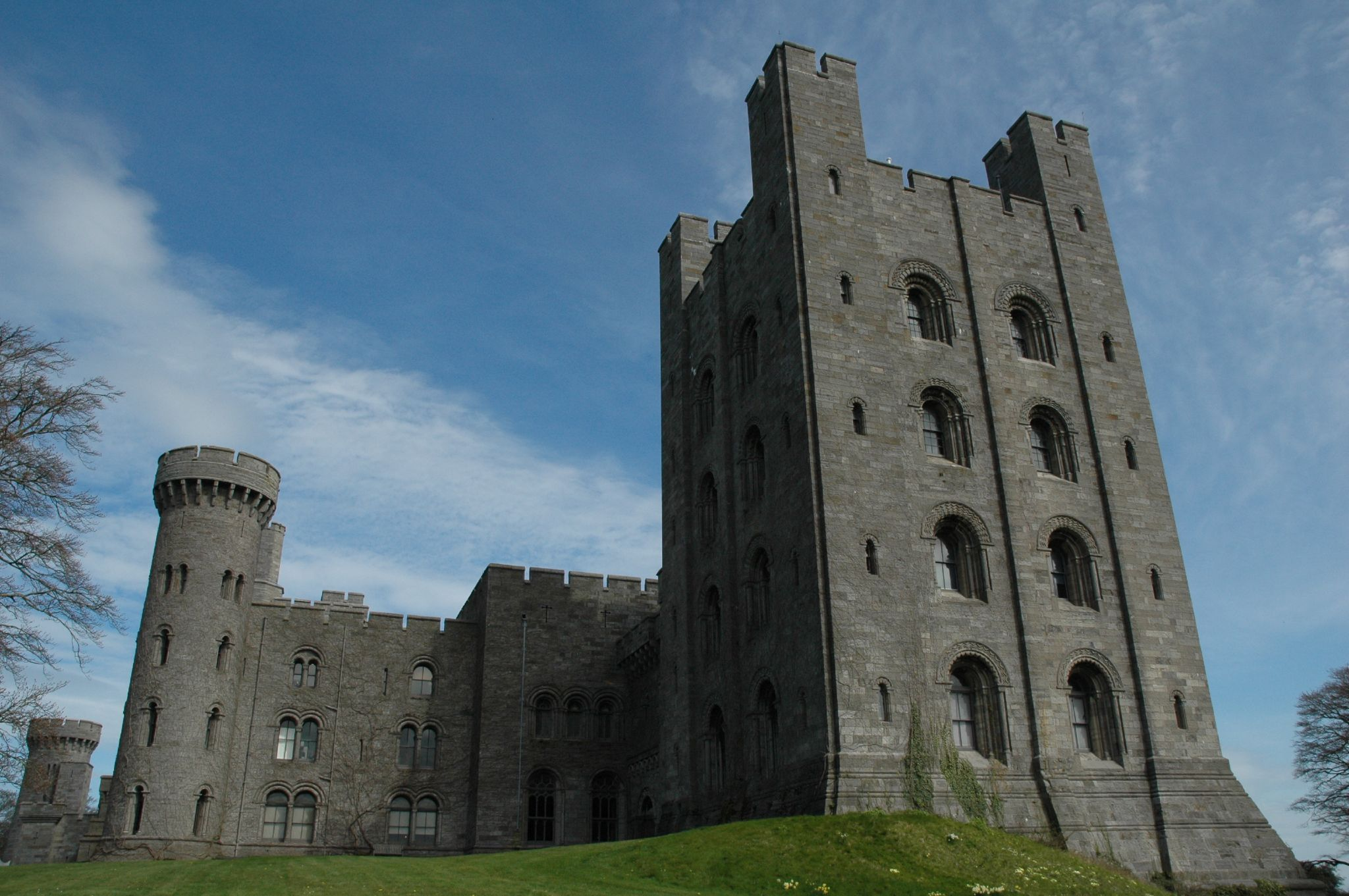
Penrhyn Castle in Wales, an early 19th-century recreation of a Norman castle

One response to this popularity was in commissioning the construction of replica castles. These were particularly popular at beginning of the 19th century, and again later in the Victorian period. Design manuals were published offering details of how to recreate the appearance of an original Gothic castles in a new build, leading to a flurry of work, such as Eastnor in 1815, the fake Norman castle of Penrhyn between 1827 and 1837 and the imitation Edwardian castle of Goodrich Court in 1828. The later Victorians built the Welsh Castell Coch in the 1880s as a fantasy Gothic construction and the last such replica, Castle Drogo, was built as late as 1911.

Another response was to improve existing castles, bringing their often chaotic historic features into line with a more integrated architectural aesthetic in a style often termed Gothic Revivalism. There were numerous attempts to restore or rebuild castles so as to produce a consistently Gothic style, informed by genuine medieval details, a movement in which the architect Anthony Salvin was particularly prominent – as illustrated by his reworking of Alnwick and much of Windsor Castle. A similar trend can be seen at Rothesay where William Burges renovated the older castle to produce a more "authentic" design, heavily influenced by the work of the French architect Eugène Viollet-le-Duc.

North of the border this resulted in the distinctive style of Scots Baronial Style architecture, which took French and traditional medieval Scottish features and reinvented them in a baroque style. The style also proved popular in Ireland with George Jones' Oliver Castle in the 1850s, for example, forming a good example of the fashion. As with Gothic Revivalism, Scots Baronial architects frequently "improved" existing castles: Floors Castle was transformed in 1838 by William Playfair who added grand turrets and cupolas. In a similar way the 16th-century tower house of Lauriston Castle was turned into the Victorian ideal of a "rambling medieval house". The style spread south and the famous architect Edward Blore added a Scots Baronial touch to his work at Windsor.

With this pace of change concerns had begun to grow by the middle of the century about the threat to medieval buildings in Britain, and in 1877 William Morris established the Society for the Protection of Ancient Buildings. One result of public pressure was the passing of the Ancient Monuments Protection Act 1882, but the provisions of the act focused on unoccupied prehistoric structures and medieval buildings such as castles were exempted from it leaving no legal protection.

== 20th–21st century ==
=== 1900–1945 ===
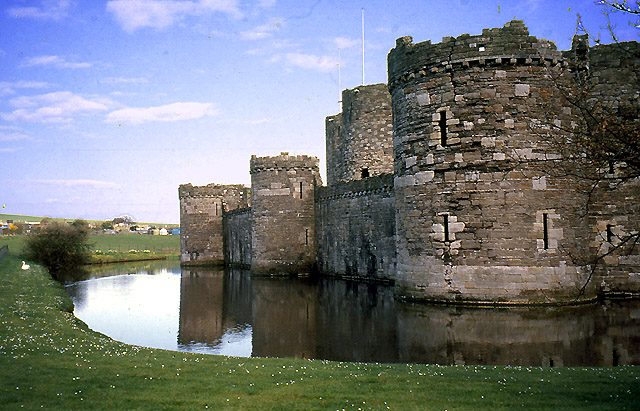
Beaumaris Castle in Wales, showing its restored appearance following work in the 1920s

During the first half of the century several castles were maintained, or brought back into military use. During the Irish War of Independence Dublin Castle remained the centre of the British administration, military and intelligence operations in Ireland until the transfer of power and the castle to the Irish Free State in 1922. During the Second World War the Tower of London was used to hold and execute suspected spies, and was used to briefly detain Rudolf Hess, Adolf Hitler's deputy, in 1941. Edinburgh Castle was used as a prisoner of war facility, while Windsor Castle was stripped of more delicate royal treasures and used to guard the British royal family from the dangers of the Blitz.

Some coastal castles were used to support naval operations: Dover Castle's medieval fortifications used as basis for defences across the Dover Strait; Pitreavie Castle in Scotland was used to support the Royal Navy; and Carrickfergus Castle in Ireland was used as a coastal defence base. Some castles, such as Cambridge and Pevensey, were brought into local defence plans in case of a German invasion. A handful of these castles retained a military role after the war; Dover was used as a nuclear war command centre into the 1950s, while Pitreavie was used by NATO until the turn of the 21st century.

The strong cultural interest in British castles persisted in the 20th century. In some cases this had destructive consequences as wealthy collectors bought and removed architectural features and other historical artefacts from castles for their own collections, a practice that produced significant official concern. Some of the more significant cases included St Donat's Castle, bought by William Randolph Hearst in 1925 and then decorated with numerous medieval buildings removed from their original sites around Britain, and the case of Hornby, where many parts of the castle were sold off and sent to buyers in the United States.

Partially as a result of these events, increasing legal powers were introduced to protect castles – acts of parliament in 1900 and 1910 widened the terms of the earlier legislation on national monuments to allow the inclusion of castles. An act of Parliament in 1913 introduced preservation orders for the first time and these powers were extended in 1931. Similarly, after the end of the Irish Civil War, the new Irish state took early action to extend and strengthen the previous British legislation to protect Irish national monuments.

Around the beginning of the century there were a number of major restoration projects on British castles. Before the outbreak of the First World War work was undertaken at Chepstow, Bodiam, Caernarfon and Tattershal; after the end of the war various major state funded restoration projects occurred in the 1920s with Pembroke, Caerphilly and Goodrich amongst the largest of these. This work typically centred on cutting back the vegetation encroaching on castle ruins, especially ivy, and removing damaged or unstable stonework; castles such as Beaumaris saw their moats cleaned and reflooded. Some castles such as Eilean Donan in Scotland were substantially rebuilt in the inter-war years. The early UK film industry took an interest in castles as potential sets, starting with Ivanhoe filmed at Chepstow Castle in 1913 and starring US leading actor King Baggot.

=== 1945–21st century ===
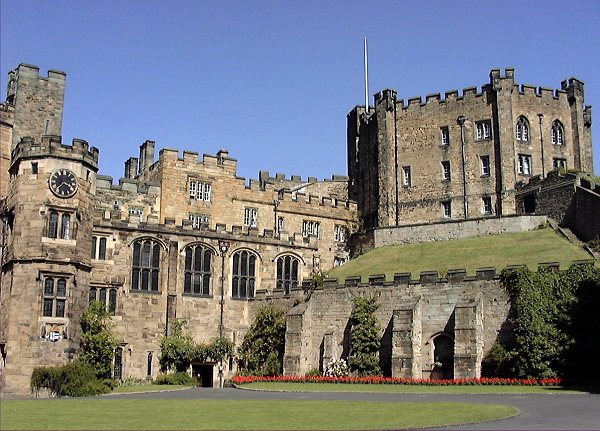
Durham Castle in northern England, declared a UNESCO World Heritage Site in the 1980s

After the Second World War picturesque ruins of castles became unfashionable. The conservation preference was to restore castles so as to produce what Oliver Creighton and Robert Higham have described as a "meticulously cared for fabric, neat lawns and [a] highly regulated, visitor-friendly environment", although the reconstruction or reproduction of the original appearance of castles was discouraged. As a result, the stonework and walls of today's castles, used as tourist attractions, are usually in much better condition than would have been the case in the medieval period. Preserving the broader landscapes of the past also rose in importance, reflected in the decision by the UNESCO World Heritage Site programme to internationally recognise several British castles including Beaumaris, Caernarfon, Conwy, Harlech, Durham and the Tower of London as deserving of special international cultural significance in the 1980s.

The single largest group of English castles are now those owned by English Heritage, created out of the former Ministry of Works in 1983. The National Trust increasingly acquired castle properties in England in the 1950s, and is the second largest single owner, followed by the various English local authorities and finally a small number of private owners. Royal castles such as the Tower of London and Windsor are owned by the Occupied Royal Palaces Estate on behalf of the nation. Similar organisations exist in Scotland, where the National Trust for Scotland was established 1931, and in Ireland, where An Taisce was created in 1948 to working alongside the Irish Ministry of Works to maintain castles and other sites. Some new organisations have emerged in recent years to manage castles, such as the Landmark Trust and the Irish Landmark Trust, which have restored a number of castles in Britain and Ireland over the last few decades.

Castles remain highly popular attractions: in 2018 nearly 2.9 million people visited the Tower of London, 2.1 million visited Edinburgh Castle, 466,000 visited Leeds Castle and 365,000 visited Dover Castle. Ireland, which for many years had not exploited the tourist potential of its castle heritage, began to encourage more tourists in the 1960s and 1970s and Irish castles are now a core part of the Irish tourist industry. British and Irish castles are today also closely linked to the international film industry, with tourist visits to castles now often involving not simply a visit to a historic site, but also a visit to the location of a popular film.

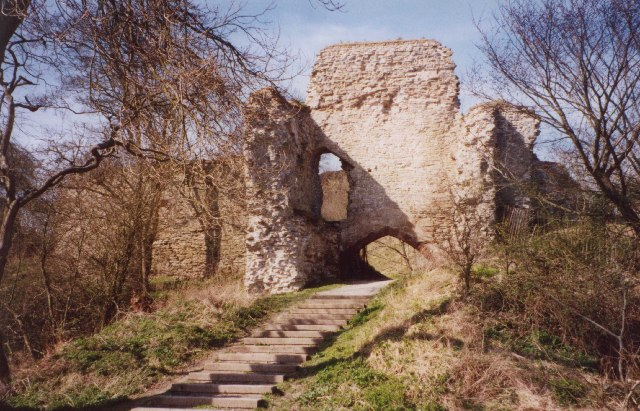
Wigmore Castle in Herefordshire in western England, preserved in an unconserved state following its acquisition by English Heritage in 1995

The management and handling of Britain's historic castles has at times been contentious. Castles in the late 20th and early 21st century are usually considered part of the heritage industry, in which historic sites and events are commercially presented as visitor attractions. Some academics, such as David Lowenthal, have critiqued the way in which these histories are constantly culturally and socially reconstructed and condemned the "commercial debasement" of sites such as the Tower of London.

The challenge of how to manage these historic properties has often required very practical decisions. At one end of the spectrum owners and architects have had to deal with the practical challenges of repairing smaller decaying castles used as private houses, such as that at Picton Castle where damp proved a considerable problem. At the other end of the scale the fire at Windsor Castle in 1992 opened up a national debate about how the burnt-out castle wing should be replaced, the degree to which modern designs should be introduced and who should pay the £37 million costs (£50.2 million in 2009 terms).

At Kenilworth the speculative and commercial reconstruction of the castle gardens in an Elizabethan style led to a vigorous academic debate over the interpretation of archaeological and historical evidence. Trends in conservation have altered and, in contrast to the prevailing post-war approach to conservation, recent work at castles such as Wigmore, acquired by English Heritage in 1995, has attempted to minimise the degree of intervention to the site.

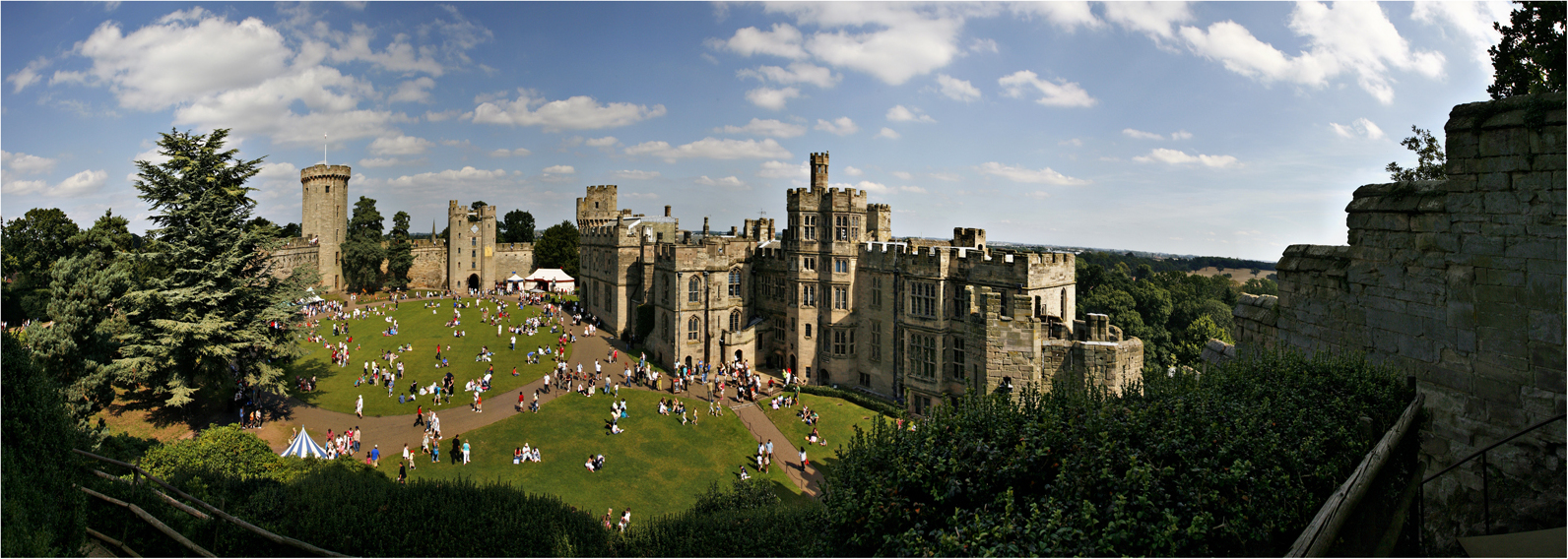
Tourists at Warwick Castle in central England

== Historiography ==
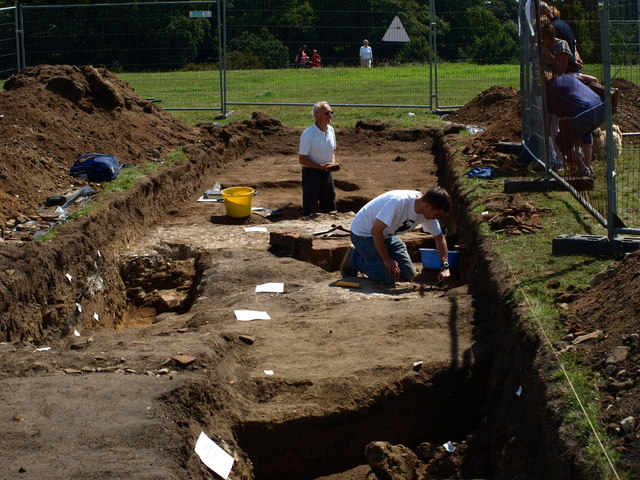
Archaeological investigations in 2009 attempt to identify the exact location of Ampthill Castle in Bedfordshire

The earliest histories of British and Irish castles were recorded, albeit in a somewhat fragmented fashion, by John Leland in the 16th century and, by the 19th century, historical analysis of castles had become popular. Victorian historians such as George Clark and John Parker concluded that British castles had been built for the purposes of military defence, but believed that their history was pre-Conquest – concluding that the mottes across the countryside had been built by either the Romans or Celts.

The study of castles by historians and archaeologists developed considerably during the 20th century. The early-20th-century historian and archaeologist Ella Armitage published a ground-breaking book in 1912, arguing convincingly that British castles were in fact a Norman introduction, while historian Alexander Thompson also published in the same year, charting the course of the military development of English castles through the Middle Ages. The Victoria County History of England began to document the country's castles on an unprecedented scale, providing an additional resource for historical analysis.

After the Second World War the historical analysis of British castles was dominated by Arnold Taylor, R. Allen Brown and D. J. Cathcart King. These academics made use of a growing amount of archaeological evidence, as the 1940s saw an increasing number of excavations of motte and bailey castles, and the number of castle excavations as a whole went on to double during the 1960s. With an increasing number of castle sites under threat in urban areas, a public scandal in 1972 surrounding the development of the Baynard's Castle site in London contributed to reforms and a re-prioritisation of funding for rescue archaeology. Despite this the number of castle excavations fell between 1974 and 1984, with the archaeological work focusing on conducting excavations on a greater number of small-scale, but fewer large-scale sites. The study of British castles remained primarily focused on analysing their military role, however, drawing on the evolutionary model of improvements suggested by Thompson earlier in the century.

In the 1990s a wide-reaching reassessment of the interpretation of British castles took place. A vigorous academic discussion over the history and meanings behind Bodiam Castle began a debate, which concluded that many features of castles previously seen as primarily military in nature were in fact constructed for reasons of status and political power. As historian Robert Liddiard has described it, the older paradigm of "Norman militarism" as the driving force behind the formation of Britain's castles was replaced by a model of "peaceable power". The next twenty years was characterised by an increasing number of major publications on castle studies, examining the social and political aspects of the fortifications, as well as their role in the historical landscape. Although not unchallenged, this "revisionist" perspective remains the dominant theme in the academic literature today.
