= List of scheduled monuments =

In the United Kingdom, a scheduled monument is a 'nationally important' archaeological site or historic building, given protection against unauthorised change. The various pieces of legislation used for legally protecting heritage assets from damage and destruction are grouped under the term ‘designation’. The protection given to scheduled monuments is given under the Ancient Monuments and Archaeological Areas Act 1979, which is a different law from that used for listed buildings (which fall within the town and country planning system). A heritage asset is a part of the historic environment that is valued because of its historic, archaeological, architectural or artistic interest. These are judged to be important enough to have extra legal protection through designation.

There are about 20,000 scheduled monuments in England representing about 37,000 heritage assets. Of the tens of thousands of scheduled monuments in the UK, most are inconspicuous archaeological sites, but some are large ruins. According to the 1979 Act, a monument cannot be a structure which is occupied as a dwelling, used as a place of worship or protected under the Protection of Wrecks Act 1973. A protected historic asset that is occupied would be designated as a listed building.

== England ==
- Scheduled monuments in Bedfordshire
- Scheduled monuments in Berkshire
- Scheduled monuments in Bristol
- Scheduled monuments in Buckinghamshire
- Scheduled monuments in Cambridgeshire
- Scheduled monuments in Cheshire
  - List of scheduled monuments in Cheshire dated to before 1066
  - List of scheduled monuments in Cheshire (1066–1539)
  - List of scheduled monuments in Cheshire since 1539
- Scheduled monuments in Cornwall
- Scheduled monuments in Cumbria
- Scheduled monuments in Derbyshire
  - Scheduled monuments in Amber Valley
  - Scheduled monuments in Bolsover
  - Scheduled monuments in Chesterfield
  - Scheduled monuments in Derbyshire Dales
  - Scheduled monuments in the Borough of Erewash
  - Scheduled monuments in High Peak
  - Scheduled monuments in North East Derbyshire
  - Scheduled monuments in South Derbyshire
- Scheduled monuments in Devon
  - Scheduled monuments and listed buildings in Exeter
- Scheduled monuments in Dorset
- Scheduled monuments in County Durham
- Scheduled monuments in East Sussex
- Scheduled monuments in Essex
- Scheduled monuments in Gloucestershire
- Scheduled monuments in Greater London
- Scheduled monuments in Greater Manchester
- Scheduled monuments in Hampshire
- Scheduled monuments in Herefordshire
- Scheduled monuments in Hertfordshire
- Scheduled monuments in Kent
  - Scheduled monuments in Maidstone
- Scheduled monuments in Lancashire
- Scheduled monuments in Leicestershire
  - Scheduled monuments in Leicester
- Scheduled monuments in Lincolnshire
  - List of scheduled monuments in South Kesteven
- Scheduled monuments in Merseyside
- Scheduled monuments in Norfolk
- Scheduled monuments in North Yorkshire
- Scheduled monuments in Northamptonshire
- Scheduled monuments in Northumberland
- Scheduled monuments in Nottinghamshire
- Scheduled monuments in Oxfordshire
- Scheduled monuments in Shropshire
- Scheduled monuments in Somerset
  - Scheduled monuments in Bath and North East Somerset
  - List of scheduled monuments in Mendip
  - List of scheduled monuments in North Somerset
  - List of scheduled monuments in Sedgemoor
  - List of scheduled monuments in South Somerset
  - List of scheduled monuments in Taunton Deane
  - List of scheduled monuments in West Somerset
- Scheduled monuments in South Yorkshire
- Scheduled monuments in Staffordshire
- Scheduled monuments in Suffolk
- Scheduled monuments in Surrey
- Scheduled monuments in Tyne and Wear
- Scheduled monuments in Warwickshire
- Scheduled monuments in the West Midlands
  - Scheduled monuments in Birmingham
  - Scheduled monuments in Coventry
- Scheduled monuments in West Sussex
- Scheduled monuments in West Yorkshire
- Scheduled monuments in Wiltshire
- Scheduled monuments in Worcestershire

== Northern Ireland ==
- List of scheduled monuments in Northern Ireland

== Scotland ==
- Lists of scheduled monuments in Scotland

== Wales ==
- Scheduled monuments in Wales
