= Scheduled monuments in Herefordshire =

List of scheduled monuments in the county of Herefordshire, England

There are 273 scheduled monuments in the county of Herefordshire, England. These protected sites date from the Neolithic period in some cases and include barrows, churchyard crosses, ruined abbeys, castles, and Iron Age hill forts. In the United Kingdom, the scheduling of monuments was first initiated to ensure the preservation of "nationally important" archaeological sites or historic buildings. Protection is given to scheduled monuments under the Ancient Monuments and Archaeological Areas Act 1979.

== Notable scheduled monuments in Herefordshire ==
Image	Name	Location	Date	Notes
	Aconbury Camp	51°59′37″N 2°43′28″W	Iron Age	Large univallate hillfort located on Aconbury Hill.
	Arthur's Stone chambered tomb	52°04′56.3″N 02°59′43.3″W	Neolithic era	This burial monument is linked with the legend of King Arthur.
	Bach Camp	52°04′56.3″N 02°59′43.3″W		Hill fort
	Brampton Bryan Castle	52.3478°N 2.9263°W	late 13th century-14th century AD	14th century castle ruins.
	Court House Dovecote	52.3243°N 2.7479°W	17th century	Dovecote
	Dinedor Camp	52.0235°N 2.6963°W	Iron Age	Iron Age Hillfort.
	Dore Abbey	51.96778°N 2.89368°W	1147 AD	Cistercian abbey ruins.
	Garway Dovecote	51.8976°N 2.7929°W	14th century	Dovecote

== See also ==
- Grade I listed buildings in Herefordshire
- List of scheduled monuments in the United Kingdom
