= Giant's Grave =

Giant's Grave may refer to:

== District ==
- Giant's Grave, a district within the Briton Ferry West electoral ward, Neath Port Talbot, Wales

== Music ==
- "Giant's Grave", a folk song about the docks at Briton Ferry

== Prehistoric and Neolithic sites ==
=== Poland ===
- Graves of Giants, enormous tombs, megalithic structures in Kuyavia, Poland

=== Sardinia ===
- Giants' grave, a type of Sardinian megalithic gallery grave built during the Bronze Age by the Nuragic civilization

=== United Kingdom ===
- Giant's Grave, an archaeological site in County Antrim
- Giant's Grave, a tumulus in Coventry
- Giant's Grave, two standing stones near Black Combe, Cumbria
- Giants' Graves, two Neolithic chambered tombs on the Isle of Arran in Scotland
- Giant's Grave, a promontory fort and cliff castle near the village of Oare in Wiltshire
- Giant's Grave, a feature of the prehistoric site at Parc Cwm long cairn, Swansea, Wales

== Sports ==
- Giants Grave F.C., an amateur Welsh football team based in Giant's Grave, Neath Port Talbot, Wales
