= Scheduled monuments in Bedfordshire =

List of protected ancient monuments in Bedfordshire, England

There are 134 scheduled monuments in the county of Bedfordshire in the East of England. These protected sites date from the Neolithic period in some cases and include barrows, churches, castle earthworks, moated sites and medieval priories. In the United Kingdom, the scheduling of monuments was first initiated to ensure the preservation of "nationally important" archaeological sites or historic buildings. Protection is given to scheduled monuments under the Ancient Monuments and Archaeological Areas Act 1979.

== Notable scheduled monuments in Bedfordshire ==
Image	Name	Location	Date	Notes
	All Saints Church, Segenhoe	Ridgmont	12th century	Built in the 12th century. The church was abandoned in 1855 when a new, larger church on High Street, also named All Saints, was completed.
	Bedford Castle	Dunstable	after 1100 AD	A Norman motte and bailey castle built by Henry I. It was built on a previous Anglo-Saxon defensive site north of the River Great Ouse.
	Dunstable Priory	Dunstable	1131 AD	Augustinian priory established by Henry I. The annulment of Catherine of Aragon's marriage to Henry VIII was announced here in 1533.
	Flitwick Castle	Flitwick	11th century	The earthwork remains of a medieval timber Motte-and-bailey castle. The castle was mentioned in the Domesday Book in 1086.
	Great Barford Bridge	Great Barford	15th century	The bridge, built in the 15th century, crosses the River Great Ouse.
	Houghton House	Houghton Conquest	1621	Ruined 17th-century mansion built between 1615 and 1621 for Mary Sidney, Dowager Countess of Pembroke. Sidney hosted James I at the new completed house in 1621. She died of smallpox in London a short time later.
	Someries Castle	Luton	15th century	Built by William de Someries on or near the location of a 13th century moated manor house. The remains of a 16th/17th century garden lie adjacent to the ruined castle.

== See also ==
- List of scheduled monuments
- List of World Heritage Sites in the United Kingdom
