= Scheduled monuments in Cumbria =

There are 1274 scheduled monuments in the county of Cumbria, in North West England. These protected sites date from the Neolithic period and include barrows, stone circles, Roman forts, standing stones, 19th-century industrial sites, abbeys, and ruined castles. In the United Kingdom, the scheduling of monuments was first initiated to ensure the preservation of "nationally important" archaeological sites or historic buildings. Protection is given to scheduled monuments under the Ancient Monuments and Archaeological Areas Act 1979.

== Notable scheduled monuments in Cumbria ==
Image	Name	Location	Date	Notes
	Ambleside Roman Fort	54.4223°N 2.9688°W	1st century AD	The fort was first occupied around 90 AD with the construction of a timber and turf fort. A larger stone fort replaced the timber fort during the reign of Hadrian (117-138 AD) and was probably abandoned 138–161 AD.
	Appleby Castle	54.57423°N 2.48878°W	Early 12th century	A well-preserved medieval castle with a large quantity of surviving earthwork defenses and standing structures.
	Arnside Tower	54.1841°N 2.8335°W	15th century	A late medieval tower house. Tower houses were common in the border regions of northern England and southern Scotland. Arnside tower is an excellent example of a Cumbrian peel tower. .
	Birdoswald Roman Fort & Hadrian's Wall	54.9894°N 2.6023°W	early 2nd century AD	The Birdoswald Roman fort and a section of Hadrian's Wall and vallum between the River Irthing and the field boundaries east of milecastle 50.
	Brough Castle	54.5218°N 2.3244°W	1092	The monument includes Brough Castle and Brough Roman fort. The surviving castle remains are an excellent example of six centuries of continuous improvements. Substantial earthworks of the Roman fort is partially covered by the castle.
	Brougham Castle	54°39′14″N 2°43′09″W	early 13th century	The castle's surviving remains include a great keep, a rare double gatehouse and a commanding southwest corner tower, known as the 'Tower of League'.
	Calder Abbey	54°26′39″N 3°27′58″W	1134	Twelve monks from Furness Abbey, Barrow-in-Furness, Cumbria, established the Savigniac abbey at Calder. The abbey became Cistercian in 1148.
	Carlisle Castle	54.897260°N 2.941936°W	1092	The monument consists of the surviving remains of the castle's medieval tower keep castle, a section of Carlisle city wall, a 16th-century battery, and the underground remains of much of the Roman fort known as Luguvalium.
	Castlerigg stone circle	54°36′10″N 3°05′54″W	3200 BC to 2500 BC	An oval enclosure of 38 standing stones which contains a smaller enclosure and two barrows, and an outlying stone.
	Dalton Castle, Cumbria	54.1554°N 3.1865°W	14th century	The monument includes both the above ground and below ground remains of Dalton Castle, which was previously used as the manorial courthouse of Furness Abbey. It was used as a prison from the early 13th century to the late 18th century.
	Furness Abbey	54°8′7″N 3°11′52″W	1123	The abbey was established by Stephen, King of England. The surviving remains consist of most of the east end and west tower of the church, the chapter house and the cloister buildings.
	Giant's Grave St Andrew's Church	54.66428°N 2.75107°W	12th century	The monument includes two Anglian cross shafts and four hogback stones, located in St Andrew's churchyard, Penrith. It also includes a pair of tenth-century Anglian crosses.
	Giant's Grave, Cumbria	54.21833°N 3.32633°W	Neolithic era	Two Neolithic standing stones located in a field on the coastal plain of west Cumbria, near Kirksanton village.
	Lanercost Priory	54.9662°N 2.6949°W	late 12th century	Founded by Augustinian cannons. What remains of the priory are the ruins of the chancel and transepts, and the 13th-century nave which was converted into a parish church.
	Long Meg and Her Daughters	54.72794°N 2.66765°W	Neolithic or Bronze Age era	A stone circle, a linear earthwork lying west of the stone circle, and a Neolithic enclosure to the north.
	Ravenglass Roman Bath House	54.3507°N 3.4042°W	2nd century AD	A ruined ancient Roman bath house located northeast to the Roman fort.
	Stott Park Bobbin Mill	54.2855°N 2.9659°W	1835	A very large working mill which has produced millions of wooden bobbins essential to the Lancashire weaving and spinning industry.

== See also ==
- Grade I listed buildings in Cumbria
- List of scheduled monuments in the United Kingdom
