= Scheduled monuments in Hertfordshire =

List of scheduled monuments in the county of Hertfordshire, England

There are 225 scheduled monuments in the county of Hertfordshire, England. These protected sites date from the Neolithic period and include barrows, ruined abbeys, castles, and Iron Age hill forts. In the United Kingdom, the scheduling of monuments was first initiated to ensure the preservation of "nationally important" archaeological sites or historic buildings. Protection is given to scheduled monuments under the Ancient Monuments and Archaeological Areas Act 1979.

== Notable scheduled monuments in Hertfordshire ==
Image	Name	Location	Date	Notes
	St Albans Cathedral	51°45′02″N 0°20′32″W	1077 AD	The cathedral is known for having the longest nave in England.
	Old Gorhambury House	51°45′25″N 0°23′36″W	Built 1563–1568	Ruined 16th century mansion. An excellent example of an Elizabethan prodigy house.
	Rye House, Hertfordshire	51.7711°N 0.007°E	c 1443 AD	The gatehouse of a former fortified manor house. The house was the setting of the Rye House Plot.
	Welwyn Roman Baths	51.8277°N 0.2081°W	3rd century AD	Roman bath complex within the Dicket Mead Roman villa.
	Verulamium	51.7500°N 0.3539°W	1st century AD	The ruins of a Romano-British city. Most of the city has not been excavated.
	Waytemore Castle	51.871934°N 0.162959°E	late 11th century	The monument contains mostly earthenworks of what was originally a Norman motte-and-bailey castle.

== See also ==
- The Hundred Parishes
- List of scheduled monuments in the United Kingdom
