= Scheduled monuments in East Sussex =

List of protected ancient monuments in East Sussex, England

There are 931 scheduled monuments in the county of East Sussex, England. These protected sites date from the Neolithic period and include barrows, moated sites, ruined abbeys, Iron Age hillforts, and a hill figure. In the United Kingdom, the scheduling of monuments was first initiated to ensure the preservation of "nationally important" archaeological sites or historic buildings. Protection is given to scheduled monuments under the Ancient Monuments and Archaeological Areas Act 1979.

== Notable scheduled monuments in East Sussex ==
Image	Name	Location	Date	Notes
	Battle Abbey	50.91432°N 0.48683°E	1094	The ruined Benedictine abbey was built on the site of the Battle of Hastings.
	Bodiam Castle	51.0023°N 0.5435°E	14th century	Ruined quadrangular castle with the original moat, towers and portcullis.
	Greyfriars, Winchelsea	50.9218°N 0.7103°E	1242 AD	The monument consists of a ruined monastery of the Order of Friars Minor. It is considered the best example of Franciscan architecture in England.
	Hollingbury Castle	50°51′19″N 0°7′23″W	8th to 5th centuries BC	The site contains an Iron Age hillfort and three Bronze Age bowl barrows.
	Lewes Castle	50°52′22″N 0°00′27″E	1066 AD	The monument is a motte and bailey castle with the unusual feature of two mottes.
	Long Man of Wilmington	50°48′36″N 0°11′17″E	Unknown	The monument is the largest representation of the human form in Europe.
	Pevensey Castle	50.8188°N 0.3342°E	Fort: 3rd century AD, Castle 1066 AD	The monument includes a Roman Saxon Shore fort, an 11th-century enclosure castle, and the remains of later defenses.
	Portslade Manor	50.8432°N 0.2181°W	12th century	One of a small number of remaining Norman manor houses in England. In 1807, the fortified manor was abandoned when a new manor house was built and it was later used as an almshouse for the poor.
	Whitehawk Camp	50°49′39″N 0°6′43″W	3700 BC to 3500 BC	An early Neolithic causewayed enclosure which originally consisted of a circular area surrounded by concentric rings of banks and ditches. These monuments were probably used for many functions, including defense, rituals and funerary purposes.
	Wilmington Priory	50.8173°N 0.1903°E	11th century	The Benedictine Priory was founded before 1243 on the site of an earlier settlement of the Grestain Abbey in Normandy, France.

== See also ==
- Grade I listed buildings in East Sussex
- List of scheduled monuments in the United Kingdom
