= Scheduled monuments in Kent =

List of scheduled monuments in the county of Kent, England

There are 689 scheduled monuments in the county of Kent, England. These protected sites date in some cases from the Neolithic period, and include barrows, artillery forts, ruined abbeys, castles, and Iron Age hill forts. In the United Kingdom, the scheduling of monuments was first initiated to ensure the preservation of "nationally important" archaeological sites and historic buildings. Protection is given to scheduled monuments under the Ancient Monuments and Archaeological Areas Act 1979.

== Notable scheduled monuments in Kent ==
This is a partial list of scheduled monuments in Kent.

Image	Name	Location	Date	Notes
	Canterbury Castle	51.275686°N 1.074618°E	11th century	One of the three original royal castles of Kent, all built soon after the Battle of Hastings.
	Chestnuts Long Barrow	51°18′28″N 0°22′10″E	Early Neolithic era	Chambered long barrow. Belongs to the group of burial tombs known as the Medway Megaliths.
	Coldrum Long Barrow	51.3216°N 0.3728°E	Early Neolithic era	Also known as the "Coldrum Stones". Belongs to the group of burial tombs known as the Medway Megaliths.
	Dover Castle	51.1297°N 1.3214°E	11th century	One of the three original royal castles of Kent. Considered the most significant defensive castle in the history of England.
	Eynsford Castle	51.370556°N 0.213333°E	11th century AD	Ruined medieval fortification. An early Norman castle.
	Greyfriars, Canterbury	51°16′44″N 1°04′37″E	Early 13th century	The first Franciscan friary in England.
	Lower Mill, Woodchurch	51°5′0″N 0°46′22″E	1820	A surviving early 19th century smock mill, which is a type of windmill that takes its name from its similarity to smocks worn by farmers during that era.
	Oldbury Camp	51°17′N 0°16′E	1st century BC	The largest Iron Age hill fort in south-eastern England.
	Richborough Castle	51.294°N 1.332°E	1st century AD	Roman Saxon Shore fort.
	Rochester Castle	51°23′24″N 0°30′05″E	1087–1089 AD	One of the three original royal castles of Kent. The 12th-century keep is one of the best preserved in England or France.
	St Augustine's Abbey	51°16′44.0″N 1°5′13.5″E	598 AD	Benedictine monastery founded by St Augustine. Originally dedicated to St Peter and St Paul. Renamed after Augustine's death.
	St Mary's Church, Eastwell	51.1900°N 0.8745°E	15th century	Ruined parish church. It is also a designated Grade II listed building.
	Upnor Castle	51°24′25″N 0°31′38″E	1559–1567	Rare example of an Elizabethan artillery fort.

== See also ==
- Grade I listed buildings in Kent
- List of scheduled monuments in the United Kingdom
