= Scheduled monuments in Essex =

List of protected ancient monuments in the county of Essex, England

There are 425 scheduled monuments in the county of Essex, England. These protected sites date from the Neolithic period in some cases and include barrows, moated sites, ruined abbeys, castles, and a windmill. In the United Kingdom, the scheduling of monuments was first initiated to ensure the preservation of "nationally important" archaeological sites or historic buildings. Protection given to scheduled monuments under the Ancient Monuments and Archaeological Areas Act 1979.

== Notable scheduled monuments in Essex ==
| Image | Name | Location | Date | Notes |
|---|---|---|---|---|
| | Colchester Castle | 51.890589°N 0.903047°E | 1st century AD – 11th century AD | The monument includes a Roman fort, the remains of a Roman settlement, a classical temple, a late Anglo-Saxon chapel and a Norman castle. |
| | Hadleigh Castle | 51.5444°N 0.6090°E | After 1215 AD | This is the only surviving example of an enclosure castle in Essex and an associated dam and watermill. |
| | Hedingham Castle | 51°59′33″N 0°36′04″E | Late 11th-early 12th century | A ringwork castle and tower-keep. It is the best example of a Norman tower-keep in England. |
| | The Leper Hospital of St Giles | 51.726898°N 0.667409°E | Late 12th century | St Giles is the only surviving leper hospital in Essex. The above ground ruins are most likely the hospital chapel. |
| | St Botolph's Priory | 51.88749°N 0.90429°E | 1093 AD | St Botolph's was the first Augustinian priory in England. It is a notable example of early Norman architecture. |
| | St John's Abbey, Colchester | 51°53′7.96″N 0°54′5.67″E | 1095 AD | The above-ground remains of the Benedictine abbey include sections of the precinct wall and the abbey gatehouse. The gatehouse was built around 1400. |
| | Stansted Mountfitchet Windmill | 51°54′04″N 0°11′38″E | 1787 AD | A 5-storey brick tower windmill built in 1787. It is not currently in service, but the windmill's cap and sails are functioning and it has all the original machinery. |
| | St Peter's Church, Wickham Bishops | 51.7698°N 0.6434°E | 11th century | A redundant church in the village of Wickham Bishops. The building was abandoned after 1850 when a new church was built. |
| | Stansted Mountfitchet Castle | 51.90261°N 0.20192°E | After 1096 AD | A Norman ringwork and bailey fortification. The site is currently in use as a Living history museum. |

== See also ==
- Grade I listed buildings in Essex
- List of scheduled monuments in the United Kingdom
