= Scheduled monuments in Warwickshire =

List of scheduled monuments in the county of Warwickshire, England

There are 199 scheduled monuments in the county of Warwickshire, England. These protected sites date in some cases from the Neolithic period, and include medieval moated sites, ruined abbeys, castles, and medieval bridges. In the United Kingdom, the scheduling of monuments was first initiated to ensure the preservation of "nationally important" archaeological sites and historic buildings. Protection is given to scheduled monuments under the Ancient Monuments and Archaeological Areas Act 1979.

== Notable scheduled monuments in Warwickshire ==
This is a partial list of scheduled monuments in Warwickshire.

Image	Name	Location	Date	Notes
	Alvecote Priory	52.63408°N 1.63056°W	1159 AD	Ruined Benedictine Priory.
	Astley Castle	52.5024°N 1.5424°W	16th century	Ruined fortified manor house. The house was a Parliamentary stronghold during the English Civil War.
	Baddesley Clinton	52.34032°N 1.70934°W	13th century	The moated manor house was a sanctuary for persecuted Catholics in the 1590s, who were hidden in secret chambers in the house.
	Bidford Bridge	52.1639°N 1.8566°W	Early 15th century	The packhorse bridge was partially destroyed in 1644 by the army of Charles I to protect his retreat from Worcester to Oxford.
	Maxstoke Priory	52.47808°N 1.65624°W	Early 14th century	A good example of a late-medieval Augustinian priory.
	Tripontium	52.409152°N 1.212683°W	47 AD	Small Roman town that was established in the 1st century AD and continued until the 4th century AD.
	Warwick Castle	52°16′46″N 01°35′05″W	1068 AD	Built by William the Conqueror. One of the best known castles of the Hundred Years War. Excellent example of a medieval castle.

== See also ==
- Grade I listed buildings in Warwickshire
- List of scheduled monuments in the United Kingdom
