= Scheduled monuments in Dorset =

List of protected ancient monuments in Dorset, England

There are more than 1000 scheduled monuments in the county of Dorset, in South West England. These protected sites date from the Neolithic period and include barrows, stone circles, hill figures, ancient Roman sites, castle ruins, and medieval abbeys. In the United Kingdom, the scheduling of monuments was first initiated to ensure the preservation of "nationally important" archaeological sites or historic buildings. Protection is given to scheduled monuments under the Ancient Monuments and Archaeological Areas Act 1979.

== Notable scheduled monuments in Dorset ==
Image	Name	Location	Date	Notes
	Abbotsbury Abbey	Abbotsbury	11th century	Benedictine Monastery dedicated to St Peter.y
	Cerne Abbas Giant	Cerne Abbas	Unknown	55 metres (180 ft) high Hill figure of a standing, nude man holding a club.
	Corfe Castle	Corfe Castle	11th century	Ruined castle originally built by William the Conqueror
	Dorset Cursus	Cranborne Chase	3300 BCE	Neolithic cursus. This may be Britain's largest Neolithic site. It spans six miles (10km) through the chalk downs of Cranborne Chase.
	Kingston Russell Stone Circle	Between Abbotsbury and Littlebredy	3300—900 BCE.	This stone circle is the largest of those in Dorset, measuring 24 by 27 m (79 feet by 89 feet) in diameter and containing eighteen sarsen stones.
	Lulworth Castle	Cranborne Chase	Early 17th century	Early 17th century hunting lodge built in the style of a revival fortified castle.
	Maiden Castle, Dorset	Dorchester	800 BCE – 43 AD	Maiden Castle is one of the largest Iron Age hillforts in Britain.
	Nine Stones, Winterbourne Abbas	Winterbourne Abbas	3300 BCE – 900 BCE	Bronze Age stone circle.
	St Martin's Church, Wareham	Wareham	7th century	Anglo-Saxon Church built by St Aldhelm. It is the oldest surviving church in Dorset.

== See also ==
- List of scheduled monuments
- List of World Heritage Sites in the United Kingdom
