= Scheduled monuments in Bristol =

List of protected ancient monuments in Bristol, England

There are 165 scheduled monuments in Bristol, England. These protected sites date from the Neolithic period in some cases and include barrows, a historic shipyard, ancient Roman sites, castle ruins, a Jewish burial structure, bridges, and lighthouses. In the United Kingdom, the scheduling of monuments was first initiated to ensure the preservation of "nationally important" archaeological sites or historic buildings. Protection is given to scheduled monuments under the Ancient Monuments and Archaeological Areas Act 1979.

== Notable scheduled monuments in Bristol ==
Image	Name	Location	Date	Notes
	Blaise Castle Estate	Near Henbury in Bristol	18th century	The estate includes Blaise Castle House, a Grade II* listed 18th-century mansion house and Blaise Castle, a folly built in 1766.
	Bristol Castle vaulted chambers	Bristol	11th century	Built during the reign of William the Conqueror, it was an important royal castle that was the setting of several executions.
	Bristol High Cross	Bristol	14th century	A market cross erected in 1373 in the centre of Bristol. It was built in Decorated Gothic style on the site of an earlier Anglo-Saxon cross,
	Fairbairn steam crane	Bristol	1875	The Fairbairn type jib crane was designed and patented by Sir William Fairbairn in 1850. This type of crane bettered existing designs in that the projecting arm allowed the crane operator to reach further into the hold of a ship and it was light in weight compared to the weight it could lift.
	Bet tohorah at Jacob's Wells Road	Cliftonwood, Bristol	12th to 13th century AD	Early medieval structure used as a cleansing house in Jewish burial ceremonies. Generally associated with Jewish burial grounds.
	Kings Weston Roman Villa	Lawrence Weston, Bristol	late 3rd century AD	Roman villa uncovered during the construction of the Lawrence Weston housing estate in 1947.
	The Old Lighthouse, Lundy	Lundy island, Bristol Channel	1819	Known as "Old Light". An abandoned lighthouse on the highest point of Lundy, it is the oldest of the three Lundy lighthouses. It includes the lightkeeper's house and a small complex of buildings within a walled enclosure.
	St Mary le Port Church, Bristol	Bristol	Early Medieval era	St Mary's was established in the Anglo-Saxon period and later rebuilt between the 11th and 16th centuries. The church was bombed during a bombing raid in November 1940.
	Quakers Friars	Broadmead, Bristol	1227 AD	The friends meeting house was built in 1747–1749 on the site of a Dominican friary, Blackfriars, which was established in the early 13th century.
	Temple Church, Bristol	Redcliffe, Bristol	14th century AD	Ruined 14th century church built on the site of a previous circular church of the Knights Templar. Bombed and mostly destroyed during the Second World War.
	Underfall Yard, Bristol Docks	Spike Island, Bristol	1809 AD	A historic shipyard serving Bristol Harbour. It was generally referred to as "The Underfalls."

== See also ==
- Grade I listed buildings in Bristol
- History of Bristol
- List of scheduled monuments
