= The Leper Hospital of St Giles =

Ruined medieval hospital chapel in Maldon, Essex

Coordinates: 51.726898°N 0.667409°E

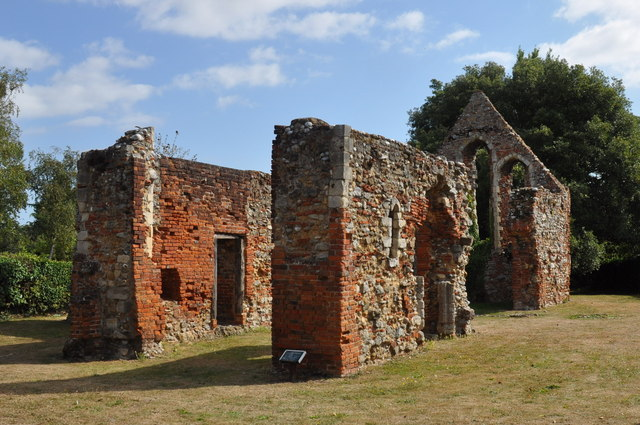
Ruins of St Giles

The Leper Hospital of St Giles is a ruined medieval hospital located in the town of Maldon in Essex, England. Originally established to treat and shelter the town's lepers, it is one of very few surviving medieval hospitals in England. After the dissolution, the building was later used as a barn. The site was designated a scheduled monument in 1923.

== Description ==
The ruined medieval building is one of few surviving medieval hospitals in England. The surviving structure, located on Spital Road in the town of Maldon in Essex, is believed to be the hospital's chapel. Most of the chapel's above-ground remains date to the end of the 12th century and include the north chancel wall, east and west walls of the north transept and the east, west and south walls of the south transept. The building previously included a western annexe where the living spaces or hall were located. The chapel's remains are a mix of flint rubble and Roman brickwork, and survive to a height of the building's original eaves. Repairs were made to the chapel in the 16th century with red brick and limestone ashlar dressings.

== History ==
Medieval hospitals were originally established in England by Anglo-Norman bishops and queens during the 11th century. The hospitals dispensed both spiritual and medical care to the aged, poor and infirm. By the mid 16th century there were approximately 800 hospitals throughout England.

St Giles' Hospital was originally built as a hospital chapel in the late 12th century. Records from 1402 state that the Hospital of St Giles was founded by one of the Kings of England. Its initial objective was to house and provide for the maintenance of a chaplain to celebrate daily mass, and to provide a sanctuary for the town's lepers. The chapel was established as a dependence of the Augustinian Bicknacre Priory.

After the number of people afflicted with leprosy declined during the 13th and 14th centuries, St Giles' was converted to a hospital for the poor, aged and infirm. In 1401, the hospital became a free chapel, no longer under the jurisdiction of the parish priest. In 1481, the management of the hospital was transferred to Beeleigh Abbey in Maldon. The hospital closed after 1538, after the dissolution of the abbey. By 1763, the hospital was being used as a barn. Records show that in 1899, the barn was in ruins. The site was designated a scheduled monument in 1923.

== See also ==
- Scheduled monuments in Essex
- Hospital of St John the Baptist, High Wycombe
