= Albrighton Moat =

Historic site in Shropshire, England

Coordinates: 52.64248°N 2.27627°W

Albrighton Moat is a Scheduled Monument in the village of Donington, Shropshire. The moat surrounds a relatively small platform of earth (900 square metres (9,700 sq ft)), which supported a, now demolished, manor house sometime in the 13th or 14th century.

A geophysical survey in November 1990 revealed the remains of the main building and porch, facing towards a causeway that would have linked the buildings to the rest of the site. Excavations also undertaken at that time suggest the moat was filled in, partially by natural silting, and partly by modern deposits of brick rubble and refuse. Field drains had also been cut, to drain the moat into the stream which runs along the eastern edge of the site.

William Hardwicke, the Registrar of Bridgnorth in 1801, believed this to be the site of the original house of the Lords of Donington, which was described as having been 'singularly seated in the centre of a pasture field called Moat Bank; north east of Donington church, a quarter of a mile away, and adjoining to the east a small stream, which separates it from the sub-feudal manor of Humphryston’. This accurately describes the position of Albrighton Moat, in relation to the medieval church of St Cuthbert at Donington, ref Robinson and being only 340 metres (1,120 ft) from the Grade II listed Humphreston Hall.

The site was granted Scheduled Monument status on 15 July 1975. Historic England describe it as "a well-preserved example of this class of monument" and note that in its present state as a public amenity it acts as "a significant educational resource".

== Modern development and current use ==
Around 1988, plans began to excavate the moat completely, and create an angling facility for disabled people. This was greatly helped by the BBC show Challenge Anneka, which helped fill the moat with water and stock the fish. The project was featured in series 4, episode 4, first aired October 1992. A 25-year celebration was held at the centre in 2017, with Anneka Rice attending again.

Now known as the Albrighton Trust Moat and Gardens, the site provides supported angling, woodworking and gardening experiences for young people with disabilities. The gardens are open to the public on weekdays, and regular school visits and experience days make it an amenity for children in the local area.

== See also ==
- Scheduled monuments in Shropshire

== Bibliography ==
- Hughes, E. Gwilym (1990). Further Excavations at Albrighton Moat, Shropshire 1990 (PDF) (Report). Birmingham University Field Archaeology Unit.
- Robinson, D.H. The Wandering Worfe 1980 (Report). ISBN 0905184068.
