= Scheduled monuments in Oxfordshire =

List of scheduled monuments in the county of Oxfordshire, England

There are 379 scheduled monuments in the county of Oxfordshire, England. These protected sites date in some cases from the Neolithic period, and include stone circles, a medieval tithe barn, ruined abbeys, castles, and Roman villas. In the United Kingdom, the scheduling of monuments was first initiated to ensure the preservation of "nationally important" archaeological sites and historic buildings. Protection is given to scheduled monuments under the Ancient Monuments and Archaeological Areas Act 1979.

== Notable scheduled monuments in Oxfordshire ==
This is a partial list of scheduled monuments in Oxfordshire.

Image	Name	Location	Date	Notes
	Carfax Conduit	51.67531°N 1.22446°W	1610 AD	Stone water conduit that supplied the city of Oxford with water until 1787.
	Devil's Quoits	51.7400°N 1.4059°W	4000–5000 BC	The monument is an important class II circle henge monument of the Late Neolithic era.
	Great Coxwell Barn	51.64434°N 1.61279°W	1292 AD	notes
	North Leigh Roman Villa	51.8362°N 1.4245°W	c. 100 AD	Large courtyard-style Roman villa.
	Oxford Castle	51.7517°N 1.2632°W	1071 AD	Ruined medieval castle. Mostly destroyed during the English Civil War.
	Rollright Stones	51°58′32″N 1°34′15″W	3800–3500 BC	A group of Neolithic and Bronze Age stone monuments.
	Uffington White Horse	51.57830°N 1.56671°W	1380–550 BC	Carved into the chalk hillside, the monument is the oldest prehistoric hill figure in Britain.
	Wayland's Smithy	51°34′00″N 1°35′46″W	c. 3600 BC	A Cotswold-Severn style chambered long barrow of the Early Neolithic era.

== See also ==
- Grade I listed buildings in Oxfordshire
- List of scheduled monuments in the United Kingdom
