= Scheduled monuments in Hampshire =

List of scheduled monuments in the county of Hampshire, England

There are 735 scheduled monuments in the county of Hampshire, England. These protected sites date from the Neolithic period and include barrows, artillery forts, ruined abbeys, castles, and Iron Age hill forts. In the United Kingdom, the scheduling of monuments was first initiated to ensure the preservation of "nationally important" archaeological sites or historic buildings. Protection is given to scheduled monuments under the Ancient Monuments and Archaeological Areas Act 1979.

== Notable scheduled monuments in Hampshire ==
Image	Name	Location	Date	Notes
	Bargate	50°54′10″N 1°24′15″W	c 1180 AD	Norman gatehouse, part of the Southampton town walls.
	Bishop's Waltham Palace	50.95343°N 1.21409°W	1135 AD	A moated Bishop's Palace ruin dating from the Norman Conquest.
	Buckland Rings	50.77045°N 1.55464°W	Iron Age	The site of an Iron Age hill fort located in Lymington, Hampshire.
	Calshot Castle	50°49′12″N 1°18′27″W	1540 AD	This artillery fort was constructed by Henry VIII to defend Southampton.
	Flowerdown Barrows	51°05′07″N 1°20′46″W	Bronze Age	The monumens consists of three Bronze Age burial mounds within a large cemetery, two bowl barrows and a well-preserved disc barrow.
	King John's Palace, Southampton	50.89967°N 1.40665°W	Late 12th century	A ruined Norman merchant's house in Southampton.
	Netley Abbey	50.87865°N 1.35727°W	1239 AD	The ruined abbey is the best surviving example of a Cistercian monastery in southern England.
	Portchester Castle	50.836546°N 1.113034°W	Late 11th century	A medieval fortress built within the walls of the Roman Saxon Shore fort of Portus Adurni. It was also a prisoner of war camp during the Napoleonic Wars.
	Spitbank Fort	50.77068°N 1.09895°W	1867–1878	A military sea fort located in the Solent, near Portsmouth.
	Twyford Waterworks	51.02132°N 1.29915°W	1898	The monument consists of a late 19th-century pumping station and waterworks used to supply water to Winchester and Southampton.

== See also ==
- Grade I listed buildings in Hampshire
- List of scheduled monuments in the United Kingdom
