= Scheduled monuments in Shropshire =

List of scheduled monuments in the county of Shropshire, England

There are 499 scheduled monuments in the county of Shropshire, England. These protected sites date in some cases from the Neolithic period, and include stone circles, ruined abbeys, castles, Iron Age hillforts and Roman villas. In the United Kingdom, the scheduling of monuments was first initiated to ensure the preservation of "nationally important" archaeological sites and historic buildings. Protection is given to scheduled monuments under the Ancient Monuments and Archaeological Areas Act 1979.

== Notable scheduled monuments in Shropshire ==
This is a partial list of scheduled monuments in Shropshire.

Image	Name	Location	Date	Notes
	Albrighton Moat	52.64248°N 2.27627°W	13th or 14th century	Moated site preserving remains of an early medieval building
	Bury Walls	52°50′34″N 2°37′43″W	Iron Age	Iron Age hillfort
	Haughmond Abbey	52.73224°N 2.68033°W	Early 12th century	Ruined Augustinian monastery.
	The Iron Bridge	52.62735°N 2.48550°W	1777	The first major cast iron bridge in the world; it spans the River Severn.
	Ludlow Castle	52.3672°N 2.7230°W	1066–1085	Ruined medieval castle. Henry VII's first son, Prince Arthur, died at Ludlow in 1502.
	Shrewsbury Abbey	52°42′27″N 2°44′39″W	1083	Founded as a Benedictine monastery. Part of the abbey has continued to be used as a parish church.
	Stokesay Castle	52.4303°N 2.8313°W	late 13th century	An excellent example of a late medieval fortified manor houses.
	Wenlock Priory	52.59748°N 2.55532°W	1079–1082	Ruined 12th-century monastery.

== See also ==
- Grade I listed buildings in Shropshire
- List of scheduled monuments in the United Kingdom
