= Scheduled monuments in Suffolk =

List of scheduled monuments in the county of Suffolk, England

There are 402 scheduled monuments in the county of Suffolk, England. These protected sites date in some cases from the Neolithic period, and include stone circles, ruined abbeys, castles, an Anglo-Saxon ship burial windmills. In the United Kingdom, the scheduling of monuments was first initiated to ensure the preservation of "nationally important" archaeological sites and historic buildings. Protection is given to scheduled monuments under the Ancient Monuments and Archaeological Areas Act 1979.

== Notable scheduled monuments in Suffolk ==
This is a partial list of scheduled monuments in Suffolk.

| Image | Name | Location | Date | Notes |
|---|---|---|---|---|
| | Blythburgh Priory | 52.3217°N 1.5965°E | 1147 AD | Ruined Augustinian priory |
| | Bury St Edmunds Abbey | 52.2441°N 0.7192°E | 11th century AD | One of the wealthiest Benedictine monasteries in Britain. |
| | Clare Castle | 52.0768°N 0.5829°E | 1066 AD | Historic medieval motte-and-bailey castle. |
| | Orford Castle | 52.0936°N 1.5300°E | 1165 – 1173 AD | Ruined medieval castle with an excellent surviving keep. |
| | St James' Chapel, Lindsey | 52.06267°N 0.88383°E | 1250 AD | Built in the 13th century to serve the castle of Lindsey. Later converted to a barn. |
| | Saxtead Green Windmill | 52.2318°N 1.2984°E | 1796 | Restored 18th century corn mill with three-storey round house. |
| | Sutton Hoo | 52.089°N 1.338°E | 6th-7th centuries AD | Prehistoric settlement and site of legendary Anglo-Saxon ship burial. |
| | Upthorpe Mill, Stanton | 52°19′20″N 0°53′35″E | 1751 | Restored open trestle post mill. Moved to current site in 1818. |

== See also ==
- Grade I listed buildings in Suffolk
- List of scheduled monuments in the United Kingdom
