= Scheduled monuments in North Yorkshire =

List of scheduled monuments in the county of North Yorkshire, England

There are 2390 scheduled monuments in the county of North Yorkshire, England. These protected sites date in some cases from the Neolithic period, and include medieval moated sites, ruined abbeys, castles, and Neolithic monuments. In the United Kingdom, the scheduling of monuments was first initiated to ensure the preservation of "nationally important" archaeological sites and historic buildings. Protection is given to scheduled monuments under the Ancient Monuments and Archaeological Areas Act 1979.

== Notable scheduled monuments in North Yorkshire ==
This is a partial list of scheduled monuments in North Yorkshire.

Image	Name	Location	Date	Notes
	Bolton Castle	54.321932°N 1.948106°W	Late 14th century	Mary, Queen of Scots was held prisoner at Bolton for six months.
	Coverham Abbey	54.27256°N 1.84071°W	1190 AD	A Premonstratensian monastery founded by Helewisia, daughter of Ranulf de Glanville.
	Devil's Arrows	54°5′34.53″N 1°24′13.25″W	Late Neolithic era	Four Neolithic Standing Stones.
	Fountains Abbey	54°6′35″N 1°34′53″W	1132 AD	The largest and best preserved ruined monastery in England.
	Jubilee Memorial, Harrogate	53.9923°N 1.5381°W	1887 AD	The memorial was built to commemorate the 1887 golden jubilee of Queen Victoria.
	Markenfield Hall	54.10161°N 1.55104°W	1310 AD	An early 14th-century moated manor house.
	Richmond Castle	54.4017°N 1.7376°W	Late 11th century	An excellent example of a Norman castle in Britain.
	Rievaulx Abbey	54°15′27″N 1°7′0″W	1132 AD	The Abbey was the first Cistercian monastery to be established in the north of England.
	Snape Castle	54.254°N 1.599°W	1430 AD	Self-fortified manor house of Cecily Neville, mother of Edward IV and Richard III. Katherine Parr lived in the castle from 1536 to 1537. She, along with her two step-children were taken as hostages, when the castle was attacked in 1537.
	Thornborough Henges	54°12′36″N 1°33′50″W	Late Neolithic era	This late Neolithic and early Bronze Age complex consists of three circular henges, a cursus, burial grounds and prehistoric settlements.
	Whitby Abbey	54.4883°N 0.6075°W	657 AD	One of the earliest monasteries to be established in Northern England, Whitby was a double monastery of both monks and nuns.
	York Minster	53°57′43″N 1°4′55″W	627 AD	The site includes a section of the Roman legionary fortress at Eboracum, the Anglian and early Norman minsters, and the Anglian and medieval churches of the Alma Sophia, St Sepulchre and St Mary ad Valvas.

== See also ==
- Grade I listed buildings in North Yorkshire
- Scheduled monuments in the City of York
- List of scheduled monuments in the United Kingdom
