= Scheduled monuments in Cambridgeshire =

List of protected ancient monuments in Cambridgeshire, England

There are 287 scheduled monuments in the county of Cambridgeshire in the East of England. These protected sites date from the Neolithic period in some cases and include barrows, churches, castle earthworks, Roman roads, moated sites and medieval priories. In the United Kingdom, the scheduling of monuments was first initiated to ensure the preservation of "nationally important" archaeological sites or historic buildings. Protection is given to scheduled monuments under the Ancient Monuments and Archaeological Areas Act 1979.

== Notable scheduled monuments in Cambridgeshire ==
Image	Name	Location	Date	Notes
	Bourn Windmill	Bourn	16th century	It is one of 50 surviving post mills (an early type of European windmill) in the UK.
	Cambridge Castle	Cambridge	11th century	Norman castle built in 1068 to control the critically important road to the north of England, the castle played important part in the civil wars of the Anarchy, the First and Second Barons' Wars.
	Cambridge Museum of Technology	Cambridge	late 19th century	Built in 1894, the original building held a combined sewage pumping and waste destructor station.
	Denny Abbey	Waterbeach	12th century	Three different religious orders inhabited the abbey. It is unique in being the only property in England transferred directly from the Benedictines to the Knights Templars.
	Duxford Chapel	Situated between Duxford and Whittlesford	14th century	This late medieval chapel, founded by William de Colville, was once part of the Hospital of St. John.
	Hobson's Conduit	Trumpington to Cambridge	1610–1614 AD	A watercourse that was built in the early 17th century to bring fresh water into the city of Cambridge from springs at Nine Wells, near the village of Great Shelford.
	Isleham Priory Church	Isleham	1100 AD	The Priory of St Margaret of Antioch was a Benedictine alien priory. The building is an excellent example of an early 12th century Norman church.
	Norman Cross Prison	south of Peterborough	18th century	This is the site of the world's first commissioned prisoner-of-war camp to hold prisoners of war from France and its allies during the French Revolutionary Wars and Napoleonic Wars.
	Old Bridge, Huntingdon	Huntingdon	1332 AD	An excellent example of a medieval stone bridge. Lies over the River Great Ouse, connecting Huntingdon to Godmanchester.
	Ramsey Abbey	Ramsey	969 AD	Ruins of a 10th century Benedictine abbey with a well-preserved gatehouse.
	Stonea Camp	Stonea	500 BC	An Iron Age hill fort. It is one is one of three surviving Iron Age hillforts in Cambridgeshire.

== See also ==
- List of scheduled monuments
- List of World Heritage Sites in the United Kingdom
