= Scheduled monuments in Gloucestershire =

List of scheduled monuments in the county of Gloucestershire, England

There are 563 scheduled monuments in the county of Gloucestershire, England. These protected sites date from the Neolithic period in some cases and include barrows, moated sites, ruined abbeys, castles, Roman villas and tithe barns. In the United Kingdom, the scheduling of monuments was first initiated to ensure the preservation of "nationally important" archaeological sites or historic buildings. Protection is given to scheduled monuments under the Ancient Monuments and Archaeological Areas Act 1979.

== Notable scheduled monuments in Gloucestershire ==
Image	Name	Location	Date	Notes
	Ashleworth Tithe Barn	51.925185°N 2.265081°W	15th century	The barn was built by the canons of St Augustine's, Bristol.
	Beverston Castle	51.644239°N 2.201553°W	early 13th century	The monument includes a quadrangular castle with medieval, post-medieval and modern features.
	Belas Knap	51°55′38″N 1°58′15″W	3000 BC	A Cotswold-Severn type of long barrow with an unusual false entrance.
	Chedworth Roman Villa	51°49′11″N 1°55′28″W	Early 2nd century AD	One of Roman Britain's largest villas. It includes mosaic floors, two bath-houses and a water shrine.
	Cirencester Amphitheatre	51.7115°N 1.9722°W	Early 2nd century AD	Archaeological evidence suggests the amphitheatre held tiered wooden seats for approximately 8000 people.
	Deerhurst	51.96713°N 2.19222°W	early 9th century	The monument consists of a Saxon and medieval ecclesiastical complex which includes Odda's Chapel, St Mary's Priory Church and associated medieval settlement remains.
	Great Witcombe Roman Villa	51.8267°N 2.1474°W	1st century AD	A Romano-British villa which was built on four terraces. When first excavated in the 19th century, much of the villa remains were found to be very well preserved.
	Hailes Abbey	51.96941°N 1.92783°W	1246 AD	Hailes Abbey was one of the last Cistercian monasteries to be established in England.
	Over Bridge	51°52′28″N 2°16′5″W	1825–1828	A single span stone arch bridge built by Scottish engineer, Thomas Telford. Also known as "Telford's Bridge".
	Uley Long Barrow	51°41′55″N 2°18′21″W	3000 BC	A partially reconstructed Neolithic chambered mound which overlooks the Severn Valley.
	Winchcombe Abbey	51°57′12″N 1°58′1″W	c. 798 AD	Winchcombe Abbey was an important ecclesiastical centre during the Saxon period with extensive land holdings.

== See also ==
- Grade I listed buildings in Gloucestershire
- List of scheduled monuments in the United Kingdom
