= Scheduled monuments in Buckinghamshire =

There are 121 scheduled monuments in the county of Buckinghamshire, in England. These protected sites date from the Neolithic period in some cases and include barrows, moated sites, ruined abbeys, Iron Age hillforts, a medieval hospital and a holy well. In the United Kingdom, the scheduling of monuments was first initiated to ensure the preservation of "nationally important" archaeological sites or historic buildings. Protection is given to scheduled monuments under the Ancient Monuments and Archaeological Areas Act 1979.

Of these 121, there are 49 in the part of the county administered by Milton Keynes City Council: a full list of these is given separately at Scheduled monuments in the City of Milton Keynes. The list below gives the more notable of the 72 monuments located in the part administered by Buckinghamshire Council.

== Notable scheduled monuments in mid- and south Buckinghamshire ==
Image	Name	Location	Date	Notes
	Ascott House	Ascott	16 to 17th centuries	The monument includes the buried and above-ground remains of the 16th/17th century mansion and the formal gardens dating from the 16th to 18th centuries.
	Cholesbury Camp	Cholesbury	Iron Age	A well-preserved multivallate Iron Age hillfort. The monument consists of most of the original earthworks.
	Cymbeline's Castle	Northeast of Great Kimble	11th century	A well-preserved small motte-and-bailey castle. The prominent position of the castle contributed to its important role after the Norman Conquest overseeing critical transportation routes .
	Desborough Castle	High Wycombe	Iron Age	The monument consists of two areas of protection: Desborough Castle, a medieval ringwork locally known as The Roundabout, and the likely remains of a round barrow.
	Hawridge Court ringwork	Bledlow-cum-Saunderton	9th to 12th centuries	Well preserved example of a medieval fortification. The defenses are mostly unaltered, reaching almost their full original height.
	Hospital of St John the Baptist, High Wycombe	High Wycombe	late 12th century	Well-preserved remains of a medieval hospital, which include significant architectural remains of a 12th-century infirmary hall and chapel along with structural remains below the surface.
	Notley Abbey	Long Crendon	12th century	The monument consists of the buried remains of the Augustinian abbey and the nearby 16th century dovecote. The well-preserved dovecote retains many of its original features.
	St Rumbold's Well	Buckingham; 51°59′46″N 0°59′50″W	Early medieval era	Anglo-Saxon holy well dedicated to the infant St Rumbold. In 1623, a rectangular conduit house was built over the top of the well.
	Thornborough Bridge	Thornborough	1400 AD	The only surviving medieval bridge in Buckinghamshire. The bridge crosses the parish boundaries of Thornborough and Buckingham.
	Weston Turville Castle	Weston Turville	Medieval	The motte-and-bailey castle was slighted in the 1170s.
	Whiteleaf Cross	Whiteleaf	Possibly c.500-50 BC	A hill figure in the shape of a cross cut into the chalk on the west facing slope of Whiteleaf Hill near Monks Risborough. The origin of the figure is unknown.

== See also ==
- Grade I listed buildings in Buckinghamshire
- List of scheduled monuments in the United Kingdom
