= Weston Turville Castle =

Castle in England

Coordinates: 51.7861°N 0.7560°W

- The Mount; Weston Molyns
- Location within Buckinghamshire
- Type: Motte-and-bailey castle
- Periods: High Middle Ages
- Location: Weston Turville, Buckinghamshire, UK
- OS grid reference: SP859104

History
- Abandoned: 1173–74

Site notes
- Elevation: 70 m (230 ft)
- Excavation dates: 1985
- Archaeologists: Peter Yeoman

Designations
- Designation: Scheduled monument

Weston Turville Castle is a motte-and-bailey in Buckinghamshire, England. It consists of a mound (a 'motte') with two enclosures (baileys). The castle was built in the 11th or 12th century and first mentioned in 1145. It was held by Geoffrey de Turville in 1173–74 when it was demolished (slighted) on the instructions of Henry II.

After the castle was destroyed a manor house was built in the bailey. The site is protected as a scheduled monument and was partly excavated in 1985.

== History ==
It is uncertain when the castle was built. In 1086, the manor of Weston was held by Roger, tenant of Odo of Bayeux. By the mid-12th century, the manor was in the hands of Geoffrey de Turville. The earliest surviving mention of a castle at Weston Turville is in a rare charter relating to castle guard dated to around 1145, at which point it was under Geoffrey's control. It may have been Geoffrey that instigated the castle's construction or it could have been earlier. Archaeologists found pottery at the castle that dates from the late 11th or early 12th century.

Geoffrey de Turville was loyal to the earl of Leicester; Robert de Beaumont, 3rd Earl of Leicester joined a revolt against Henry II. The revolt was unsuccessful, and this may have led to the demolition (slighting) of Weston Turville Castle in 1173–74 on the orders of Henry II. It was one of at least 20 castles that were demolished on Henry II's orders after the conflict. The historian Norman Pounds suggested that in some cases the demolition was tokenistic and could have been easily repaired, noting the extensive surviving earthworks at Weston Turville.

The archaeologist Peter Yeoman suggested that after the castle was demolished the motte was not reused, but the southern bailey was adapted and a moated manor house built within it. The historian Philip Davis notes that though the castle had been destroyed, the site may have continued as a centre of administration. By 1334, the land was held by John de Moleyns who was granted a licence to crenellate. The present building named Manor House was built in the southern bailey in the 18th century and is a Grade II* listed building.

== Archaeological investigation ==
The castle is protected as a scheduled monument, giving it legal protection from change without consent. In 1985, plans to build a swimming pool in the grounds of Manor House at the base of the motte necessitated a rescue excavation ahead of the proposed development. The dig was led by Peter Yeoman on behalf of the Buckinghamshire County Museum. The excavation lasted for three weeks and consisted of a single 9-metre (30 ft) long and 3-metre (9.8 ft) wide trench cutting across a south-western segment of the ditch around the motte. At the time it was the only motte in Buckinghamshire to have been excavated.

== Layout ==
Weston Turville Castle consists of a mound or (a motte) with two attached enclosures (baileys): one to the south and one to the east. The motte is 6.7 metres (22 ft) tall, and Yeoman suggests that it would have originally been 1 to 2 metres (3 ft 3 in to 6 ft 7 in) taller; its base has a diameter of 59 metres (192 ft). The baileys and motte are all enclosed by ditches, and the ditch around the motte contains a spring. The southern bailey measures 80 by 70 metres (260 by 230 ft) and contains the post-medieval Manor House which was built in the 18th century. The eastern bailey measures 80 by 50 metres (260 by 160 ft).

Stone voussoirs found during the 1985 excavation likely represent a stone-built hall or more likely a chapel that was demolished when the castle was slighted in the 1170s.

== See also ==
- Castles in Great Britain and Ireland
- List of castles in Buckinghamshire
- Scheduled monuments in Buckinghamshire
