= Isleham Priory Church =

Church in Cambridgeshire, England

Coordinates: 52°20′34″N 0°24′35″E

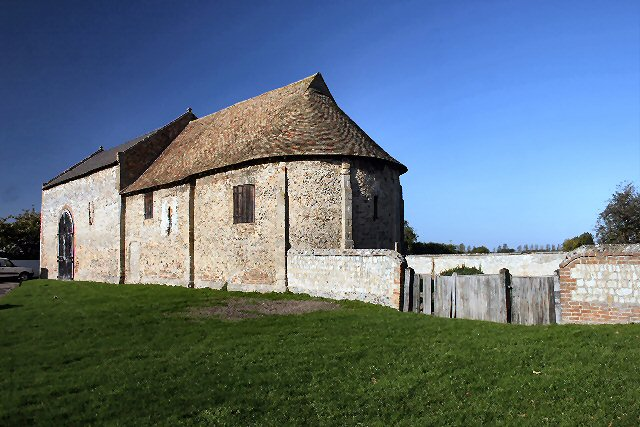
Isleham Priory Church

Isleham Priory Church, located in Isleham, Cambridgeshire, England, is a Benedictine alien priory built around 1100 AD. It is an important example of an early 12th-century Norman church. Despite being converted into a barn after the Reformation, the building remains mostly in its original state. The church is designated a Grade I listed building. The structure and surrounding area are also designated a scheduled Ancient Monument.

== Description ==
The Priory is located north of the village of Isleham in Cambridgeshire, England. The Chapel of St Margaret of Antioch, converted to a barn at a later date, is the only surviving building in the priory complex. The site also includes the buried foundations of other priory buildings, as well as the earthwork remains of a medieval agricultural complex to the north of the church.

The church was built with local clunch rubble and limestone. The building is mostly unaltered since 1100 AD, except for minor repairs done in the 13th and early 14th centuries and after the barn conversion in the 16th or 17th centuries. The area north of the chapel is enclosed by a clunch and brick wall, which was built later than the priory but represents the same boundary that previously enclosed the priory buildings. This enclosed area may also contain the monks' cemetery. The chapel was converted to a barn after the Reformation. In the 16th or early 17th century, a large barn door with a brick round-headed arch replaced an earlier chapel door in the same location. The roofline is believed to have been raised a century later.

The chapel is 30 m (98 ft) in length and consists of a nave and chancel with an apsidal sanctuary at the east end. The nave with two bays measures about 8 m (26 ft) by 14 m (46 ft) and is 6 m (20 ft) in height. The north wall contains two original narrow slit windows, each with rounded heads. The south and west walls also contain the original narrow slit windows. The nave is separated from the chancel by a semicircular arch of two columns. The sanctuary is approximately 6 m (20 ft) in length and is similar in width as the chancel. The apse contains three windows, of which the only original window is on the east wall.

== History ==
The Church of St Margaret of Antioch, the main surviving part of the Priory, was given to the Benedictine Abbey of Saint-Jacut-de-la-Mer in Brittany, France around 1100 by Count Alan of Brittany or his successors, and the Benedictines founded the alien priory on the site. In 1254 the monks moved to the sister cell at Linton in southern Cambridgeshire, although the site seems to have been used as a priory after that time.

Due to the tensions of a French-owned monastery in England during the Hundred Years' War, the lands were seized by King Henry V in 1414 and granted to the Master and Fellows of Pembroke College, Cambridge in 1440. In 1944 Pembroke College placed the Priory in the guardianship of the Ministry of Works. It is a Grade I listed building, and now in the care of English Heritage. The foundations of the conventual buildings and the earthworks in the surrounding land were designated a scheduled monument in 1996.

== See also ==
- Denny Abbey, another Cambridgeshire priory possessed by Pembroke College, Cambridge
- Scheduled monuments in Cambridgeshire
- List of monastic houses in England
