= Chichele College =

Medieval chantry college in Northamptonshire, England

Coordinates: 52.30763°N 0.59295°W

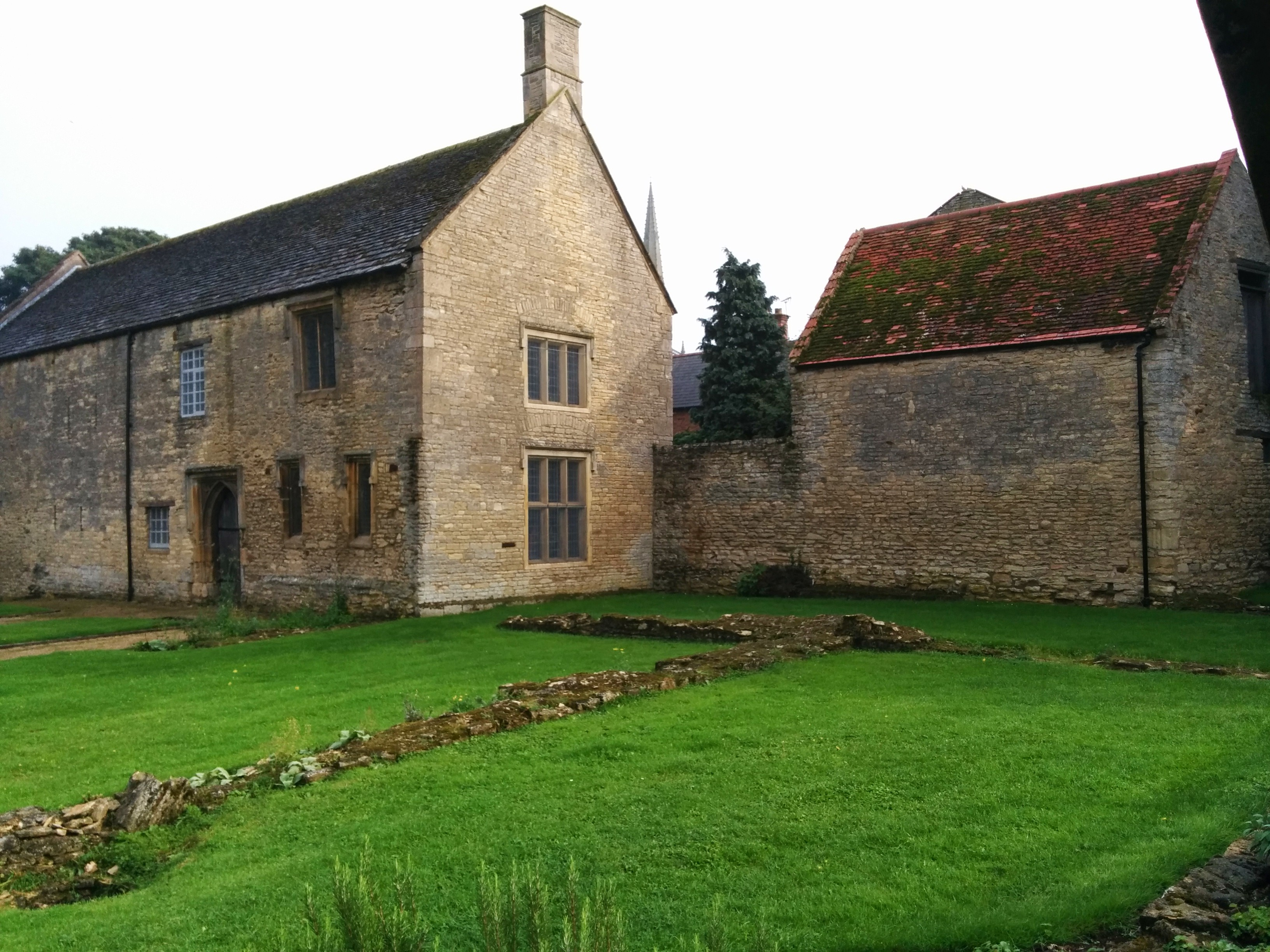
- Surviving buildings of Chichele College
- Type: Chantry college
- Location: Higham Ferrers, Northamptonshire, England
- Founder: Henry Chichele
- Built: 1425
- Original use: Religious college for secular canons
- Current use: Historic site; chapel used for local events

Chichele College is a former medieval chantry college situated in Higham Ferrers, in Northamptonshire, England. Chantry colleges were founded primarily in the 14th and 15th centuries in England. Chicele College was established in the early 15th century by Henry Chichele, Archbishop of Canterbury as a religious learning community for secular canons. The college was seized by Henry VIII in 1542 and many of the buildings were demolished. The remaining buildings were used as an inn during the 18th century and were later converted into farm buildings. The site was designated a scheduled monument in 1981. The surviving structural remains include standing buildings, foundations of walls and buildings, and a rare walled garden which dates to 1425.

== Description ==
The historic site is located in the village of Higham Ferrers, in Northamptonshire, England. The remains of the college are in good condition. The surviving medieval buildings include the gatehouse and chapel, along with a mix of undamaged structures and building ruins. There is also a rare, walled garden, which is dated to 1425. The surviving buildings were built with coursed, roughly dressed limestone and the roofs were constructed with Collyweston slate. The chapel is currently used for local events.

== History ==
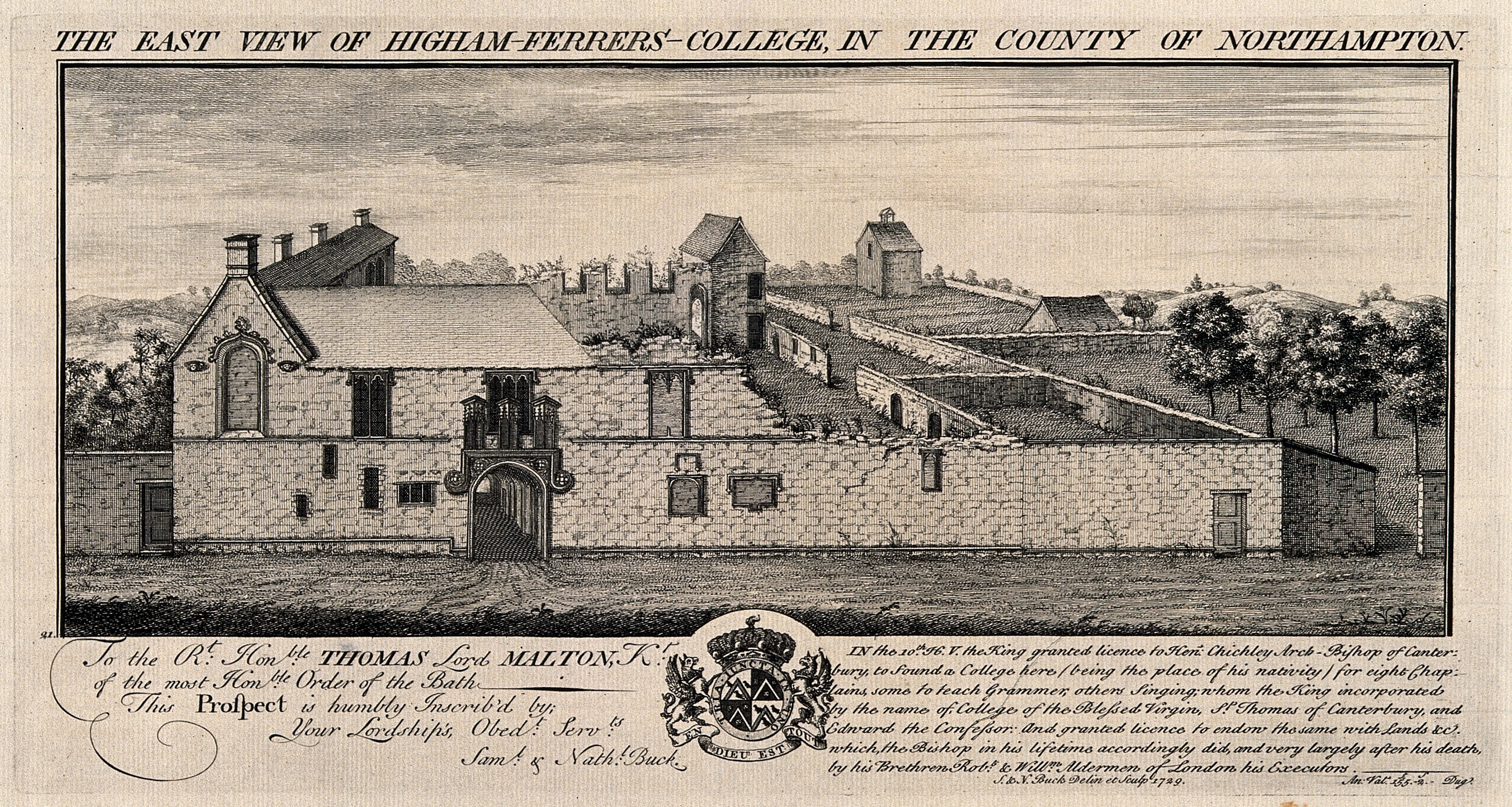
Etching of 1729, by S. and N. Buck.

The earliest chantry colleges in England date to the 10th century, but the majority were established in the 14th and 15th centuries. These early colleges were communities of priests, usually funded by a wealthy patron. Their primary purpose was to offer masses for the souls of the patron and the patron's family. Teaching was also an important function, and many colleges provided housing for the poor and the elderly.

Archbishop Chichele at Higham Ferrers obtained a royal licence for the college in 1422 and the college's foundation ceremony occurred in 1425. The archbishop was born in Higham Ferrers around 1362. Dedicated to the Blessed Virgin, St Thomas of Canterbury and St Edward the Confessor, the community initially included eight secular canons, four clerks and six choristers. The college was closed and surrendered to Henry VIII in 1542. Many of the buildings were destroyed at the time.

Several of the college buildings were later remodelled and used as an inn during the 18th century. During the early 20th century, the surviving buildings were converted to a farm cottage and attached granary. The Ministry of Works took over guardianship of the site in 1948. The farm buildings were demolished and the surviving structures of the college were later restored. The site, designated as a scheduled monument in 1981, includes the standing ruined and buried remains of Chichele College. The ground beneath the Grade II Listed stable building and adjacent wall is also included in the scheduling, but not the above-ground structures.

== See also ==
- Cobham College
- Chantry Chapel of St Mary the Virgin, Wakefield
- Scheduled monuments in Northamptonshire
