= Hawridge Court ringwork =

Medieval fortification in Buckinghamshire, England

Coordinates: 51.7432°N 0.6252°W

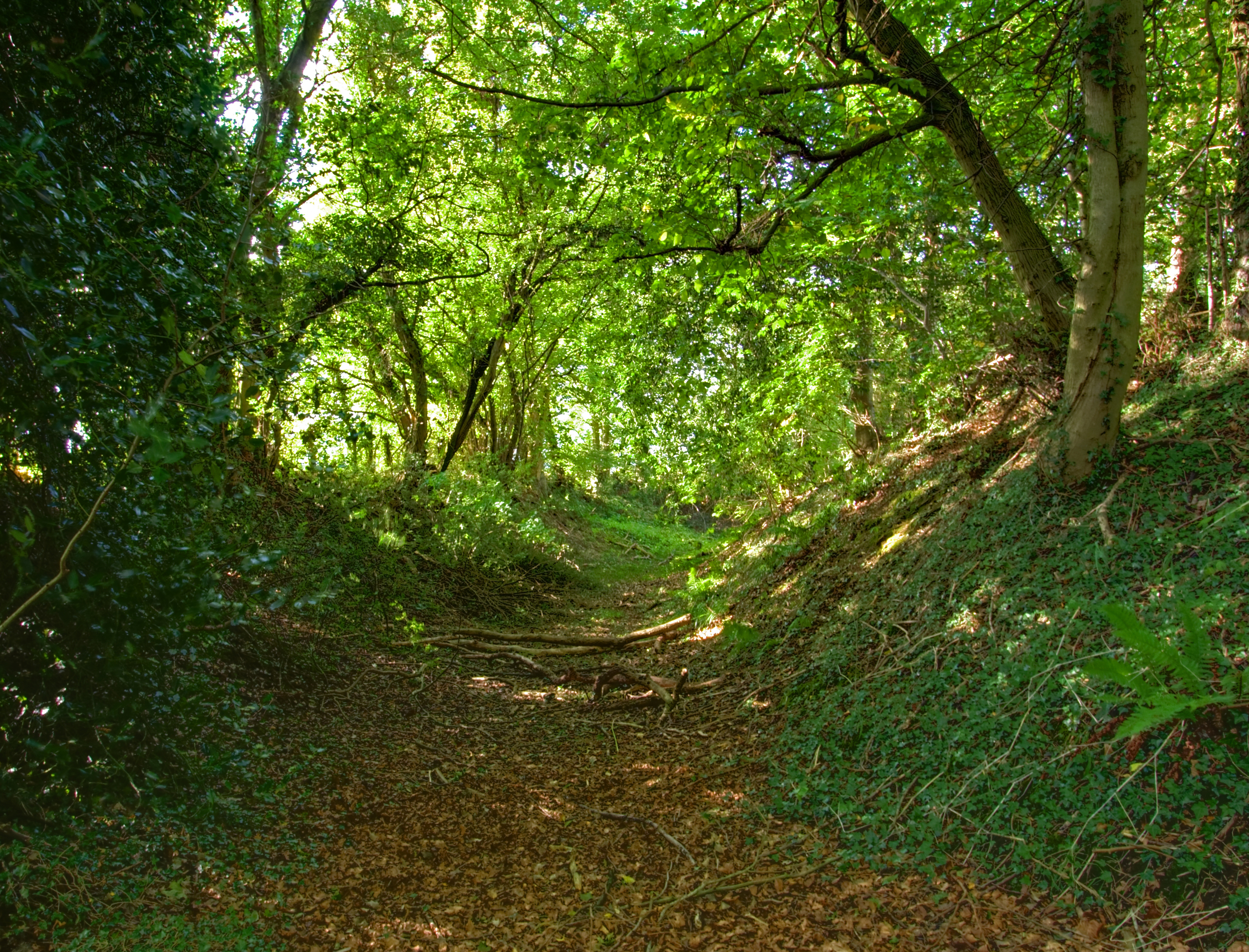
Hawridge court ringwork

Hawridge Court ringwork is a small, well-preserved medieval fortification located in Cholesbury-cum-St Leonards, in Buckinghamshire, England. Ringworks are relatively rare in the UK, and date from the late Anglo-Saxon period to the later 12th century. The site was designated a scheduled monument in 1996. It is under the care of English Heritage.

== Description ==
Hawridge Court ringwork, in Cholesbury-cum-St Leonards, Buckinghamshire is a good example of a ringwork, a type of medieval fortified defensive structure. It is located south of Hawridge Common, on the western side of a valley between the Chesham Vale and Cholesbury. The site consists of a small but strongly defended medieval fortification, oval in layout. Its earthworks stand to almost their full height, and are mostly intact with its surviving entranceway.

The interior of the ringwork measures approximately 60 m (200 ft) east to west, and 45 m (148 ft) north to south. It is surrounded by an earthen bank and external ditch. The bank varies between 8 m (26 ft) and 12 m (39 ft) in width. It rises nearly 5 m (16 ft) above the interior, the vertical sides leading to a narrow path along the top of the earthworks. The original entrance survives to the east, where a causeway, 12 m (39 ft) in width, passes through the bank and the ditch.

== History ==
Ringworks are a type of medieval fortification that date from the late Anglo-Saxon period to the late 12th century. They typically consist of a small defended area surrounded by a large ditch and bank. A timber fence or more rarely a stone wall would be built above the defensive earthworks. Inside the ringed defenses were buildings. Ringworks were used either for military operations or were built to defend manorial settlements. There are only 200 surviving examples of ringworks in the UK.

The Hawridge Court ringwork was most likely built after the Norman Conquest. The first recorded evidence of this medieval fortification appears in the 13th century, when the fortification was documented as belonging to the manor of Hawridge. The manor house buildings, which were probably built in the centre of the ringwork are believed to have been replaced by a new set of structures in the 16th century.

The northern section of the ringwork was removed several years later and its site was covered by an 18th-century farmhouse. The house was remodeled and enlarged in the early 1900s, and the interior of the ringwork was used as part of the layout in the gardens.

The site was designated a scheduled monument in 1996. The surviving structures within the ringwork are not included in the scheduling, but the underground areas beneath these buildings are included in order to safeguard any earlier features that lie below ground. It is under the care of English Heritage.

== See also ==
- Circular rampart
- Ringfort
- Scheduled monuments in Buckinghamshire
