= Aconbury =

Village in Herefordshire, England

Coordinates: 51.998°N 2.706°W

- Village
- Country: England
- Sovereign state: United Kingdom

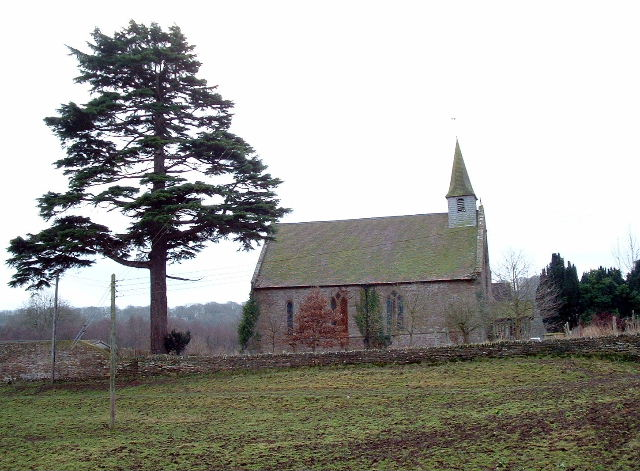
St John the Baptist church in Aconbury

Aconbury is a village in the English county of Herefordshire, situated on a road between Hereford and Ross-on-Wye.

St John the Baptist church was originally the church of a nunnery founded before 1237. The style of the current building is late 13th century. Some restoration work was carried out in 1863 by Sir George Gilbert Scott.

According to a Fortean Times article, a phantom monk was once exorcised into a bottle, which is now buried in the wall of the church.

On nearby Aconbury Hill is an Iron Age hillfort, Aconbury Camp.
