= Scheduled monuments in Norfolk =

List of scheduled monuments in the county of Norfolk, England

There are 486 scheduled monuments in the county of Norfolk, England. These protected sites date in some cases from the Neolithic period, and include barrows, medieval settlements, ruined abbeys, castles, and windmills. In the United Kingdom, the scheduling of monuments was first initiated to ensure the preservation of "nationally important" archaeological sites and historic buildings. Protection is given to scheduled monuments under the Ancient Monuments and Archaeological Areas Act 1979.

== Notable scheduled monuments in Norfolk ==
This is a partial list of scheduled monuments in Norfolk.

| Image | Name | Location | Date | Notes |
|---|---|---|---|---|
| | Baconsthorpe Castle | 52.89905°N 1.15213°E | 15th century | Ruined, fortified manor house. |
| | Beeston Reegis Priory | 52.938772°N 1.224176°E | 1216 AD | Augustinian Priory established in the early 13th century. |
| | Binham Priory | 52.91997°N 0.94523°E | late 11th century | A ruined Benedictine priory known for its history of scandals. |
| | Norwich Castle | 52.6286°N 1.2964°E | 1067 AD | Founded by William the Conqueror, the castle was initially constructed as a motte and bailey. |
| | Paston Great Barn | 52.85698°N 1.44760°E | 1581 AD | Medieval barn. A biological Site of Special Scientific Interest, one of six maternity colonies in Britain for the barbastelle bat. |
| | St Theobald's Church | 52.73449°N 1.34858°E | 11th century | Notable for the survival of the original nave, chancel, and 12th century round tower. |
| | Grimes Graves | 52.47585°N 0.67541°E | 2600–2300 BC | Large Neolithic flint mining complex. |
| | Wymondham Abbey | 52.57062°N 1.10749°E | 1107 AD | The church of the Benedictine Wymondham Abbey. |

== See also ==
- Grade I listed buildings in Norfolk
- List of scheduled monuments in the United Kingdom
