= Scheduled monuments in Northumberland =

List of scheduled monuments in the county of Northumberland, England

There are 1437 scheduled monuments in the county of Northumberland, England. These protected sites date in some cases from the Neolithic period, and include barrows, medieval settlements, ruined abbeys, castles, and Roman forts. In the United Kingdom, the scheduling of monuments was first initiated to ensure the preservation of "nationally important" archaeological sites and historic buildings. Protection is given to scheduled monuments under the Ancient Monuments and Archaeological Areas Act 1979.

== Notable scheduled monuments in Northumberland ==
This is a partial list of scheduled monuments in Northumberland.

| Image | Name | Location | Date | Notes |
|---|---|---|---|---|
| | Alnwick Abbey | 55.41985°N 1.71914°W | 1147 AD | Founded by Premonstratensian monks The only surviving remains are the 14th-century gatehouse. |
| | Etal Castle | 55.648°N 2.121°W | 1341 AD | A ruined medieval fortification |
| | Hexham Abbey | 54.972°N 2.103°W | 674 AD | Benedictine abbey. |
| | Housesteads Roman Fort | 55.013°N 2.331°W | c. 400 AD | One of the best-preserved forts on Hadrian's Wall. |
| | Lindisfarne Abbey | 55°40′48″N 01°48′09″W | 634 AD | The Lindisfarne Gospels were produced at the historic monastery. |
| | Union Chain Bridge | 55.7525°N 2.107°W | 1820 | The bridge was initially the longest wrought iron suspension bridge in the world, and the world's oldest vehicular suspension bridge. |
| | Warkworth Castle | 55°20′41″N 1°36′38″W | 12th century AD | Ruined motte-and-bailey castle. |
| | Vindolanda | 54.9911°N 2.3608°W | 85 AD–370 AD | A Roman auxiliary fort on Hadrian's Wall. |

== See also ==
- Grade I listed buildings in Northumberland
- List of scheduled monuments in the United Kingdom
