= Scheduled monuments in Northamptonshire =

List of scheduled monuments in the county of Northamptonshire, England

There are 221 scheduled monuments in the county of Northamptonshire, England. These protected sites date in some cases from the Neolithic period and include barrows, artillery forts, ruined abbeys, castles, and Iron Age hill forts. In the United Kingdom, the scheduling of monuments was first initiated to ensure the preservation of "nationally important" archaeological sites or historic buildings. Protection is given to scheduled monuments under the Ancient Monuments and Archaeological Areas Act 1979.

== Notable scheduled monuments in Northamptonshire ==
Image	Name	Location	Date	Notes
	Barnwell Castle	52.45563°N 0.46062°W	1132 AD	A motte and bailey castle built during the Second Barons' War (1264-67).
	Chichele College	52.30765°N 0.59297°W	Early 15th century	A rare surviving example of a chantry college. Chantry colleges were popular in the 14th-15th centuries in Britain. They provided priests a communal life that was more informal than a monastery.
	Cosgrove aqueduct	52.0687°N 0.8336°W	1811	A cast iron water bridge that carries the Grand Union Canal over the River Great Ouse.
	Fotheringhay Castle	52.5243°N 0.4362°W	1100 AD	A High Middle Age Norman Motte-and-bailey castle.
	Geddington Cross	52.438°N 0.687°W	1294 AD	The monument is the best preserved of the surviving Eleanor Crosses built by King Edward I in memory of his wife Eleanor. She died in Harby, Nottinghamshire in November 1290. The stone crosses were built in her memory to mark the nightly resting-places of her body as she was transported to Westminster Abbey.
	Roman town of Irchester	52.2783°N 0.6555°W	Roman Britain	The town is the site of an earlier Roman and Iron Age settlement and the medieval hamlet of Chester on the Water. The Roman settlement included buildings, a cemetery, town walls and a Romano-Celtic temple.
	Kirby Hall	52°31′27″N 0°38′14″W	1570	An Elizabethan country house
	Hunsbury Hill	52.21889°N 0.92023°W	Iron Age	An important example of a multivallate hillfort in Northamptonshire.
	Northampton Castle	52.237°N 0.905°W	1084	Remains of a legendary 11th century castle. The favorite castle of King John, parliament was held there during his reign. Thomas Becket was tried at the castle in 1164 before escaping the castle by dressing as a monk.

== See also ==
- Grade I listed buildings in Northamptonshire
- List of scheduled monuments in the United Kingdom
