= Kimbolton, Herefordshire =

Village in Herefordshire, England

Coordinates: 52.249°N 2.699°W

Kimbolton
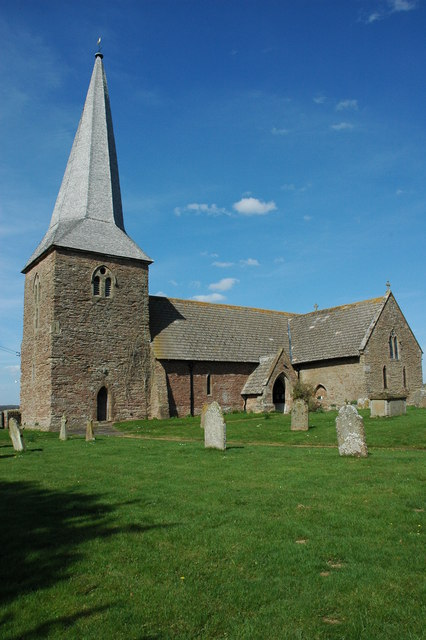
- St James the Great Church, Kimbolton

- Location within Herefordshire
- Population: 472
- Civil parish: Kimbolton
- Unitary authority: Herefordshire
- Ceremonial county: Herefordshire
- Region: West Midlands
- Country: England
- Sovereign state: United Kingdom
- Post town: Leominster
- Postcode district: HR6
- Dialling code: 01568
- Police: West Mercia
- Fire: Hereford and Worcester
- Ambulance: West Midlands
- UK Parliament: North Herefordshire

Kimbolton is a village and parish in Herefordshire, England, around 3 miles (5 km) north east of Leominster and 15 miles (24 km) north of Hereford. The village is on the A4112 road, near its junction with the A49 road. The church is dedicated to St James, has 13th-century features and has two Norman windows in the chancel. The spire is shingled.

Bach Camp, a small Iron Age hill fort, lies on a ridge above the Whyte Brook about 1.5 miles (2 km) south east of the church.

The parish had a population in mid-2010 of 434, increasing to 472 at the 2011 Census.

The village has a pub, The Stockton Cross and a Primary School with a separate Early Years nursery on site. There is also a village hall.

Kimbolton Chapel (now Kimbolton St James church) is one of the rumoured burial sites for Owain Glyndwr.
