= Scheduled monuments in Surrey =

List of scheduled monuments in the county of Surrey, England

There are 199 scheduled monuments in the county of Surrey, England. These protected sites date in some cases from the Neolithic period, and include medieval moated sites, ruined abbeys, castles, and bowl barrows. In the United Kingdom, the scheduling of monuments was first initiated to ensure the preservation of "nationally important" archaeological sites and historic buildings. Protection is given to scheduled monuments under the Ancient Monuments and Archaeological Areas Act 1979.

== Notable scheduled monuments in Surrey ==
This is a partial list of scheduled monuments in Surrey.

Image	Name	Location	Date	Notes
	Betchworth Castle	51.2375°N 0.2956°W	1449 AD	Ruined fortified medieval house.
	Brockham Limeworks	51.248°N 0.275°W	mid-19th century	Two well-preserved lime kilns that are important examples of two 19th-century lime kiln types, the flare kiln and the Brockham-patent kiln.
	Caesar's Camp	51.243°N 0.804°W	Iron Age	A multivallate Iron Age hill fort.
	Farnham Castle	51.219°N 0.8025°W	1138 AD	Home of the Bishops of Winchester for 800 years. King John (1166–1216) and Elizabeth I (1533–1603) were frequent visitors to the castle.
	Guildford Castle	51°14′04″N 0°34′21″W	c. 1086 AD	Possibly built by William the Conqueror after the 1066 invasion of England.
	Starborough Castle	51°10′42″N 0°02′19″E	1341 AD	Fortified manor house. Remodeled in the Gothic revival style in the 18th century and converted into a garden house.
	Waverley Abbey	51°12′00″N 0°45′36″W	1128 AD	The first Cistercian abbey established in England.
	Wye College	51.18400°N 0.93893°E	1447 AD	A rare, surviving example of medieval chantry college buildings.

== See also ==
- Grade I listed buildings in Surrey
- List of scheduled monuments in the United Kingdom
