= Scheduled monuments in Leicestershire =

List of scheduled monuments in the county of Leicestershire, England

There are 208 scheduled monuments in the county of Leicestershire, England. These protected sites date in some cases from the Neolithic period and include barrows, ruined abbeys, castles, moated sites, churchyard crosses and Iron Age hill forts. In the United Kingdom, the scheduling of monuments was first initiated to ensure the preservation of "nationally important" archaeological sites or historic buildings. Protection is given to scheduled monuments under the Ancient Monuments and Archaeological Areas Act 1979.

== Notable scheduled monuments in Leicestershire ==
Image	Name	Location	Date	Notes
	Ashby de la Zouch Castle	52°44′46″N 1°27′59″W	late 15th century	A ruined fortified manor that is the setting of Sir Walter Scott's novel Ivanhoe in 1819.
	Burrough Hill	52.699754°N 0.875517°W	Iron Age	An Iron Age hillfort that is sited on a limestone hill with a well-defended position.
	Churchyard cross, Tilton on the Hill	52.64394°N 0.90531°W	13th century	The medieval cross in St. Peter's churchyard is a good example of a 13th-century standing cross in a church burial ground.
	King Richard III Visitor Centre	52.6342°N 1.1362°W	1485	The former grave of Richard III is now enclosed in a new King Richard III visitor centre.
	Kirby Muxloe Castle	52.6366°N 1.2272°W	1480	The fortified manor house was built for Lord Hastings, who was seized and executed by Richard III in 1483.
	Launde Abbey	52.6312°N 0.8234°W	1540	The monument is an Elizabethan manor house built on the site of an Augustinian priory.
	Leicester Abbey	52.648948°N 1.13687°W	1143	Historians believe the Augustinian abbey to be of the wealthiest and most important Augustinian houses in England.
	Sauvey Castle	52.64394°N 0.90531°W	early 12th century	The medieval castle was built during the reign of King Stephen (1135–54).
	Ulverscroft Priory	52.709889°N 1.259861°W	1134	Above ground remains of the priory date from the 13th through the 15th centuries.

== See also ==
- Grade I listed buildings in Leicestershire
- Scheduled monuments in Leicester
- List of scheduled monuments in the United Kingdom
