= Scheduled monuments in Wiltshire =

This is a list of scheduled monuments in Wiltshire.

In the United Kingdom, a scheduled monument is a "nationally important" archaeological site or historic building that has been given protection against unauthorised change by being placed on a list (or "schedule") by the Secretary of State for Culture, Media and Sport; English Heritage takes the leading role in identifying such sites. Scheduled monuments are defined in the Ancient Monuments and Archaeological Areas Act 1979 and the National Heritage Act 1983. There are about 20,000 scheduled monument entries on the list, which is maintained by English Heritage; more than one site can be included in a single entry.

While a scheduled monument can also be recognised as a listed building, English Heritage considers listed building status as a better way of protecting buildings than scheduled monument status. If a monument is considered by English Heritage to "no longer merit scheduling" it can be descheduled.

== List ==
Wiltshire has over 1,000 scheduled monuments.

Image	Name and reference	Feature	Location	Notes
	Adam's Grave	Barrow	Alton Barnes; SU11466178	A Neolithic long barrow
	Bulford Kiwi	Monument	bulford SU1998543924	A chalk figure of a kiwi constructed by the New Zealand Expeditionary Force in 1919
	Caen Hill Locks	Structure	Devizes; ST9821861550	A series of lock gates up a hill
	Grovely Castle	Castle	Steeple Langford; SU048357	An Iron Age fort
	Stonehenge	Monument	Amesbury; SU1215342256	A prehistoric monument
	Swanborough Tump	Barrow	Pewsey; SU130601	A bowl barrow
