= Bach Camp =

Hill fort in Herefordshire, England

- Location within Herefordshire
- 52°14′21″N 2°39′55″W
- Type: Hillfort
- Location: near Kimbolton, Herefordshire
- OS grid reference: SO 54656 60235

Scheduled monument
- Designated: 14 January 1938
- Reference no.: 1007316

Bach Camp is a hill fort near Kimbolton, Herefordshire, England.

According to Historic England it is a "large univallate hill fort" that "survives well". It is on the top of a hill or ridge overlooking a junction of the Whyle Brook. It has three entrances, though one may be modern (Historic England and Megalithic portal variously describe the modern entrance as western or southern). It has only one line of ramparts, 5.1 metres at the highest point, which enclose about 4.1 hectares. It has been a scheduled monument since 1938. The site has not yet been dated, but historic England are confident that there is archeological evidence as yet not dug.

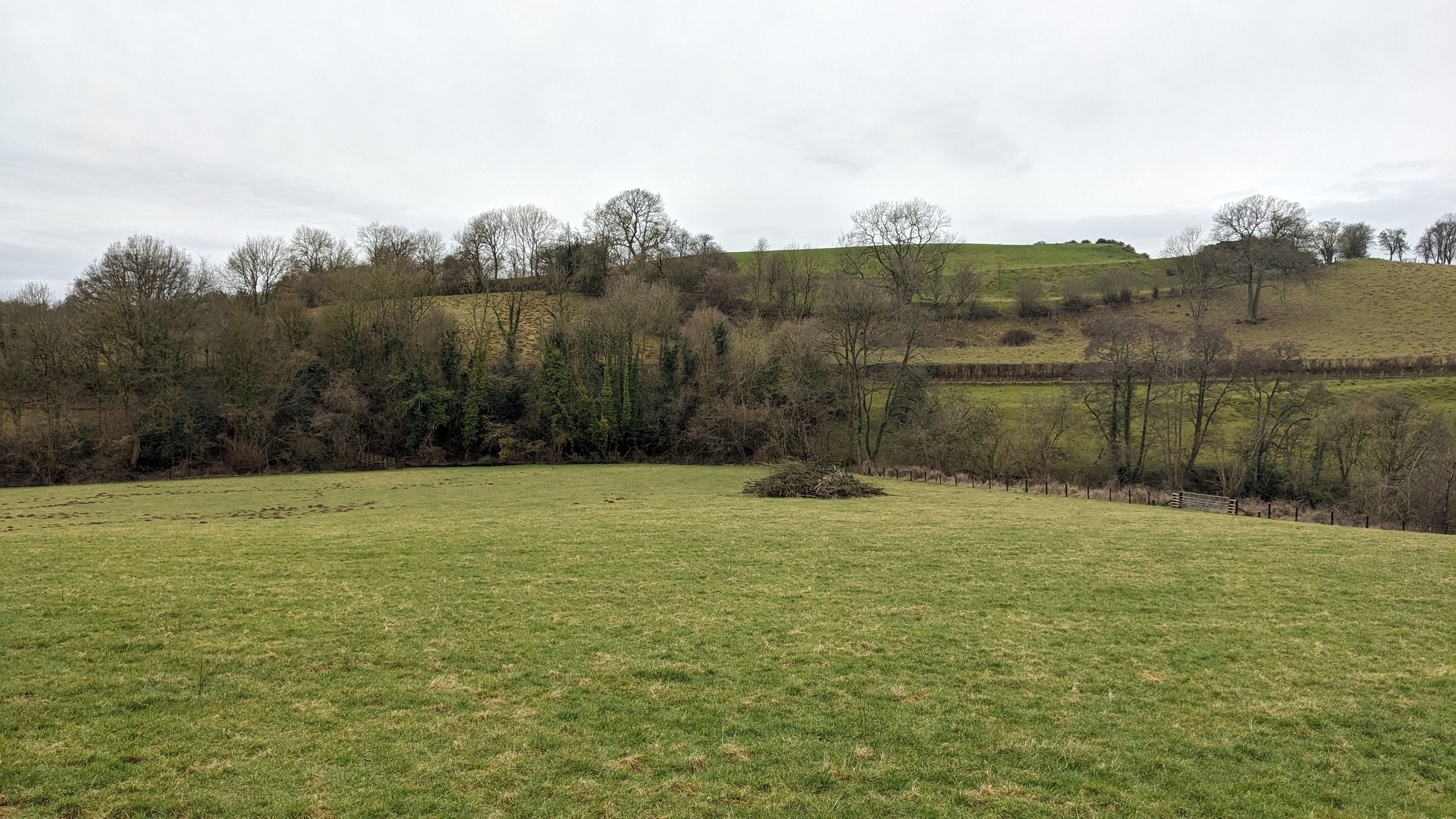
View of Bach Camp

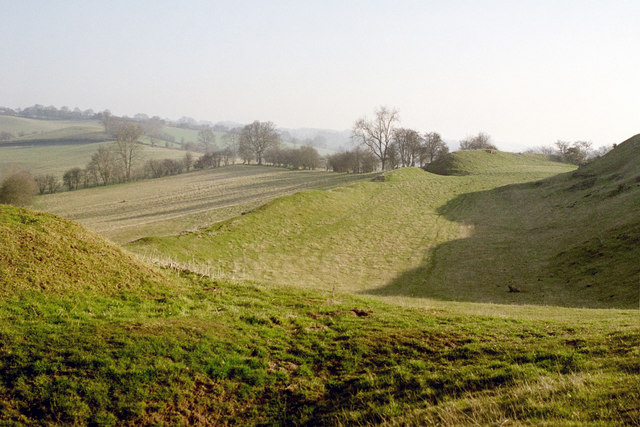
View from Bach Camp

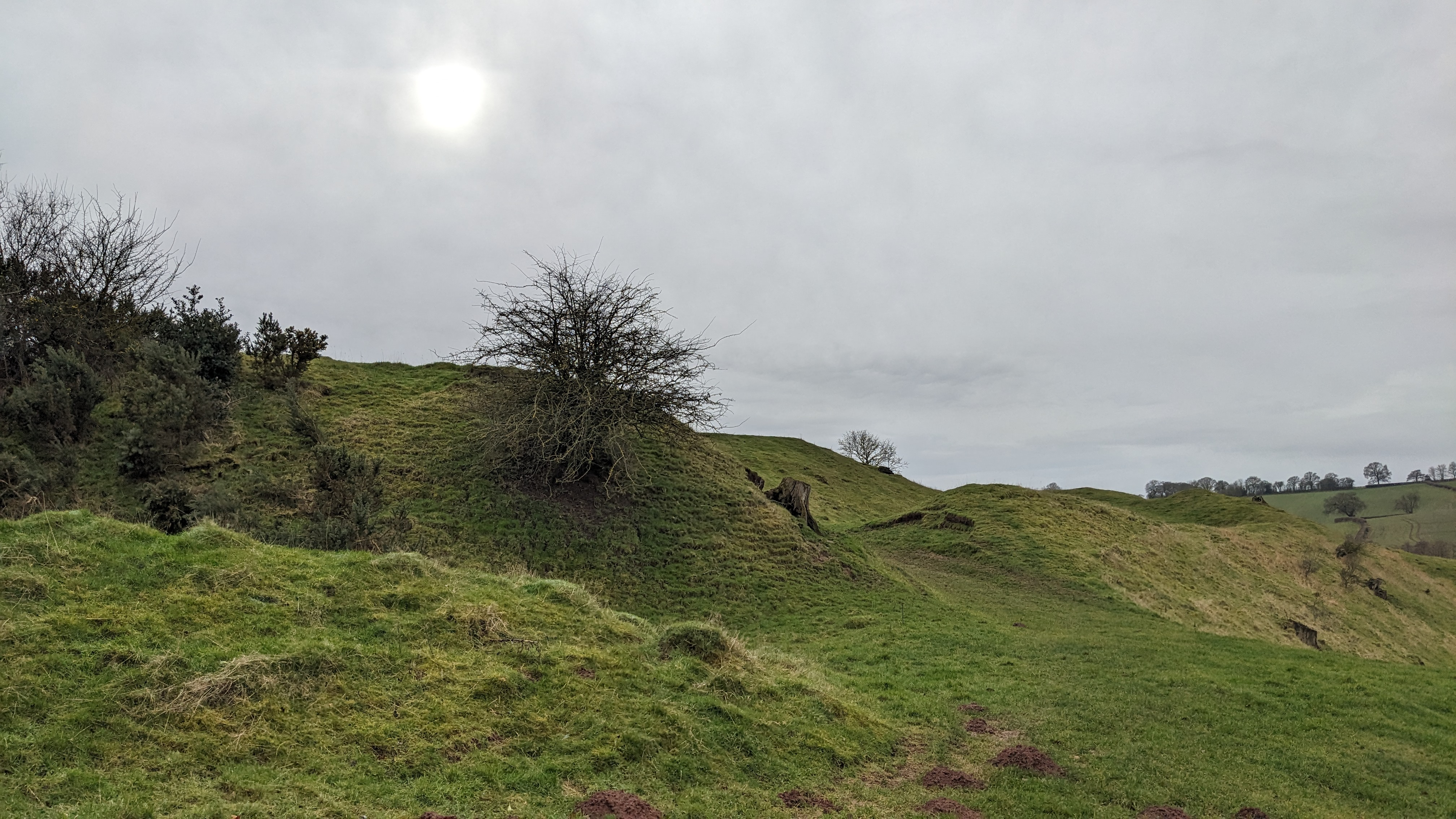
Earthworks at Bach Camp

== See also ==
- The Herefordshire Trail
