= All Saints Church, Segenhoe =

Ruined church in Segenhoe, Bedfordshire, England

Coordinates: 52°00′43″N 0°34′18″W

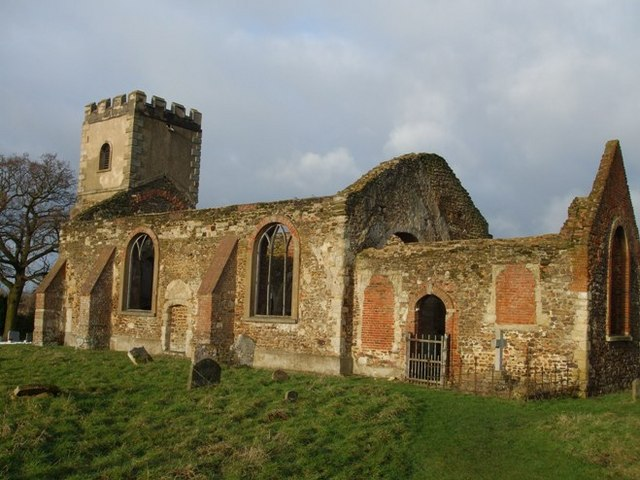
All Saints Church, Segenhoe

All Saints Church, Segenhoe is a ruined medieval church located near the village of Ridgmont, Bedfordshire. It contains architectural details that range from the 11th century when it was first built to the 19th century. The church was abandoned in 1855 when a larger church was built in Ridgmont. The cemetery continues to be used for burials. The church is managed by Central Bedfordshire Council. All Saints Church is designated a scheduled Ancient Monument.

== Description ==
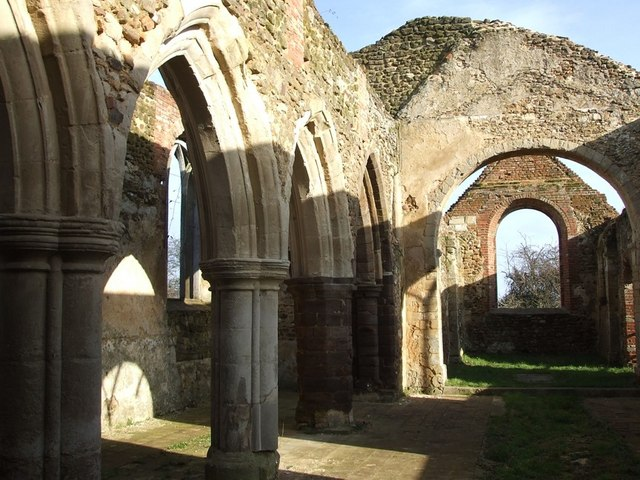
Interior of All Saints Church, Segenhoe

All Saints Church, Segenhoe, also known as Old All Saints Church, can be found southeast of the village of Ridgmont in Bedfordshire, England. Built in the 11th century, the oldest parts of the building are made of brown cobblestone. The layout of the church consists of a chancel, nave, north aisle, and west tower. The chancel has most of its original foundation; its east wall was repaired in brick in the 18th century. The nave has a north aisle built primarily in the 14th century. The tower was probably built in the 13th century and was repaired with brick in the 18th century. Other repairs to the building were most likely done in the 18th century.

The north aisle of the church has two large arched windows. In between the windows and to the north is the remodeled brick porch which dates to 1819. On the north wall of the chancel, are two small single lancet windows with a decorative lintel that date to the late Anglo-Saxon era. The south side of the chancel has blocked windows and a priest’s door. The west tower originally included a timber bell-cote. In 1826, the top part of the present tower was added to the tower. The remains of stone rood stairs are located near the east wall of the north aisle. The stairs originally led up to the rood loft which was situated above a wooden rood screen, which divided the nave from the chancel.

== History ==
The church was most likely built after the Norman Conquest of 1066. The Domesday Book in 1086 records that Walter, Brother of Sihere held land in Segenhoe, but no church building is mentioned. Segenhoe first appears in the written record in 1189 when the advowson was granted to Dunstable Priory.

The historic manor of Segenhoe which dates from 18th century is still in existence to the east of the church along with the 19th century buildings of Manor Farm. As the current village of nearby Ridgmont expanded, the importance of Segenhoe declined. A new, larger church was built in Ridgmont in 1855, and the old church was turned into a mortuary chapel. The church later fell into disrepair and was abandoned. As the new church in Rigmont has no graveyard, the old graveyard at Segenhoe continues to be used in the community.

The building is designated a scheduled Ancient Monument. The church is managed by the Central Bedfordshire Council.
