= Scheduled monuments in Merseyside =

This is a list of scheduled monuments in Merseyside, a metropolitan county in England.

== Knowsley ==
None.

== Liverpool ==
- The Calderstones
- Edge Hill Engine Station
- Robin Hood's Stone

== St Helens ==
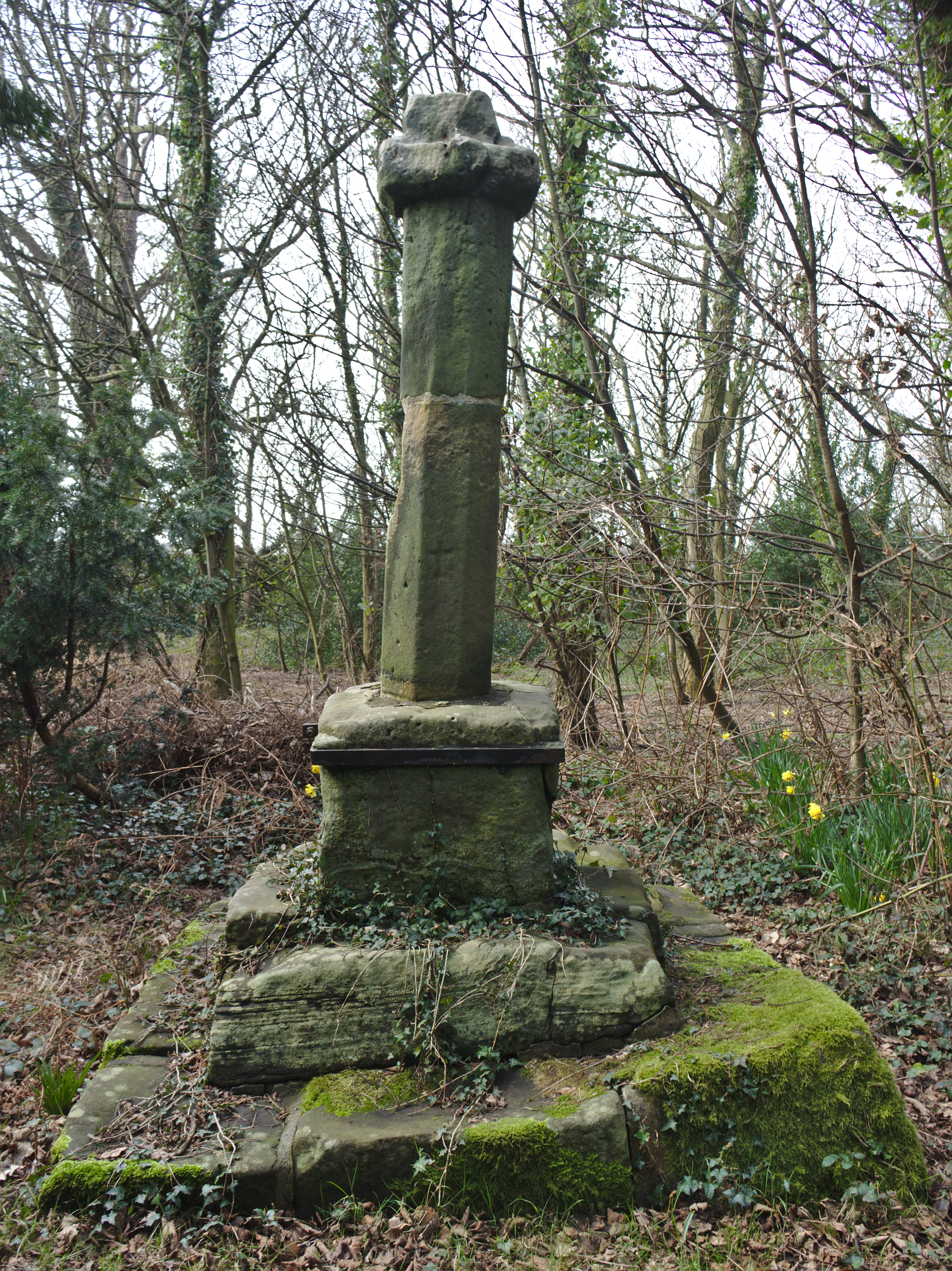
Wayside cross, Crosby Hall

- Cannington Shaw Bottle Shop, Sherdley Works

== Sefton ==
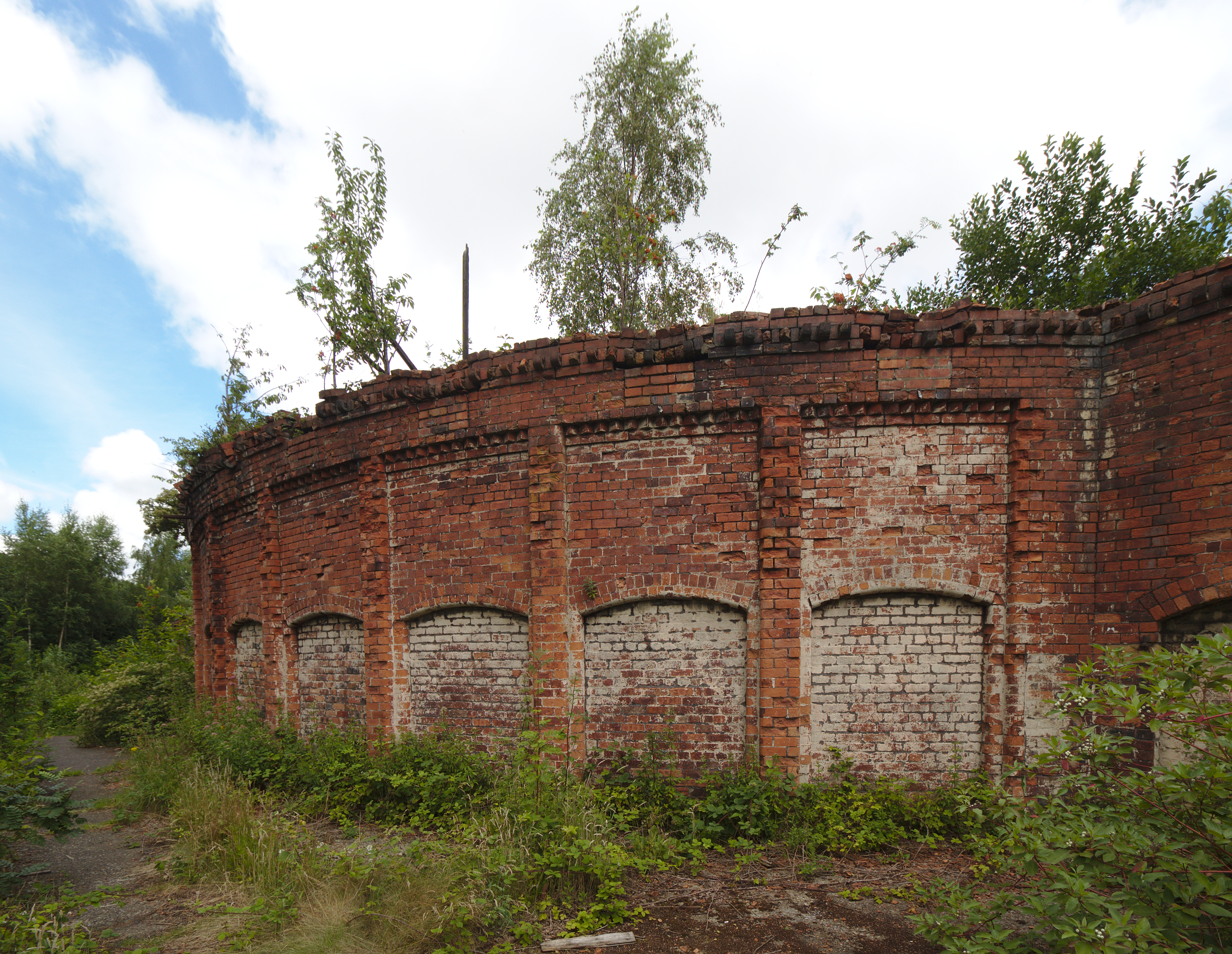
Rounded end of Cannington Shaw Bottle Shop

- Wayside cross, Crosby Hall
- St Catherine's Chapel, Lydiate

== Wirral ==
- Birkenhead Priory
