= Scheduled monuments in Nottinghamshire =

This is a list of scheduled monuments in Nottinghamshire, a county in England.

In the United Kingdom, a scheduled monument is a "nationally important" archaeological site or historic building that has been given protection against unauthorised change by being placed on a list (or "schedule") by the Secretary of State for Culture, Media and Sport; English Heritage takes the leading role in identifying such sites. Scheduled monuments are defined in the Ancient Monuments and Archaeological Areas Act 1979 and the National Heritage Act 1983. There are about 20,000 Scheduled Monument entries on the list, which is maintained by English Heritage; more than one site can be included in a single entry.

While a scheduled monument can also be recognised as a listed building, English Heritage considers listed building status as a better way of protecting buildings than scheduled monument status. If a monument is considered by English Heritage to "no longer merit scheduling" it can be descheduled.

Nottinghamshire has over 160 scheduled monuments including various Roman, medieval and Civil War sites, buildings and ruins.

== List ==
Image	Name	Feature	Location	Notes
Annesley Old Church	All Saints Church and graveyard	Church	Annesley, Ashfield	Remains of medieval C13th church and graveyard. The church was abandoned when a new church for the colliery village of Annesley was built in 1874.
Anglo-Saxon cross in St Helen's parish churchyard	Anglian high cross in the churchyard of St Helen's Church	Cross	Stapleford, Broxtowe	
Annesley Castle Motte	Annesley motte and bailey castle	Castle	Annesley, Ashfield	
Archbishop's Palace Ruins	Archbishop's Palace	Building	Southwell	The palace dates from the 14th Century. Cardinal Wolsey lived here. The arrest of Charles Ӏ was formalised here, following his capture in Southwell.
	Averham moat and enclosure	Moated site	Averham, Newark	
	Beacon Hill camp	Settlement	Gringley on the Hill, Bassetlaw	
Beauvale Priory Remains	Beauvale Priory	Building	Greasley, Broxtowe	Priory established at Beauvale in 1343 for the Carthusian Order by Sir Nicholas de Cantilupe (Lord of Ilkeston in Derbyshire and Lord of Greasley in Nottinghamshire), with Royal consent from Edward III.
Beeston Lodge, Clipstone Peel	Beeston Lodge	Building	Clipstone, Mansfield	The 14th century site was a fortified agricultural community enclosed by Edward II as an addendum to the south-west of Clipstone Park.
Bestwood Colliery winding engine house & headstocks	Bestwood Colliery engine house	Building	Bestwood St. Albans	The country's only example of a vertical duplex steam winding engine. Built in 1873 at the Worsley Mesnes Ironworks, Wigan. The pit closed in 1967.
	Bingham medieval settlement	Settlement	Bingham	Immediately west of Carnarvon School
Blyth New Bridge	Blyth New Bridge	Bridge	Blyth, Bassetlaw	Grade I listed bridge, built by John Carr in 1770, which carries the A634 over the River Ryton.
Blyth Church, which incorporates part of the former priory	Blyth Priory	Building	Blyth, Bassetlaw	Blyth Priory was founded in 1088 by Roger de Busli, as a house of Benedictine Monks.
	Blyth School	Building	Blyth, Bassetlaw	
Bothamsall motte	Bothamsall motte and bailey castle and hollow way	Castle	Bothamsall, Bassetlaw	Overlooking the River Meden
	Bowl barrow at Holbeck	Barrow	Holbeck, Bassetlaw	240m SSE of Woodend Farm
	Bowl barrow at Laxton	Barrow	Laxton and Moorhouse, Newark	70m South of church of St Michael
	Bowl barrow at Perlethorpe	Barrow	Perlethorpe cum Budby, Newark	452m NW of Cameleon Lodge
	Bowl barrow at Thorpe	Barrow	Thorpe, Newark	160m SE of Wharf Farm
	Castle Hill	Castle	Thurgarton, Newark	
	Castle Hill fortified manor	Fort	Ashfield	
	Caves at Drury Hill	Cave	Nottingham	
	Caves under Nos 3-7 Middle Pavement	Cave	Nottingham	
	Cellar under No 8, Castle Gate	Building	Nottingham	
	Civil War defences	Military	Coddington, Newark	270m and 300m West of Vale Farm
	Civil War fieldwork on Crankley Point	Military	South Muskham, Newark	
	Civil War gun battery at Shelford	Military	Shelford and Newton, Rushcliffe	50m SW of St Peters and St Paul's Church
	Civil War gun battery and covered way	Military	Wiverton Hall, Rushcliffe	Immediately SE of Wiverton Hall
	Civil War redoubt at Newark	Military	Newark	550m SE of Valley Farm
	Civil War redoubt at Newark	Military	Newark	680m NW of Dairy Farm
	Civil War redoubt at South Muskham	Military	South Muskham, Newark	580m ENE of sugar refinery
	Civil War redoubt on Beacon Hill	Military	Newark	550m NW of The Firs
	Civil War redoubt on Crankley Point	Military	South Muskham, Newark	
	Civil War sconce at Newark	Military	Newark	650m NW of Devon Bridge
	Civil War Sconce at South Muskham	Military	South Muskham, Newark	150m West of Muskham Bridge
	Civil War town defences within the Friary Garden	Military	Newark	
	Coal mining remains at Broad Oak Farm	Mining	Strelley, Broxtowe	
	Cockpit Hill, Ramsdale Park	Earthwork	Calverton	A circular earthwork bank of a hillfort, excavated in 1974.
Cranmer's Mound, Aslockton	Cranmer's Mound	Moated site	Aslockton, Rushcliffe	Motte castle, prospect mound, moated fishponds, enclosure, hollow way and ridge and furrow
Mother Grundy's Parlour Cave, Creswell Crags	Creswell Gorge Palaeolithic and later prehistoric sites, including Pinhole Cave, Mother Grundy's Parlour and Robin Hood's Cave	Settlement	Creswell, Worksop	Creswell Crags is a limestone gorge on the border between Derbyshire and Nottinghamshire, near the villages of Creswell and Whitwell. The cliffs in the ravine contain several caves that were occupied during the last ice age, between around 43,000 and 10,000 years ago. Its caves contain the northernmost cave art in Europe.
Boat House Cave, Creswell Crags	Creswell Gorge Palaeolithic and later prehistoric sites, including Boat House Cave and Church Hole Cave	Settlement	Creswell, Worksop	See above
	Crococalana Roman town	Settlement	Collingham, Newark	Brough was the site of the Roman town of Crococalana, which grew around a military fort of the 1st century. The town spread along the Fosse Way for about a mile, and had ditched defences.
Celtic Type Cross, Laxton Churchyard	Cross in St Michael's churchyard	Cross	Laxton and Moorhouse, Newark	
Cuckney motte and bailey castle	Cuckney Castle	Castle	Cuckney, Bassetlaw	A motte and bailey fortress founded by Thomas de Cuckney. The low remains can be found at the edge of the churchyard of St Mary's Church, Norton Cuckney.
	Dog Island moat near Gainsborough	Moated site	Beckingham, Bassetlaw	
	Dovecote at Barnby Hall	Building	Barnby in the Willows, Newark	250m NW of Barnby Hall
	Dovecote at Flintham	Building	Flintham, Rushcliffe	240m East of Home Farm
	Dovecote at Home Farm	Building	Nottingham	600m east of Home Farm
	Dovecote at Manor Farm	Building	Barton in Fabis, Rushcliffe	
	Earlshaw Hall moat	Moated site	Caunton, Newark	
	Earthwork to East of Wellow	Earthwork	Wellow	
	Fishponds at Annesley	Ponds	Annesley, Ashfield	170m South of Damstead Farm
	Fishponds at Ashfield	Ponds	Ashfield	220m East of St Wilfrid's Church
	Fishponds at Broxtowe	Ponds	Broxtowe	90m south east St Mary's Church
	Fishponds at Laxton	Ponds	Laxton and Moorhouse, Newark	220m SW of St Michael's Church
	Fleet Plantation moated site	Moated site	Rampton, Bassetlaw	
	Formal and water gardens at Shireoaks Hall	Gardens	Shireoaks, Bassetlaw	
	Fountain Dale moat	Moated site	Lindhurst, Newark	
	Fox Wood earthworks	Earthwork	Calverton	Site of a hillfort with oval ditches and banks.
	Gaddick Hill medieval motte and bailey castle and post-medieval manor house	Castle	Egmanton, Newark	
Remains of Greasley Castle	Greasley Castle	Castle	Greasley, Broxtowe	In 1340 Sir Nicholas de Cantelupe converted his manor house (alongside Greasley church) into Greasley Castle. Greasley Castle Farm now stands on the site.
	Gun platform	Military	South Muskham, Newark	440m SE of Muskham Bridge
Haughton Chapel Remains	Haughton Chapel	Building	Haughton, Bassetlaw	Ruin of St James' church at Haughton. The earliest parts of the building are 12th-century. The roof was lost in 1915.
	Haughton decoy and motte and bailey castle	Castle	Haughton, Bassetlaw	
	Hawton moated site, fishpond, Civil War redoubt and ridge and furrow	Moated site	Hawton, Newark	
	Hayton Castle moated site and fishpond	Moated site	Hayton, Bassetlaw	
	Henge at Bingham	Henge	Bingham, Rushcliffe	850m SE of Foss Road Farm
	Henge at Gunthorpe	Henge	Gunthorpe, Newark	120m South of Lodge Farm
	Iron Age settlement	Settlement	South Muskham, Newark	
	Jordan Castle	Castle	Wellow, Newark	Ringwork, fortified manor, hollow way, fishpond and ridge and furrow
	Kilvington medieval settlement and part of an open field system	Settlement	Kilvington, Newark	400m SW of Staunton Hall
King John's Palace at Clipstone	King John's Palace	Building	King's Clipstone, Mansfield	Remains of a former medieval royal residence in Clipstone. It has been known as "King John's Palace" (although King John only spent a few days here) since the 18th century. It was previously known as the "King's Houses", built for Henry II from 1176 within a deer park.
King's Mill Viaduct, Kings Mill Lane	King's Mill Viaduct	Bridge	Mansfield	Five arch viaduct built by Josiah Jessop to carry the Mansfield & Pinxton Railway, a horse-drawn railway constructed in 1819 to transport stone and lime from Mansfield to the head of the Pinxton branch of the Cromford Canal. The structure remained in use as part of a siding until 1970. The viaduct now carries a footpath.
	Langford medieval village	Settlement	Langford, Newark	Includes moat and open field system 450m NW of Elmtree Farm
Remains of Lenton Priory	Lenton Priory	Church	Nottingham	
	Little Carlton medieval village and part of the meadow field system	Settlement	South Muskham, Newark	Earthworks and buried remains of Little Carlton medieval village, referred to as Carleton in the Domesday Book of 1086.
	Manor Farm moat	Moated site	Scrooby, Bassetlaw	
View towards Margidunum	Margidunum Roman Station	Settlement	Bingham, Rushcliffe	The Roman camp of Margidunum is situated on the Fosse Way, halfway between Leicester and Lincoln.
Market Cross, Gringley on the Hill	Market cross at Gringley	Cross	Gringley on the Hill, Bassetlaw	Stone cross at the junction of Cross Hill and High Street. A plaque on the steps of the cross states that a market charter was granted to the village on 2 November 1252.
Kirkby Cross, Kirkby in Ashfield	Market cross, Kirkby in Ashfield	Cross	Ashfield	
	Markham Moor Bridge (or 'Mirihil' Bridge)	Bridge	West Drayton, Bassetlaw	
Mattersey Priory Ruins	Mattersey Priory Gilbertine monastery	Building	Mattersey, Bassetlaw	The priory was founded by Roger FitzRalph in 1185, and was dedicated to St Helen. It was constructed on a gravel island in the River Idle.
	Medieval city wall	Defences	Nottingham	
	Medieval market cross and 19th century commemorative cross	Cross	Colston Bassett, Rushcliffe	
	Medieval settlement and open field system	Settlement	West Burton, Bassetlaw	Immediately SE of Low Farm
	Medieval settlement and remains of open fields	Settlement	East Stoke, Newark	Immediately west of East Stoke village
	Medieval settlement including a moated site and open field system	Settlement	West Markham, Bassetlaw	Immediately NE and South of Hall Farm
	Medieval village	Settlement	Sibthorpe, Rushcliffe	Including monastic college, chapel, moat, fishponds, dovecote and open field system 200m South of Manor Farm
	Minor Romano-British villa	Building	Car Colston, Rushcliffe	Moat and associated medieval manorial and village earthworks, including six fishponds
	Moat and fishpond at Strelley	Moated site	Strelley, Broxtowe	240m SE of All Saints' Church
	Moat, fishpond, enclosures, hollow way and postmill mound	Moated site	Kinoulton, Rushcliffe	600m NW of Barland Fields
	Moat, three fishponds, enclosures, hollow way and part of a road at Hall Yard	Moated site	Weston, Newark	
	Moat, two fishponds, boundary bank and ditch and two leats	Moated site	Whatton-in-the-Vale, Rushcliffe	
	Moat, two fishponds, fishstews and pond bay	Moated site	Coddington, Newark	West of Balderton Lane
	Moated fishpond complex	Moated site	Egmanton, Newark	With moat, fishstews, seven fishponds with sluices, ridge and furrow and a leat
	Moated site	Moated site	Newark	750m NW of Dairy Farm
	Moated site and fishpond east of Misson village	Moated site	Misson, Bassetlaw	
	Moated site and fishponds	Moated site	Rushcliffe	225m North of Wiverton Hall
	Moated site west of Church Road	Moated site	Harby, Newark	
	Moated site, fishponds and decoy pond	Moated site	Winkburn, Newark	490m NW of Park Spring Farm
	Motte and bailey castle adjacent to River Trent	Castle	East Bridgford, Rushcliffe	
	Motte and bailey castle and associated medieval and post-medieval manorial remains, including six fishponds	Castle	Laxton and Moorhouse, Newark	
	Mound at Oxton	Earthwork	Oxton	270m West of Moorfields Farm
	Mound at Syke Breck Farm	Earthwork	Blidworth	
	Mound, East of Haywood Oaks Farm	Earthwork	Blidworth	
	Mound on Hamilton Hill	Earthwork	Ashfield	
	Mound, South of Sand Lane	Earthwork	Besthorpe, Newark	
Newark Castle by River Trent	Newark Castle	Castle	Newark	Castle was founded in Newark-on-Trent in the mid-12th century by Alexander, Bishop of Lincoln. Originally a timber castle, it was rebuilt in stone towards the end of the century. Dismantled in the 17th century after the English Civil War, the castle was restored in the 19th century.
	Newark town wall (Lombard Street)	Defences	Newark	
	Newbold medieval settlement and part of the open field system	Settlement	Kinoulton, Rushcliffe	330m NE of Manor Farm
	Norwell Woodhouse moat and fishpond	Moated site	Norwell, Newark	
Nottingham Castle gate house	Nottingham Castle	Castle	Nottingham	Medieval motte and bailey castle built in 1068. In 1651 all of the fortifications were demolished except for the gatehouse and the base of Edward IV's tower.
	Old Hall moat and two fishponds	Moated site	Norwell, Newark	
Old Trent Bridge	Old Trent Bridge	Bridge	Rushcliffe, Nottingham	Replaced by the current Trent Bridge in 1871.
	Oldox camp	Settlement	Oxton	Hill-fort that is roughly triangular and encloses 1.5 acres. Roman coins in a pot and a Saxon burial have been found here.
Papplewick Pumping Station	Papplewick Pumping Station	Building	Papplewick	Near the village of Papplewick, built by Nottingham Corporation Water Department between 1881 and 1884 to pump water from the Bunter sandstone to provide drinking water to the City of Nottingham.
Queen's Sconce, Newark-on-Trent	Queen's Sconce	Military	Devon Park, Newark	Civil War sconce built by the Royalist army as part of the defences around Newark-on-Trent. The earthwork is larger than 100m x 100m with 9m high ramparts.
	Rectangular barrows at North Muskham	Barrow	North Muskham, Newark	
	Ringwork at Kingshaugh Farm	Earthwork	East Markham, Bassetlaw	
	Rock cut houses N of Castle Boulevard	Building	Nottingham	
	Rock cut houses S of Nottingham Castle	Building	Nottingham	
	Rolleston Manor	Moated site	Rolleston, Newark	Three moats, eight fishponds with sluices, ridge and furrow and a leat
Site of Roman Camp at Calverton	2 Roman camps at Calverton	Settlement	Calverton	Flat present fields (to the West of Dover Beck, which feeds the River Trent) have no standing remains. Buried structures are clearly visible though on aerial photographs. The site is about 300m x 300m. At the junction of Whinbush Lane and B6386, 350m NE of Lodge Farm Hoards of Roman coins have also been found in Calverton as recently as 1960.
Site of Roman Camp at Farnsfield	Roman camp at Farnsfield	Settlement	Farnsfield	No standing remains in the present fields but excavations in 1978 revealed Roman defensive ditches and remains. Outlines of the camp structure are clearly visible on aerial photos, including the satellite view on Google Maps. The camp was about 200m x 200m. By Longland Lane, 470m South of Carr Banks Farm
	Roman camp at Holme	Settlement	Holme, Newark	750m East of Church Cottages
	Roman fort and a section of Roman road	Fort	Scaftworth, Bassetlaw	350m NW of Holly House Farm
	Roman site on Red Hill	Settlement	Thrumpton, Rushcliffe	
	Roman vexillation fortress	Fort	Edingley, Southwell	310m and 530m South of Osmanthorpe Manor
	Roman villa at Oldcoates	Building	Styrrup with Oldcotes, Bassetlaw	
	Roman villa complex and Anglo-Saxon cemetery	Building	Southwell	
	Roman villa at Mansfield	Building	Mansfield	ESE of Northfield House
	Romano-British nucleated enclosed settlement and Roman villa complex at Glebe Farm	Settlement	Barton in Fabis, Rushcliffe	
	Round Hill at Lambley		Lambley, Gedling	
Rufford Abbey	Rufford Abbey Cistercian monastery	Building	Rufford	Monastic precinct, water-management works, pre-monastic open-field system and post-medieval building
	Saxon cemetery	Cemetery	Upper Broughton, Rushcliffe	SW of Broughton Lodge
	Segelocum Roman town	Settlement	Sturton Le Steeple, Bassetlaw	
	Settlement at Cromwell	Settlement	Cromwell, Newark	1200m West of Cromwell Village
	Settlement site at Morton	Settlement	Fiskerton cum Morton, Newark	
	Site at Cromwell		Cromwell, Newark NNE of village	Discovered by aerial photography
	Site of Abbey Church		Newstead	
	Site of Ad Pontem, Stoke by Newark		Thorpe, Newark	
	Site of Old Hall, South of Haughton Hall Farm		Haughton, Bassetlaw	
	Site of pit alignments		South Muskham, Newark	
	Skegby Manor House	Building	Ashfield	Remains of a medieval hall and earthwork from the early C13th. Immediately SE of Pond Cottage
Combs Farm Camp Iron Age Hillfort	Slight univallate (single-walled) hillfort	Fort	Farnsfield	Visible remains of Iron Age Hillfort are an earthwork bank surrounded by a ditch. Buried remains, pottery fragments, Roman tiles and a Bronze Age axe have been found here. 170m West of Combs Farm
West tower of the ruined St Helen's parish church	St Helen's Church	Church	South Wheatley, Bassetlaw	
	St John Baptist's Church and graveyard	Church	Colwick, Nottingham	
Ruins of St Mary's Church	St Mary's Church	Church	Colston Bassett, Rushcliffe	
St Wilfrid's Graveyard	St Wilfrid's Church and churchyard	Church	Kinoulton, Rushcliffe	Abandoned at the end of the eighteenth century, when the church was moved closer to the village
Collingham Cross	Standing cross at Collingham	Cross	Collingham, Newark	On the West side of High Street
	Standing cross at Holme	Cross	Holme, Newark	140m North of The Old Hall
	Standing cross at North Muskham	Cross	North Muskham, Newark	300m North of Trent Farm
Beaumond Cross	Standing cross known as Beaumond Cross	Cross	Newark	Relocated to London Road Gardens from the south end of Carter Gate, a much weathered 15th century cross shaft repaired and ornamented in 1778, restored again in 1801.
Bottom Cross, Linby	Standing cross known as Bottom Cross	Cross	Linby	
Top Cross, Linby	Standing cross known as Top Cross	Cross	Linby	
Standing cross on Church Street, Mansfield Woodhouse	Standing cross on Church Street, Mansfield Woodhouse	Cross	Mansfield	
Village Green and Cross, Upper Broughton	Standing cross on Upper Broughton village green	Cross	Upper Broughton, Rushcliffe	
	Standing cross on Walkeringham village green	Cross	Walkeringham, Bassetlaw	
	Succession of rectilinear enclosures SW of Shelford Manor	Enclosure	Shelford and Newton, Rushcliffe	
	Thorpe in the Glebe medieval settlement	Settlement	Thorpe in the Glebe, Rushcliffe	Including church site and open field system
	Three round barrows on Laxton Common	Barrow	Laxton and Moorhouse, Newark	
	Timber circle	Henge	East Stoke, Newark	430m NE of Stoke Fields Farm
	Two moats and five fishponds at Top Green	Moated site	Sibthorpe, Rushcliffe	
	Wansley Hall manorial site	Building	Bagthorpe, Ashfield	Remains of medieval Hall which was built c.1200AD.
	West Bridge	Bridge	Clumber Park	
Earthworks of the former village	Whimpton Moor medieval village and moated site	Settlement	Ragnall, Bassetlaw	
	Wigthorpe medieval settlement and part of the open field system	Settlement	Carlton in Lindrick, Bassetlaw	Immediately North of Wigthorpe Farm
	Willoughby deserted medieval village	Settlement	Norwell, Newark	Post-medieval moated manor, church, six fishponds, ridge and furrow and hollow way
	Worksop Castle	Castle	Bassetlaw	Eleventh century motte castle and twelfth century shell keep castle
