= Aconbury Camp =

Hillfort in Herefordshire, England

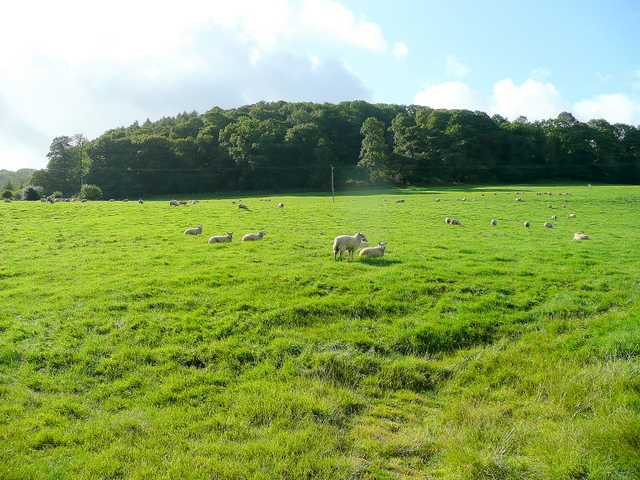
- Aconbury Hill viewed from the north

- Location within Herefordshire
- 51°59′37″N 2°43′28″W
- Type: Hillfort
- Periods: Iron Age
- Location: Near Hereford, Herefordshire
- OS grid reference: SO 505 330

Site notes
- Length: 500 metres (1,600 ft)
- Width: 137 metres (449 ft)
- Area: 7 hectares (17 acres)

Scheduled monument
- Designated: 26 November 1928
- Reference no.: 1001754

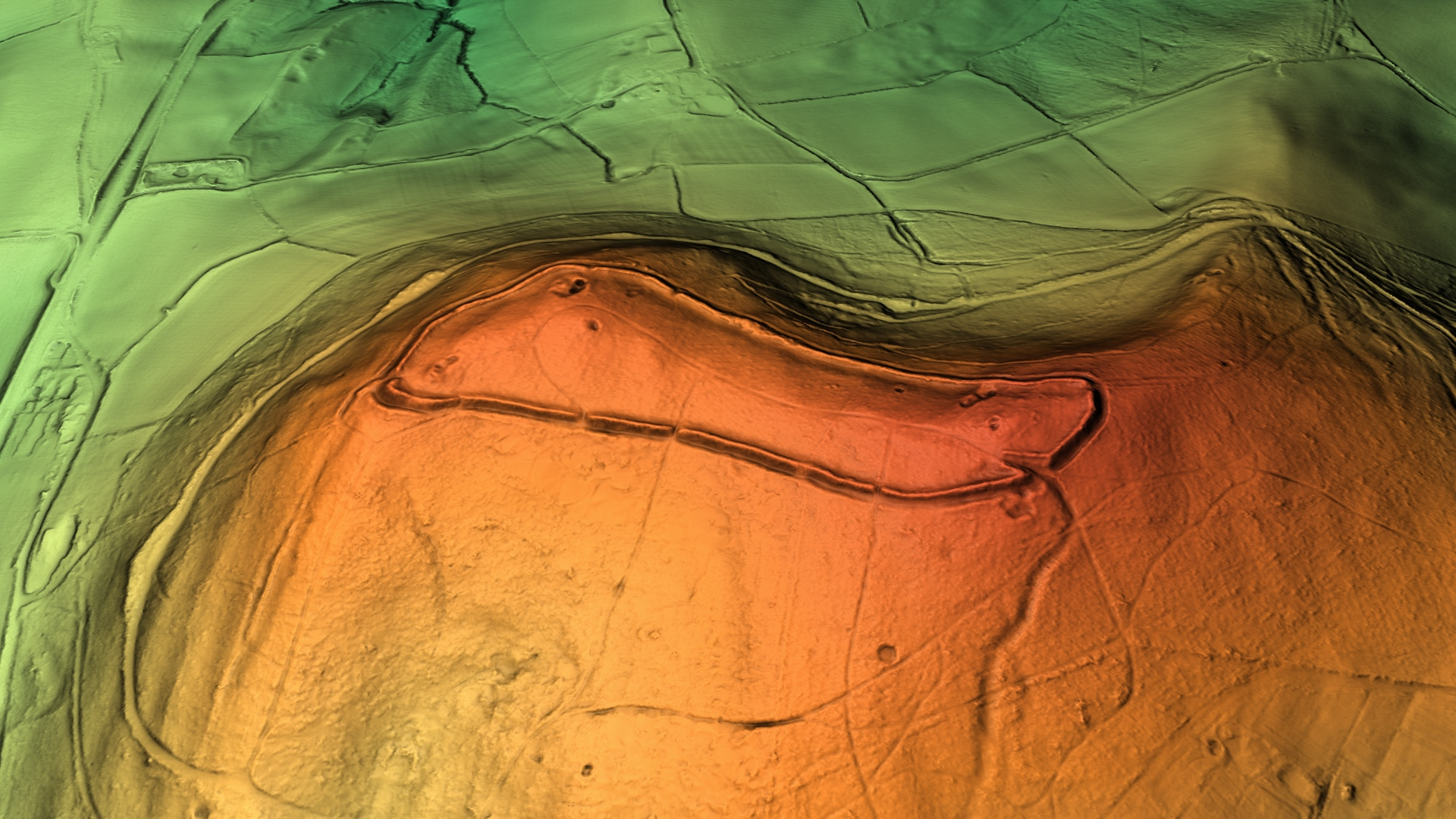
3D view of the digital terrain model

Aconbury Camp is an Iron Age hillfort on Aconbury Hill in Herefordshire, England, about 4 miles (6 km) south of Hereford, and near the village of Aconbury. It is a scheduled monument.

== Description ==
It has a single rampart, with external ditch, enclosing an area of about 7 hectares (17 acres); about 500 metres (1,600 ft) long west-to-east, and 137 metres (449 ft) wide. At the south-east and south-west corners there are inturned entrances. The rampart is about 3 metres (9.8 ft) above the interior, and up to 5.5 metres (18 ft) wide.

=== Excavation ===
The site was examined between 1948 and 1951; it was found that the ramparts seem to have internal revetments. Many pottery sherds, prehistoric and some Roman, were found. The material suggests occupation similar to that of the nearby hillforts Dinedor Camp and Sutton Walls.

=== Later history ===
During the English Civil War, the hill was occupied briefly in 1642 by a Royalist army under Lord Herbert; in 1645 it was occupied by a Scots army under the Earl of Leven who undertook an unsuccessful siege of Hereford in August that year.

== See also ==
- Hillforts in Britain
