= Giant's Grave, Cumbria =

Two standing stones in Cumbria, England

Giant's Grave
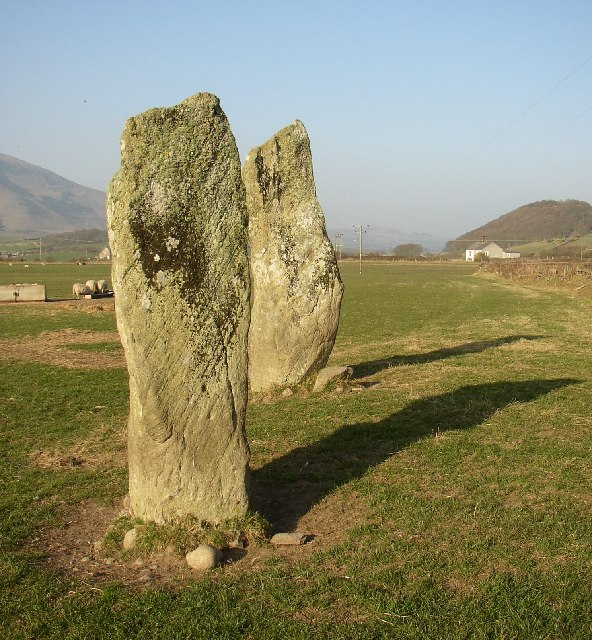

- Location in Copeland Borough Location in Cumbria
- 54.21833°N 3.32633°W
- Location: Cumbria

Site notes
- Architectural style: British pre-Roman Architecture

Giant's Grave (grid reference SD135810) are two standing stones at the foot of Black Combe in Cumbria, England. The smaller stone has three cup and ring marks whilst the taller has only one. The grave is accessible via the A595 road in a field near the level crossing.
