= Ancient monument (disambiguation) =

Ancient monument is a legal classification of historic sites in the United Kingdom.

Ancient monument may also refer to:

- Ancient monument (India) or Monuments of National Importance, classification of historic sites in India
  - Ancient monuments in Ujjain
- Ancient monument (Thailand)
- Ancient monuments of Java
- Ancient monuments acts (United Kingdom)
  - Ancient Monuments Protection Act 1882
  - Ancient Monuments Protection Act 1900
  - Ancient Monuments Protection Act 1910
  - Ancient Monuments Consolidation and Amendment Act 1913
  - Ancient Monuments and Archaeological Areas Act 1979

== See also ==
- Scheduled monument (UK)
- National monument (Ireland)
