= Charles Reed Peers =

English architect, archaeologist and preservationist

Sir Charles Reed Peers CBE FBA FRIBA FSA (22 September 1868 – 16 November 1952) was an English architect, archaeologist and preservationist. After a 10-year gap following the death of Lieutenant-General Augustus Pitt Rivers in 1900, Peers became England's second Inspector of Ancient Monuments from 1910 and was then the first Chief Inspector of Ancient Monuments from 1913 to 1933.

== Early life ==
Peers was born in Westerham in Kent, the eldest son of an Anglican clergyman. He was educated at Charterhouse School and studied classics at King's College, Cambridge from 1887 to 1891, graduating in the second class and then continuing his studies in Dresden and Berlin.

From 1893 to 1896 he worked as a pupil architect in the office of Thomas Graham Jackson. He spent a season with archaeologist George Somers Clarke in Egypt in 1896, and then returned to England to practise as an architect. He was editor of The Archaeological Journal from 1900 to 1903.

After visiting Egypt again in 1902, he became architectural editor of the Victoria History of the Counties of England in 1903, supervising the architects that described and drew plans of the buildings included in the volumes. Peers himself drew the plans and wrote the descriptions for a number of buildings, including Winchester Cathedral and St Albans Abbey.

== Inspector of Ancient Monuments ==
After a gap of 10 years following the death of Lieutenant General Augustus Pitt Rivers in 1900, Peers was appointed as Pitt Rivers' successor as Inspector of Ancient Monuments in 1910, in the Office of Works. Peers was a leading supporter of Lord Curzon's attempt to pass the legislation that became the Ancient Monuments Consolidation and Amendment Act 1913, spurred by the possibility that American investors would dismantle Tattershall Castle and remove it piece by piece to the United States. Peers became Chief Inspector of Ancient Monuments after the Act was passed. The 1913 Act consolidated the earlier Acts of 1882, 1900 and 1910. The 1913 Act established an Ancient Monuments Board, and it was also the first to require the owners of scheduled ancient monuments to apply for permission before altering or demolishing them. However, churches in ecclesiastical use and private houses were still excluded.

The 1913 Act also permitted the Ancient Monuments Board to issue preservation orders to take over nationally important monuments and maintain them at public expense. Peers made extensive use of these powers. Assisted by Ministry of Works architect Frank Baines, Peers developed a characteristic style of preservation of ruined medieval buildings. They steered a middle course between the minimal protective works espoused by the Society for the Protection of Ancient Buildings, and the extensive restoration and reconstruction undertaken at French historical sites by Eugène Viollet-le-Duc.

Peers preferred method was to turn a picturesque ruined building into an instructive archaeological site, keeping only those elements that would have been present in the medieval period. First, any necessary structural repairs had to be undertaken, but hidden from view. Undergrowth, ivy and later additions – which he termed "accretions" – were ruthlessly removed. The site would then be fenced, and the ruins surrounded by lawns of mown grass, aided by the relatively recent availability of the mechanised lawnmower. The works would be completed by making measured plans, taking photographs, and producing a guidebook, with simple labels distributed around the site. Some of the works authorised by Peers would be very extensive: tons of fallen masonry, earth and "accretions" were removed at Byland Abbey and Rievaulx Abbey. Sites under the control of the Ministry of Works became associated with the antiseptic presentation of masonry ruins and foundation set in neatly mown lawns, an aesthetic which remains associated with many sites under the care of English Heritage nearly a century later.

Rievaulx was taken into the guardianship of the Ministry of Works in 1917. Tons of soil – in places up to 16 feet (4.9 m) deep – were removed using a temporary railway to reveal the medieval ground plan of the site; precariously overhanging masonry was stabilised; and unsteady piers were reconstructed with reinforced concrete cores. Post-medieval farm buildings were removed. As Baines remarked in 1922: "in the twelve months which have transpired since the completion of the work, no trace of what has been undertaken is observable".

The work was undertaken at a great pace. There were 89 properties in Britain in state care in 1910; 22 were added in 1913, mostly ruined abbeys and castles; and 400 sites were preserved by Peers's death in 1952.

== Later life ==
Peers retired in 1933, soon after the enactment of the Ancient Monuments Act 1931, which provided compensation for owners of buildings that were compulsorily purchased, required 3 months' notice of works to a scheduled ancient monument, and made scheduling a Land Charge. The Town and Country Planning Act 1932 took up a suggestion from Peers so local councils could propose buildings for a preservation order (although the powers were only used 20 times between 1932 and 1947).

He became surveyor to Westminster Abbey in 1935, and held similar posts at York Minster and Durham Cathedral. He was architect-in-charge of the works to underpin Durham Castle to prevent it slipping off its rocky crag. He was also Seneschal of Canterbury Cathedral, an architectural advisor at Winchester Cathedral, sat on the Oxford diocesan committee, and carried out work for New College, Oxford.

== Honours ==
Peers became a Fellow of the Society of Antiquaries in 1901. He served as secretary of the society from 1908 until 1921, when he became its director; as president from 1929 and 1934; and he was awarded its gold medal in 1938. Peers became a Commander of the Order of the British Empire in the 1924 Birthday Honours, and was knighted in 1931.

He received honorary doctorates from Leeds University and London University, became a governor of Charterhouse, and was an honorary fellow of King's College, Cambridge. He was a commissioner of the Royal Commission on the Historical Monuments of England from 1921 and became a Fellow of the British Academy in 1926. He became a trustee of the London Museum in 1930, and a trustee of the British Museum in 1933. He was also a Fellow of the Royal Institute of British Architects, and received its gold medal in 1933. He was Antiquary to the Royal Academy from 1933 to 1952. He was elected President of the first session of the Congress of Prehistoric and Protohistoric Sciences in 1932, and became a Knight Commander of St Olav during its second session in Oslo in 1936.

== Private life ==
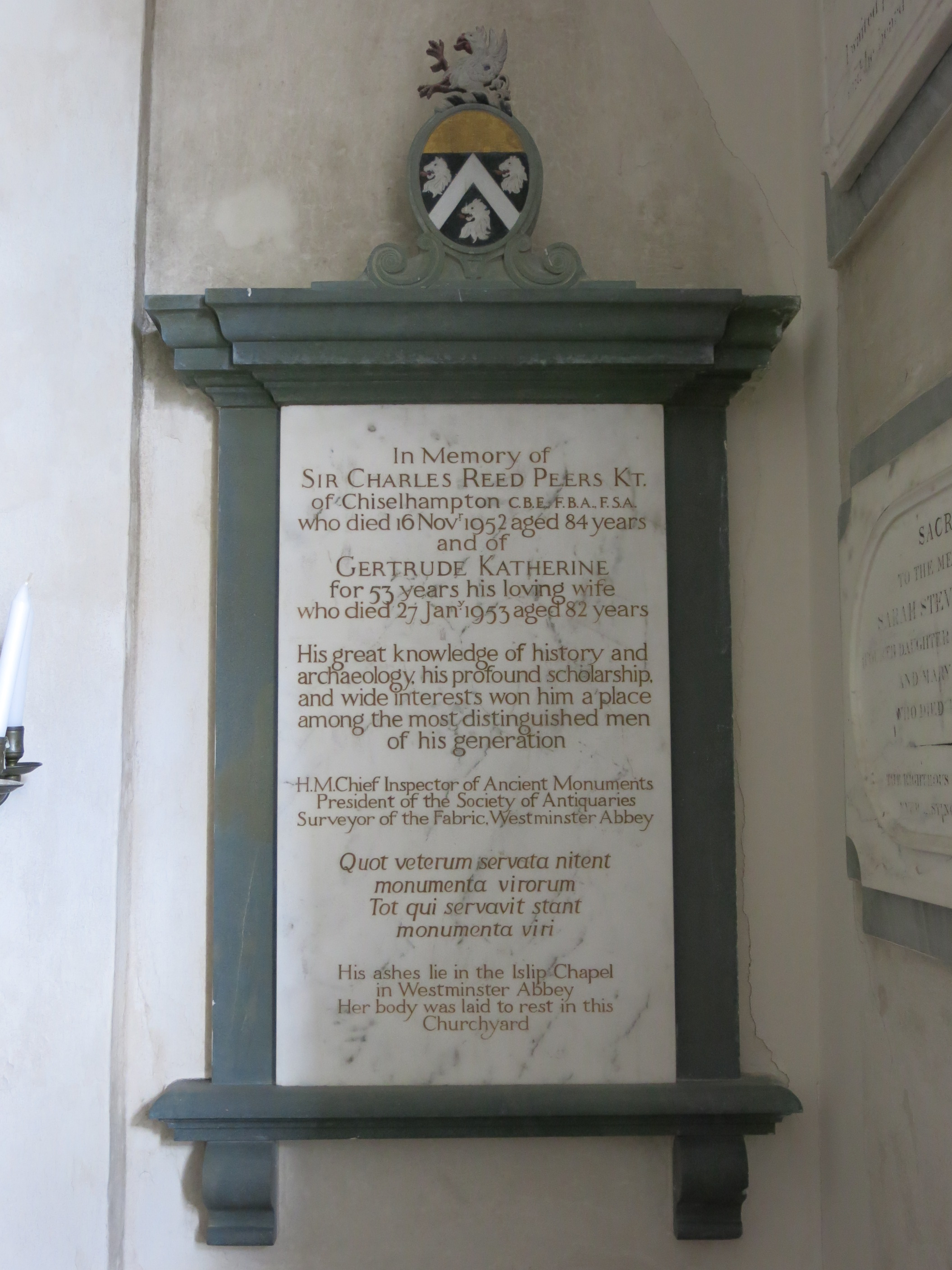
Memorial card of Sir Charles Reed Peers (d. 1952) and Gertrude Katherine Peers (d. 1953).

Peers married art historian Gertrude Katherine Shepherd on 13 April 1899. They had three sons together. They moved to 18th century Chiselhampton House in Oxfordshire in 1924, having inherited the property from Peers' father in 1921. Peers suffered from a long-term illness during the last seven years of his life, and died at a nursing home in Coulsdon. After a funeral service at Westminster Abbey, his ashes were interred in its Islip Chapel.

By the time of his death, Peers had set a standard for the excavation and public presentation of medieval military and monastic sites which endured for several decades. His work has been reassessed in more recent years. Although he is still praised for his contribution towards the protection and preservation of medieval ruins, he has been criticised for the extensive clearance of monastic sites which removed evidence of use and occupation after the medieval period. The clinical presentation of ruins set in lawns with herbaceous borders has also been criticised for removing natural context, and for eliminating the romanticism of overgrown, tumbledown, ivy-clad ruins.
