= Ancient Monuments Act 1931 =

Act of the Parliament of the United Kingdom

Ancient Monuments Act 1931 (Note: Section 17(1).)
- Act of Parliament
- Parliament of the United Kingdom
- Long title: An Act to amend the Law relating to ancient monuments.
- Citation: 21 & 22 Geo. 5. c. 16
- Territorial extent: England and Wales; Scotland; (Note: Section 17(4).)

Dates
- Royal assent: 11 June 1931
- Commencement: 11 June 1931 (Note: The Acts of Parliament (Commencement) Act 1793.)
- Repealed: England and Wales: 9 October 1981 (Note: The Ancient Monuments and Archaeological Areas Act 1979 (Commencement No. 2) Order 1981 (SI 1981/1300).); Scotland: 30 November 1981 (Note: The Ancient Monuments and Archaeological Areas Act 1979 (Commencement No. 3) Order 1981 (SI 1981/1466).)
Other legislation
Amends	Ancient Monuments Consolidation and Amendment Act 1913
Amended by	Town and Country Planning Act 1947; Town and Country Planning (Scotland) Act 1947
Repealed by	Ancient Monuments and Archaeological Areas Act 1979

Status: Repealed

Text of statute as originally enacted

The Ancient Monuments Act 1931 (21 & 22 Geo. 5. c. 16) was an act of the Parliament of the United Kingdom that aimed to improve the protection afforded to ancient monuments in Britain.

== Details ==
The Ancient Monuments Protection Act 1882 (45 & 46 Vict. c. 73) had begun the process of establishing legal protection for some of Britain's ancient monuments; these had all been prehistoric sites, such as ancient tumuli. The Ancient Monuments Protection Act 1900 (63 & 64 Vict. c. 34) had continued this process, empowering the government's Commissioners of Works and local county councils to protect a wider range of properties. In 1908 a royal commission concluded that there were gaps between these two pieces of legislation, and the Ancient Monuments Protection Act 1910 (10 Edw. 7 & 1 Geo. 5. c. 3). These were felt to be unwieldy, and the Ancient Monuments Consolidation and Amendment Act 1913 (3 & 4 Geo. 5. c. 32) repealed all three, replacing them with the new Ancient Monuments Board to oversee the protection of such monuments. Powers were given for the board, with parliamentary approval, to issue preservation orders and to protect the lands immediately around an ancient monument.

The 1931 act was passed to deal with gaps in this system. In particular, the new act extended the definition of an ancient monument to include a cave or an underground archaeological artefact; it also extended the powers of the state to manage development in the area around an ancient monument, allowing them to introduce preservation schemes to protect the wider neighbourhood.

== Subsequent developments ==
The whole act was repealed by section 64(3) of, and schedule 5 to, the Ancient Monuments and Archaeological Areas Act 1979, which came into force in England and Wales on 9 October 1981, and in Scotland on 30 November 1981.

== Bibliography ==
- Mynors, Charles. (2006) Listed Buildings, Conservation Areas and Monuments. London: Sweet and Maxwell. ISBN 978-0-421-75830-8.
