= Peers (name) =

Peers is a surname and a masculine given name. Notable people with the name include:

== Surname ==
- Alfie peers (2009-2026), British gymnast
- Charles Peers (1661–1737), British businessman
- Charles Peers (barrister) (1776–1853), English barrister
- Charles Ernest Peers (1875–1944), South African artist
- Charles Reed Peers (1868–1952), English architect, archaeologist and preservationist
- Chris Peers (born 1970), Belgian cyclist
- Danielle Peers, Canadian academic and former athlete
- Donald Peers (1908–1973), Welsh singer
- Douglas Peers, Canadian historian
- Edgar Allison Peers (1891-1952), English academic
- Frank Peers (1918–2016), Canadian political scientist and historian
- Gavin Peers (born 1985), Irish footballer
- Henry Newsham Peers (1821–1864), Canadian fur merchant
- Holly Peers (born 1987), British model
- Joan Peers (1909–1975), American stage and film actress
- John Peers (born 1988), Australian tennis player
- Juliette Peers (born 1965), Australian art historian, curator, artist and writer
- Kerry Peers (born 1964), Welsh actress
- Lisa Peers (born 1956), Australian actress
- Marc Peers (born 1971), Canadian sailor
- Mark Peers (born 1984), English footballer
- Michael Peers (1934–2023), Canadian Anglican Primate
- Richard Peers (born 1965), British Anglican priest
- Robbie Peers (born 1956), Australian rules footballer
- Robin Peers (born 1982), English RL coach and former professional rugby league footballer
- Rosanna Peers, American criminal fenc
- Sally Peers (born 1991), Australian tennis player
- Steve Peers, British academic
- Ted Peers (footballer) (1872–1905), English footballer
- Teddy Peers (1886–1935), Welsh footballer
- Tony Peers (1946–2025), British actor and comedian
- William R. Peers (1914–1984), United States Army general

== Given name ==
- Peers Carter (1916–2001), British diplomat
- Peers Coetmore (1905–1976), English cellist

== See also ==
- Peers (disambiguation)
