= Ted Peers =

Ted Peers may refer to:

- Teddy Peers (1886–1935), Wales international football goalkeeper
- Ted Peers (footballer) (1873–1905), English footballer
