= Government budget =

Projection of revenues and spending for a fiscal year

A government budget is a projection of the government's revenues and expenditure for a particular period, often referred to as a financial or fiscal year, which may or may not correspond with the calendar year. Government revenues mostly include taxes (e.g. inheritance tax, income tax, corporation tax, import taxes) while expenditures consist of government spending (e.g. healthcare, education, defense, infrastructure, social benefits). A government budget is prepared by the Central government or other political entity. In most parliamentary systems, the budget is presented to the legislature and often requires approval of the legislature. The government implements economic policy through this budget and realizes its program priorities. Once the budget is approved, the use of funds from individual chapters is in the hands of government ministries and other institutions. Revenues of the state budget consist mainly of taxes, customs duties, fees, and other revenues. State budget expenditures cover the activities of the state, which are either given by law or the constitution. The budget in itself does not appropriate funds for government programs, hence the need for additional legislative measures.

== History ==
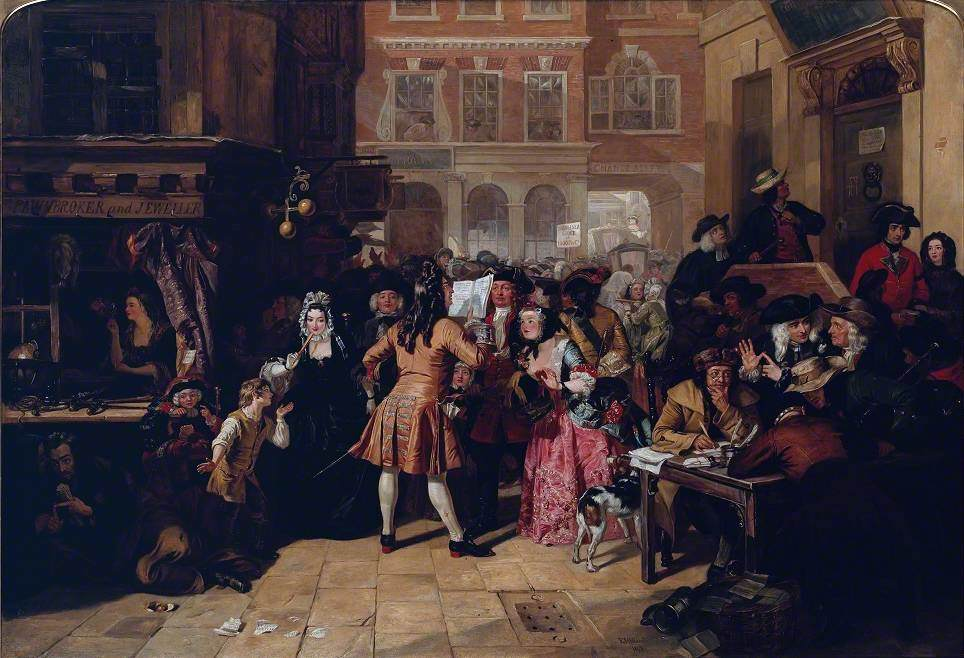
The financial crisis caused by the South Sea company led to the presentation of the government budget under Sir Robert Walpole. The South Sea Bubble by Edward Matthew Ward, 1847.

Credible budgets, which are defined as statutory fixed term (generally one year) budgets auditable by parliament, were first introduced in the Netherlands in 1572, England in 1689, France in 1830, Denmark, Piedmont, and Prussia in 1848, Portugal in 1851, Sweden in 1866, Austria in 1867, and Spain in 1876. Credible budgets had two main effects: 1. They made parliament more likely to approve new taxation, and 2. They enhanced wartime military spending and increased the chance of victory in war.

The practice of presenting budgets and fiscal policy to parliament was initiated by Sir Robert Walpole in his position as Chancellor of the Exchequer in an attempt to restore the confidence of the public after the chaos unleashed by the collapse of the South Sea Bubble in 1720. Thirteen years later, Walpole announced his fiscal plans to bring in an excise tax on the consumption of a variety of goods and services, such as wine and tobacco, and to lessen the taxation burden on the landed gentry. This provoked a wave of public outrage, including fierce denunciations from the Whig peer William Pulteney, who wrote a pamphlet entitled The budget opened, Or an answer to a pamphlet. Concerning the duties on wine and tobacco - the first time the word 'budget' was used in connection with the government's fiscal policies. The proposed Excise Bill was eventually rescinded.

The institution of the annual account of the budget evolved into practice during the first half of the 18th century and had become well established by the 1760s; George Grenville introduced the Stamp Act in his 1764 budget speech to the House of Commons of Great Britain.

== Modern government budget ==
=== Generation ===
The true government budget, the modern government budget, arose during the period of capitalist society and was gradually established during the struggle between the bourgeoisie and the feudal ruling class. As the productive forces of capitalism developed, the economic power of the bourgeoisie gradually grew, and the political demands for democracy became more and more vocal. In the early stages of its development, the budget aimed to establish the duties of the legislature, and after a long struggle with the monarchy, it finally gave the legislature control over taxation. After obtaining the taxation, the power to amend tax laws, and approve tax proposals, the legislature turned its attention to controlling expenditure. As a result, the legislature required an annual budget report, including a statement of expenditure and a statement of revenue. England was the first country in the world to establish a modern government budget. After the triumph of the bourgeois revolution in 1640, England, as a parliamentary monarchy, had all of its financial powers controlled by Parliament. The Bill of Rights 1689 reaffirmed that the royal government could not force anyone to pay taxes without the approval of Parliament for adoption, and also required that how taxes were to be spent and the items of budgetary expenditure be approved by Parliament, and that revenues and expenditures be allocated on an annual basis and that a plan of revenues and expenditures be made in advance and submitted to Parliament for approval and monitoring. In other capitalist countries, government budgets were created later, such as in France in 1817 and the United States in 1921. In short, the government budget system was historically established and developed as a way for the National Assembly to control and organize the financial activities of the government (the executive), with the aim of effective control of the executive by the legislature. The government budget is both a product of government administration and political democratization. The emergence of the capitalist mode of production and the high level of development of the commodity economy led to an expansion of the state's financial resources and a massive increase in both revenue and expenditure. The expansion of fiscal revenues and expenditures and the increase in government departments and personnel required the government to plan its funds, which gave rise to the concept of the government budget. The government budget is also a product of the democratization of modern politics. From the West, the emergence of the capitalist mode of production and the gradual economic power of the bourgeoisie led to increasing demands for political rights. The bourgeoisie demanded the complete separation of the state from the home and the control of government revenues and expenditures through parliament. To this end, the bourgeois theorists put forward the famous "principle of participation," which states that the people have the right not to recognize taxes and expenditures that have not been discussed yet and adopted by the representatives of the people and to refuse to pay them. Based on this principle, the bourgeoisie united with the workers in a long struggle against the feudal aristocracy, which was finally compromised. In 1689, a constitutional monarchy was established in England, with a bourgeoisie-dominated House of Commons, which confirmed the status of the principle of participation: firstly, no taxes could be levied without the consent of Parliament; secondly, the government established a budget, which could only be implemented with the approval of Parliament, etc. By gaining the right to tax and budget, the bourgeoisie finally entered the political arena.

=== Significance ===
The institutional framework of public finance is the government budget or public budget. The budgetary system is a system of popular approval and oversight of the state's financial activities. The history of constitutional politics can be described as the history of the establishment of the modern budgetary system. The budget is, in economic and technical terms, a schedule for comparing government revenues and expenditures, a mechanism for allocating resources in modern economic society. The budget determined through the political process, determines, first of all, the proportion and structure of the allocation of the resources of society as a whole between the various sectors, and therefore the scale and direction of the financial allocation of resources. In essence, the budget is a mechanism by which the taxpayers and their representative bodies control the financial activities of the government, a distribution of public power between different subjects as a means of allocating resources, a structure of checks and balances and a democratic political process. The taxpayers, who have the right to independent assets, are responsible for the financial provision of the State, which necessarily requires control of the State's finances and a legal procedure to ensure that government revenues and expenditures do not deviate from the interests of the taxpayers. In conclusion, the government budget, as a rule of the allocation of resources by public power, is a system of control and organisation of the operation of public finances, and is the basis of representative politics, the core of whose values is democratic finance.

== Types of budget ==
Budgets are of the following types:

- National budget: a budget that the national government creates for the entire nation.
- State budget: In federal systems, individual states also prepare their own budgets.
- Plan budget: It is a document showing the budgetary provisions for important projects, programmes and schemes included in the central plan of the country. It also shows the central assistance to states and union territories.
- Performance budget: The central ministries and departments dealing with development activities prepare performance budgets, which are circulated to members of parliament. These performance budgets present the main projects, programmes and activities of the government in the light of specific objectives and previous years' budgets and achievements.
- Supplementary budget: This budget forecasts the budget of the coming year with regards to revenue and expenditure.
- Zero-based budget: This is defined as the budgetary process which requires each ministry/department to justify its entire budget in detail. It is a system of budget in which all government expenditures must be justified for each new period.

== Elements ==
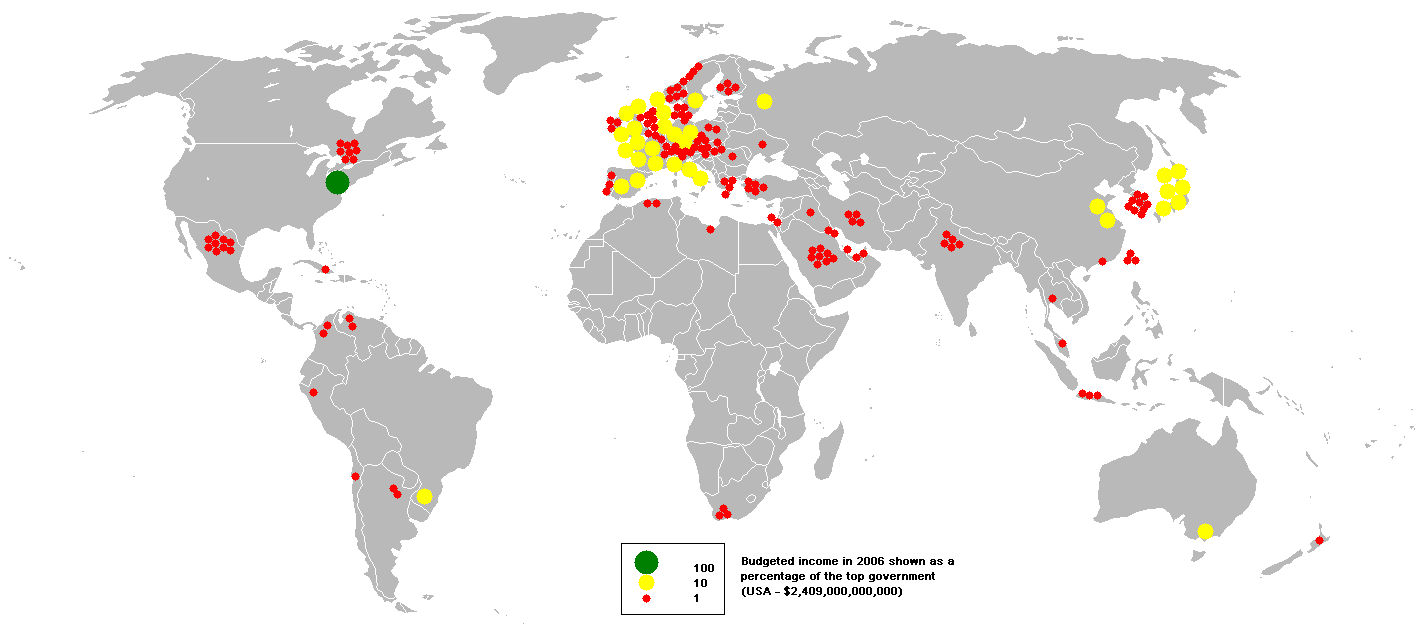
Budgeted revenues of governments in 2006

The two basic elements of any budget are the revenues and expenses. In the case of the government, revenues are derived primarily from tax. Government expenses include spending on current goods and services, which economists call government consumption; government investment expenditures such as infrastructure investment or research expenditure; and transfer payments like unemployment or retirement benefits.

=== Government revenue ===
Government revenue is the income of the government earned by redistribution of the social products. It is the financial resource necessary for the functionality of the government. The contents of government revenue have undergone multiple changes. Today, it mostly consists of the following:

1. Tax revenues: Government income, gained by levying various types of taxes. Taxes typically make the majority of income for most governments. We refer to taxes such as income tax, sales tax, property tax, or corporate tax.
2. Fees and charges: Fees for additional services provided by the government, which can be referred to as public goods. Such fees include fee on sewage treatment, charges for education, charges for issuing permits or even fines for violating laws.
3. Loans: Government may borrow money by issuing bonds and other securities, increasing its debt.
4. Grants and aid: Grants are given to the government by international organizations to fund specific projects. Aid may come from private entities, other governments or international organizations.
5. Sale of assets: Government may sell public assets such as land, buildings or equipment, in order to generate additional income. Such actions can be referred to as privatization.

=== Government expenditures ===
Government expenditures refer to how money raised by the government is allocated in order to support a wide range of causes, meet the needs of its citizens and ensure economic growth through various programs. The expenditures can be divided by the Classification of Functions of Government (COFOG):

1. General public services: Funding of services provided for the entire population. Some examples are spendings on executive and legislative organs of the government, fiscal actions, interest expense on government debt, international economic aid, and funding of science.
2. Defense: Funds allocated by the government for military and civil defense or foreign aid and research.
3. Public order and safety: Services provided by the government, to ensure public safety. Unlike defense spending, it concerns only the protection of the public, such as police or fire-protection services.
4. Economic affairs: Funds allocated to different industries of the economy, to ensure economic growth.
5. Environmental protection: Governments may spend money on environmental protection, which includes initiatives to tackle climate change, improve the quality of the air and water, and conserve wildlife.
6. Housing and community amenities: This type of expenditures refers to public goods such as residential development, water supply or street lighting.
7. Health: These spendings refer to support of healthcare, including prevention and research.
8. Recreation, culture and religion: Funds allocated to provide recreational goods and services and for cultural services. Additionally includes spending on religious activities.
9. Education: Funds allocated in order to support the state’s education system. Includes expenses for all levels of education and other types of education.
10. Social protection: Additional services offered to specific parts of the population, in an attempt to achieve equity and provide additional social security. These expenditures mostly consist of pensions and unemployment benefits.

=== Special consideration ===
Government budgets have economic, political and technical basis. Unlike a pure economic budget, they are not entirely designed to allocate scarce resources for the best economic use. Government budgets also have a political basis wherein different interests push and pull in an attempt to obtain benefits and avoid burdens. The technical element is the forecast of the likely levels of revenues and expenses.

== Classification ==
Government budget can be of three types:

- Balanced budget: when government receipts are equal to the government expenditure.
- Deficit budget: when government expenditure exceeds government receipts. A deficit can be of 3 types: revenue, fiscal and primary deficit. Governments usually finance this deficit by either borrowing from the private sectors of their countries or other countries' governments and international institutions. The accumulation of these borrowings will create government debt, also referred to as national debt and public debt.
- Surplus budget: when government receipts exceed expenditure.

Despite the straightforward definitions of the states into which the government budget can fall, there are some debates over the issues measurements – such as inflation correction, the inclusion of business cycles, etc. – and how much the public budget, or more specifically debt, should influence public and fiscal policy-making as well as being a correct indicator of the impacts.

A budget can be classified according to function or according to flexibility.

== Approaches to government budgeting ==
Line-item budgeting: In line-item budgeting (also known as the traditional budgeting), the government budget is divided into a list of items which the government plans to spend its money on. The expenditures often exceed the budget, but the majority of the spendings follows the budget plan. This approach was developed in the 1920s in order to prevent corruption.

Incrementalism: This approach focuses on making small changes from year to year. The government forms a budget for the new fiscal year by taking the budget from the previous fiscal year as a base and makes only small changes to it.

Top-down approach: The central financial authority (e.g. the Ministry of finance) sets boundaries to the budget and the government completes it. This approach originated in the 1990s as an attempt to control the increasing fiscal deficits.

Another design choice is whether unused appropriations expire or can be carried forward. A principal-agent model of organizational budgeting finds that budget roll-over can reduce wasteful year-end spending, but that partial roll-over may sometimes be preferable to full roll-over.

== Division of responsibilities ==
A simple examination of expenditures does not do justice to the complex relationships between the federal government and the states and localities. In some cases, the federal government pays for a program and gives broad discretion to the states as to how to carry out the mandate. In other cases, the federal government essentially dictates all the terms, and the states simply administer the program.

Government budget is a subject of importance for a variety of reasons:

1. Planned approach to the government's activities
2. Integrated approach to fiscal operations
3. Affecting economic activities
4. Instrument of economics policy
5. Index of government's functioning
6. Public accountability
7. Allocation of resources
8. Elimination of poverty
9. Reduce inequality in distribution of income
10. Tax and non-tax receipt

== See also ==
- Budget crisis
- List of countries by government budget
- List of sovereign states by tax revenue to GDP ratio
- Unfunded mandate
