= Ancient Monuments and Archaeological Areas Act 1979 =

Act of the Parliament of the United Kingdom

Ancient Monuments and Archaeological Areas Act 1979 (Note: Section 66(1).)
- Act of Parliament
- Parliament of the United Kingdom
- Long title: An Act to consolidate and amend the law relating to ancient monuments; to make provision for the investigation, preservation and recording of matters of archaeological or historical interest and (in connection therewith) for the regulation of operations or activities affecting such matters; to provide for the recovery of grants under section 10 of the Town and Country Planning (Amendment) Act 1972 or under section 4 of the Historic Buildings and Ancient Monuments Act 1953 in certain circumstances; and to provide for grants by the Secretary of State to the Architectural Heritage Fund.
- Citation: 1979 c. 46
- Territorial extent: England and Wales; Scotland; (Note: Section 66(3).)

Dates
- Royal assent: 4 April 1979
- Commencement: various (Note: Section 66(2).)
Other legislation
Amends	Electricity (Supply) Act 1926; Coast Protection Act 1949; Coal Mining (Subsidence) Act 1957; Flood Prevention (Scotland) Act 1961; Faculty Jurisdiction Measure 1964; Town and Country Planning (Amendment) Act 1972; Local Government Act 1972; Finance Act 1975; Land Drainage Act 1976; Scotland Act 1978; See § Repealed enactments
Repeals/revokes	See § Repealed enactments
Amended by	Statute Law (Repeals) Act 1981; Acquisition of Land Act 1981; National Heritage Act 1983; Inheritance Tax Act 1984; Airports Act 1986; Gas Act 1986; Coal Industry Act 1987; Water Act 1989; Planning (Consequential Provisions) Act 1990; Water Consolidation (Consequential Provisions) Act 1991; Statute Law (Repeals) Act 1993; Coal Industry Act 1994; Environment Act 1995; Treasure Act 1996; Planning (Consequential Provisions) (Scotland) Act 1997; Abolition of Feudal Tenure etc. (Scotland) Act 2000; National Heritage Act 2002; Church of England (Miscellaneous Provisions) Measure 2006; Planning Act 2008; Postal Services Act 2011; Charities Act 2011; Historic Environment Scotland Act 2014; Sentencing Act 2020; Historic Environment (Wales) Act 2023

Status: Amended

Text of statute as originally enacted

Revised text of statute as amended

Text of the Ancient Monuments and Archaeological Areas Act 1979 as in force today (including any amendments) within the United Kingdom, from legislation.gov.uk.

The Ancient Monuments and Archaeological Areas Act 1979 (c. 46) (abbreviated AMAAA) is an act of the Parliament of the United Kingdom, the latest in a series of Ancient Monument Acts legislating to protect the archaeological heritage of England, Wales, and Scotland. Northern Ireland has its own legislation.

The law is administered in England by Historic England and the Department for Culture, Media and Sport, in Scotland by Historic Environment Scotland and formerly by Cadw in Wales.

== Provisions ==
=== Ancient monuments ===
Section 61(12) defines sites that warrant protection due to their being of national importance as 'ancient monuments'. These can be either scheduled monuments or "any other monument which in the opinion of the Secretary of State is of public interest by reason of the historic, architectural, traditional, artistic or archaeological interest attaching to it". If an ancient monument is scheduled then it gains additional legal protection.

A monument is defined as:

any building, structure or work above or below the surface of the land, any cave or excavation; any site comprising the remains of any such building, structure or work or any cave or excavation; and any site comprising or comprising the remains of any vehicle, vessel or aircraft or other movable structure or part thereof...

— Section 61 (7)

Damage to a scheduled monument is a criminal offence and any works taking place within one require scheduled monument consent from the Secretary of State. Those sentenced under these provisions can receive a substantial fine or a term of imprisonment or both.

The Act also provides for taking ancient monuments into the care of the Secretary of State – the concept of 'guardianship' where an ancient monument remains in private ownership but the monument is cared for and (usually) opened to the public by the relevant national heritage body.

=== Areas of archaeological importance ===
The Act (in Part II) also introduced the concept of areas of archaeological importance (AAI), city centres of historic significance which receive limited further protection by forcing developers to permit archaeological access prior to building work starting. As of 2004 only five city centres, all in England, have been designated AAIs (Canterbury, Chester, Exeter, Hereford and York). Part II of the Act was never commenced in Scotland.

As the provisions in AAIs are limited compared with the requirements that can be made of developers through the NPPF, and formerly its predecessors in PPS5 and PPG16, AAIs have fallen out of use.

== Replacement in Wales ==
The act no longer has effect in Wales, its provisions having been repealed and replaced there by the Historic Environment (Wales) Act 2023.

== Repealed enactments ==
Section 64(3) of the act repealed 21 enactments, listed in schedule 5 to the act.

Enactments repealed by section 64(3)
Citation	Short title	Extent of repeal
45 & 46 Vict. c. 73	Ancient Monuments Protection Act 1882	The Schedule.
3 & 4 Geo. 5. c. 32	Ancient Monuments Consolidation and Amendment Act 1913	The whole act.
21 & 22 Geo. 5. c. 16	Ancient Monuments Act 1931	The whole act.
9 & 10 Geo. 6. c. 49	Acquisition of Land (Authorisation Procedure) Act 1946	In section 1(2), paragraph (c) and the word "or" immediately preceding it.
9 & 10 Geo. 6. c. 49	Acquisition of Land (Authorisation Procedure) Act 1946	In section 8(1), the definition of "ancient monument".
9 & 10 Geo. 6. c. 49	Acquisition of Land (Authorisation Procedure) Act 1946	In Schedule 1, paragraph 12.
10 & 11 Geo. 6. c. 42	Acquisition of Land (Authorisation Procedure) (Scotland) Act 1947	In section 1(2), paragraph (c) and the word "or" immediately preceding it.
10 & 11 Geo. 6. c. 42	Acquisition of Land (Authorisation Procedure) (Scotland) Act 1947	In section 7(1), the definition of "ancient monument".
10 & 11 Geo. 6. c. 42	Acquisition of Land (Authorisation Procedure) (Scotland) Act 1947	In Schedule 1, paragraph 12.
1 & 2 Eliz. 2. c. 49	Historic Buildings and Ancient Monuments Act 1953	Parts II and III.
1 & 2 Eliz. 2. c. 49	Historic Buildings and Ancient Monuments Act 1953	Section 20.
1 & 2 Eliz. 2. c. 49	Historic Buildings and Ancient Monuments Act 1953	Section 22(2).
1 & 2 Eliz. 2. c. 49	Historic Buildings and Ancient Monuments Act 1953	The Schedule.
6 & 7 Eliz. 2. c. 30	Land Powers (Defence) Act 1958	In section 6(4)(b), the words from "or which" to "1953".
7 & 8 Eliz. 2. c. 24	Building (Scotland) Act 1959	In section 17(2), paragraph (d) and the words "or, as the case may be, the said Act of 1953".
1966 c. 4	Mines (Working Facilities and Support) Act 1966	In section 7(8), the words from "or Part II" to "1953".
1967 c. 9	General Rate Act 1967	In paragraph 2(d) of Schedule 1, the words from "is the" to "or".
1967 c. 80	Criminal Justice Act 1967	In Schedule 3, the entries relating to the Ancient Monuments Consolidation and Amendment Act 1913 and the Ancient Monuments Act 1931.
1968 c. 72	Town and Country Planning Act 1968	Section 59.
1969 c. 30	Town and Country Planning (Scotland) Act 1969	Section 59.
1971 c. 78	Town and Country Planning Act 1971	In Schedule 23, the entry relating to the Town and Country Planning Act 1968.
1972 c. 43	Field Monuments Act 1972	The whole act.
1972 c. 52	Town and Country Planning (Scotland) Act 1972	In Schedule 21, the entry relating to the Town and Country Planning (Scotland) Act 1969.
1973 c. 65	Local Government (Scotland) Act 1973	In Schedule 23, paragraph 1.
1974 c. 32	Town and Country Amenities Act 1974	In section 13(1) paragraph (c) and the word "and" immediately preceding that paragraph.
1976 c. 57	Local Government (Miscellaneous Provisions) Act 1976	In Schedule 1, paragraph 5.
1976 c. 75	Development of Rural Wales Act 1976	In Schedule 4, paragraph 5.
1978 c. 52	Wales Act 1978	In Schedule 11, paragraph 2.

== See also ==
- Ancient Monuments Protection Act 1882
- Ancient Monuments Protection Act 1900
- Ancient Monuments Protection Act 1910
- Ancient Monuments Consolidation and Amendment Act 1913
- Ancient Monuments Act 1931
