= Peer =

Peer or peeress may refer to:

== Sociology ==
- Peer, an equal in age, education or social class; see Peer group
- Peer, a member of the peerage

== Computing ==
- Peer, one of several functional units in the same layer of a network; See Peer group (computer networking)
  - Peer (networking), a computer system connected to others on a network
  - Peer, a computer network in a voluntary interconnection of administratively separate Internet networks in peering

== Organizations ==
- Partnership for European Environmental Research, a network of seven European environmental research centres
- Public Employees for Environmental Responsibility, an organization of anonymous public employees promoting environmental responsibility

== People ==
- Peer (name), a list of people with the given name and the surname

== Other uses ==
- the title character of Peer Gynt, a play by Henrik Ibsen
- Peer, Belgium, a municipality and city

== See also ==
- Pe'er, a list of people with the given name or surname
- Peers (disambiguation), a surname and place name
- Pir (Sufism) (also spelled Peer)
- Pier (disambiguation)
- Pir (disambiguation)
