= Peer (name) =

Peer is a given name and a surname. Notable people with the name include:

== Given name ==
- Peer Åström (born 1972), Swedish musician and songwriter
- Peer Augustinski (1940–2014), German actor
- Peer Baierlein (born 1972), German musician and composer
- Peer Bork (1963–2026), German bioinformatician
- Peer Borsky (born 1990), Swiss fencer
- Peer Fischer (born 1972), British robotics researcher
- Peer Guldbrandsen (1912–1996), Danish screenwriter and actor
- Peer Hultberg (1935–2007), Danish author and psychoanalyst
- Peer Mohammed Hussain (born 1942), Indian politician; former minister of Jammu and Kashmir
- Peer Joechel (born 1967), German bobsledder
- Peer Khizer Hayat Shah Khagga (born 1984), Pakistani politician
- Peer Ali Khan (1812–1857), Indian revolutionary
- Peer Kluge (born 1980), German footballer
- Peer Koopmeiners (born 2000), Dutch footballer
- Peer Krom (1898–1965), Dutch footballer
- Peer Kusmagk (born 1975), German actor and television host
- Peer Lilienthal (born 1979), German politician
- Peer Lisdorf (born 1967), Danish footballer and coach
- Peer Lorenzen (born 1944), Danish judge
- Peer Mascini (1941–2019), Dutch actor and writer
- Peer Moberg (born 1971), Norwegian sailor
- Peer Nielsen (born 1942), Danish canoeist
- Peer Pedersen, American film producer
- Peer Portner (1940–2009), British cardiologist
- Peer Posipal (born 1962), German footballer
- Peer Qvam (1911–1977), Norwegian architect
- Peer Raben (1940–2007), German composer, director and actor
- Peer M. Schatz (born 1965), Swiss businessman
- Peer Schmidt (1926–2010), German actor
- Peer de Silva (1917–1978), American intelligence officer
- Peer Smed (1878–1943), Danish-American silversmith and metalworker
- Peer Steinbrück (born 1947), German politician
- Peer Zumbansen (born 1966), German legal academic

== Surname ==
- Aadil Manzoor Peer (born 1997), Indian ice stock sport athlete
- Asif Peer, Pakistani businessperson
- Basharat Peer (born 1977), Kashmiri-American journalist and author
- Berry van Peer (born 1996), Dutch darts player
- Bert Peer (1910–1992), Canadian ice hockey player
- Beverly Peer (1912–1997), American jazz musician
- Dan Peer (born 1972), Israeli researcher
- Dean Peer (born 1969), English footballer
- Elizabeth Peer (1936–1984), American journalist
- Fawzia Peer, South African politician
- Franziska Peer (born 1987), Austrian sport shooter
- Heinrich Peer (1867–1927), Austrian actor
- Josef Peer (1864–1925), Governor of Liechtenstein from 1920 to 1921
- Leta Peer (1964–2012), Swiss artist
- Oscar Peer (1928–2013), Swiss novelist, playwright and philologist
- Rafi Peer (1898–1974), Pakistani actor
- Ralph Peer (1892–1960), American talent scout and recording engineer
- Stephen Peer (1840–1887), American tightrope walker
- William Peer (died 1713), British actor
- Willie van Peer (born 1947), Belgian literary scholar

== See also ==
- Peer (disambiguation)
