= Peers =

Peers may refer to:

== People ==
- Peers (name), a list of people with the surname and name

== Places ==
- Peers, Alberta, a hamlet in Alberta, Canada
- Peers, Missouri, a community in the United States

== See also ==
- Peer (disambiguation)
- Peer group
- Pears (disambiguation)
- Peerage
- Chamber of Peers (disambiguation)
- Piers (disambiguation)
