= Peerage (disambiguation) =

A peerage is a legal system comprising hereditary titles in various European countries.

Peerage may also refer to:

== Publications ==
- Burke's Peerage, publishes guides to the royal and titled families of the United Kingdom and many other countries
- Debrett's Peerage and Baronetage, a book and website with a short history of the family of each titleholder
- The Complete Peerage, a work on the titled aristocracy of the United Kingdom and, later, the UK and Ireland
- The Scots Peerage, a nine-volume series of the Scottish nobility

== Other uses ==
- Peerage Act 1963, allowing women peers and Scottish hereditary peers to sit in the House of Lords, and newly inherited hereditary peerages to be "disclaimed"

== See also ==
- Peer (disambiguation)
