= William Peer =

British actor (died 1713)

- Occupation: Actor

William Peer (died June 1713) was a British actor.

== Biography ==
Peer owes the survival of his name to a humorous mention of his career by Steele in the ‘Guardian,’ No. 82. He is declared to have been an actor at the Restoration, and to have taken ‘his theatrical degree under Betterton, Kynaston, and Harris.’ No mention of him is traceable in early theatrical records, and Genest only quotes what is said by Steele. He is said to have ‘distinguished himself particularly in two characters, which no man ever could touch but himself.’ One was the speaker of the prologue to the play introduced into ‘Hamlet.’ This preface he spoke ‘with such an air as represented that he was an actor, and with such an inferior manner as only acting an actor, as made the others on the stage appear real great persons, and not representatives. This was a nicety in acting that none but the most subtle player could so much as conceive.’ His delivery of the three lines assigned him won universal applause. His second part was the Apothecary in the ‘Caius Marius’ of Otway, an adaptation of ‘Romeo and Juliet,’ first played at Dorset Garden in 1680. When Marius demanded the poison ‘Peer at length consented in the most lamentable tone imaginable, delivered the poison like a man reduced to the drinking of it himself, and said:

My poverty, but not my will consents; Take this and drink it off, the work is done.’

Steele continues: ‘It was an odd excellence, and a very particular circumstance this of Peer's, that his whole action of life depended upon speaking five lines better than any man else in the world.’ No other parts were apparently assigned him, and the management of the Theatre Royal (Drury Lane) gave him the post of property man. The easy circumstances thus induced made him grow fat and so disqualify himself for his theatrical parts. This, it is hinted, shortened his life, which closed near his seventieth year, presumably about June 1713. Steele then gives a list of the properties Peer left behind him, including items such as 8d. for ‘pomatum and vermilion to grease the face of the stuttering cook, 3d. for blood in Macbeth, 8d. for raisins and almonds for a witch's banquet,’ &c.
