= Glebe Stone Circles =

- Ciorcal Liag na Gléibe (Irish)
- Nymphsfield Stone Circles; Moy Tura Conga
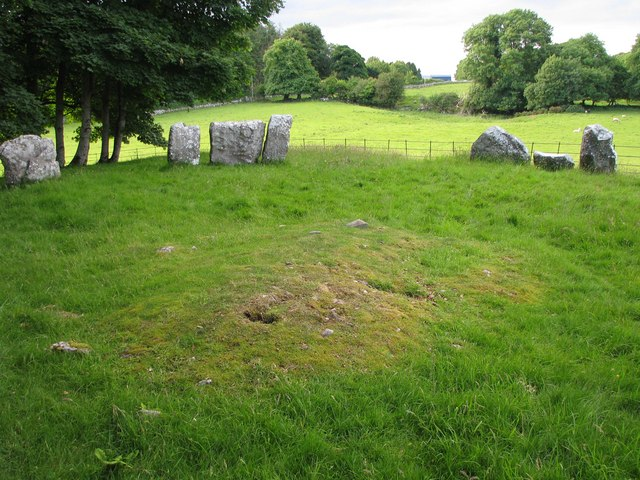

- Location within Ireland
- 53.548511°N 9.263524°W
- Type: stone circles
- Location: Glebe, Cong, County Mayo, Ireland

History
- Built: c. 2500–500 BC

Site notes
- Elevation: 28 m (92 ft)

National monument of Ireland
- Official name: Glebe Stone Circles
- Reference no.: 146

Glebe Stone Circles are standing stones and National Monument located in County Mayo, Ireland.

== Location ==
Glebe Standing Stones are located about 1.6 km (1 mile) east-northeast of Cong.

== History ==
The circles were first noted by Edward Lhuyd on his tour of Ireland in 1699; William Stukeley later reproduced Lhuyd's unpublished drawings.

William Wilde connected them to the mythical Battle of Moytura:

Before proceeding with the narrative, we must here conduct our readers to the existing Danann monuments that accumulate in the fields opposite the glebe of Nymphsfield, to a portion of which local tradition has assigned the name of Cath na bPunnán, "the battle of the sheaves." There are here five very remarkable stone circles still remaining within the compass of a quarter of a square mile, and there are traces of others. The following examples are highly illustrative of these remarkable monuments. That figured above consists of nineteen flat flagstones placed in a circle, each inclining outwards, perfectly smooth on the outside, but grooved and hollowed on their internal faces, which were evidently those originally exposed to the action of air or water. A considerable portion of this circle has been removed and its interior, which is now planted, is fifty-four feet in diameter. Some of these stones are five feet over ground, are four feet wide, and eight or ten inches thick. At the south-west corner of the same field, opposite the glebe there is another circle, of which the subjoined is a graphic representation. It consists of a series of standing stones, and is one hundred and fifty-two feet in diameter. Within and around this and the adjoining fields, to the south and east, several perfect circles still exist, and the sites of others can still be traced within the confines of Cath na bPunnán; so that here was evidently the stronghold of one of the contending armies.

== Description ==
There are four circles in a variety of styles.

=== Glebe (North) ===
About 16 m (52 ft) in diameter, 23 stones remain, up to 1.2 m (3 ft 11 in) in height with cup and ring marks. The monument was later landscaped as a tree ring, and some stones have been disturbed by tree roots.

=== Nymphsfield 1 (West) ===
About 10 m (33 ft) in diameter, the smallest circle.

=== Tonaleeaun (East) ===
An embanked recumbent stone circle with an orthostat at the west end.

=== Nymphsfield 2 (South) ===
10 m (33 ft) in diameter with 19 stones.
