= Pe'er =

Pe'er is a given name and a surname. It may refer to:

- Dana Pe'er (born 1971), biologist
- Daniel Pe'er (1943–2017), Israeli television host and newsreader
- Shahar Pe'er (born 1987), Israeli tennis player
- Pe'er Tasi (born 1984), Israeli singer and songwriter
- Pe'er Visner (born 1957), Israeli politician
- Aviva Pe'er, Israeli beauty queen
