= Peer group (computer networking) =

Functional units in same network layer

In computer networking, a peer group is a group of functional units in the same layer (see e.g. OSI model) of a network, by analogy with peer group.

== See also ==
- Peer-to-peer (P2P) networking, a specific type of networking relying on basically equal end hosts rather than on a hierarchy of devices.
