= Ancient monument =

Prehistoric or early historical structure or site worthy of preservation

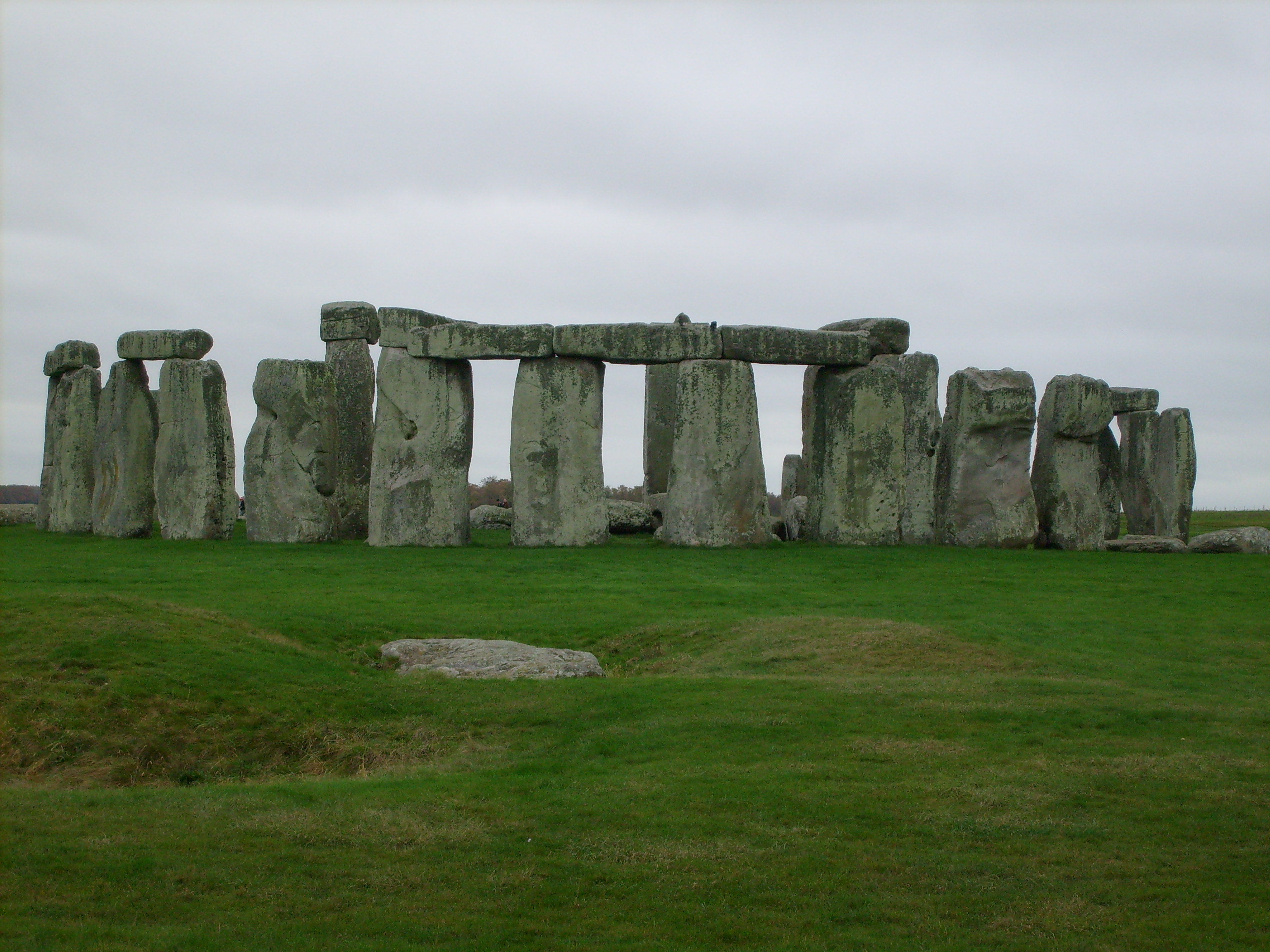
Stonehenge is one of the most famous prehistoric monuments.

An ancient monument is an early human-made structure or work of architecture. Ancient monuments include megaliths, temples, palaces, castles, pyramids, tombs and sculptural monuments. They are studied and preserved as part of the archaeological and cultural heritage of past societies, and some have also become symbols of national identity.

The protection of ancient monuments has been closely connected with the development of archaeology and historic preservation. In the United Kingdom, legislation from the Ancient Monuments Protection Act 1882 to the Ancient Monuments and Archaeological Areas Act 1979 introduced and expanded legal protections for such sites. Modern conservation can include physical planning, zoning, preventive maintenance and measures to limit environmental damage.

Ancient monuments are also destinations for heritage tourism. Religious, patriotic and archaeological tourism can centre on historic or sacred sites, while the preservation and management of these places has become an important part of archaeological work.

== Historical significance and cultural heritage ==
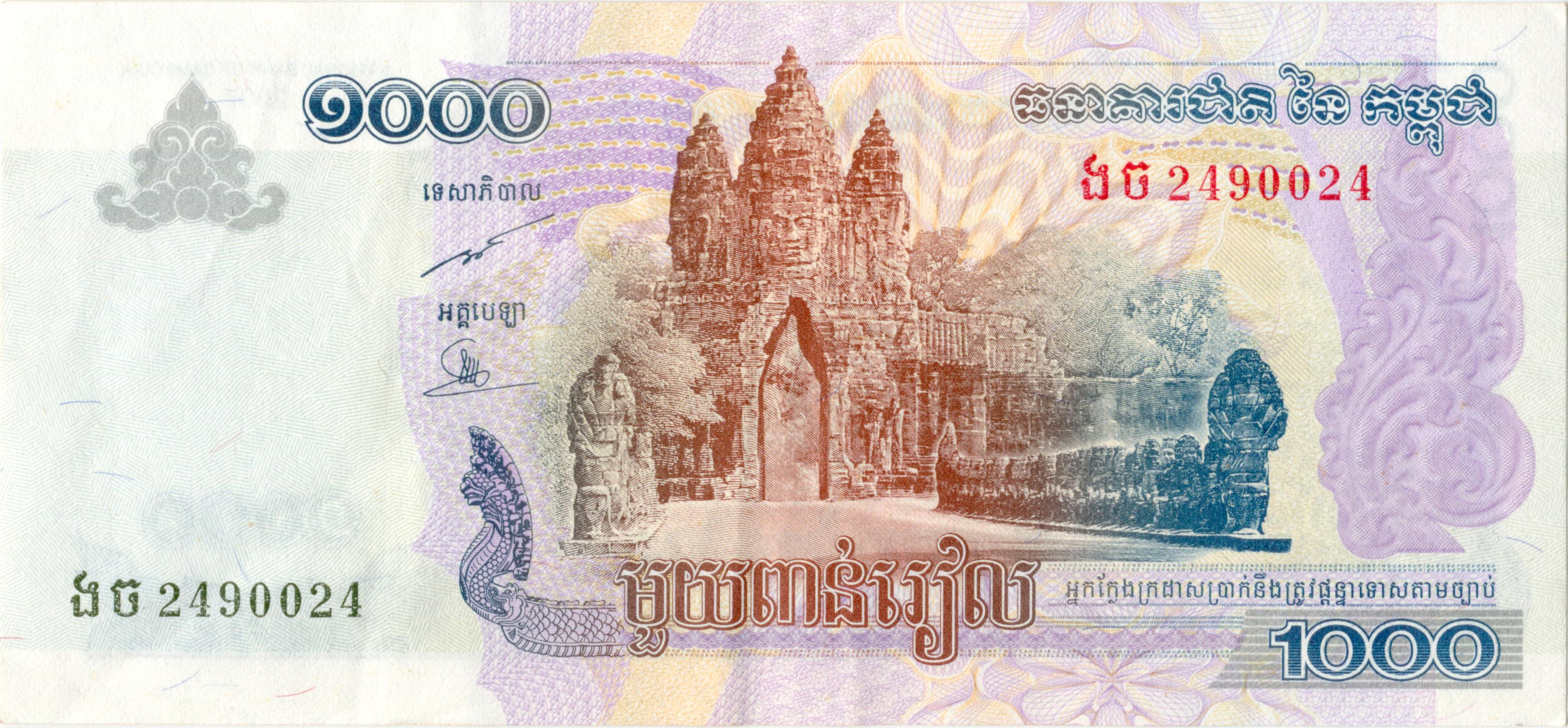
The Angkor Wat is an ancient temple and heritage site in Cambodia and is a symbol on the notes of Cambodian currency.

=== National identity and iconography ===
Since the eighteenth and nineteenth centuries, with the rise of nationalism, part of the nation-building process was the construction of a national past. This past comprised a collection of legends, traditions and myths. In Europe's emerging nations, ruins and relics became the centre of attention for group consciousness and national aspirations, which became an important motivation for the emergence of a preservation movement. This was because many buildings, landscapes and monuments achieved a great level of significance as symbols and icons of a growing nation. As such, these buildings and landscapes became national monuments, which possessed new meanings given the emergence of nationhood. Light and Dumbraveanu-Andone assert that the connection between heritage and national identity continues to be important. This is also evident in national identity related to an awareness of national heritage that is still visible around the world.

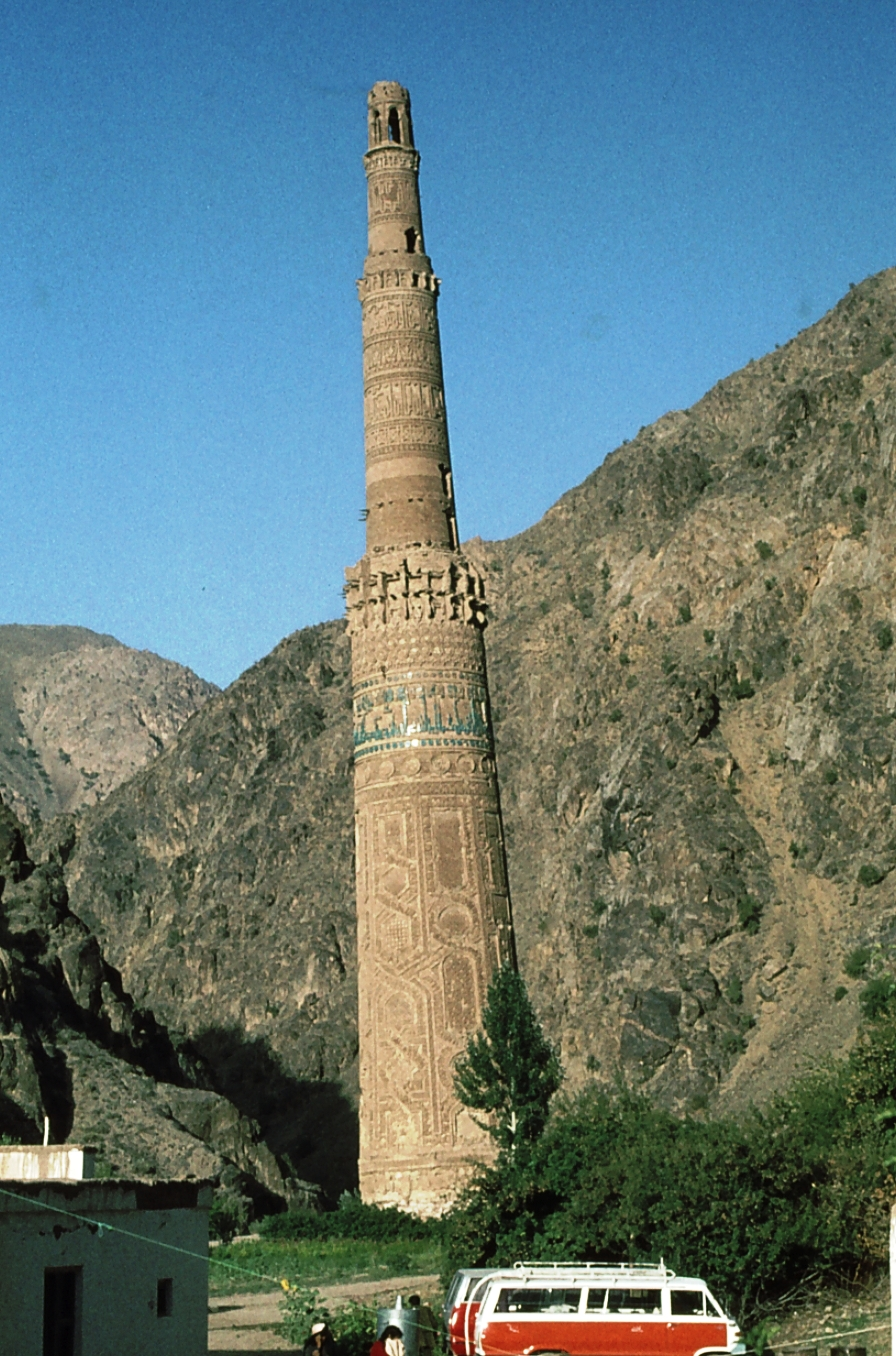
Minaret e Jam in Afghanistan, one of the tallest and oldest minarets in the world, is highly vulnerable to earthquakes.

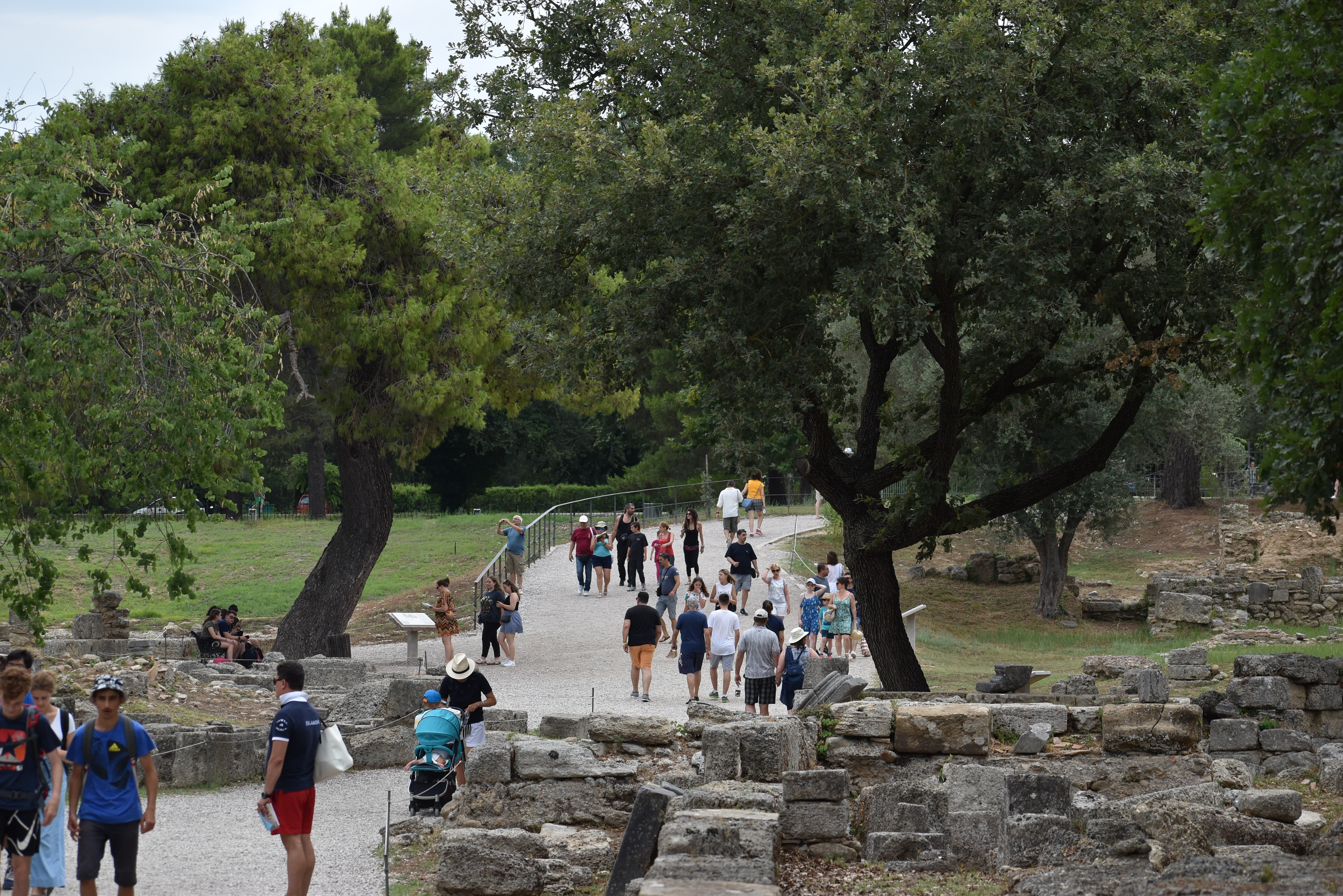
The archaeological site of Ancient Olympia in Greece where tourists, particularly archaeologists or students, visit from across the world for different purposes: to examine, study, or view the site.

Ancient monuments may also appear as national symbols in official imagery. Examples include the ruins of Baalbek on Lebanese currency, Angkor Wat on Cambodian currency and the Great Wall of China on Chinese currency. Ancient buildings are also depicted on the coats of arms of some countries as expressions of national identity.

=== Archaeology ===
The emergence of the discipline of archaeology was linked to the rise of nationalism. It was often emphasised to be used in service of the nation-state to reinforce its historical and territorial legitimacy. Archaeology as a culture-historical discipline is the study and preservation of remains from past societies and their environments. In this, the past is studied through preserving its sources including landscape (ancient monuments or heritage sites) and physical artefacts. The preservation and restoration are important for all heritage sites, particularly at locations of ancient monuments and archaeological areas that are in dangerous or delicate conditions.

== Preservation and care ==
United Kingdom

The Ancient Monuments and Archaeological Areas Act 1979 defined an "ancient monument" as any scheduled monument, or any other monument considered by the Secretary of State to be of public interest because of its historic, architectural, traditional, artistic or archaeological interest.

To protect, preserve and care for ancient monuments, various laws were passed during the late 19th and the 20th centuries. These included the Ancient Monuments Protection Act 1882 and the Ancient Monuments and Archaeological Areas Act 1979. The 1882 act was passed after several unsuccessful attempts, which ensured government involvement in England and Ireland to legally preserve and conserve ancient monuments. Following this, the Ancient Monuments Consolidation and Amendment Act 1913 provided an extension to the existing powers by introducing a concept known as 'preservation orders'. This enabled monuments under threat of removal or damage from neglectful treatment to be classified under the protection of the Commissioners of Works. In particular, section 6.2 qualified the monuments as of national importance and required them to be preserved. Additionally, any ancient monument could be considered for inclusion on that list, not just those in the care of the state, and this meant that for the first time legislative protection could be applied on a large scale. Thus Guardianship Monuments were distinguished from what later became defined as "scheduled monuments".

Furthermore, the Ancient Monuments Act 1931 extended its protection policies around previous monuments, including the scheduled monuments on the list, by introducing a notification system. As part of this system, monument owners had to give the Commissioners of Works three months' notice in writing of any works affecting the monument; this remained in force until 1979. During the 1930s and 1940s, there were a number of background strategies by various organisations concerned with ancient monuments. In the immediate aftermath of the Second World War, a committee was established to look into the existing state and future direction of archaeological work in Britain. This resulted in the publication of A Survey and policy of field research in the archaeology of Great Britain; and from this, more information about the past to fill gaps in knowledge.

- Historic Building and Ancient Monuments Act 1953
- Field Monuments Act 1972
- Ancient Monuments and Archaeological Areas Act 1979: This act consolidated and strengthened previous legislation made in relation to all types of ancient monuments. In addition to this, a Scheduled Monument Consent system was implemented to replace the notification procedure as outlined previously.

== Modern preservation ==
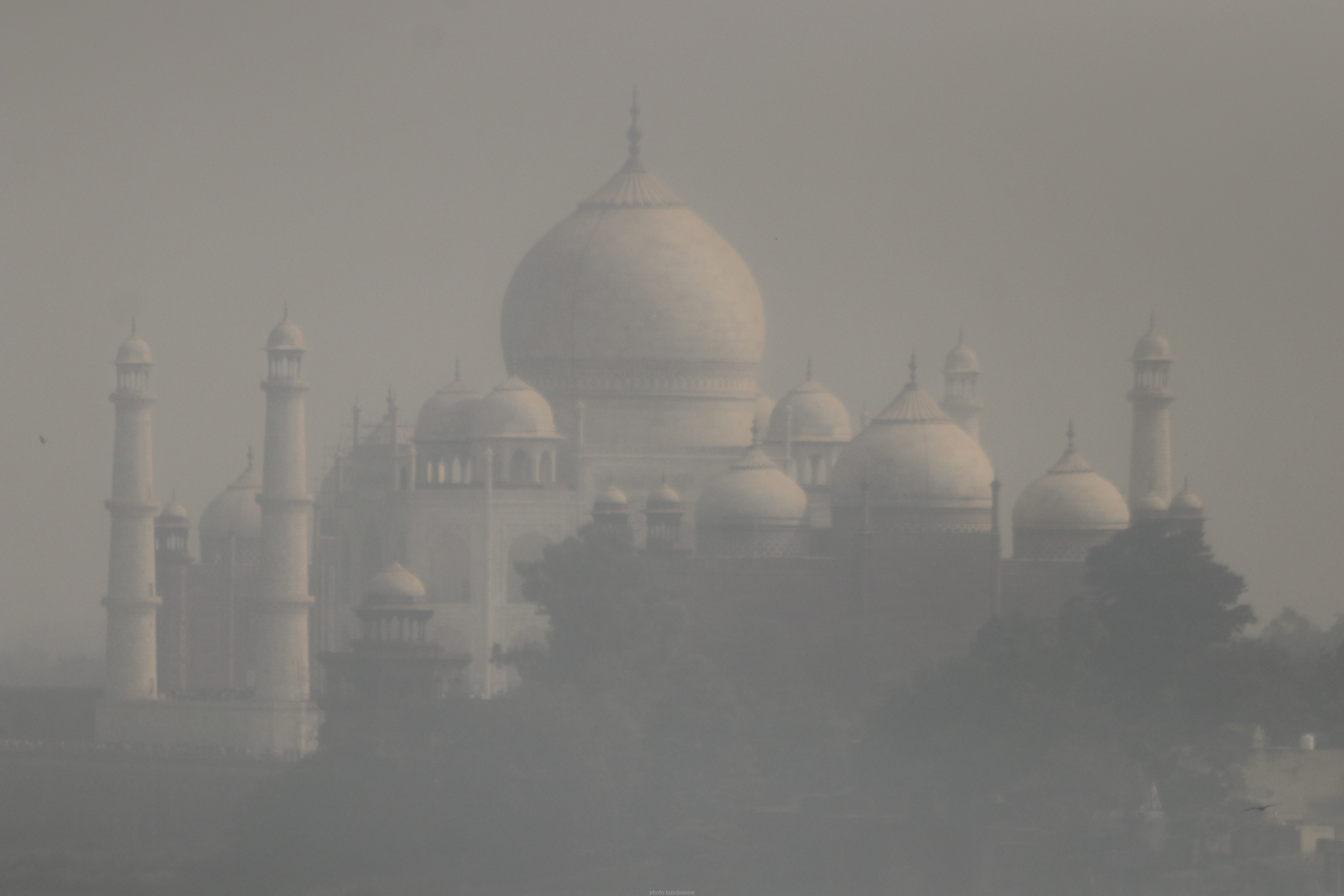
Pollution in Agra, India impacts the exteriors of the Taj Mahal.

The modern preservation techniques consist of physical planning and zoning. Physical planning at archaeological sites around ancient monuments help direct the vehicle and pedestrian traffic from sensitive areas. Additionally, zoning is a key principle of physical planning at monumental sites. It refers to the physical development and protection of sites in various zones of contact or distance from important resources. Zoning also enables certain amenities and visitor services to be managed in an effective manner. There are several approaches to physical planning and zoning at historic monuments. As each site has its own unique environmental concerns and needs, zoning may vary from one to two zones or at times, several zones to protect and manage the area.

Issues that ancient monuments such as historical buildings face can be linked to internal and external environmental factors. This include the new changes that can add improvements to the interior of the building can also lead to new factors that cause decay. The example Feilden used was of traditional and historical building construction "breathes" are useful as it enables the "easy passage of moisture vapor". In these cases, vapour checks and monitoring the environmental factors for balance is required. Other modern methods include preventive maintenance through acts such as the reduction of traffic vibration or air pollution through town planning controls. As a maintenance strategy, this conservative activity is considered as an important protective method without intervention.

== Tourism ==
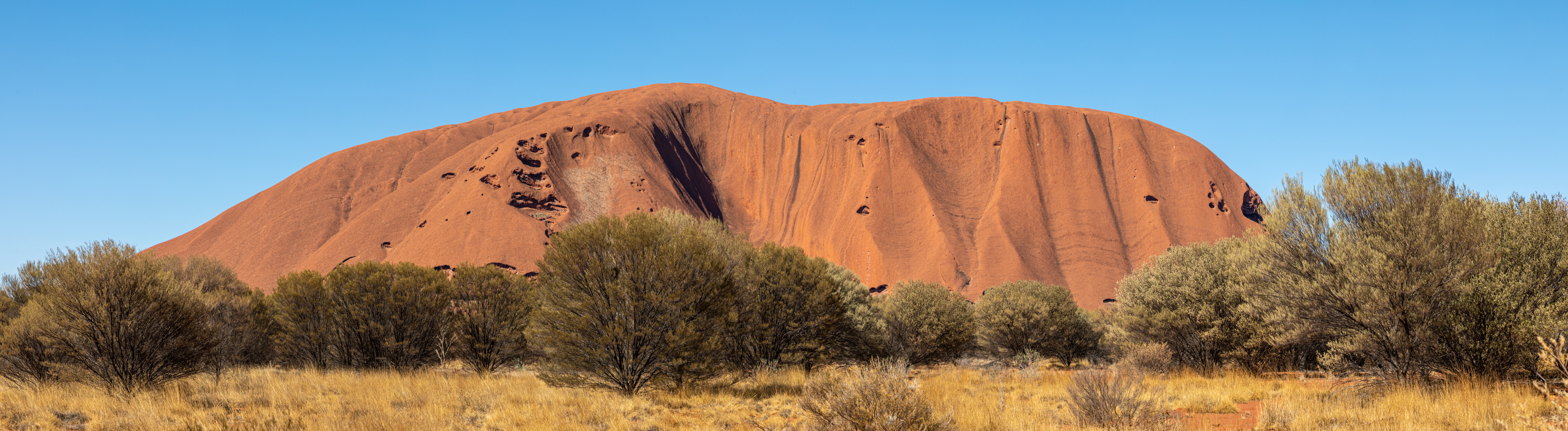
Uluru (Ayers Rock) is a sacred monolithic site to the First Nations of Australia.

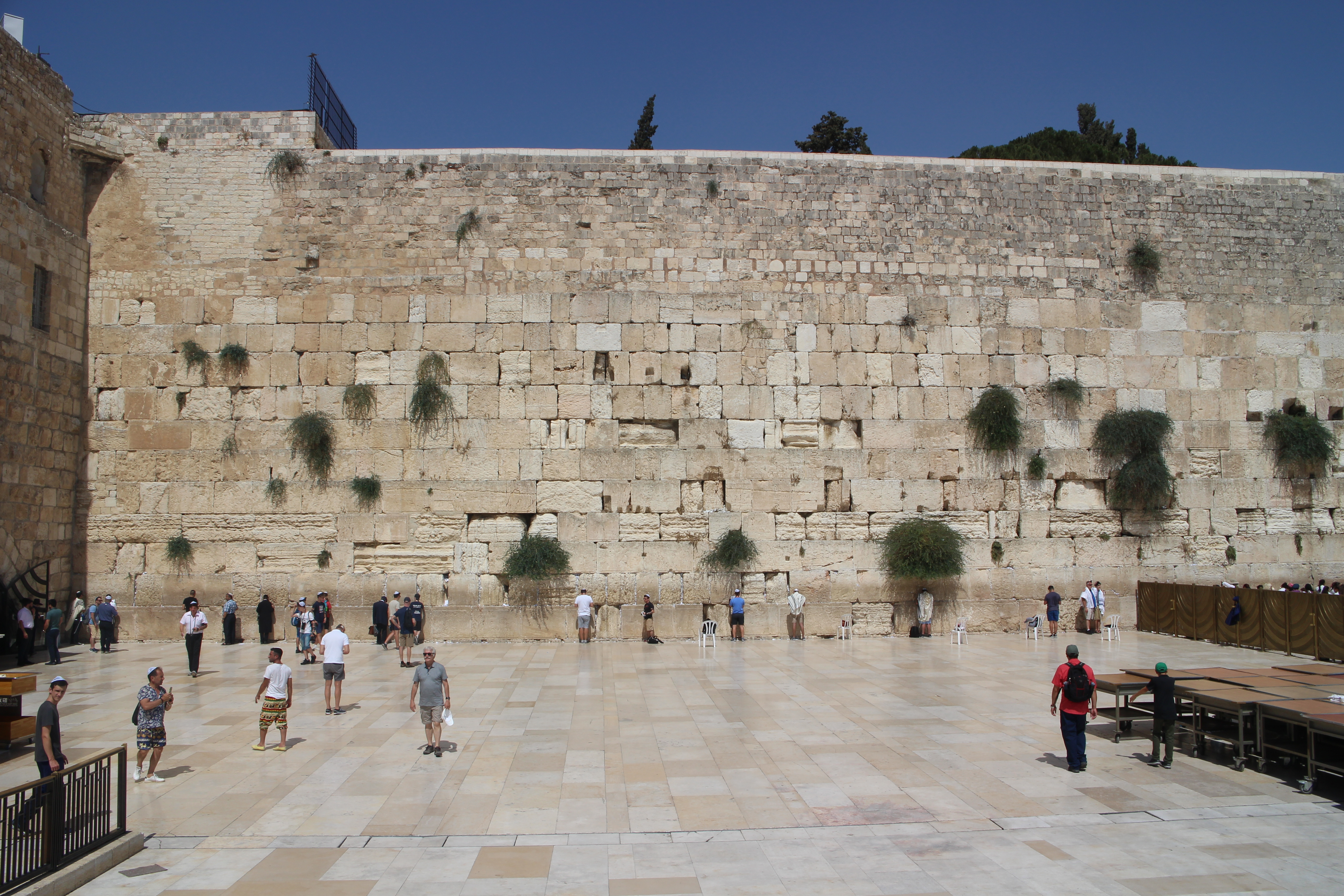
The Western Wall, located in the Jewish quarters of the Old city of Jerusalem, is a religious site for Jewish pilgrims.

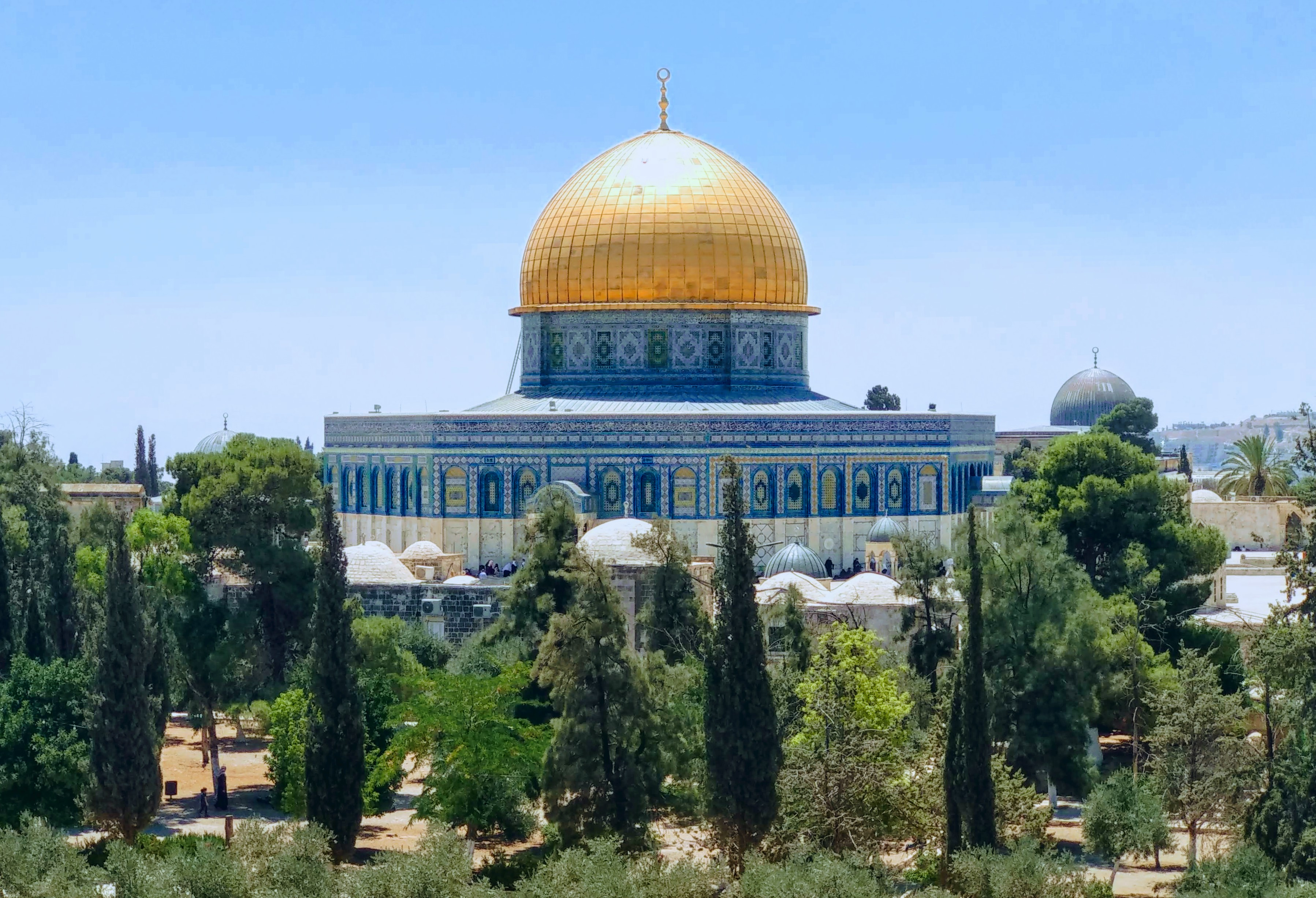
The Dome of the Rock, part of the compound known as the Masjid Al-Aqsa, is one of the holiest sites in Islam.

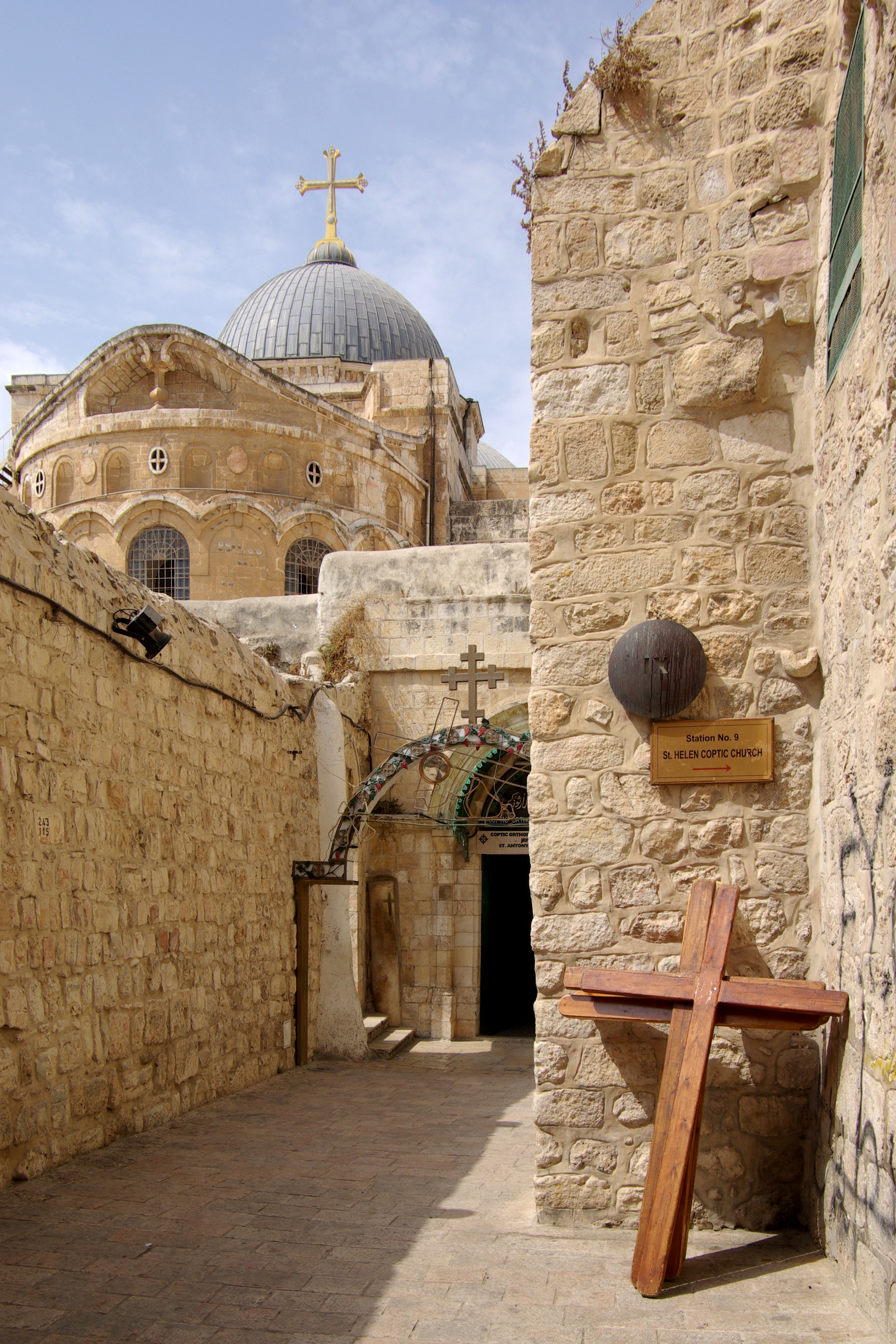
The Church of the Holy Sepulchre is a sacred site for Christians, who believe that it is the place where Jesus was crucified and resurrected and that his tomb is located there.

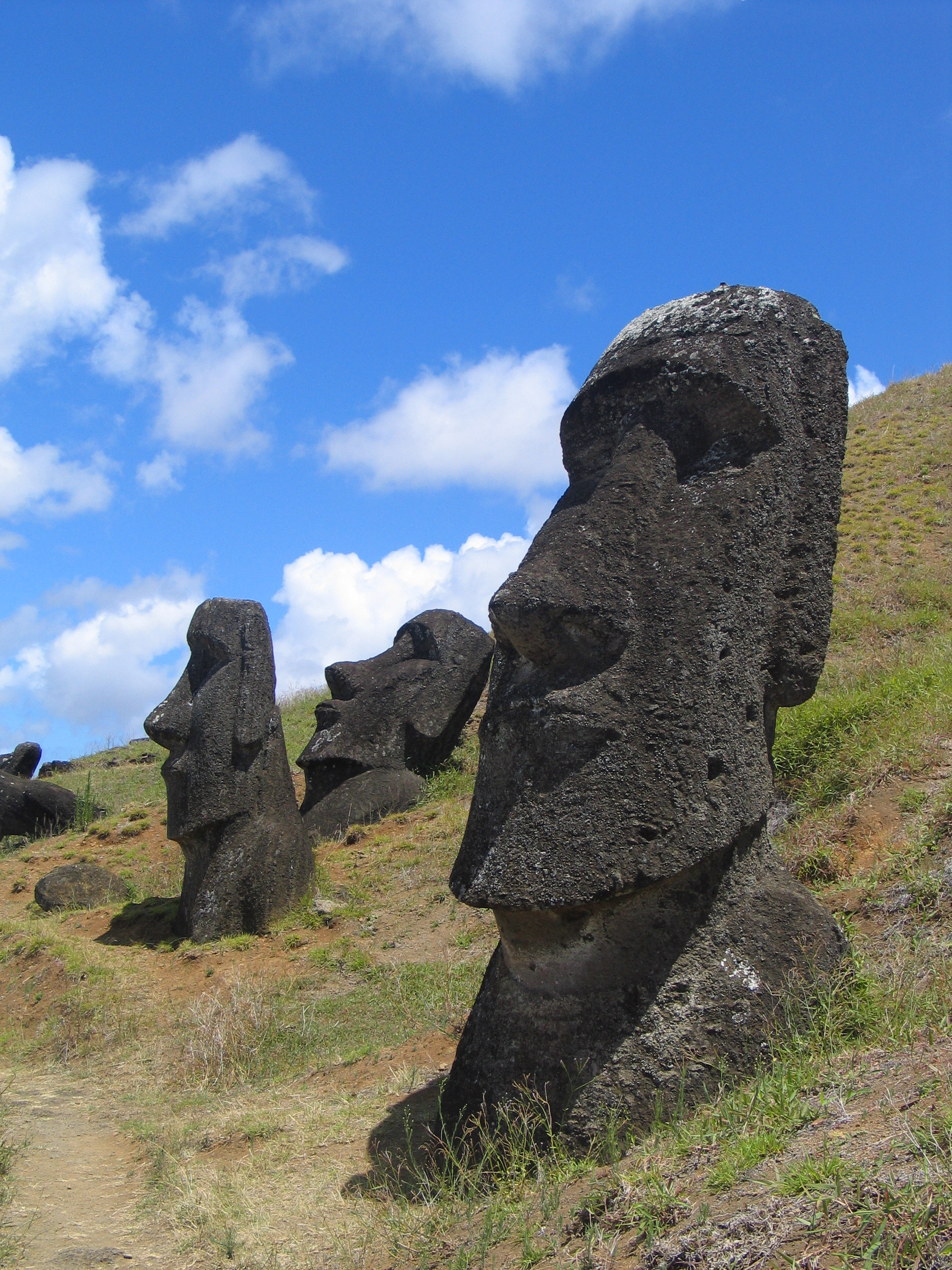
Moai Statues are monolithic ancient monuments at Easter Island, Chile

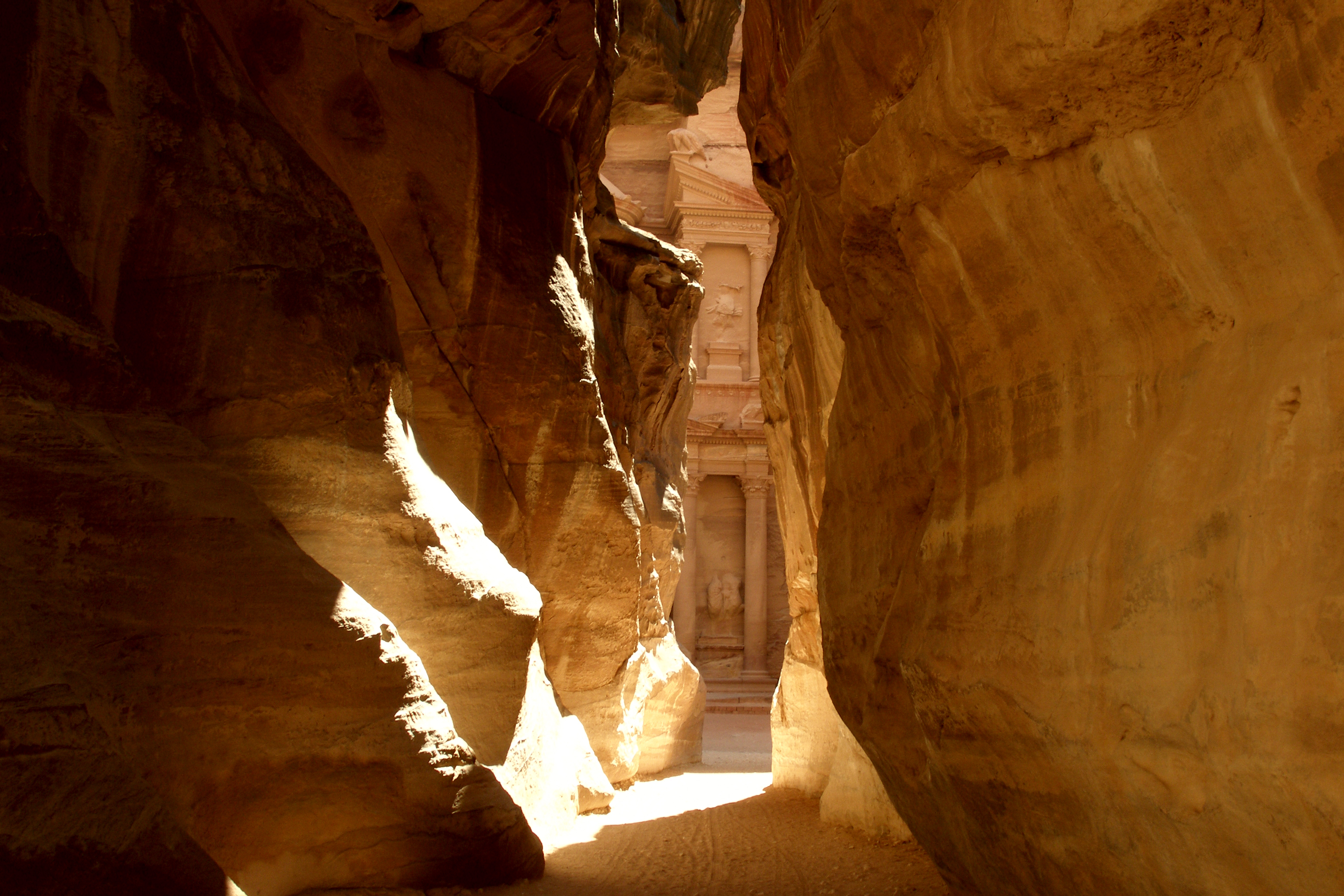
Petra Siq, entrance to the ancient Nabatean city of Petra, Jordan.

=== Heritage tourism ===
Following the mass decolonisation period after World War II, identity through remains, the past and landscapes became more common; and global tourism rapidly increased. With the rise of globalisation, tourism has grown to become a type of commodity during the 21st century, with new places and elements to discover. In addition to this, the exoticism and romanticism around experiencing other "more authentic" cultures have contributed to heritage and cultural tourism. As a result, ancient monuments are linked to heritage tourism because of the cultural and national aspect that the monuments embody. Heritage tours (including tours of ancient monuments) may include religious tourism and patriotic tourism.

==== Religious tourism ====
The concept of religious heritage tourism has been around for several centuries. According to Bond, Packer and Ballantyne, people have their own purpose and motives for visiting a religious heritage site or location. These include five key factors: to find spiritual and emotional connection, to discover new things, to engage mentally, to interact or belong as well as searching for peace to relax. Religious site tourism is also linked to pilgrimage as well as paying a visit to sites such as the Western Wall, the Church of the Holy Sepulchre and the Dome of the Rock in the Old City of Jerusalem. All these sites are considered to be ancient monuments as they are of historical and cultural importance.

==== Patriotic tourism ====
Tourism that are attached to nationalistic or patriotic sentiments is another type of heritage tourism. In the modern context, post World War I and World War II, certain places and sites and being claimed as nationalistic sites that patriotic tourists visit for the purpose of reclaiming and reaffirming their heritage and national identity. Such sites include the forts and castles of Ghana, the ANZAC Cove and the Great Wall of China. These types of ancient monuments fall under the category of national and historical importance. They are associated with culturally driven tourism linking to the colonial and violent past of nations that have become symbols of cultural reaffirmation and awakening.

=== Archaeological tourism ===
Whilst certain types of tourism can negatively impact the sustainability of historical and ancient sites, archaeological tourists have led to the conservation and maintenance of ancient monuments. All archaeological disciplines apply the same types of methods and one includes the study of the physical artefact or site. In the modern world, most archaeologists are involved in excavations to rescue and preserve archaeological traces that can be damaged from activities such as housing, road-building, natural gas pipelines or airports. Cultural heritage plays an important role with globalization and increasing ethnic recognition and thus, this type of management is significant. As such, archaeologists are taking care of several ancient monuments and historical sites, and with the growth of tourism, this has become more vital and is defined as "heritage management".

Archaeologists alongside to architects help preserve what other specialists, including art historians, cultural geographers, or ethnologists, study. These may include medieval churches, monolithic monuments or ancient relics, stupas or paintings. For example, the study of the concept of "dying culture" refers to a part or portion of a living, an existing culture that has older origins, however, is still in use. In this case, preservation of traditional objects, artefacts and monuments through archaeological study is both important for ancient monuments and the tourism industry.

Examples of archaeological excavation that are classified as ancient monuments:

- Moai Statues Easter Island, Chile
- Chichen Itza, Mexico
- Tikal, Guatemala
- Acropolis of Athens, Greece
- Giza Pyramids, Egypt
- Ancient Petra, Jordan

=== Other categories of tourists ===
- Journalists
- Students studying certain sites
- Volunteers
- Community leaders and politicians

== Types of ancient monuments ==
- Megalithic monuments: Large and rough stones that are arranged in place and preserved for several centuries. These ancient monuments are some of the oldest prehistoric monuments found in a range of countries around the world. Notable examples in England include Stonehenge on Salisbury Plain; Avebury Circle near Stonehenge; and Chûn Quoit in Cornwall.
- Palaces and castles: These types of monuments are of historical and national importance as some are symbols of their countries.
- Pyramid: A significant example is the Giza Pyramids of ancient Egypt, which were constructed to revere the Pharaoh.
- Sculptural monuments and mosaics: Some ancient monuments such as temples include stone relief sculptures and mosaics. These ancient monuments, such as the temple of Parthenon, included sculptures that are found in museums like the Louvre and the British Museum.
- Temple: There are many temples around the world that are classified as ancient monuments and world heritage sites. Some examples are the Temple of Anahita, Kangavar in Iran, several Ancient Greek temples and Megalithic Temples of Malta.
- Mosque: Early Islamic architecture included elaborate patterns. Some notable examples are the Great Mosque of Damascus (Umayyad Mosque), Masjid Al-Aqsa (Dome of the Rock) and the Tunisian Great Mosque of Kairouan.
- Tomb: Some examples are Mughal emperors' tombs such as the tomb of Aurangzeb and Akbar's tomb, as well as the Pharaoh Tutankhamun's tomb.

== See also ==
- English Heritage
- Historic preservation
- Scheduled monument
- Monument
