= Ancient monuments of Java =

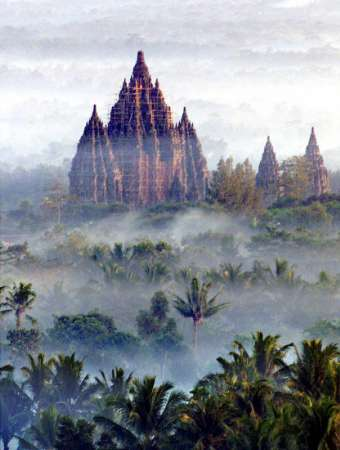
The Prambanan temple complex

Hundreds of ancient stone religious monuments lie on the island of Java. Known as candi in Indonesian, they date from the early classical period of Javanese civilisation, beginning in the first part of the 8th century CE and ending after 900 CE. The majority were built between 780 CE and 860 CE, even though the civilisation that created them existed for many centuries.

== History ==
The earliest surviving Hindu temples in Java are on the Dieng Plateau and are the island's earliest known standing stone buildings. The structures were built to honour the god-ancestors, Di Hyang, rather than for the convenience of people. Thought to have originally numbered as many as 400, only 8 remain today. The Dieng structures were small and relatively plain, but architecture developed substantially, and just 100 years later, the second Kingdom of Mataram built the Prambanan complex near Yogyakarta, considered the largest and finest example of Hindu architecture in Java. The World Heritage-listed Buddhist monument Borobudur was built by the Sailendra Dynasty between 750 and 850 AD, but it was abandoned shortly after its completion as a result of the decline of Buddhism and a shift of power to eastern Java. The monument contains a vast number of intricate carvings that tell a story as one moves through to the upper levels, metaphorically reaching enlightenment. With the decline of the Mataram kingdom, eastern Java became the focus of religious architecture with an exuberant style reflecting Shaivist, Buddhist, and Javanese influences - a fusion that was characteristic of religion throughout Java.

The Javanese temple plan and layout were changed from the centralistic, concentric and formal layout of the central Javanese period (8th—10th century) to a linear, often asymmetric layout following the topography of the site of eastern Java period (11th—15th century). The main temple of central Java temples, such as the Sewu temple complex, is located in the center of the complex, surrounded by perwara temples, while the main temple from the eastern Java period, such as Penataran temple complex, is located in the back, furthermost from the entrance, and often built on the highest ground of the temple complex. The rules of eastern Javanese temple layout are still followed closely by Balinese temples.

== As historical sources ==
Of the sites first noted by European observers in the 19th century, many have since disappeared, while other sites are still being discovered. The sites provide significant, albeit fragmentary, evidence of early Javanese society. Being in a tropical environment and on an island, hundreds of kilometres, from the mainland, Java does not have the harsh climate and seasonal change of a continental landmass. These factors are thought to have influenced the serenity which the carved stones display. Stone was only used to build temples, with no evidence of palaces or other secular buildings, which are thought to have been made of timber. The monuments are thus the most significant historical source. There are no remains from dwellings, villages, or towns of this era, and the temples lack detailed context. Many artefacts have been found near the temples, the majority of which are earthenware pottery, a medium in which Javanese craftsmen did not devote great artistry. More energy was spent on producing metal objects such as bronze utensils, and gold and silver jewellery, the majority of which was produced for religious purposes. The majority of everyday objects would have been made from organic materials such as wood, bamboo, rattan and vegetable fibres, which do not survive for long in a tropical environment.

== See also ==
- Candi of Indonesia
- Borobudur
- History of Indonesia
- Indonesian architecture
