= Ancient Monuments Protection Act 1882 =

Act of the Parliament of the United Kingdom

Ancient Monuments Protection Act 1882 (Note: Section 1.)
- Act of Parliament
- Parliament of the United Kingdom
- Long title: An Act for the better protection of Ancient Monuments.
- Citation: 45 & 46 Vict. c. 73
- Introduced by: John Lubbock, 1st Baron Avebury (Lords)
- Territorial extent: United Kingdom

Dates
- Royal assent: 18 August 1882
- Commencement: 18 August 1882 (Note: The Acts of Parliament (Commencement) Act 1793.)
- Repealed: England and Wales: 9 October 1981 (Note: The Ancient Monuments and Archaeological Areas Act 1979 (Commencement No. 2) Order 1981.)
Other legislation
Amended by	Ancient Monuments Protection Act 1900; Ancient Monuments Protection Act 1910
Repealed by	Ancient Monuments Consolidation and Amendment Act 1913; Ancient Monuments (Northern Ireland) Act 1926; Ancient Monuments and Archaeological Areas Act 1979

Status: Repealed

Text of statute as originally enacted

The Ancient Monuments Protection Act 1882 (45 & 46 Vict. c. 73) was an act of the Parliament of the United Kingdom. It was introduced by John Lubbock, 1st Baron Avebury, recognising the need for a governmental administration on the protection of ancient monuments, and was finally passed after a number of failed attempts on heritage protection acts. The gradual change towards a state-based authority responsible for the safeguarding of the Kingdom's national heritage manifested itself through the appointment of the first Inspector of Ancient Monuments in 1882, General Pitt Rivers.

== Development of the legislation ==
According to Halfin, "Lubbock's Bill came at a time when England was among the last of the European nations to be completely without protective legislation for cultural property. Many of his ideas were borrowed from a long history of royal and aristocratic interest in preservation that was prevalent in Europe during the nineteenth century. In particular, Lubbock was strongly influenced by the Abbé Gregoire, who had so successfully championed the cause of cultural preservation in France."

The first introduction of the bill in 1873 was controversial because it envisioned the government being able to compulsorily purchase monuments on privately owned land if the owner decided to develop the land. By the Act's passage in 1882, these provisions had been removed from the bill.

== The schedule ==
The act contains a schedule of the initial 68 sites that were covered by the legislation. These are almost all pre-historic monuments, some of the most famous such sites in the country among them, alongside some that were felt to be at particular risk at the time.

=== England and Wales ===
There were 26 English sites listed in the schedule, in just 10 counties, including seven sites in Wiltshire. Welsh monuments were represented by one site in each of north, south and west Wales.

Site name	1882 description	Site type	Period	Location
Plas Newydd Burial Chambers	The tumulus and dolmen, Plas Newydd, Llandedwen, Anglesea.	Chambered tomb	Neolithic	53.2038°N 4.2179°W
Wayland's Smithy	The tumulus known as Wayland Smith's Forge, Ashbury, Berkshire.	Long barrow	Neolithic	51.5672°N 1.5953°W
Uffington Castle	Uffington Castle, Uffington, Berkshire.	Hillfort	Iron Age	51.5748°N 1.5699°W
Long Meg and Her Daughters	The stone circle known as Long Meg and her Daughters, near Penrith, Addingham, Cumberland.	Stone circle	Bronze Age	54.7279°N 2.6676°W
Castlerigg stone circle	The stone circle on Castle Rigg, near Keswick, Crosthwaite, Cumberland.	Stone circle	Late Neolithic	54.6026°N 3.0975°W
Low Longrigg stone circles	The stone circles on Burn Moor, St. Bees, Cumberland.	Five stone circles	Bronze Age	54.4112°N 3.2757°W
Nine Ladies	The stone circle known as The Nine Ladies, Stanton Moor, Bakewell, Derbyshire.	Stone circle	Bronze Age	53.1681°N 1.6289°W
Arbor Low	The tumulus known as Arborlow, Bakewell, Derbyshire.	Henge	Neolithic	53.1689°N 1.7617°W
Hob Hurst's House	Hob Hurst's House and Hut, Baslow Moor. Bakewell, Derbyshire.	Round barrow	Bronze Age	53.2199°N 1.5701°W
Minninglow	Minning Low, Brassington, Derbyshire.	Round barrow	Neolithic	53.11245°N 1.6888°W
Arthur's Stone	Arthur's Quoit, Gower, Llanridian, Glamorganshire.	Chambered tomb	Neolithic	51.5936°N 4.1794°W
Uley Long Barrow	The tumulus at Uley, Gloucestershire.	Long barrow	Neolithic	51.6986°N 2.3058°W
Kit's Coty House	Kits Coty House, Aylesford, Kent.	Long barrow	Neolithic	51.3199°N 0.5029°E
Hunsbury Hill	Danes Camp, Hardingstone, Northamptonshire.	Hillfort	Iron Age	52.2189°N 0.9202°W
Castle Dykes Enclosure	Castle Dykes, Farthingston, Northamptonshire.	Hillfort enclosure	Iron Age to Roman	52.2019°N 1.0980°W
Rollright Stones	The Rollrich Stones, Little Rollright, Oxfordshire.	Megaliths	Neolithic and Bronze Age	51.9755°N 1.5708°W
Pentre Ifan	The Pentre Evan Cromlech, Nevern, Pembrokeshire.	Chambered tomb	Neolithic	51.9990°N 4.7700°W
Stanton Drew stone circles	The ancient stones at Stanton Drew, Somersetshire.	Two stone circles	Neolithic	51.3678°N 2.5753°W
Stoney Littleton Long Barrow	The chambered tumulus at Stoney Littleton, Wellow, Somersetshire.	Chambered tomb	Neolithic	51.3133°N 2.3813°W
Cadbury Castle	Cadbury Castle, South Cadbury, Somersetshire.	Hillfort	Iron Age	51.0241°N 2.5318°W
Mayburgh Henge	Mayborough, near Penrith, Barton, Westmoreland.	Henge	Neolithic or Bronze Age	54.6489°N 2.7465°W
King Arthur's Round Table (henge)	Arthur's Round Table, Penrith, Barton, Westmoreland.	Henge	Neolithic	54.6483°N 2.7403°W
Stonehenge	The group of stones known as Stonehenge, Amesbury, Wiltshire.	Henge	Bronze Age	51.1788°N 1.8262°W
Old Sarum	Old Sarum, Wiltshire.	Hillfort	Iron Age	51.0925°N 1.8057°W
Avebury	The vallum at Abury, the Sarcen stones within the same, those along the Kennet Road, and the group between Abury and Beckhampton, Abury, Wiltshire.	Henge	Neolithic	51.4286°N 1.8542°W
West Kennet Long Barrow	The long barrow at West Kennet, near Marlborough, West Kennet, Wiltshire.	Long barrow	Neolithic	51.4086°N 1.8511°W
Silbury Hill	Silbury Hill, Abury, Wiltshire.	Mound	Neolithic	51.4156°N 1.8575°W
The Devil's Den	The Dolmen (Devil's Den), near Marlborough, Fyfield, Wiltshire.	Chambered tomb	Neolithic	51.4257°N 1.7826°W
Barbury Castle	Barbury Castle, Ogboume, St. Andrews, and Swindon, Wiltshire.	Hillfort	Iron Age	51.4853°N 1.7865°W

=== Scotland ===
The 1882 schedule included 21 monuments, the majority of which are prehistoric sites. Two are Neolithic, five Bronze Age, eight Iron Age and six from early Christian/Pictish periods, although two of the prehistoric stones also have notable early Christian additions. Those sites now in the care of Historic Scotland are indicated with '(HS)'.

Site name	1882 description	Site type	Period	Location
Inverurie Cemetery, four symbol stones	The Bass of Inverury, Inverurie, Aberdeenshire.	Four Pictish Stones	9th century	57.2755°N 2.3665°W
Tap o' Noth, Rhynie	The vitrified fort on the Hill of Noath, Rhynie, Aberdeenshire.	Hillfort	Iron Age	57.3517°N 2.8575°W
Newton House, inscribed stone and symbol stone	The pillar and stone at Newton-in-the-Garioch, Culsalmond, Aberdeenshire.	Pictish stones	9th century	57.3565°N 2.5634°W
Edin's Hall Broch	The circular walled structures called "Edin’s Hall," on Cockburn Law, Dunse, Berwickshire.	Broch (HS)	Iron Age	55.8354°N 2.3656°W
Palisaded Huts Nr Lauder Barns	The British walled settlement enclosing huts at Harefaulds in Lauderdale, Lauder, Berwickshire.	settlement	Iron Age	55.7071°N 2.7256°W
Dun Dornaigil	The Dun of Dornadilla, Durness, Sutherlandshire.	Broch (HS)	Iron Age	58.3667°N 4.6386°W
Sueno's Stone	The sculptured stone called Suenos Stone, near Forres, Rafford, Elgin.	Standing stone	9th century	57.6157°N 3.5977°W
Drosten Stone	The cross slab, with inscription, in the churchyard of St. Vigeans, St. Vigeans, Forfarshire.	Pictish stone	9th century	56.577°N 2.5904°W
Caterthun	The British forts, on the hills, called "The Black and White Catherthuns," Menmuir, Forfarshire.	Hillforts (HS)	Iron Age	56.7842°N 2.7408°W
Clava cairns	A group of remains and pillars, on a haugh at Clava on the banks of the Nairn, Croy and Dalcross, Inverness.	Chamber tomb (HS)	Bronze Age	57.4737°N 4.0743°W
Dun Telve and Dun Troddan	The Pictish Towers at Glenelg, Inverness.	Brochs (HS)	Iron Age	57.1946°N 5.5946°W
Drumwhirn Cairn and Boreland cairn?	The Cairns, with chambers and galleries partially dilapidated, Minnigaff, Kirkcudbrightshire.	Chamber tombs	Bronze Age	54.9899°N 4.4945°W
Cat Stane	The Catstane, an inscribed pillar, Kirkliston, Linlithgow.	Inscribed stone	Bronze Age & 5th century	55.9548°N 3.3645°W
Ring of Brodgar	The Ring of Brogar and other stone pillars at Stennis in Orkney, and the neighbouring pillars, Firth and Stennis, Orkney.	Henge (HS)	Neolithic	59.002°N 3.2287°W
Maeshowe	The Chambered mound of Maeshowe, Firth and Stennis, Orkney.	Chambered cairn (HS)	Neolithic	58.9966°N 3.1882°W
Callanish Stones	The stones of Callernish, Uig, Ross.	Stone circles	Bronze Age & 5th century	58.197°N 6.745°W
Broch of Clickimin	The Burgh of Clickanim, Sound, Shetland.	Broch (HS)	Iron Age	60.1492°N 1.1657°W
Broch of Mousa	The Pictish tower at Mousa in Shetland, Dunrossness, Shetland.	Broch (HS)	Iron Age	59.9956°N 1.1826°W
(now in Whithorn Priory Museum?)	The inscribed slab standing on the roadside leading from Wigton to Whithorn and about a mile from Whithorn, Whithorn, Wigtonshire.	Inscribed stone	Early Christian	
Laggangairn Standing Stones	Two stones, with incised crosses, on a mound in a field at Laggangairn, New Luce, Wigtonshire.	Standing stones (HS)	Bronze Age & early Christian	55.0071°N 4.7818°W
Kirkmadrine Early Christian Stones	The pillars at Kirkmadrine, Stoneykirk, Wigtonshire.	Inscribed stones (HS)	6th century	54.7936°N 4.9881°W

=== Ireland ===
In 1882 the whole of Ireland was part of the United Kingdom. Subsequent legislation for Ireland used the terminology of historic monuments, which continues in Northern Ireland. Three sites in the schedule are in what became Northern Ireland, one being in County Armagh and two in County Down. The fifteen sites now in the Republic of Ireland are protected by the National Monuments Service and include two world heritage sites. As with England and Wales, the 1882 selection was overwhelmingly those thought to be prehistoric sites, although there is now uncertainty over the age of many sites.

Site name	1882 description	Site type	Period	Location
Navan Fort	The earthen enclosure and mounds called the Navan Fort, Eglish, Armagh.	Ceremonial site	Iron Age, Celtic	54.3453°N 6.7186°W
Glencolumbkille Cashel	Stone monuments and groups of sepulchral cists in Glen Maulin, Glencolumbkille, Banagh, Donegal.			51.5646°N 9.0871°W
Grianan of Aileach	The earthen and stone inclosure known as Grimm of Aileach, Burt, West Innishowen, Donegal.			55.0167°N 7.4333°W
Giant's Ring	The earthen inclosure and Cromlech called the Giant's Ring near Ballylessan, Drumbo, Upper Castlereagh, Down.			54.5403°N 5.95°W
Downpatrick Mound of Down?	The earthen fort at Downpatrick (Dunkeltair), Leoale, Down.			54.3323°N 5.7212°W
Staigue stone fort	Stone structure called Staigue Fort, Kilcrogham, Dunkerron, Kerry.	Ringfort	Iron Age	51.8053°N 10.0158°W
Greenmount Motte	The earthen mound at Greenmount, Kilsaren, Ardee, Kerry.	Motte over a Souterrain	Anglo-Norman and older	53.8781°N 6.3856°W
Ballina megalithic tomb (Dolmen of the Four Maols)	The stone monument at Ballyna, Kilmoremoy, Tyrawly, Mayo.	Chamber tomb	Bronze Age	54.1071°N 9.166°W
Glebe Stone Circles	Cairns and stone circles at Moytura, Cong, Kilmaine, Mayo.	Stone Circles		53.5477°N 9.2649°W
Brú na Bóinne (Bend of the Boyne) World heritage site	The tumuli, New Grange, Knowth and Dowth, Monknewton and Dowth, Upper Slane, Meath.	Megalithic complex	Neolithic	53.6928°N 6.4493°W
Hill of Tara	The earthworks on the hill of Tara, Skreen, Meath.		multi-period	53.5775°N 6.6119°W
Telltown	The earthworks at Teltown (Taltin), Upper Kells, Meath.		Bronze Age	53.7003°N 6.7665°W
Hill of Ward	The earthworks at Wardstown (Tlaghta), Athboy, Lune, Meath.	Ringfort	Iron Age	53.624°N 6.886°W
Slieve na Calliagh	The two central tumuli on the hills called Slieve Na Calliagh, Loughcrew, Fore, Meath.	Megalithic complex	Neolithic	53.7445°N 7.1117°W
Heapstown Cairn	The Cairn at Heapstown, Kilmacallan, Tirerrill, Sligo.	Passage tomb		54.0951°N 8.3483°W
Knocknarea passage tombs & Medb's Cairn	Sepulchral remains at Carrowmore. The cairn called Miscaun Mave or Knocknarea, Kilmacowen, Curbury, Sligo.	Passage tomb	Neolithic	54.2589°N 8.5746°W
Drumlohan Souterrain & Ogham Stones	The cave containing Ogham inscribed stones at Drumloghan, Stradbally, Decies-without-Drum, Waterford.			52.163319°N 7.465368°W
Hill of Uisneach (Royal sites of Ireland)	The stone monument called the Catstone and the cemetery on the hill of Usnagh, Killare, Rathconrath, Westmeath.	Royal inauguration site		53.49°N 7.562°W

== Subsequent developments ==
The whole act, except the schedule, was repealed by section 24 of, and the second schedule to, the Ancient Monuments Consolidation and Amendment Act 1913 (3 & 4 Geo. 5. c. 32), which came into force on 15 August 1913.

The schedule to the act was repealed by section 64(3) of, and schedule 5 to, the Ancient Monuments and Archaeological Areas Act 1979, which came into force in England and Wales on 9 October 1981, and in Scotland on 30 November 1981.

== See also ==
- Ancient Monuments Protection Act 1900
- Ancient Monuments Protection Act 1910
- Ancient Monuments Consolidation and Amendment Act 1913
- Ancient Monuments and Archaeological Areas Act 1979
- Reproduced copy of 1882 Act
- List of prehistoric structures in Great Britain
