= Ted Peers (footballer) =

English footballer

Personal information
- Full name: Edward Henry Peers
- Date of birth: 19 March 1872
- Place of birth: Wednesfield, England
- Date of death: 1905 (aged 32–33)
- Position: Full back

Senior career*
| Years | Team | Apps | (Gls) |
| 1893–1894 | Wednesfield Rovers | | |
| 1894–1895 | Hednesford Rovers | | |
| 1895–1896 | West Bromwich Albion | 0 | (0) |
| 1896–1899 | Walsall | 73 | (2) |
| 1899–1901 | Nottingham Forest | 56 | (0) |
| 1901–1902 | Burton United | 9 | (0) |
| Total | | 138 | (2) |
- * Club domestic league appearances and goals

Edward Henry Peers (26 April 1873–1905) was an English footballer who played in the Football League for Burton United, Nottingham Forest and Walsall.
