= Ancient Monuments Protection Act 1900 =

Act of the Parliament of the United Kingdom

Ancient Monuments Protection Act 1900 (Note: Section 8.)
- Act of Parliament
- Parliament of the United Kingdom
- Long title: An Act to amend the Ancient Monuments Protection Act, 1882.
- Citation: 63 & 64 Vict. c. 34
- Territorial extent: England and Wales; Scotland; (Note: Section 7.)

Dates
- Royal assent: 6 August 1900
- Commencement: 6 August 1900 (Note: The Acts of Parliament (Commencement) Act 1793.)
- Repealed: 15 August 1913
Other legislation
| Amends | Ancient Monuments Protection Act 1882 |
| Amended by | Ancient Monuments Protection Act 1910 |
| Repealed by | Ancient Monuments Consolidation and Amendment Act 1913 |

Status: Repealed

Text of statute as originally enacted

The Ancient Monuments Act 1900 (63 & 64 Vict. c. 34) was an act of the Parliament of the United Kingdom that aimed to improve the protection afforded to ancient monuments in Great Britain.

== Details ==
The Ancient Monuments Protection Act 1882 (45 & 46 Vict. c. 73) had begun the process of establishing legal protection for Britain's ancient monuments; these had all been prehistoric sites, such as ancient tumuli. By the turn of the century, the scope of the earlier legislation was felt to be insufficient, and the act empowered the government's Commissioners of Work and local county councils to protect a wider range of properties. The act also allowed these groups to provide public access to ancient monuments, and to financially assist with their conservation.

== Consequences ==
The Ancient Monuments Protection Act 1910 (10 Edw. 7. & 1 Geo. 5. c. 3) expanded on the 1900 act. In 1913, gaps in the legislation between the protection ascribed to monuments under the three previous acts led to the a royal commission and the passing of the additional Ancient Monuments Consolidation and Amendment Act 1913 (3 & 4 Geo. 5. c. 32).

== Repeal ==
The whole act was repealed, except so far as it related to Ireland, by section 24 of, and the second schedule to, Ancient Monuments Consolidation and Amendment Act 1913 (3 & 4 Geo. 5. c. 32), subject to the proviso in section 24, which came into force on 15 August 1913.

== See also ==
- List of prehistoric structures in Great Britain
- Reproduced text of Ancient Monuments Protection Act 1900

== Bibliography ==
- Mynors, Charles. (2006) Listed Buildings, Conservation Areas and Monuments. London: Sweet and Maxwell. ISBN 978-0-421-75830-8.
