= Ancient Monuments Consolidation and Amendment Act 1913 =

Act of the Parliament of the United Kingdom

Ancient Monuments Consolidation and Amendment Act 1913 (Note: Section 25(1).)
- Act of Parliament
- Parliament of the United Kingdom
- Long title: An Act to consolidate and amend the Law relating to Ancient Monuments and for other purposes in connection therewith.
- Citation: 3 & 4 Geo. 5. c. 32
- Territorial extent: England and Wales; Scotland; (Note: Section 25(2).)

Dates
- Royal assent: 15 August 1913
- Commencement: 15 August 1913 (Note: The Acts of Parliament (Commencement) Act 1793.)
- Repealed: England and Wales: 9 October 1981 (Note: The Ancient Monuments and Archaeological Areas Act 1979 (Commencement No. 2) Order 1981 (SI 1981/1300).); Scotland: 30 November 1981 (Note: The Ancient Monuments and Archaeological Areas Act 1979 (Commencement No. 3) Order 1981 (SI 1981/1466).)
Other legislation
Repeals/revokes	Ancient Monuments Protection Act 1882; Ancient Monuments Protection Act 1900; Ancient Monuments Protection Act 1910
Amended by	Ancient Monuments Act 1931; Local Government Act 1933; Local Government (Scotland) Act 1947; Charities Act 1960; Courts Act 1971
Repealed by	Ancient Monuments and Archaeological Areas Act 1979

Status: Repealed

Text of statute as originally enacted

The Ancient Monuments Consolidation and Amendment Act 1913 (3 & 4 Geo. 5. c. 32) was an act of the Parliament of the United Kingdom that aimed to improve the protection afforded to ancient monuments in Britain.

== Background ==
The Ancient Monuments Protection Act 1882 (45 & 46 Vict. c. 73) had begun establishing legal protection for some of Britain's ancient monuments; these had all been prehistoric sites, such as ancient tumuli. The Ancient Monuments Protection Act 1900 (63 & 64 Vict. c. 34) continued this process, empowering the government's Commissioners of Work and local county councils to protect a wider range of properties. In 1908, a royal commission concluded that there were gaps between these two pieces of legislation and the Ancient Monuments Protection Act 1910 (10 Edw. 7. & 1 Geo. 5. c. 3). These were felt unwieldy, and the act repealed all three, replacing them with a new structure.

One of the main bill's sponsors was the former viceroy George Curzon, 1st Marquess Curzon of Kedleston, who saved Tattershall Castle, Lincolnshire, in 1911. Until then, building owners could do with it as they pleased. The experience left a deep impression on Lord Curzon, who determined that new laws had to be enacted to protect Britain's heritage.

== Provisions ==
The new structure involved the creation of the Ancient Monuments Board to oversee the protection of such monuments. Powers were given to the board, with parliamentary approval, to issue preservation orders to protect monuments and extend the public right of access to these. The term "monument" was expanded to include the lands around it, allowing the protection of the wider landscape.

=== Repealed enactments ===
Section 24 of the act repealed 3 enactments, listed in the second schedule to the act.

Citation	Short title	Extent of repeal
45 & 46 Vict. c. 73	Ancient Monuments Protection Act 1882	The whole act except so far as it relates to Ireland and except the Schedule.
63 & 64 Vict. c. 34	Ancient Monuments Protection Act 1900	The whole act except so far as it relates to Ireland.
10 Edw. 7 & 1 Geo. 5. c. 3	Ancient Monuments Protection Act 1910	The whole act except so far as it relates to Ireland.

== Subsequent developments ==
By 1931, over 3,000 monuments had been listed with preservation orders, and over 200 had been taken into public ownership. However, gaps in the legislation remained, leading to the passing of the Ancient Monuments Act 1931 (21 & 22 Geo. 5. c. 16).

However, the whole of both the 1913 act and the 1931 act were repealed by section 64(3) of, and schedule 5 to, the Ancient Monuments and Archaeological Areas Act 1979, which came into force in England and Wales on 9 October 1981, and in Scotland on 30 November 1981.

== Ecclesiastical exemption ==
A component of the act that remains controversial to the present day is the ecclesiastical exemption from listed buildings control, covering all ecclesiastical buildings in ecclesiastical use. Subsequently, the Ecclesiastical Exemption (Listed Buildings and Conservation Areas) Order 1994 confined the exemption to denominations deemed to have suitable internal control mechanisms in place: the Church of England, the Church in Wales, the Methodist Church, the United Reformed Church, the Roman Catholic Church and the Baptist Union of Great Britain. Some heritage bodies have urged the exemption's abolition, arguing that it facilitates irreparable damage to historic church interiors in the name of renovation. Howell & Sutton (1989) argued on behalf of The Victorian Society:

The maltreatment of churches is facilitated by the existence of the so-called “Ecclesiastical Exemption” . . . It is greatly to be hoped that this anomalous situation will soon be rectified. The Victorian Society has strongly urged the total abolition of the exemption for all denominations.

The Church of England General Synod has expressed the ecclesiastical position:

Those who minister in churches and have responsibilities in relation to the maintenance of churches and their contents should rightly be conscious of their part in ensuring that churches are indeed "living buildings." This may often result in a desire to alter the church's interior in some way to make it more suited to modern worship. You may also seek to add facilities, such as toilets, kitchens, or meeting rooms, either within the building or by extending it.

== Bibliography ==
- Howell, Peter; Sutton, Ian, eds. (1989). The Faber Guide to Victorian Churches. London: Faber and Faber. ISBN 978-0571147335.
- Last, Kathryn V. (2002). "The Privileged Position of the Church of England in the Control of Works to Historic Buildings: The Provenance of the Ecclesiastical Exemption from Listed Building Control". Common Law World Review. 31: 205–235.
- Mynors, Charles (2006). Listed Buildings, Conservation Areas and Monuments. London: Sweet and Maxwell. ISBN 978-0-421-75830-8.
- Rule Committee of the General Synod of the Church of England (1999). Making Changes to a Listed Church: Guidelines for Clergy, Churchwardens and Parochial Church Councils prepared by the Ecclesiastical Rule Committee. London: Church House.
