= Ancient Monuments Protection Act 1910 =

Act of the Parliament of the United Kingdom

Ancient Monuments Protection Act 1910 (Note: Section 2.)
- Act of Parliament
- Parliament of the United Kingdom
- Long title: An Act to amend the Ancient Monuments Protection Acts, 1882 to 1900, with respect to the gift, devise, or bequest of monuments to the Commissioners of Works.
- Citation: 10 Edw. 7. & 1 Geo. 5. c. 3
- Territorial extent: United Kingdom

Dates
- Royal assent: 24 March 1910
- Commencement: 24 March 1910 (Note: The Acts of Parliament (Commencement) Act 1793.)
- Repealed: England and Wales and Scotland: 15 August 1913; Northern Ireland:
Other legislation
Amends	Ancient Monuments Protection Act 1882; Ancient Monuments Protection Act 1900
Repealed by	England and Wales and Scotland: Ancient Monuments Consolidation and Amendment Act 1913; Northern Ireland: Ancient Monuments Act (Northern Ireland) 1926

Status: Repealed

Text of statute as originally enacted

The Ancient Monuments Protection Act 1910 (10 Edw. 7. & 1 Geo. 5. c. 3) was an act of the Parliament of the United Kingdom that aimed to improve the protection afforded to ancient monuments in Britain.

== Background ==
The Ancient Monuments Protection Act 1882 (45 & 46 Vict. c. 73) had begun the process of establishing legal protection for some of Britain's ancient monuments; these had all been prehistoric sites, such as ancient tumuli. The Ancient Monuments Protection Act 1900 (63 & 64 Vict. c. 34) had continued this process, empowering the government's Commissioners of Works and local county councils to protect a wider range of properties. In 1908 a royal commission concluded that there were gaps between these two pieces of legislation, and the act was passed, allowing the commissioners and councils to receive ancient monuments as gifts, and making damaging the wider set of ancient monuments described in 1900 legislation a criminal offence in the same way as those covered by the 1882 legislation.

== Subsequent developments ==
The operation of the combined legislation was felt to be unwieldy, and three years later the whole act was repealed by section 24 of, and the second schedule to, the Ancient Monuments Consolidation and Amendment Act 1913 (3 & 4 Geo. 5. c. 32), which came into force on 15 August 1913.

== Bibliography ==
- Mynors, Charles. (2006) Listed Buildings, Conservation Areas and Monuments. London: Sweet and Maxwell. ISBN 978-0-421-75830-8.
