= Parisi (surname) =

Parisi is an Italian surname. Notable people with the surname include:

- Ascanio Parisi (died 1614), Roman Catholic Bishop of Marsico Nuovo and Titular Bishop of Hebron (1599–1600)
- Alessandro Parisi (politician) (1882–1938), Italian soldier, politician, industrialist
- Alessandro Parisi (footballer, born 1977) (born 1977), Italian footballer
- Alessandro Parisi (footballer, born 1988) (born 1988), Italian footballer
- Alice Parisi (born 1990), Italian footballer
- Angelo Parisi (born 1953), French judoka and olympic champion
- Arturo Parisi (born 1940), Italian politician
- Bruno Parisi (1884–1957), Italian zoologist and museum director
- Cliff Parisi (born 1960), British actor
- Franca Parisi (born 1933), Italian actress
- Francesco Parisi (economist) (born 1962), Italian-American scholar in law and economics
- Francesco Parisi (painter) (1857–1948), Italian-Argentine painter
- Francesco Parisi (politician) (1930–2016), Italian Christian Democracy politician
- Franco Parisi (born 1967), Chilean economist and politician
- Franco Parisi (soccer) (born 1983), Australian football player
- Giampaolo Parisi (born 1979), Italian footballer
- Giorgio Parisi (born 1948), Italian physicist and 2021 winner of the Nobel Prize in Physics
- Giovanni Parisi (1967–2009), Italian boxer
- Gustavo "Cucho" Parisi, member of the Argentine band Los Auténticos Decadentes
- Heather Parisi (born 1960), American-born Italian television presenter, dancer, singer and actress
- Hugo Parisi (born 1984), Brazilian diver
- Joanna Parisi, Italian-American operatic spinto soprano
- Joe Parisi (born 1960), American politician
- Joseph Parisi (disambiguation), several people
- Lautaro Parisi (born 1994), Argentine professional footballer
- Mark Parisi (born 1961), American cartoonist
- Melissa Parisi, American geneticist and physician
- Mike Parisi (born 1983), American professional baseball pitcher
- Paula Parisi (born 1967), Argentine volleyball player
- Stefano Parisi (born 1956), Italian businessman and politician
- Tino Parisi (born 1995), Italian football player
- Tony Parisi (wrestler) (1941–2000), Italian-born Canadian professional wrestler
- Tony Parisi (software developer) (born 1962), Italian entrepreneur, researcher and developer of 3D computer software
- Vittorio Parisi (born 1957), Italian conductor and teacher

== See also ==
- Johnny Swinger (born 1975), professional wrestler who performed under the name "Johnny Parisi"
- Paris (surname)
- Parisii (disambiguation)
