= Alessandro Parisi =

Alessandro Parisi may refer to:

- Alessandro Parisi (politician) (1882–1938), Italian soldier, politician, industrialist
- Alessandro Parisi (footballer, born 1977), Italian footballer
- Alessandro Parisi (footballer, born 1988), Italian footballer
