= Historic preservation =

Preservation of items of historical significance

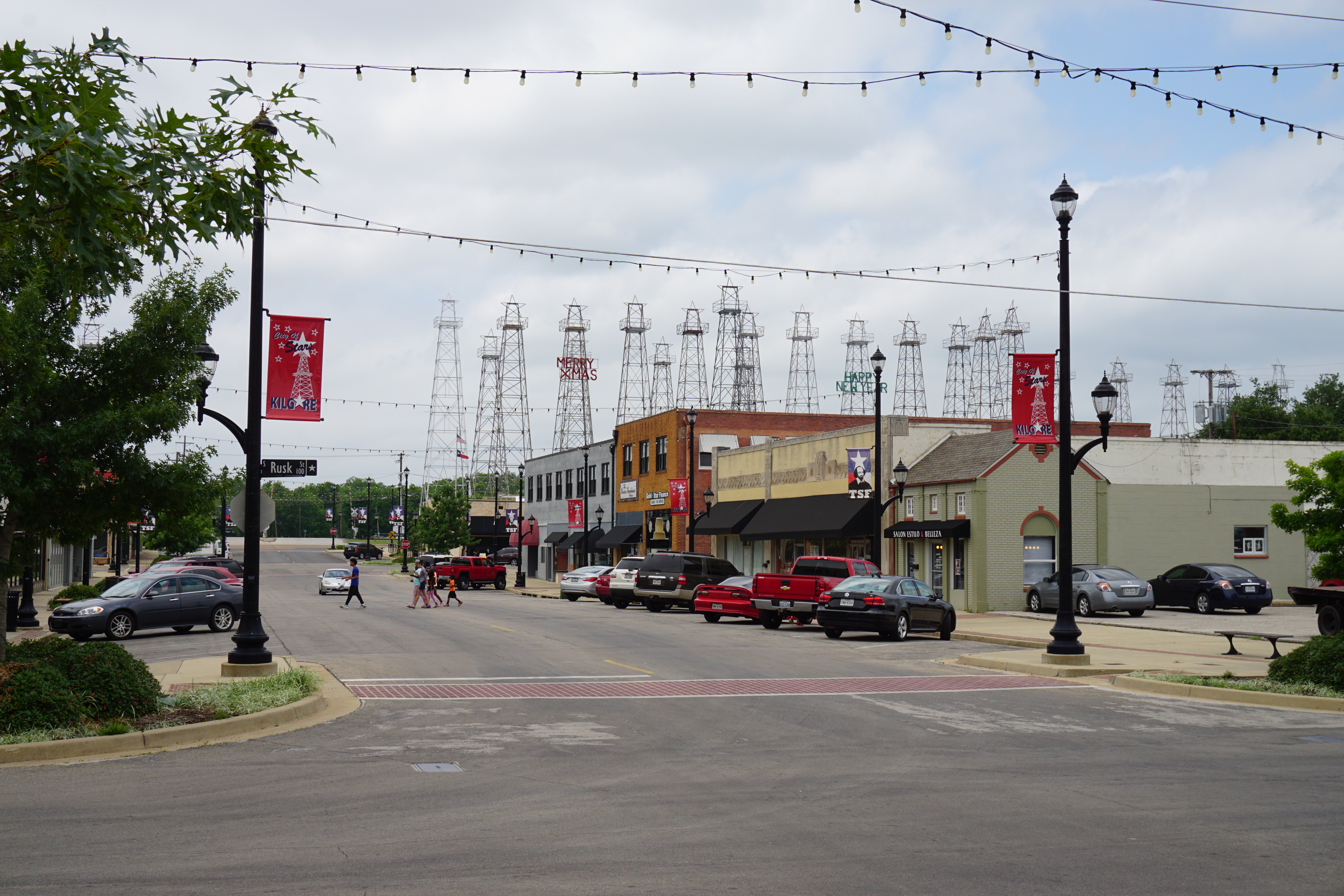
World's Richest Acre Park in Downtown Kilgore, where the greatest concentration of oil wells in the world once stood along with the downtown beautifully preserved.

Historic preservation (US), built heritage preservation or built heritage conservation (UK) is an endeavor that seeks to preserve, conserve and protect buildings, objects, landscapes or other artifacts of historical significance. It is a philosophical concept that became popular in the twentieth century, which maintains that cities as products of centuries' development should be obligated to protect their patrimonial legacy. The term refers specifically to the preservation of the built environment, and not to preservation of, for example, primeval forests or wilderness.

== History ==
=== France ===
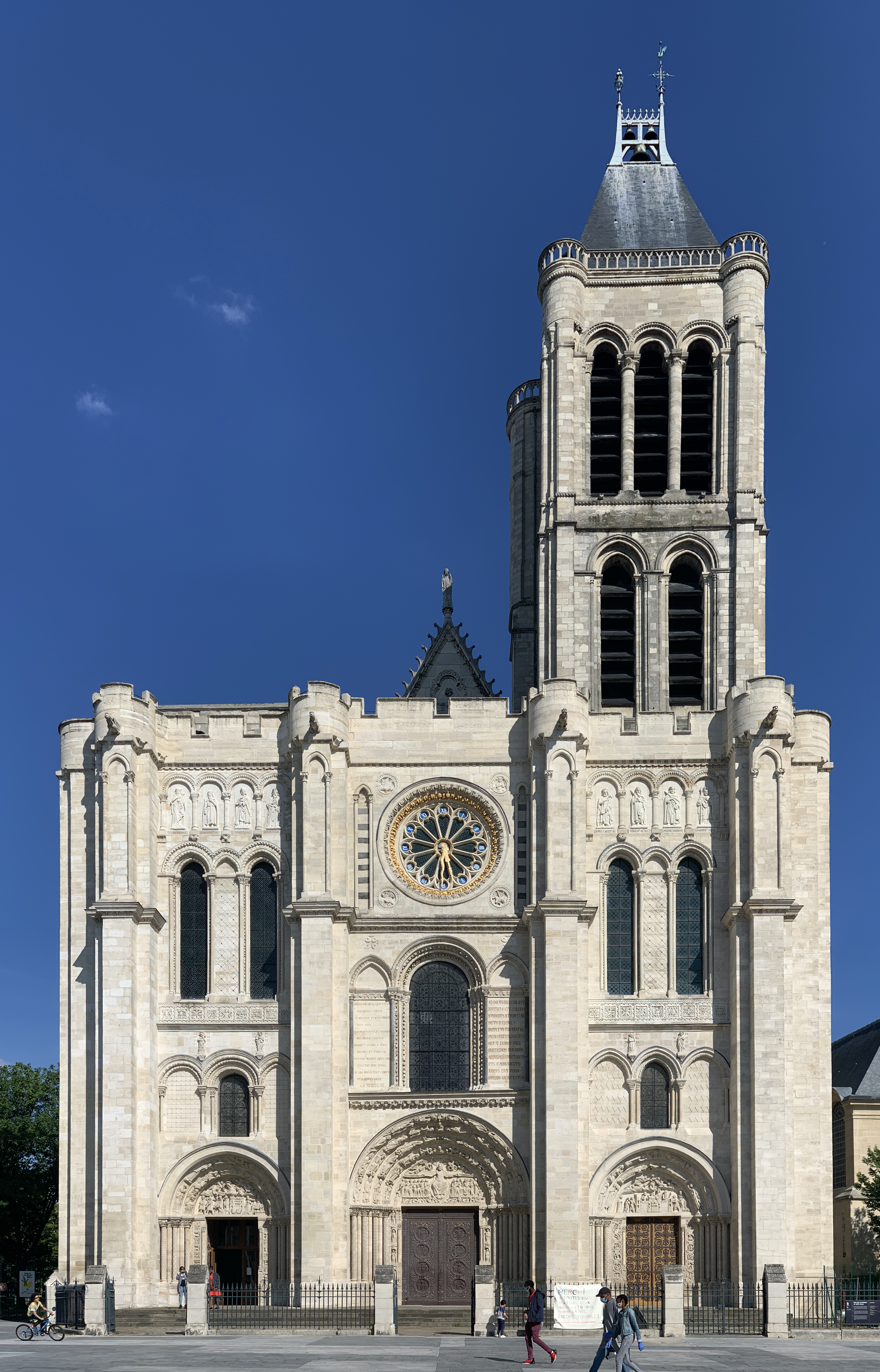
The Basilica of Saint-Denis, which was among the first buildings to be registered by the conseil des bâtiments civils and subsequently among the first to be registered as a monument historique.

In 1790, Aubin-Louis Millin submitted a report to the Constituent Assembly regarding the demolition of the Bastille, using the term "monument historique" (transl. historic monument). The idea of preserving sites linked to the Ancien régime and earlier circulated as a result, and under impetus of Talleyrand, the Assembly, on the 13th of October, created the commission des monuments (transl. Commission of Monuments) whose function was to "study the fate of monuments, arts, and sciences." The following year, Alexandre Lenoir was appointed to create the Musée des Monuments français (transl. Museum of French Monuments), which opened in 1795 and exhibited fragments of architecture Lenoir had saved and salvaged from destruction over the previous years. The museum was ultimately closed during the Restoration by Louis XVIII, and its collection was returned to the original owners and their families.

The vandalism and widespread destruction which accompanied the French Revolution had inspired several such responses, and the first known register of such buildings was an inventory of the castles begun by Louis XVI by the conseil des bâtiments civils (transl. Council of Civil Buildings), which was completed in 1795. Between 1804 and 1834, several archaeological societies were formed, notably the Société des antiquaires de France in 1804 (originally the Académie celtique), the Société française d'archéologie in 1834, and the Comité des travaux historiques et scientifiques also in 1834.

In 1819, the Ministry of the Interior provided an allowance for monuments historiques for the first time, and, on 21 October 1830, François Guizot (then Minister of the Interior) proposed the creation of a post, the Inspector General of Historic Monuments, to classify buildings and distribute funds for their preservation. This post was first assigned to Ludovic Vitet on 25 November 1830, and later to Prosper Mérimée on 27 May 1834. In 1837, Bachasson, in his capacity of Minister of the Interior, officially established the Commission des monuments historiques (transl. Commission for Historic Monuments) to carry out the work of classification and producing an inventory, as well as distributing funding and training architects for restoration work (Eugène Viollet-le-Duc among them). The Commission published its first inventory in 1840, and subsequently continued its inventory work, as well as create visual records for any future restoration. To this end, it created the Mission Héliographique to photograph monuments in 1851. During this period, the combination of reluctance to understand the government's prerogatives and the fact that the classification of private property required the owners' consent resulted in the gradual decrease in the number of registered monuments.

On 2 May 1887, a law was passed establishing procedures for the classification of historic monuments as well as establish provisions for a body of Architecte en chef des monuments historiques for their upkeep. In 1906, French law laid down principles of classification of natural sites. Under the 1905 Law of Separation of Church and State, local communities and the government were entrusted with the care and upkeep of religious buildings, however, this led to refusal to care for buildings not of "national interest" by some and the auctioning off of heritage by others. Per consequence, on 13 December 1913, a law was passed which widened the field of protection for classified monuments, including changing "national interest" to "public interest" and allowing the classification of private property without the consent of the owner. During the 1920s and 1930s, classification further opened up to private property; additionally, monuments post-dating the Ancien régime began to be classified. In 1925, a second order of classification was introduced: inscription à l'inventaire supplémentaire des monuments historiques (transl. inscription in the supplementary inventory of historical monuments).

In 1930, the classifications were renamed "classé" and "inscrit" (transl. "classified" and "registered") and classification was allowed to include the land immediately surrounding a classified building. During the Nazi Occupation, numerous classifications were made both in order to prevent destruction of monuments and to provide some protection from compulsory labour.

=== United Kingdom ===
In England, antiquarian interests were a familiar gentleman's pursuit since the mid 17th century, developing in tandem with the rise in scientific curiosity. Fellows of the Royal Society were often also Fellows of the Society of Antiquaries.

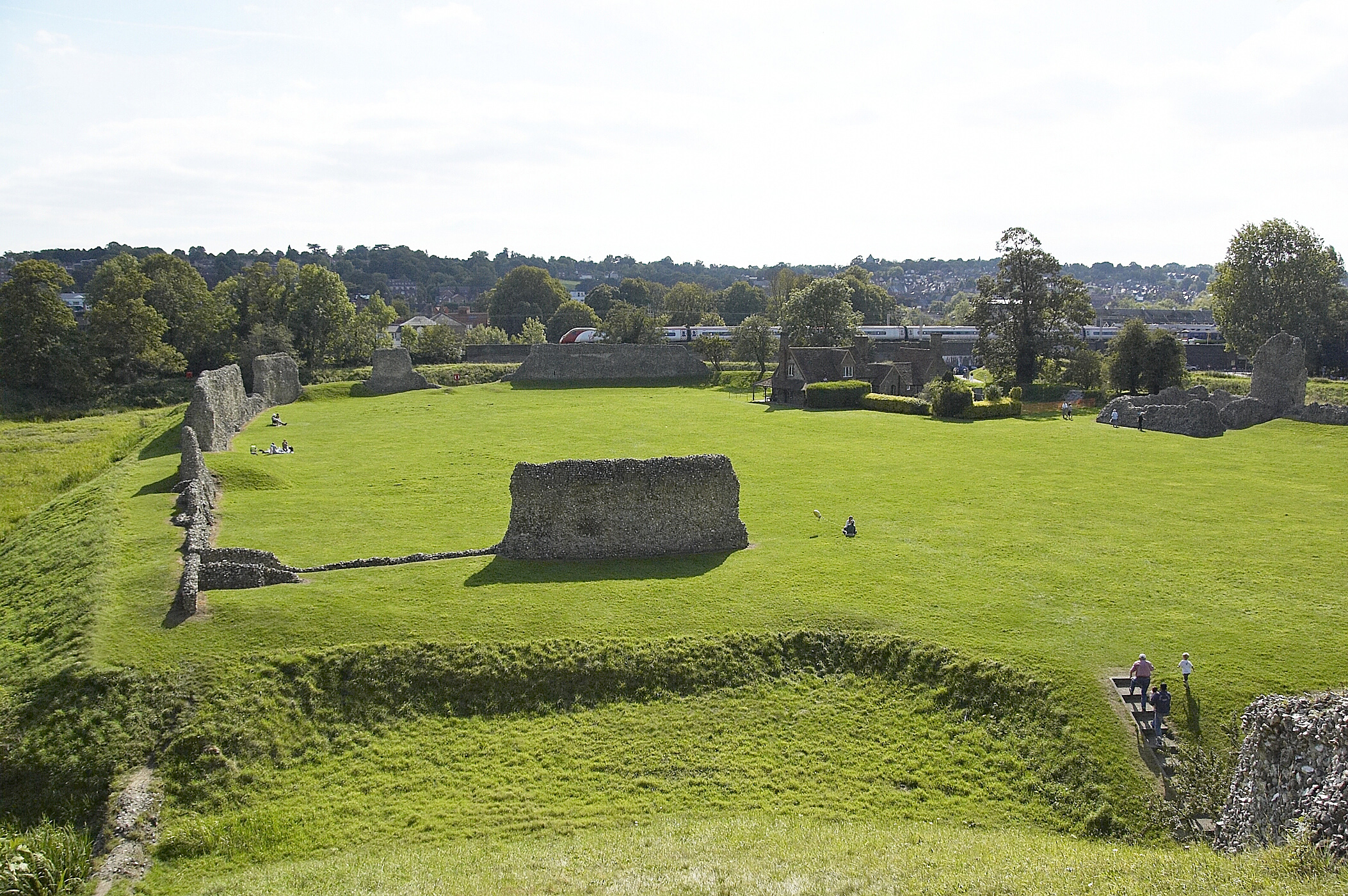
The ruins of Berkhamsted castle (viewed from its Norman motte) and Berkhamsted Common were the location of two successful early preservation events in the nineteenth century.

Many historic sites were damaged as the railways began to spread across the UK, these sites included Trinity Hospital and its church in Edinburgh, Furness Abbey, Berwick and Northampton Castle, as well as the ancient walls of York, Chester and Newcastle. In 1833 Berkhamsted Castle became the first historic site in England to be officially protected by statute, under the London and Birmingham Railway Acts of 1833–1837, though the new railway line in 1834 did demolish the castle's gatehouse and outer earthworks to the south.

In 1847 the Shakespeare Birthplace Trust was formed by a local act of Parliament, the Shakespeare Birthplace, &c., Trust Act 1891 (54 & 55 Vict. c. iii), to prevent the Stratford property's sale to American showman P. T. Barnum.

Another early preservation event also occurred at Berkhamsted. In 1866, Lord Brownlow who lived at Ashridge House, tried to enclose the adjoining Berkhamsted Common with 5-foot (2 m) steel fences in an attempt to claim it as part of his estate. In England from early Anglo-Saxon times, Common land was an area of land which the local community could use as a resource. Across England between 1660 and 1845, 7 million acres of Common land had been enclosed by private land owners by application to parliament. On the night of 6 March 1866, Augustus Smith MP led gangs of local folk and hired men from London's East End in direct action to break the enclosure fences and protect Berkhamsted Common for the people of Berkhamsted in what became known nationally as the Battle of Berkhamsted Common. In 1870, Sir Robert Hunter (later co-founder of the National Trust in 1895) and the Commons Preservation Society succeed in legal action that ensured protection of Berkhamsted Common and other open spaces threatened with enclosure. In 1926 the common was acquired by the National Trust.

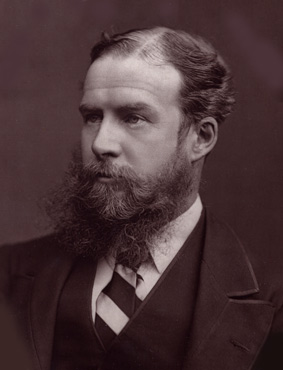
John Lubbock, MP was a moving force behind the implementation of the Ancient Monuments Protection Act 1882.

By the mid 19th century, much of Britain's unprotected cultural heritage was being slowly destroyed. Even well-meaning archaeologists like William Greenwell excavated sites with virtually no attempt at their preservation, Stonehenge came under increasing threat by the 1870s. Tourists were chipping off parts of the stones or carving their initials into the rock. The private owners of the monument decided to sell the land to the London and South-Western Railway who stated that the monument was "not the slightest use to anyone now". John Lubbock, an MP and botanist emerged as the champion of the country's national heritage. In 1872 he personally bought private land that housed ancient monuments in Avebury, Silbury Hill and elsewhere, from the owners who were threatening to have them cleared away to make room for housing. Soon, he began campaigning in Parliament for legislation to protect monuments from destruction. This finally led to the legislative milestone under the Liberal government of William Gladstone of the Ancient Monuments Protection Act 1882. The first government appointed inspector for this job was the archaeologist Augustus Pitt-Rivers. This legislation was regarded by conservative political elements as a grave assault on the individual rights of property of the owner, and consequently, the inspector only had the power to identify endangered landmarks and offer to purchase them from the owner with his consent. The Act only covered ancient monuments and explicitly did not cover historic buildings or structures. In 1877 the Society for the Protection of Ancient Buildings was founded by the Arts and Crafts designer William Morris to prevent the destruction of historic buildings, followed by the National Trust in 1895 that bought estates from their owners for preservation.

The Ancient Monuments Protection Act 1882 had only given legal protection to prehistoric sites, such as ancient tumuli. The Ancient Monuments Protection Act 1900 took this further by empowering the government's Commissioners of Work and local County Councils to protect a wider range of properties. Further updates were made in 1910.

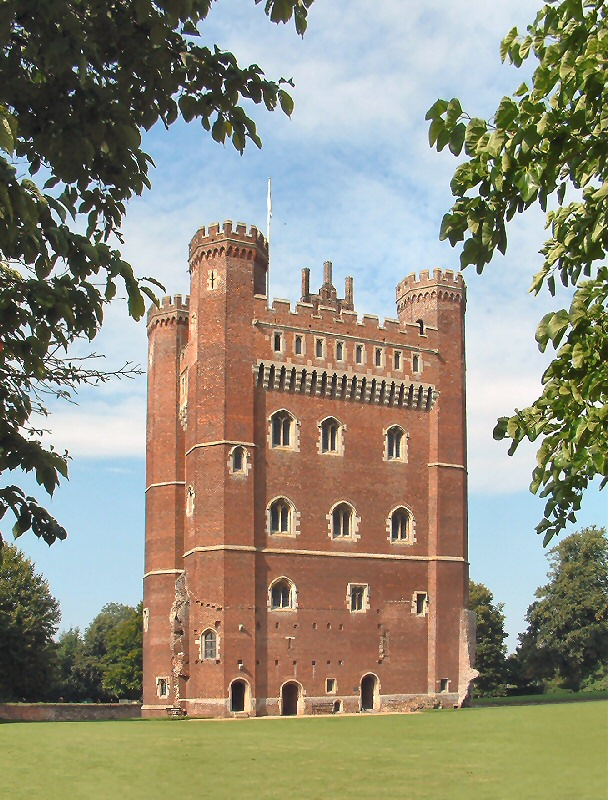
Tattershall Castle, preserved at personal expense by Lord Curzon and a catalyst for broader heritage protection laws.

Tattershall Castle, Lincolnshire, a medieval manor house had been put up for sale in 1910 with its greatest treasures, the huge medieval fireplaces, still intact. However, when an American bought the house they were ripped out and packaged up for shipping. The former viceroy of India, George Curzon, 1st Marquess Curzon of Kedleston, was outraged at this cultural destruction and stepped in to buy back the castle and reinstall the fireplaces. After a nationwide hunt for them they were finally found in London and returned. He restored the castle and left it to the National Trust on his death in 1925. His experience at Tattershall influenced Lord Curzon to push for tougher heritage protection laws in Britain, which saw passage as the Ancient Monuments Consolidation and Amendment Act 1913.

The new structure involved the creation of the Ancient Monuments Board to oversee the protection of such monuments. Powers were given to the board, with Parliamentary approval, to issue preservation orders to protect monuments, and extended the public right of access to these. The term "monument" was extended to include the lands around it, allowing the protection of the wider landscape.

==== The National Trust ====
The National Trust was founded in 1894 by Octavia Hill, Sir Robert Hunter, and Hardwicke Canon Rawnsley as the first organisation of its type in the world. Its formal purpose is:

The preservation for the benefit of the Nation of lands and tenements (including buildings) of beauty or historic interest and, as regards lands, for the preservation of their natural aspect, features and animal and plant life. Also the preservation of furniture, pictures and chattels of any description having national and historic or artistic interest.

In the early days, the Trust was concerned primarily with protecting open spaces and a variety of threatened buildings. Its first acquisition was Dinas Oleu, a piece of land on the clifftop above Barmouth in Wales, donated in 1895. Two other sites acquired by the Trust in its early years later became nature reserves: Wicken Fen in Cambridgeshire and Blakeney Point in Norfolk. White Barrow on Salisbury Plain was the Trust's first archaeological monument, purchased in 1909 for £60. The focus on country houses and gardens, which now comprise the majority of its most visited properties, came about in the mid 20th century, when it was realised that the private owners of many of these properties were no longer able to afford to maintain them.

==== English Heritage ====
English Heritage formed in 1983, is a registered charity that looks after the National Heritage Collection in England. This comprises over 400 of England's historic buildings, monuments and sites spanning more than 5,000 years of history. Within its portfolio are Stonehenge, Dover Castle, Tintagel Castle and the best preserved parts of Hadrian's Wall.

Originally English Heritage was the operating name of an executive non-departmental public body of the British Government, officially titled the Historic Buildings and Monuments Commission for England, that ran the national system of heritage protection and managed a range of historic properties. It was created to combine the roles of existing bodies that had emerged from a long period of state involvement in heritage protection. In 1999 the organisation merged with the Royal Commission on the Historical Monuments of England and the National Monuments Record (England), bringing together resources for the identification and survey of England's historic environment. On 1 April 2015, English Heritage was divided into two parts: Historic England, which inherited the statutory and protection functions of the old organisation, and the new English Heritage Trust, a charity that would operate the historic properties, and which took on the English Heritage operating name and logo. The British government gave the new charity an £80 million grant to help establish it as an independent trust, although the historic properties remained in the ownership of the state.

The Town and Country Planning Acts of 1944 and 1947 established the listing of buildings of special architectural or historic interest; by 2017 there were 377,700 listed buildings on the National Heritage List for England, which is maintained by Historic England.

=== Netherlands ===
Victor de Stuers is widely considered the man who started historic preservation in the Netherlands. In 1875, the first national department for conservation was established and de Stuers was appointed as the first legal secretary at the Ministry of Home Affairs as chief of the brand new Department of Arts and Sciences. He was the driving force behind Monumentenzorg (Foundation for Historic Preservation), helped found the Rijksmuseum (National Museum) and the Rijksarchief (National Archives).

However, it was not until the 20th century that there was national legislation on historic preservation. In 1961 the Monumentenwet ("Monuments Act") was passed. It defined that any physical building or space that was at least fifty years old and "which are of general interest because of their beauty, their meaning to science or their social value" and must thus be preserved. In 1988 this Act was replaced by the Monumentenwet 1988 ("Monuments Act 1988") and in 2015 by the Erfgoedwet ("Heritage Law").

In 1973, the NGO Monumentenwacht ("Monument Watch") was founded with the purpose of providing preventative measures of maintenance for historic buildings. As the majority of the historic preservation programs in the Netherlands, this program is decentralized, managed on the provincial level. Owners of heritage buildings can subscribe to the services of Monumentenwacht and receive regular visits for inspection. The costs are covered through a combination of national and provincial subsidies.

A special kind of preservation that takes place in the Netherlands is the preservation of maritime heritage. Maritime trade was the Dutch specialty which shaped much of their culture and as a country that is 50% under sea level the Dutch history is closely intertwined with water. There are maritime museums in both Amsterdam and Rotterdam that tell the story of the Dutch maritime heritage, but there is not much legal documentation on how to preserve it. For example, according to Sarah Dromgoole, shipwrecks from The Dutch East India Company are found all around the world, which are still property of the Netherlands, but the Dutch government rarely takes responsibility for this property that is found outside of their territory.

=== United States ===
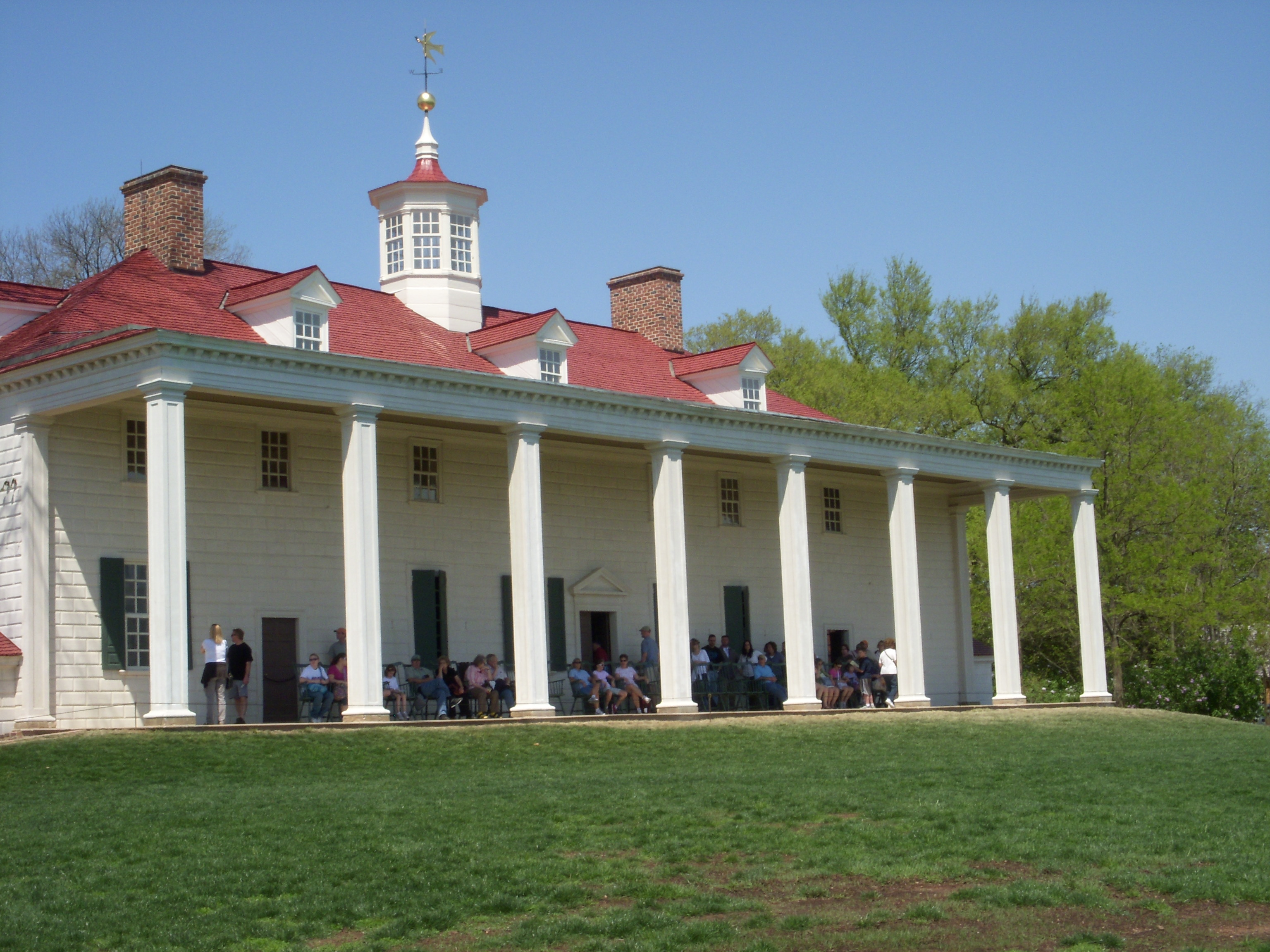
Mount Vernon plantation, near Alexandria, Virginia

In the United States one of the first historic preservation efforts was the Washington's Headquarters State Historic Site, in Newburgh, New York. This property has the distinction of being the first-ever property designated and operated as a historic site by a U.S. state, having been so since 1850.

Another early historic preservation undertaking was that of George Washington's Mount Vernon in 1858. Founded in 1889, the Richmond, Virginia-based Preservation Virginia (formerly known as the Association for the Preservation of Virginia Antiquities) was the United States' first statewide historic preservation group. The American Scenic and Historic Preservation Society was formed in 1895 as the first American organization of its kind in the United States that did not limit its activities to a single historic place or object. The Society operated as a national organization to: protect the natural scenery and the preservation of historic landmarks; to preserve landmarks and records of the past or present; to erect memorials and promote appreciation of the scenic beauty of America.

Charles E. Peterson was an influential figure in the mid-20th century establishing the Historic American Buildings Survey (HABS), advising on the establishment of Independence National Historical Park, helping with the first graduate degree program in historic preservation in the United States at Columbia University, and an author.

The architectural firm of Simons & Lapham (Albert Simons and Samuel Lapham) was an influential supporter of the nation's first historic preservation ordinance in Charleston, South Carolina in 1930, affording that city a regulatory means by which to prevent the destruction of its historic building stock. In 1925, efforts to preserve the historic buildings of the French Quarter in New Orleans led to the creation of the Vieux Carré Commission and later, to the adoption of a historic preservation ordinance.

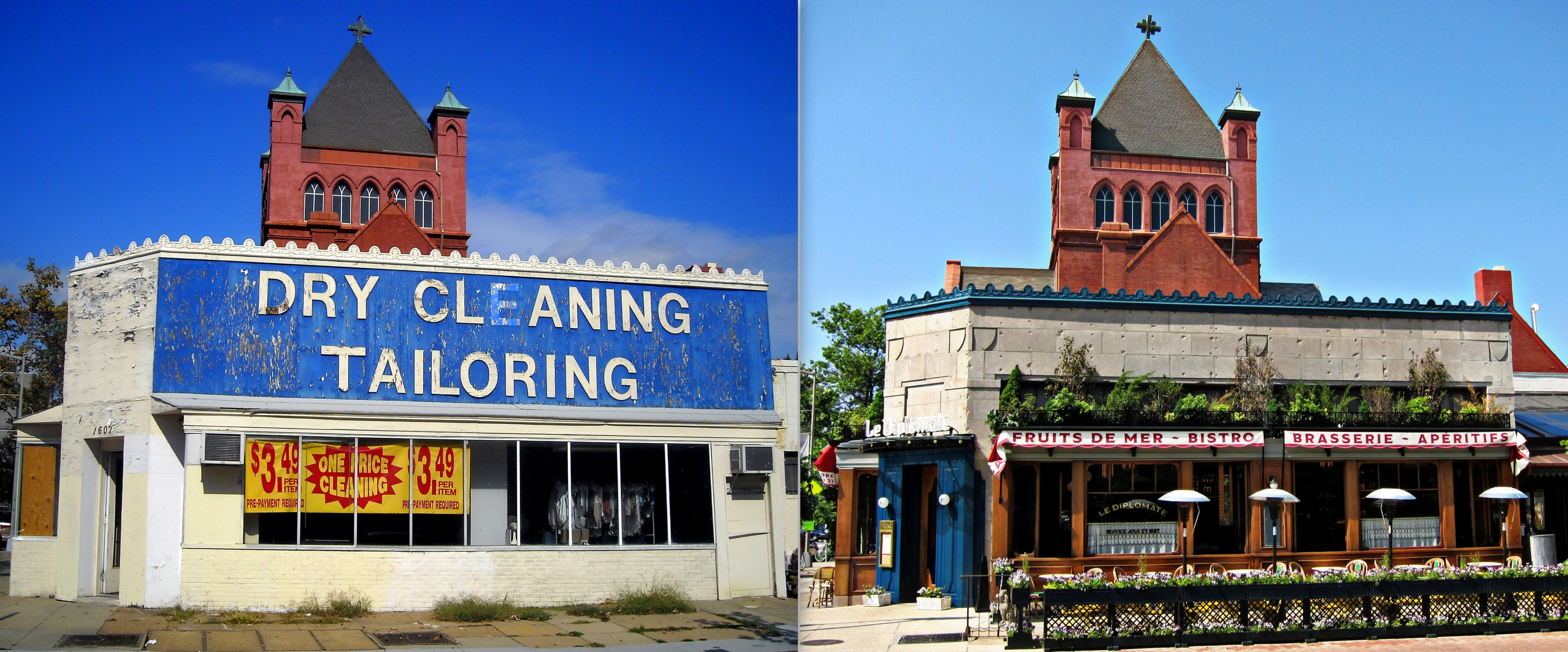
The preservation of this historic building in Washington, D.C., resulted in an award for Excellence in Historic Preservation by the local government.

The US National Trust for Historic Preservation, another privately funded non-profit organization, began in 1949 with a handful of structures and has developed goals that provide "leadership, education, advocacy, and resources to save America's diverse historic places and revitalize our communities" according to the Trust's mission statement. In 1951 the Trust assumed responsibility for its first museum property, Woodlawn Plantation in northern Virginia. Twenty-eight sites in all have subsequently become part of the National Trust, representing the cultural diversity of American history. In New York City, the destruction of Pennsylvania Station in 1964 shocked many nationwide into supporting preservation. The 1960s proved advantageous with new laws and international agreements extending preservation "from ancient monuments to whole districts and buildings a few decades old." On an international level, the New York-based World Monuments Fund was founded in 1965 to preserve historic sites all over the world.

Under the direction of James Marston Fitch, the first advanced-degree historic preservation program began at Columbia University in 1964. It became the model on which most other graduate historic preservation programs were created. Many other programs were to follow before 1980: M.A. in Preservation Planning from Cornell (1975); M.S. in Historic Preservation from the University of Vermont (1975); M.S. in Historic Preservation Studies from Boston University (1976); M.S. in Historic Preservation from Eastern Michigan University (1979) and M.F.A. in Historic Preservation was one of the original programs at Savannah College of Art & Design. James Marston Fitch also offered guidance and support towards the founding of the Master of Preservation Studies Degree within the Tulane School of Architecture in 1996. The M.Sc. in Building Conservation degree program is offered by the School of Architecture at Rensselaer Polytechnic Institute in Troy, New York. In 2005, Clemson University and the College of Charleston created an M.S. degree program based in Charleston, SC. The first undergraduate programs (B.A.) appeared in 1977 from Goucher College and Roger Williams University (then called Roger Williams College), followed by Mary Washington College in 1979. As of 2013 there were more than fifty historic preservation programs offering certificates, associate, bachelor's, and master's degrees in the United States. Under the direction of Jorge Otero-Pailos, the first PhD in Historic Preservation in the United States was founded at Columbia Graduate School of Architecture, Planning and Preservation in 2018. A deed can also be altered to ensure that future owners maintain the historic character of the structure.

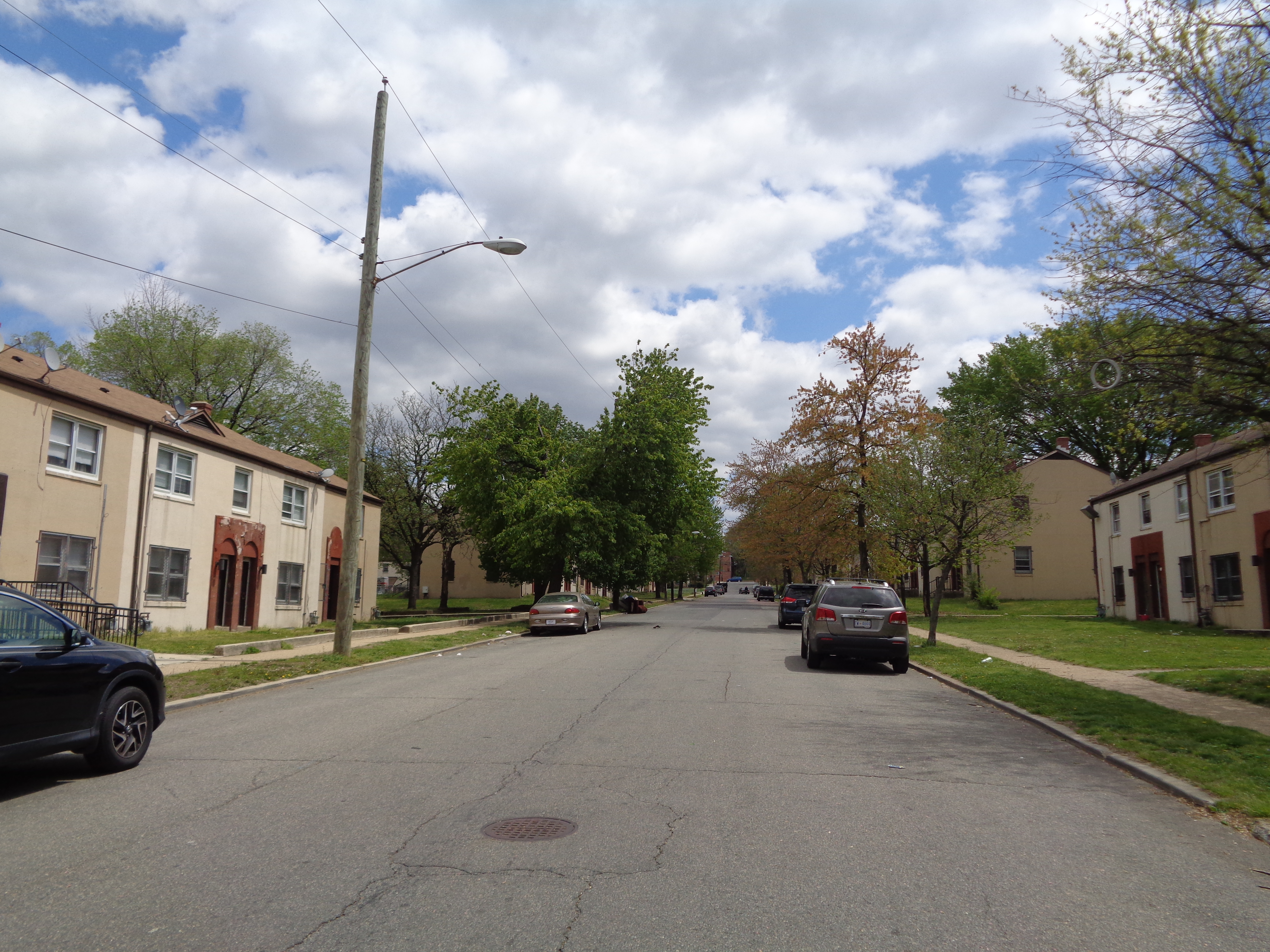
Today, historic preservation often concerns itself with everyday, vernacular landscapes associated with marginalized communities, such as Barry Farm in Washington, DC (pictured here), as much as it does monumental properties.

==== National Register of Historic Places ====
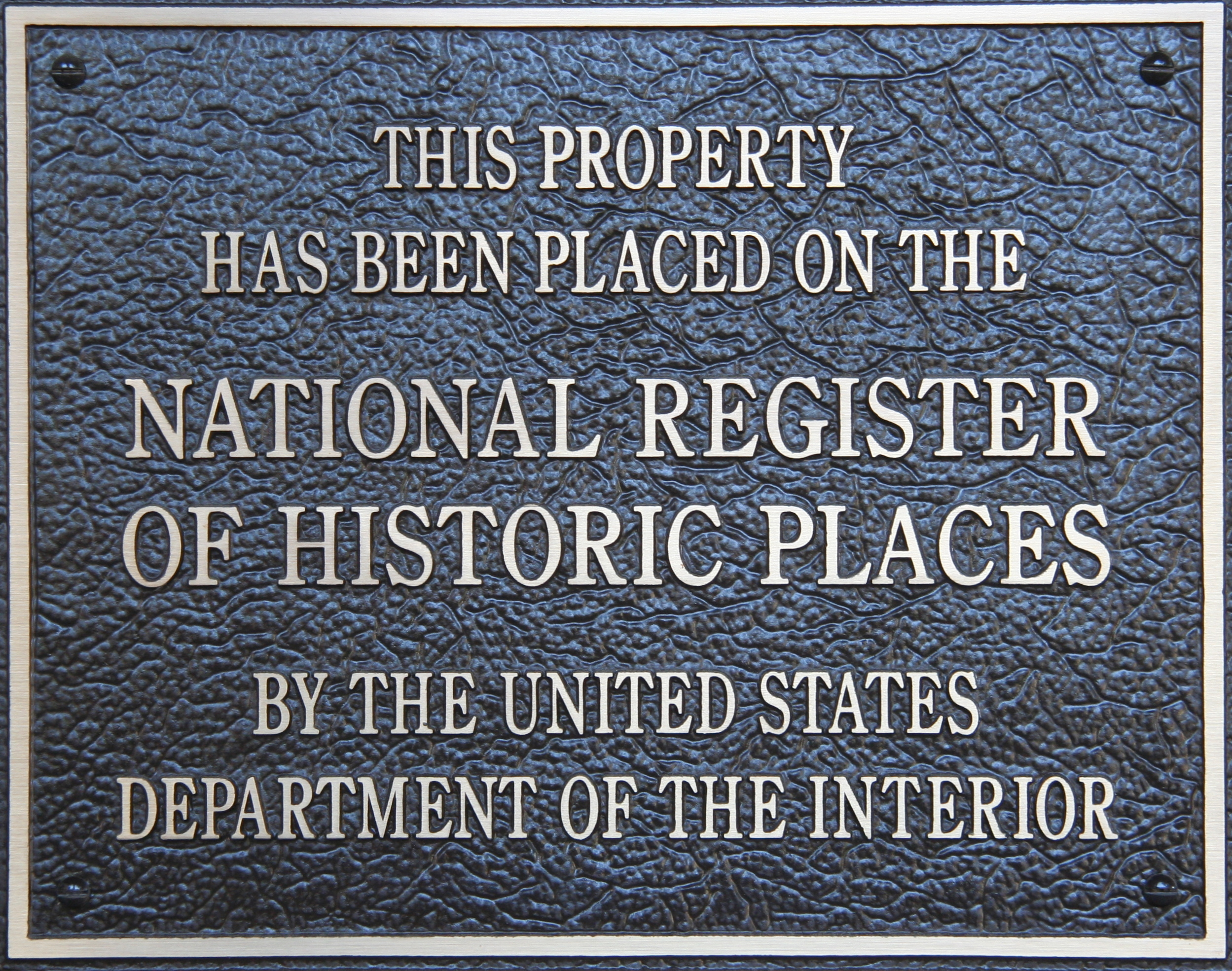
National Register of Historic Places plaque

==== Historic districts ====
A historic district in the United States is a group of buildings, properties, or sites that have been designated by one of several entities on different levels as historically or architecturally significant. Buildings, structures, objects and sites within a historic district are normally divided into two categories, contributing and non-contributing. Districts greatly vary in size, some having hundreds of structures while others have just a few.

The U.S. federal government designates historic districts through the U.S. Department of Interior, under the auspices of the National Park Service. Federally designated historic districts are listed on the National Register of Historic Places. Historic districts allows rural areas to preserve their characters through historic preservation programs. These include "Main Street" programs that can be used to redevelop rural downtowns. Using historic preservation programs as an economic development tool for local governments in rural areas has enabled some of those areas to take advantage of their history and develop a tourism market that in turn provides funds for maintaining an economic stability that these areas would not have seen otherwise.

A similar concept exists in the United Kingdom: a Conservation area is designated in accordance with the Planning (Listed Buildings and Conservation Areas) Act 1990 in order to protect a zone in which there are buildings of architectural or cultural heritage interest.

==== National Parks ====
The Department of the Interior designated several areas of Morristown, New Jersey as the first historic park in the United States national park system. It became designated as the Morristown National Historical Park. The community had permanent settlements that date to 1715, is termed the military capital of the American Revolution, and contains many designations of sites and locations. The park includes three major sites in Morristown.

In the United Kingdom, James Bryce the ambassador to the US praised the system of National Parks and campaigned to have them introduced in Great Britain. Little came of it until mounting public pressure during the early 20th century from the Ramblers' Association and other groups led to the National Parks and Access to the Countryside Act 1949.

==== Areas of paid professional practice ====
As of 2018 in the United States, about 70% of professional, paid practice in historic preservation is in the area of regulatory compliance, which is driven by laws, regulations, and guidelines promulgated at the federal, state, and local levels. At the federal level, these include the National Historic Preservation Act of 1966 and associated regulations, such as Section 106, National Register of Historic Places, and the Secretary of the Interior's Standards; many states have laws that reference these federal regulations or create parallel regulations, using federal regulatory language. At the local level, preservation laws and regulations are known as "preservation ordinances" and define the need for private property owners to seek a "certificate of appropriateness" when making modifications to existing buildings that are listed in a local historical register.

Areas of professional, paid practice in historic preservation in the United States
Area of practice	Percent (out of 100%)
Regulatory compliance (federal, state, and local)	69.7%
Architecture and construction	11.2%
Historic sites/museums	8.9%
Preservation advocacy	5.7%
Downtown revitalization	4.5%

=== Australia ===
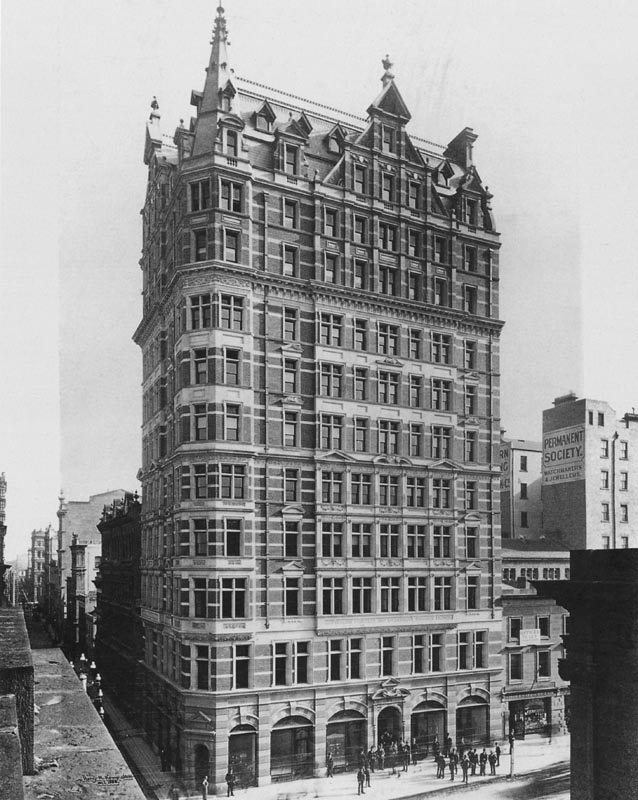
Melbourne's APA Building was constructed in Queen Anne style in 1889 and demolished in 1981.

All of Australia's major cities have had historic or heritage preservation establishments and legislation in place since the mid to late 1970s, though destruction or outright demolition of historic buildings continues in most Australian cities to this day, subject to council or planning approval, particularly outside of the city centres in historic neighbourhoods. Melbourne was founded in 1835 and grew enormously in wealth and prosperity following the 1850s gold rush, which resulted in a construction boom: large edifices were erected to serve as public buildings such as libraries, court houses, schools, churches, and offices. This led to a period where Melbourne became known as "Marvellous Melbourne", boasting the largest collection of Victorian architecture outside of England. However, in the years that followed, and as the thousands of Australian soldiers arrived back from the battlefields following the end of World War I there emerged a sense of renewed pride and a willingness to forget the dark days of war and distance Australian from its Victorian origins, considered "unfashionable" or "outdated" by some. The Council of the City of Melbourne was no doubt buoyed by this new nationalistic pride and put in place schemes to modernize the city which included increasing the building height limit and removing some of the Victorian era cast ironwork.

In the years leading up to World War II the Whelan the Wrecker firm had already pulled down thousands of structures in both the city and surrounding suburbs, as Melbourne became particularly conscious of International Modernism. James Paul Whelan's obituary of 1938 suggests that his company had the task of demolishing up to 98% of buildings marked for removal in the city alone. The rise of this International Modernism saw a new approach that valued replacing older, elaborate inefficient buildings with new ones. An early example of this was a City of Melbourne by-law in 1954 that mandated the demolition of all posted cast-iron verandas, thought to be dangerous as well as old fashioned, in order to 'clean up' the city before the 1956 Summer Olympics.

Sydney (Australia's oldest city) was also affected by the International Modernism period and also suffered an extensive loss of its Victorian architecture, something that subsisted well into the 1980s. From the 1950s onwards, many of Sydney's handsome sandstone and masonry buildings were wiped away by architects and developers who built "brown concrete monstrosities" in their place. The 1980s saw "uncomfortable pastiches of facades with no coherence and little artistic merit". Green bans in Australian cities such as Sydney and Melbourne came into effect in the 1970s and the Australian Heritage Commission (AHS), was established by the Federal Government in 1975 by the Australian Heritage Commission Act 1975 as the first body to manage natural and cultural heritage in Australia until its demise in 2004. It was responsible for the Register of the National Estate. The Australian National Heritage List was established in 2003. Controversy arose in 2016 in Melbourne after the historic Corkman Irish Pub was illegally demolished overnight, resulting in the State Planning Minister pursuing an order (via the Victorian Administrative Appeals Tribunal) for the two-story pub to be rebuilt. The site owners were fined AUD$1.325 million after pleading guilty to the process.

In the city of Adelaide, large public protests erupted in the 1980s regarding the 1983 campaign to save the Aurora Hotel in Hindmarsh Square, which had been recommended for listing on the city heritage register but refused because the site was to be redeveloped. The protest led to the emergence of Aurora Heritage Action, Inc. (AHA), which became the most vocal heritage lobby group in Adelaide during the decade, often working in cooperation with residents' associations and later the National Trust. While governments were urged to protect the traditional character of Adelaide, capital became more widely available for development. The large increase in property development from 1987 increased opposition to further demolition of Adelaide's historic buildings. Local councils and lobbyists alike aimed to expand the horizon of heritage to protect historic precincts across the city, even if buildings within those precincts did not warrant heritage listing. The Bannon government slowly responded to public demand and introduced historic (conservation) zones through a revision to the Planning Act (1982) in 1989. Not regulated by the Planning Act, the City of Adelaide endeavoured to create on a similar scheme, which became known as the townscape initiative, facilitating one of the most destructive political debates in the council's history.

=== Canada ===
In Canada, the phrase "heritage preservation" is sometimes seen as a specific approach to the treatment of historic places and sites, rather than a general concept of conservation. "Conservation" is taken as the more general term, referring to all actions or processes that are aimed at safeguarding the character-defining elements of a cultural resource so as to retain its heritage value and extend its physical life.

As of 2025, the Canadian Register of Historic Places lists more than 13,000 historic places recognised at the federal, provincial, territorial and municipal levels.

Historic objects in Canada may be granted special designation by any of the three levels of government: the federal government, the provincial government, or a municipal government. The Heritage Canada Foundation acts as Canada's lead advocacy organization for heritage buildings and landscapes.

=== Israel ===
In Israel, there are currently two laws concerning historic preservation, Antiquities Law of the State of Israel (1978) and Planning and Building Law (1965). Both laws were adapted from the British law that was implemented during the British Mandate of Palestine.

However, these laws are not comprehensive and limited in scope: the Antiquities Law only applies itself to buildings or artifacts dated before 1700 BC. So while efforts discovering and protecting anything older than 1700 BC are well protected, anything from later historical periods is not under the protection of this law. The Planning and Building Law discusses the overall management and regulation of land use in Israel. It has been through several changes and amendments specifically regarding preservation, but over the years it hasn't been enforced and many historical sites were destroyed, as the state was prioritizing developmental and economic interests.

During the 1960s, the issue of preservation was gaining public awareness, and as a response to the destruction of Herzliya Hebrew Gymnasium (one of the first educational institutions in Israel) in 1959, a wave of shock and anger led to extensive public debate.

In 1984, The Council for Conservation of Heritage Sites in Israel was established, at the recommendation of the Knesset and the Committee of Education. Its aims include locating remains of historic settlements, protect and conserve them as well as developing conservation principles that are specific to Israel's historic situations and are aligned with international standards. The council used to operate under the Society for the Protection of Nature in Israel but in 2008 registers as an independent non-profit. Today, it is the organization responsible for the most historical preservation endeavors as well as efforts to add amendments to existing laws to provide a comprehensive and effective framework for preservation in Israel.

A different, separate effort in preservation comes from the Israeli Defense Force (IDF). The IDF surveyed 94 military bases and found that about 80 of them include sites worth preserving, and for each of these bases there is a preservation plan. The IDF is working towards maintaining these building as well as communicating their value to the soldiers in these bases. Buildings include Knights Templar sites, old military bases used by the British or German or buildings from the Ottoman period.

=== North Macedonia ===
In North Macedonia, historic preservation falls under the overarching category of cultural heritage preservation according to the Law on Protection of Cultural Heritage (Закон за заштита на културното наследство). According to this law, which the Macedonian Parliament approved in March 2004, there are three types of cultural heritage: immovable, movable, and intangible. Historical preservation is represented by the protection of monuments and monumental entireties under immovable cultural heritage, and historical items under movable cultural heritage.

Although this law was the first nationwide establishment of regulations for historic preservation since North Macedonia gained independence from Yugoslavia on September 8, 1991, several organizations throughout the 20th century have encompassed efforts of historic preservation.

The "Central office for protection of cultural monuments and natural rarities of the Socialist Republic of Macedonia" has existed since 1949. In 1960, the Central Office was renamed to "National office for protection of cultural monuments", and granted the status of an independent cultural institution, with authority to execute activities of historic preservation. After the establishment of the Law on Protection of Cultural Heritage in 2004, the Ministry of Culture once again renamed the office to "National center for conservation" and narrowed down its responsibilities to dealing solely with preservation of immovable cultural heritage.

Other organizations which have contributed to the efforts of historic preservation are the Macedonian National Committee of ICOMOS and the NI Institute for Protection of Monuments of Culture and Museum-Ohrid.

The International Council on Monuments and Sites (ICOMOS) established their branch in North Macedonia in 1995 through the initiative of 43 conservationists from Macedonia. The guiding principles of the Macedonian National Committee of ICOMOS are raising the national consciousness about the importance of historic and cultural heritage, decentralization of the discourse about heritage, and effective monitoring of the status of cultural and historic heritage in the country.

The NI Institute for Protection of Monuments of Culture and Museum – Ohrid is the second oldest institutions for historical preservation established in 1952. In 1956 the institute was granted authority to protect movable and immovable cultural and historic heritage in the Ohrid region. The institute has since executed numerous efforts for historic preservation, most notably aiding the recognition of the city of Ohrid as a UNESCO site of cultural heritage in 1979.

Today, the main authority for historic preservation is the Cultural Heritage Protection Office (Управа за заштита на културно наследство). The Office is an independent governmental organization under the Ministry of Culture, divided into three departments:

1. Identification, Protection and Use of Cultural Heritage
2. Prevention and Supervision
3. Documentation, International Cooperation and Administrative Affairs

=== South Korea ===
South Korea’s modern heritage protection framework developed around the Cultural Property Protection Act of 1962. In May 2024, the Cultural Heritage Administration was renamed the Korea Heritage Service as part of a reform that replaced the overarching terminology of “cultural property” with “national heritage” and introduced a classification encompassing cultural, natural, and intangible heritage.

At the municipal level, preservation has included programmes to retain traditional Korean houses, known as hanok, within changing urban neighbourhoods. In Seoul, the metropolitan government supports the repair and renovation of hanok through grants and loans in areas including Bukchon, the neighbourhood west of Gyeongbokgung Palace, Insa-dong, and Donhwamun-ro. It also purchases and repairs buildings for cultural uses and administers district planning, surveys, repair guidance, and public-private governance programmes for hanok neighbourhoods.

The conservation of inhabited historic districts gave rise to tensions between maintaining architectural character, supporting contemporary residential needs, and accommodating tourism. In a comparative study of Bukchon Hanok Village and Yangdong Village, architectural researcher Hyunchul Youn found that the conversion of Bukchon’s houses into cafés, galleries, and guesthouses had increasingly oriented the neighbourhood towards tourist consumption. In Yangdong, the study identified a different tension: controls intended to preserve traditional architectural forms could restrict adaptation to residents’ changing needs. The study argued that conserving traditional settlements requires attention to their continued use as living environments as well as to their appearance.

=== United Arab Emirates ===
Historic preservation in the United Arab Emirates has included the restoration, reconstruction, and adaptive reuse of historic urban districts. Al Fahidi in Dubai and the Heart of Sharjah are examples of initiatives that combine architectural conservation with cultural activities and tourism. Work in Al Fahidi has included the restoration and reconstruction of courtyard houses and wind-tower architecture, with buildings adapted for museums, galleries, cafés, and other uses. In Sharjah, conservation and reconstruction have drawn on archaeological evidence, historical maps and photographs, and oral histories to restore elements of the historic urban fabric, including merchant houses, markets, and public buildings.

These projects have also raised questions about the relationship between architectural preservation and the social life of historic districts. A comparative study of Al Fahidi and the Heart of Sharjah found that both integrated heritage conservation into urban development, but identified shortcomings in community participation and assessments of vulnerability. According to Marthya et al, Al Fahidi is more strongly oriented towards tourism and curated heritage experiences, while the Heart of Sharjah incorporated a broader range of cultural activities and traditions. Nevertheless, Marthya et al. found that community involvement in decision-making remained limited in both cases.

Preservation policy has also expanded to encompass modern architecture. In 2024, the UAE issued the National Policy for the Preservation of Modern Architectural Heritage, addressing buildings and sites associated with the country’s modern development. The policy calls for coordinated federal and local protection frameworks, national and local heritage registers, research and documentation, and the integration of preservation into urban planning. It also promotes adaptive reuse. These measures are stated policy objectives rather than evidence that all proposed registers and legal protections have been implemented.

== Considerations ==
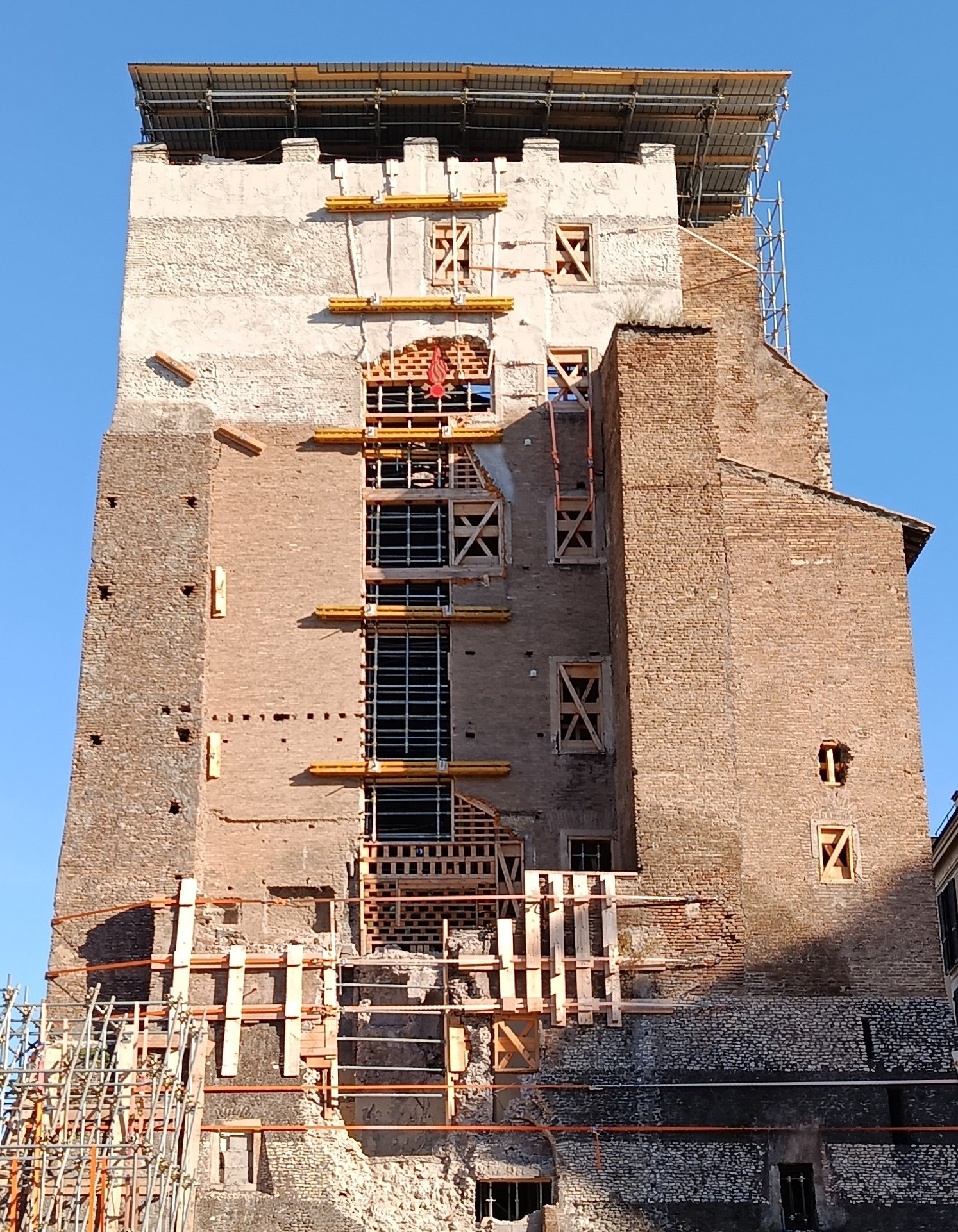
Torre dei Conti, a fortified medieval tower in Rome, suffered partial collapse during renovation works in 2025.

=== Health and aesthetic preference ===
A 2026 study found similar visual preferences for historic buildings as lakes and forests. The study focused only on buildings listed on historic registries in England and found that people on average preferred older buildings, speculating that design standards that emphasized symmetry and other techniques tend to be more pleasing to look at.

=== Natural conditions and aging ===
As a preserved site ages, various natural processes and risks will have their impact on its structures. Many of those have been addressed through history in the traditional construction and preservation methods. Nevertheless, weathering and wearing and other processes can threaten the building over time and should therefore be addressed through monitoring, preventive action and, when necessary, repairs.

Such processes and risks include those stemming from natural conditions (e.g. humidity changes, extreme temperatures, high winds, soil characteristics and ground water), decay of materials (e.g. vegetation and insects, erosion, weathering, structural settling) and natural hazards (e.g. ground movements, landslides, earthquakes and subsidence, flooding, fires and storms). Countermeasures include applying early warning and monitoring technologies and methods, using traditional and modern preventive solutions on site, adequate maintenance with proper skills and disaster preparedness and mitigation measures. Some practical examples include monitoring the building with fire alarm and suppression systems, applying lightning protection systems, following weather reports and preparing for extreme weather conditions, regular inspections and maintenance of building structures, humidity and temperature control with appropriate HVAC systems, and monitoring ground movements, underground humidity and the condition of foundations with ground penetrating radar or electrical resistivity tomography.

=== Demographics of paid professionals, volunteers, and students in the field ===
The historic preservation field in the United States is one of the least diverse, in terms of race and ethnicity, of any of the built environment professions. 99% of preservation practitioners are white; 85% of students in higher education historic preservation programs identify as white/Non-Hispanic, 1.0% identify as American Indian, 2.3% identify as Asian, 2.8% identify as African American, and 6.4% identify as Hispanic or Latino; there are no African American people, indigenous people, and essentially no people of color, who are tenured or tenure track faculty with at least a 50% teaching appointment in historic preservation degree programs (as of 2018); and most people who volunteer in preservation commissions are white.

=== Racial, ethnic, and gender bias in paid historic preservation practice ===
Many historic preservation and cultural resource management scholars, such as Erica Avrami, Sara Bronin, Gail Dubrow, Jamesha Gibson, Ned Kaufman, Thomas King, Michelle Magalong, Kenyatta McLean, Sharon Milholland, Andrea Roberts, and Jeremy Wells, have presented evidence that a significant part of historic preservation practice remains biased toward people who identify as white, male, non-Latino, and who have wealth. This bias is also ingrained in the doctrine, laws, regulations, and guidelines that drive about three-quarters of the paid practice in the field.

=== Lack of research that addresses the practice of historic preservation ===
In the United States, unlike other built environment disciplines (i.e., architecture, planning, interior design, landscape architecture), there is no tradition of intra-disciplinary research in the field that specifically addresses the practice of historic preservation, especially in relation to policy, which is its largest driver of work. Most research by preservation scholars addresses architectural history, but fails to address preservation policy, generally, including diversity, equity, inclusion, and social justice as well as topics related to community engagement and planning.

Noted historic preservation scholar and exception to this rule, Ned Kaufman, refers to this phenomenon as preservation's "resistance to research" in relation to the field's inability to reflect on itself in terms of failures and successes:

I should clarify what I mean by research. I do not mean investigations into architectural or landscape history, or into the chemistry of adhesives or the statics of structures. These studies concern the things on which preservation works, but they do not (except in matters of detail) determine what preservation seeks to do or how. They have little bearing on whether or not we should have a National Register of Historic Places, or tax credits, or programs to address climate change, or on whether local landmark regulations are on the whole too strict or not strict enough, or whether testimony from the public that "We have always lived in this place and like it as it is" should or should not be considered relevant. They tell us little about how well existing policies accomplish their objectives, what unintended impacts they might have, or what options might be preferable. By research, I mean the kinds of investigations that do help answer these and similar questions: research that bears on the policies beneath the preservation enterprise, the assumptions that drive them, the forces that shape them, their impact on the world. Whenever I refer to Resistance to Research, I shall mean specifically this kind of research.

As of 2022, in the US, there has never been a research center, research funding (government, foundation, or otherwise), or program, of any kind, that specifically attempts to provide answers as to the effectiveness of existing preservation policies, unintended impacts of preservation policies, and possible policy alternatives. Some scholars believe that the lack of intra-disciplinary historic preservation research is due to an anti-intellectual bias in the field that privileges exigency and physical interventions over scholarly reflection.

=== Climate change ===
Historic preservation assumes that it is possible to control the physical reality of a building or place through continual interventions in order to sustain the material, form, and meaning associated with such places. Climate change, especially in relation to sea level rise and associated weather events (e.g., hurricanes) threatens many historic buildings and places. In many cases, buildings cannot be saved in place due to these issues; preservation doctrine and, in some cases, regulations, prevents moving buildings to higher ground without an associated loss of historical integrity (or historical authenticity), which present an irreconcilable conundrum that the field has yet to resolve.

=== People-centered preservation ===
In the early 2000s, a series of publications on "values-centered" preservation by the Getty Conservation Institute helped to catalyze a scholarly debate on the underlying values that drive the historic preservation enterprise, especially in relation to the public and policy (e.g., laws, regulations, guidelines). Values-centered preservation was, in turn, preceded by earlier discussions in archaeology, in the 1990s, on the need to move from processual archaeology to postprocessual archaeology. What both of these movements advocate is a move from positivism and scientism in the practice of identifying, interpreting, and preserving/conserving movable and immovable heritage toward more emancipatory ontological orientations centered in the social sciences. People-centered preservation embraces the idea that the values and meanings held by the public for their own heritage, as a form of local knowledge, has as much significance as the values and meanings held by conventionally trained experts, such as architectural historians and archaeologists. People-centered preservation embraces the concept of the "Authorized Heritage Discourse" (AHD), established by Laurajane Smith in her book, Uses of Heritage. The AHD describes a system of communication used in built heritage practice and policy in which "the proper care of heritage, and its associated values, lies with the experts, as it is only they who have the abilities, knowledge and understanding to identify the innate value and knowledge contained at and within historically important sites and places." The AHD forms the core of preservation policy created and sustained by local, state, and federal government.

While the US National Trust for Historic Preservation has publicly embraced people-centered preservation, in the United States, no local, state, or federal agency has issued any publications, guidance, or recommendations related to people-centered preservation and there have been no policy changes. In the UK, however, in 2000, the Secretary of State for Culture Media and Sport and the Secretary of State for the Environment, Transport and the Regions published The Power of Place, which began to open policy discussions around values-based preservation and the introduction of social science concepts in built heritage conservation practice. This was followed by Heritage Protection for the 21st Century, published by the Department for Culture, Media and Sport, which continued to refine policy reform arguments in the treatment of the historic environment in the UK. These publications, and the resulting public debate, did result in some policy changes that the UK government made to move practice related to the conservation of the historic environment toward a people-centered orientation.

=== Other challenges ===
Although preservation efforts can have benefits for the owners of historical buildings, such as tax cuts and subsidies, there are also drawbacks.

One such drawback is that after a neighborhood has been designated to be historically preserved, there is less construction. On the long term this can affect the value of property and investment in housing, both in the neighborhood itself and the neighborhoods directly surrounding it.

A second concern that has been raised is that buildings that need to be historically preserved are sometimes still inhabited. In some cases their inability to make changes to the building can lead to dangerous or unhealthy situations for residents.

It is not true that nothing could be changed or renovated, but the owner of the building would need to ask permission at the appropriate preservation society, slowing the process down severely. The exact policies are country dependent. Local historical and political realities need to be considered to preserve heritage.

Historic objects in galleries, museums and archives face the challenge from fine particulates representing an aesthetic issue and an agent of chemical degradation.

== Influential, historical people ==
- Eugène Viollet-le-Duc (1814–1879): French architect who restored Gothic buildings and believed that restoration could improve on the past.
- Ann Pamela Cunningham (1816–1875): influential in saving Mount Vernon (plantation) from demolition and founding the Mount Vernon Ladies' Association, one of the first preservation organisations in the United States (est. 1854).
- John Ruskin (1819–1900): English art critic who established the basic theory of preservation (retention of status quo); was a staunch supporter of chattel slavery.
- Augustus Pitt Rivers (1827–1900): Britain's first Inspector of Ancient Monuments.
- William Morris (1834–1896): English designer and writer who founded the Society for the Protection of Ancient Buildings.
- John Lubbock (1834–1913): campaigned for legal protection for ancient monuments and saved Avebury from destruction at the hand of its private owners.
- Camillo Boito (1836–1914): Italian architect who tried to reconcile the conflicting views of Viollet-le-Duc and Ruskin, inspiring modern legislation on restoration in several countries
- Victor de Stuers (1843–1916): Dutch art historian, lawyer, civil servant and politician. First legal secretary at the Ministry of Home Affairs as chief of the brand new Department of Arts and Sciences.
- George Curzon (1859–1925): British Viceroy of India who preserved Tattershall Castle, Lincolnshire and was an influential sponsor of the Ancient Monuments Consolidation and Amendment Act 1913.
- Okakura Kakuzō (1863–1913): Opposed the haibutsu kishaku practice of destruction of temples, helped draft Japan's 1897 Law for the Preservation of Temples and Shrines and worked to repair damaged Buddhist temples, images and texts.
- Madam C.J. Walker (1867–1919): gave the single largest contribution for the preservation of the Frederick Douglass home.
- William Sumner Appleton (1874–1947): Founder of the Society for the Preservation of New England Antiquities (now Historic New England) in 1910, and widely considered as the U.S.'s first professional preservationist. Was a eugenicist that promoted historic preservation as a way of showing that northern European-derived culture was superior to the culture of other racial and ethnic groups.
- Mary McLeod Bethune (1875–1955): involved in many efforts to preserve Afro-American historic sites, established an archive on Afro-American women's history, and provided funds to key organizations with similar goals.
- Walter Muir Whitehill (1905-1978): Chairman of the Whitehill Report in the late 1960s, which established the first guidelines for higher education historic preservation programs.
- Charles E. Peterson (1906–2004): considered to be the "founding father" of historic preservation in the United States.
- James Marston Fitch (1909–2000): educator, author, critic and design practitioner made a major contribution to the philosophical basis of the modern preservation movement and trained and inspired generations of preservationists.
- William J. Murtagh (1923–2018): first Keeper of the National Register of Historic Places in the United States and significant contributor to the literature of the discipline.
- Lee H. Nelson (1927–1994): worked at the National Park Service's Historic American Buildings Survey and helped to formulate national policies on historic preservation.
- Richard Nickel (1928–1972): American preservationist who saved architectural elements from Louis Sullivan buildings.
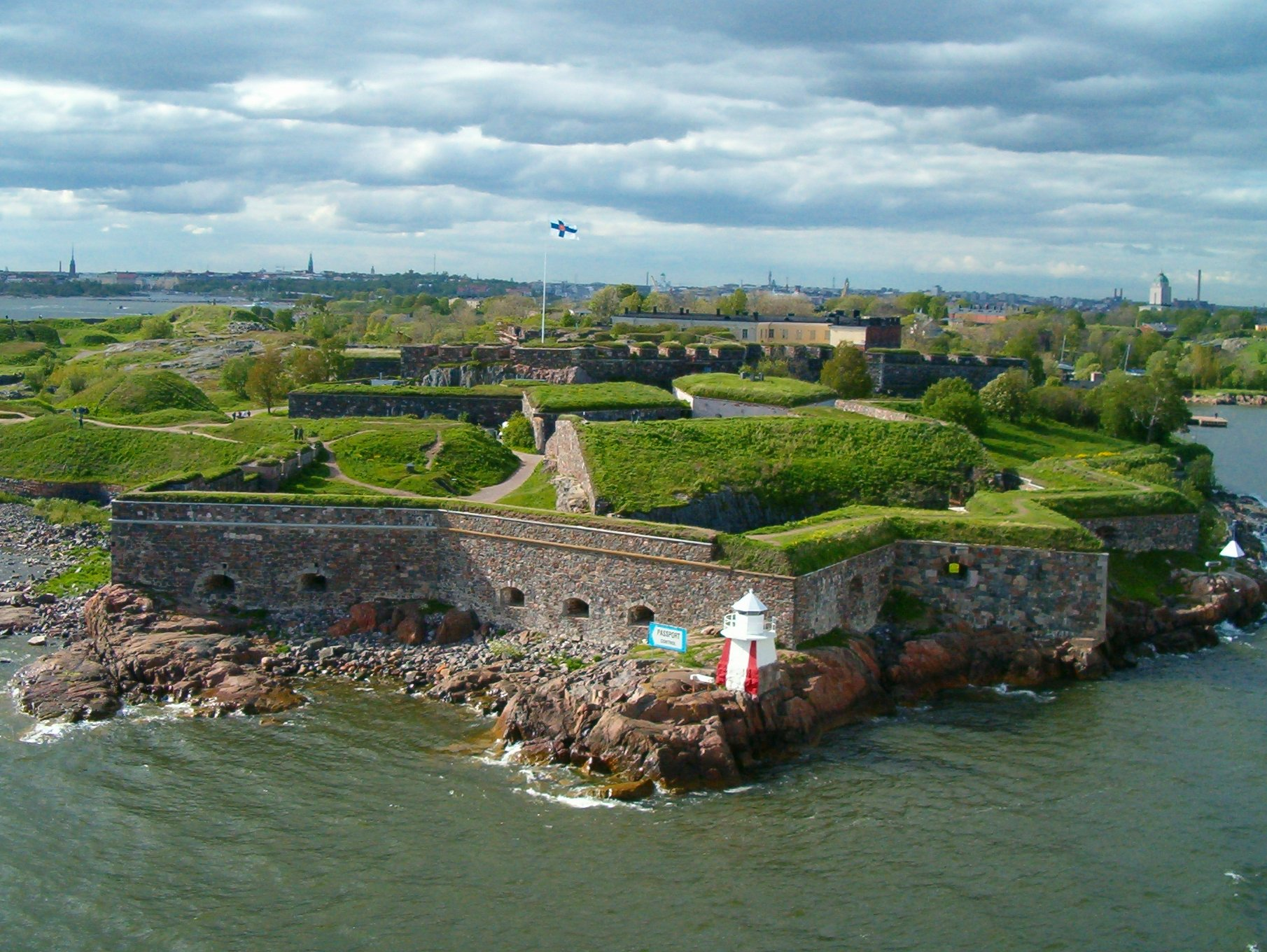
  The Fortress of Suomenlinna from 18th century in Helsinki, Finland, is a UNESCO World Heritage site since 1991.

== Professional and government organisations ==
Several non-government and government organisations focus wholly or partly on built heritage conservation. Some may act as professional bodies, charities, or campaigns; or combine these roles:

=== Worldwide focus ===
- Aga Khan Trust for Culture
- Arcadia Fund
- Blue Shield International cooperates with United Nations peacekeeping to ensure the sustainable existence of cultural assets.
- International Centre for the Study of the Preservation and Restoration of Cultural Property
- International Council on Monuments and Sites issues international guidelines for the treatment of historic buildings and places
- International National Trusts Organisation
- Society of Architectural Historians
- The International Committee for the Conservation of the Industrial Heritage
- UNESCO
- World Monuments Fund

=== Africa ===
- Heritage Western Cape

=== Americas ===
- Advisory Council on Historic Preservation is responsible for implementing the regulations for Section 106 review in the US.
- American Institute for Conservation
- American Institute of Architects
- American Planning Association
- Heritage Montréal
- Heritage Winnipeg Corporation
- HistoriCorps, US
- Instituto Hondureño de Antropología e Historia
- Instituto Nacional de Antropología e Historia, Mexico
- Latinos in Heritage Conservation
- Parks Canada
- Society for American Archaeology
- State Historic Preservation Office, government function of US states

=== Asia ===
- Agency for Cultural Affairs, Japan
- Archaeological Survey of India
- Korea Heritage Service

=== Europe ===
- Cadw, Wales
- Centre des monuments nationaux, France
- Deutsche Stiftung Denkmalschutz
- English Heritage
- Europa Nostra
- Fondation Mérimée, France
- Hispania Nostra
- Historic England is an executive non-departmental public body of the British Government sponsored by the Department for Digital, Culture, Media and Sport. It is tasked with protecting the historic environment of England by preserving and listing historic buildings, scheduling ancient monuments, registering historic Parks and Gardens and by advising central and local government.
- Historic Scotland
- Istituto centrale per il restauro, Italy
- Italia Nostra
- Landmark Trust, UK
- National Trust and National Trust for Scotland, UK
- Society for the Protection of Ancient Buildings, UK
- Union Rempart, France

=== Oceania ===
- Australian Heritage Council
- Heritage New Zealand Pouhere Taonga
- National Trust of Queensland

== See also ==
- Adaptive reuse
- Architectural conservation
- Building restoration
- Cultural heritage management
- Cultural resources management
- Historic garden conservation
- List of historic houses
- Ship of Theseus, philosophical question about preservation
- Space archaeology
- Sustainable preservation
- wabi-sabi and kintsugi

Standards and guidelines

- Athens Charter, doctrinal text
- Barcelona Charter, doctrinal text
- Principles of Intelligent Urbanism
- Venice Charter, doctrinal text

Categories

- Category:Demolished buildings and structures
- Category:Heritage organizations
- Category:Historic preservation organizations

== Bibliography ==
- Avrami, Erica (2020). Preservation and Social Inclusion. New York: Columbia University Press.
- Avrami, E., Leo, C.-N., & Sanchez, A. S. (2018). "Confronting Exclusion; Redefining the Intended Outcomes of Historic Preservation." Change Over Time, Vol. 8, No. 1.: 102–120.
- Birtchnell, Percy (1988). Short History of Berkhamsted. Berkhamsted: Book Stack. ISBN 978-187137200-7.
- Bruce, Catherine Fleming. (2019). The Sustainers: Being, Building, and Doing Good through Activism in the Sacred Spaces of Civil Rights, Human Rights and Social Movements (2nd ed.). TNOVSA/Quality Books. ISBN 978-0996219068.
- Carughi, Ugo, and Visone, Massimo. Time Frames: Conservation Policies for Twentieth-Century Architectural Heritage. New York-London: Routledge, 2017, ISBN 9781472489296.
- Cobb, John Wolstenholme (1883). Two Lectures on the History and Antiquities of Berkhamsted. London: Nichols & Sons.
- Fitch, James Marston (1990). Historic Preservation: Curatorial Management of the Built World. University Press of Virginia.
- Kaufman, Ned (2009). Place, Race, and Story; Essays on the Past and Future of Historic Preservation. Routledge.
- King, Thomas (2009). Our Unprotected Heritage: Whitewashing the Destruction of Our Cultural and Natural Resources. Left Coast Press.
- McLean, Kenyatta. (2020). Reclaiming Time and Space: Bringing Historical Preservation into the Future. Master's thesis, MIT.
- Muñoz Viñas, Salvador (2005). Contemporary Theory of Conservation. Amsterdam: Elsevier/Butterworth Heinemann.
- Page, Max & Randall Mason (eds.). Giving Preservation a History. New York: Routledge, 2004.
- Price, Nicholas Stanley et al. (eds.). Historical and Philosophical Issues in the Conservation of Cultural Heritage. Los Angeles: The Getty Conservation Institute, 1996.
- Roberts, A. R. (2020). "The End of Bootstraps and Good Masters: Fostering Social Inclusion by Creating Counternarratives." In E. Avrami (Ed.), Preservation and Social Inclusion (pp. 109–122). Columbia University Press.
- Ruskin, John. The Seven Lamps of Architecture. New York: Dover Publications, 1989. Originally published, 1880. Important for preservation theory introduced in the section, "The Lamp of Memory."
- Sherwood, Jennifer (2008). "Influences on the Growth of Medieval and Early Modern Berkhamsted". In Wheeler, Michael (ed.). A County of Small Towns: the Development of Hertfordshire's Urban Landscape to 1800. Hatfield, UK: Hertfordshire.
- Stipe, Robert E. (ed.). A Richer Heritage: Historic Preservation in the Twenty-First Century. Chapel Hill, NC: The University of North Carolina Press, 2003.
- Tyler, Norman, Ted J. Ligibel, and Ilene R. Tyler. Historic Preservation: An Introduction to its History, Principles, and Practice. New York: W.W. Norton & Company, 2018.
- Viollet-le-Duc, Eugène Emmanuel. The Foundations of Architecture; Selections from the Dictionnaire Raisonné. New York: George Braziller, 1990. Originally published, 1854. Important for its introduction of restoration theory.
- Wells, Jeremy. (2021). "10 Ways Historic Preservation Policy Supports White Supremacy and 10 Ideas to End It." University of Maryland faculty papers.
