= James Marston Fitch =

American architect (1909–2000)

James Marston Fitch (1909–2000) was an American architect and a Preservationist. In 1964, he was one of the founders of the Historic Preservation Program at Columbia University's Graduate School of Architecture, Planning and Preservation. He was a member of the faculty there from 1954 to 1977, and received an honorary Litt.D. in 1980. The School has established a lecture series in his honor and endowed a named professorship, previously held by Andrew Dolkart and currently held by Erica Avrami.

The ACSA (Association of Collegiate Schools of Architecture) honored Fitch with the ACSA Distinguished Professor Award in 1985–86.

After leaving the Columbia faculty, he became director of historic preservation at the private architecture and planning firm, Beyer Blinder Belle. He led the fight that prevented the construction of an expressway through SoHo, to save the buildings at what is now the South Street Seaport. In the 1990s, he supervised the renovation of Grand Central Terminal.

The James Marston Fitch Foundation, established in his honor in 1988, awards $25,000-dollar research grants for historic preservation.

The activist Jane Jacobs considered that Fitch "was the principal character in making the preservation of historic buildings practical and feasible and popular." Dr. Fitch was awarded the Historic Districts Council's 1998 Landmarks Lion award in recognition of his lifetime of contributions to the historic preservation movement in New York City and beyond.

== Publications ==
- American Building: The Environmental Forces that Shape It (1947, updated 1999)
- Historic Preservation: Curatorial Management of the Built World (1982).

== See also ==
- Historic Preservation
