= Andrea R. Roberts =

- Born: Sugarland, Texas
- Occupations: Educator, researcher, college professor, historian
- Website: https://andrearobertsphd.com

Andrea R. Roberts is an American educator, researcher, college professor, guest speaker, and planning historian, who is an associate professor in the Department of Urban and Environmental Planning for cultural planning at the University of Virginia. Her research centers around intentional communities built by Black people. She is Co-director Center for Cultural Landscapes at the University of Virginia. She founded The Texas Freedom Colonies Project in 2014. Her work centers around unrecorded histories and endangered historic black settlements, towns known also as freedom colonies founded in 1866–1930. Roberts is a 6th generation Texan. Her ancestors were enslaved Africans that founded freedom colonies.

== Education ==
In 2016, Roberts received a Ph.D. in community and regional urban planning from the University of Texas at Austin. In 2006, she received a M.A. in government administration and public finance from the University of Pennsylvania. In 1996, received a B.A. in political science from Vassar College. Roberts is a Mellon Initiative in Urban Landscape Studies Advisory Board member at Dumbarton Oaks. This year, Chair Bronin invited her to join the Advisory Council on Historic Preservation's Experts Advisory Committee, charged with strengthening “bridges between the federal government and the research community.” This spring, she was a Visiting Scholar in Garden and Landscape Studies at Dumbarton Oaks.

== Career ==
Roberts' work focusses on African American identity, heritage, community development, and historic preservation. In 2014, Roberts founded the Texas Freedom Colonies Project. The project documents African American colonies also known as settlements that developed after emancipation. The project's initiative is to protect endangered African American history and to educate the public. The project has an atlas that maps Texas Freedom Colonies.

In 2016–17 she was Emerging Scholar Fellow in Race and Gender in the Built Environment of the American City, at Austin, Texas' School of Architecture. Roberts is an author who has written numerous articles about African American settlements.
