= Joseph Parisi =

Joseph Parisi may refer to:

- Joe Parisi (Joseph T. Parisi), Wisconsin politician, Dane County Executive
- Joseph Parisi, a party in Parisi v. Davidson, United States Supreme Court case
- Joseph Parisi (editor), former editor of Poetry
- Joseph E. Parisi (1913–1990), New York state senator
