= Torre dei Conti =

Fortified medieval tower in Rome, Italy

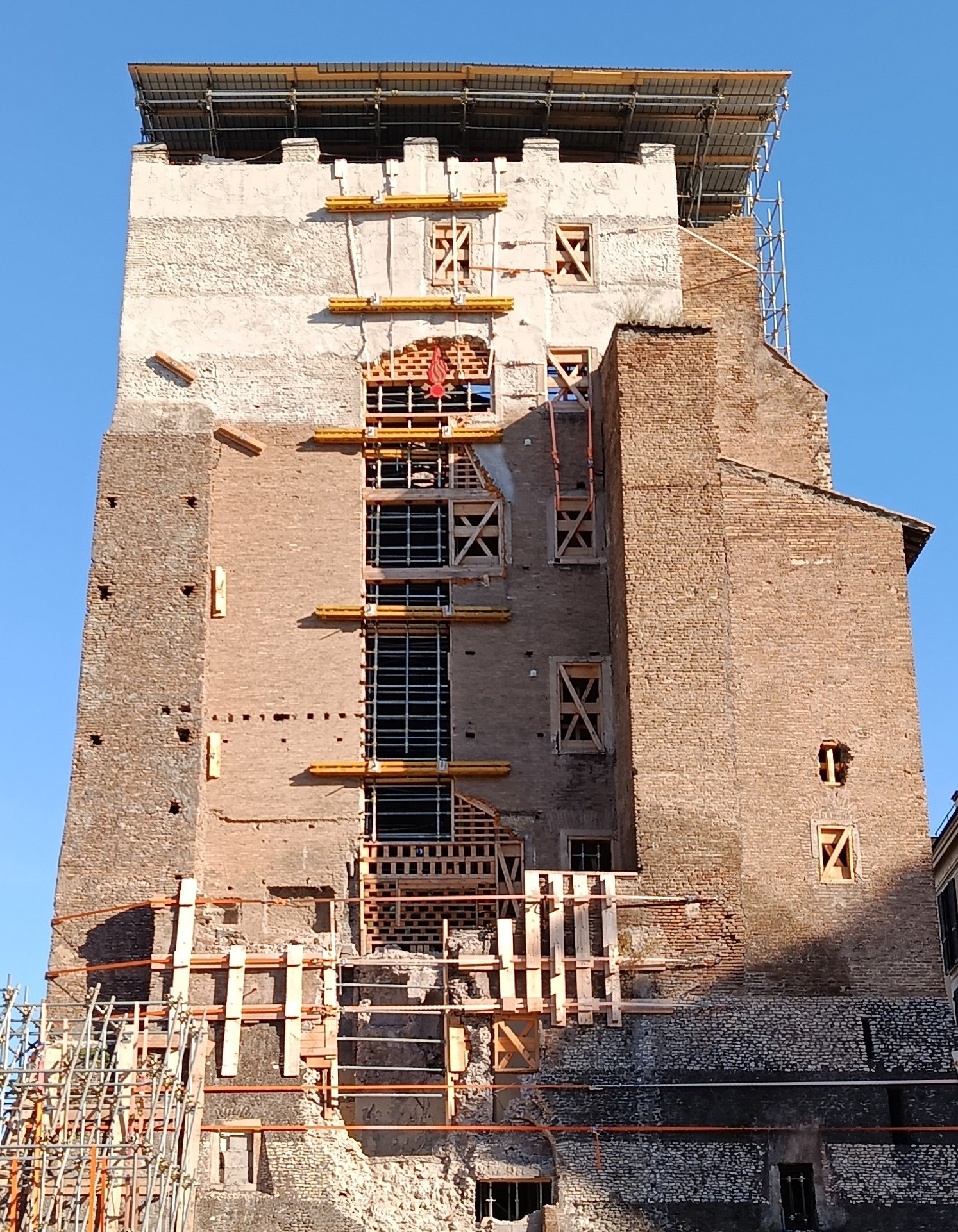
- Pictured in 2026 with staging and reinforcements added following the tower's 2025 partial collapse
- Click on the map for a fullscreen view
- 41°53′37″N 12°29′17″E

History
- Built: 9th century
- Built by: Counts of Segni

Site notes
- Condition: Visible structural damage; closed to public

The Torre dei Conti is a medieval fortified tower in Rome, Italy, located near the Colosseum and the Roman Forum.

== Description ==
Now standing at 29 metres (95 ft), it was once 50–60 metres (160–200 ft) tall, and gained the nickname of Torre Maggiore (Major Tower) for its size. Originally covered in travertine salvaged from the ruins of the Imperial Fora, this covering was in turn stripped for use in the construction of the Porta Pia in the 16th century, designed by Michelangelo.

== History ==
The initial construction took place under the pontificate of Nicholas I, in the mid-ninth century. The tower's main phase of construction was by the architect Marchione d'Arezzo in 1238. It was commissioned by Ricardo Conti, brother of Pope Innocent III as a fortified residence for his family, the Conti di Segni, over one of the exedrae of the portico of the four apses of the Imperial fora (The Temple of Peace) near the Forum of Nerva. It stood on the border with the territory of the rival family of the Frangipani.

The upper floors were destroyed by a series of earthquakes culminating in that of 1348, after which it was abandoned until 1620, when it was rebuilt by the Apostolic Camera. Other earthquakes in 1630 and 1644 caused damage which was repaired at the end of the 17th century by Pope Alexander VIII, who added two buttresses.

With the opening of the Via Cavour in the 19th century and the Via dei Fori Imperiali in the early 20th century, the tower was left isolated from other buildings. In 1937, the tower was donated by Benito Mussolini to the Arditi (Italian stormtroopers), which retained ownership until 1943. The tower contains the mausoleum of General Alessandro Parisi, a leader of the Arditi who died in an automobile accident in 1938 and whose remains are preserved there in an ancient Roman sarcophagus.

The tower was used until 2006 to host city hall offices and was left derelict until 2022, when renovations to make the building a museum covering the recent phases of the Imperial Fora began.

== Collapse ==
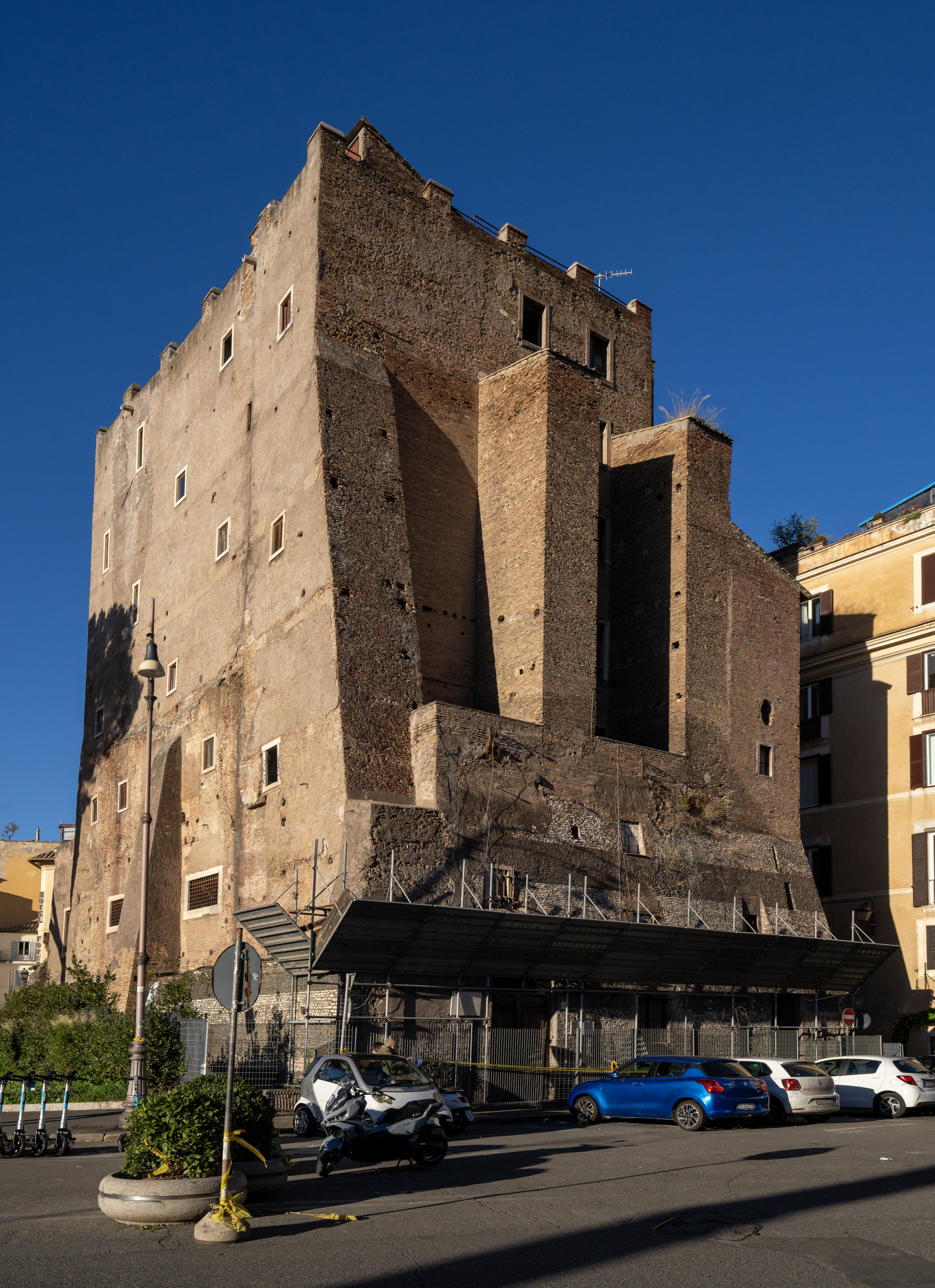
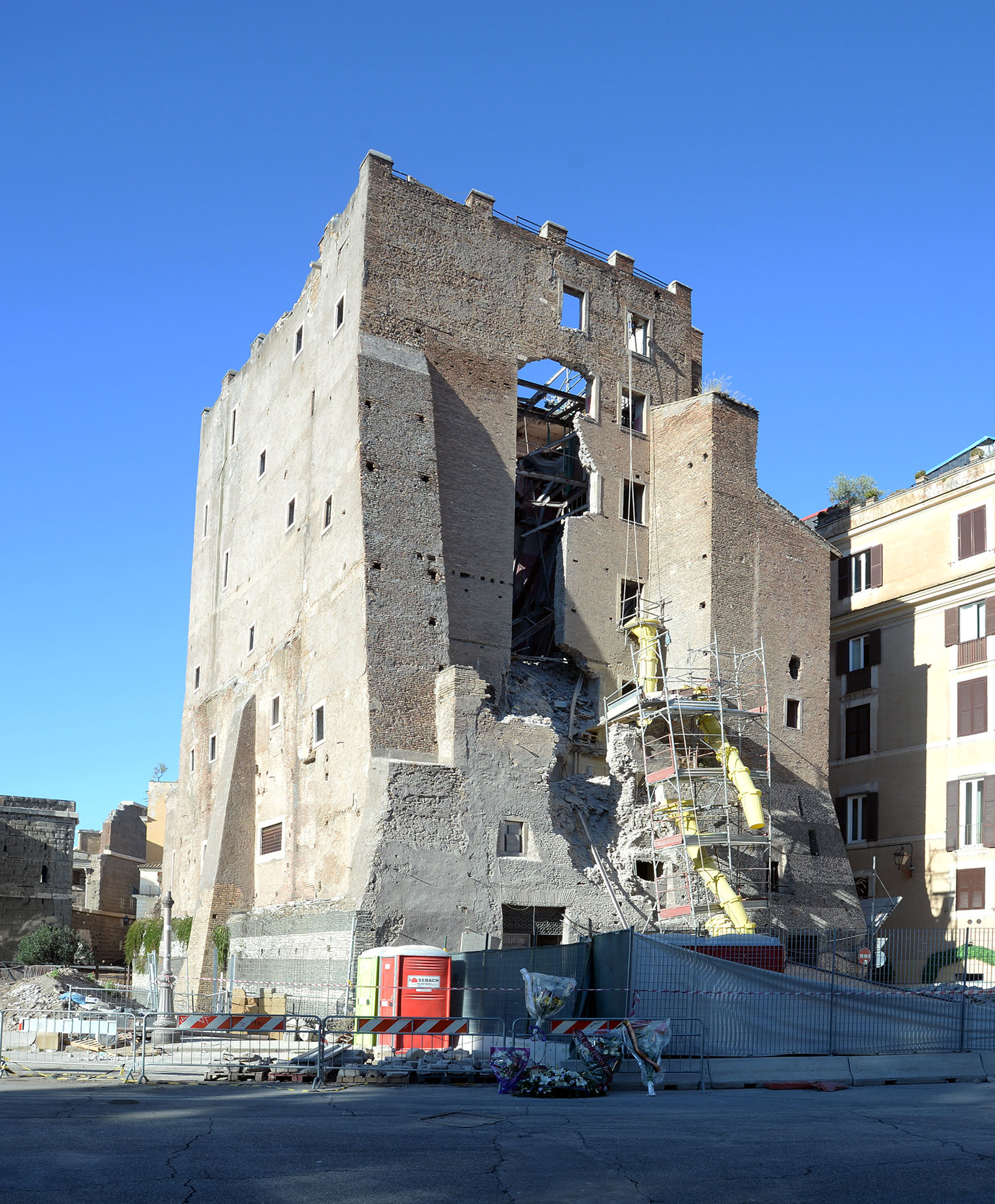
Before and after the tower's partial collapse in November 2025

On 3 November 2025, the tower partially collapsed during renovation works. Two separate collapses occurred within 90 minutes of each other, leaving the tower with significant internal damage. One of the Romanian workers was killed and another was injured.

== See also ==
- Torre delle Milizie – Historical site in Rome, Italy

== Sources ==
- Cusanno, Anna Maria (1995). Il restauro e l'isolamento della Torre dei Conti in Gli anni del Governatorato (1926–1944). Rome: Edizioni Kappa. pp. 125–130. ISBN 88-7890-181-4.
- Gregorovius, Ferdinand (2010) [First published 1854]. History of the City of Rome in the Middle Ages. UK: Cambridge University Press. p. 667. ISBN 978-1108015066.

Preceded by Column of the Immaculate Conception, Rome	Landmarks of Rome; Torre dei Conti	Succeeded by Ospedale di Santo Spirito in Sassia
