= Melissa Parisi =

American geneticist and physician

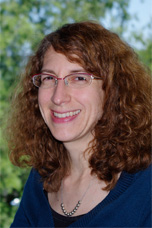
- Education: Stanford University (M.D., Ph.D)
- Scientific career
- Workplaces: University of Washington; National Institute of Child Health & Human Development

Melissa A. Parisi is an American geneticist and physician. She is chief of the Intellectual and Developmental Disabilities Branch at the National Institute of Child Health & Human Development.

== Education ==
Parisi earned medical and doctorate degrees in developmental biology from Stanford University, where her research focused on mitochondrial transcription. She completed a pediatric residency at the University of Washington, followed by fellowship training in medical genetics.

== Career ==
Parisi was an assistant professor in the Department of Pediatrics at the University of Washington and Seattle Children's Hospital, where she was active as a clinical geneticist and as a researcher in the field of congenital malformations of the human hindbrain, specifically Joubert syndrome and related disorders. In her clinical practice in Washington and Alaska, Parisi was involved in the evaluation, diagnosis, and management of children and adults with genetic syndromes, chromosomal disorders, and developmental disabilities. Parisi also served as chair of the scientific advisory board of the Joubert Syndrome and Related Disorders Foundation.

Parisi joined the Eunice Kennedy Shriver National Institute of Child Health and Human Development (NICHD) in October 2008. She is chief of the NICHD Intellectual and Developmental Disabilities Branch. She currently oversees Intellectual and Developmental Disabilities Research Centers. She is interested in advancing basic, clinical, and translational research that will improve the lives of individuals with developmental disabilities.
