= Alessandro Parisi (footballer, born 1988) =

Italian footballer

Personal information
- Date of birth: 21 September 1988 (age 38)
- Place of birth: Naples, Italy
- Position: Goalkeeper

Team information
- Current team: Catanzaro

Senior career*
Years	Team	Apps	(Gls)
2007–2008	Savoia	5	(0)
Nov 2007	Sopron	4	(0)
2008–	Catanzaro	?	(?)
- * Club domestic league appearances and goals

Alessandro Parisi (born 21 September 1988) is an Italian footballer who plays as a goalkeeper. He plays for Italian Lega Pro Seconda Divisione team Catanzaro.
