= Alessandro Parisi (politician) =

Italian soldier, industrialist, and Fascist politician

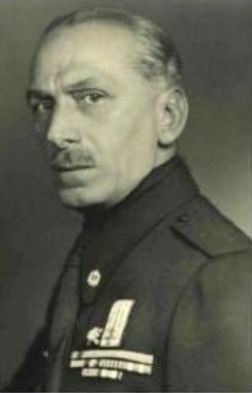

Deputy of the Chamber of Deputies of the Kingdom of Italy
- In office 1934 – 4 August 1938

President of the National Federation of Arditi of Italy
- In office 1919 – 4 August 1938
- Preceded by: Position established

Personal details
- Born: February 24, 1882 Palermo, Kingdom of Italy
- Died: August 4, 1938 (aged 56) Recanati, Kingdom of Italy
- Cause of death: Automobile accident
- Resting place: Crypt at Torre dei Conti, Rome
- Party: National Fascist Party
- Education: Law degree (University of Rome, 1913)
- Occupation: Politician, industrialist, soldier
- Awards: 3 × Silver Medal of Military Valor; Military Order of Savoy

Military service
- Allegiance: Kingdom of Italy
- Branch/service: Royal Italian Army
- Battles/wars: World War I (Italian Front); Pacification of Libya (1919); Second Italo-Ethiopian War (1936); Spanish Civil War

Alessandro Parisi (24 February 1882 – 4 August 1938) was an Italian soldier, industrialist, and Fascist politician. A decorated veteran of World War I, he served as the president of the National Federation of Arditi of Italy (FNAI) and was a deputy in the Italian parliament. He was an early member of the National Fascist Party, described in a contemporary obituary as a "blackshirt of the first hour" (founding member of Blackshirts). He was mentioned as a carrier of "Ardito spirit" alongside Giuseppe Bottai, Italo Balbo, and Cesare Maria De Vecchi.

As the head of the Saverio Parisi firm, he oversaw the construction of major public works for the Fascist regime, including the Stadio Mussolini in Turin and the Aeroporto del Littorio in Rome.

Following his death in a car crash in 1938, Parisi was given a high-profile state burial, personally ordered by Benito Mussolini. His remains were interred in an ancient Roman strigillated sarcophagus, which had been a gift to Mussolini from the Barberini family, and placed in a mausoleum created in the Torre dei Conti in Rome.

== Early life ==
Parisi was born in Palermo on 24 February 1882. He moved to Rome for his education, graduating with a law degree from the University of Rome in 1913.

== Military career ==
Parisi became a lieutenant in Nizza Cavalleria in 1913.

=== World War I ===
Parisi served as an officer in the Royal Italian Army during World War I. According to a 1939 hagiographic profile, he was wounded in May 1915 while on public order duty in Rome but returned to service in June. He first fought, as a machine gunner, on the Karst Plateau, where he received two solemn commendations and a promotion for war merit. He later commanded a machine gun company at the battle on Banjšice Plateau and a Fiamme Rosse (Red Flames) Arditi battalion during the retreat from Caporetto.

For his actions in the second Battle of Melette in December 1917, he was awarded three Silver Medals of Military Valor. At the war's end, he commanded the 10th Assault Unit (X Reparto d'assalto) during the Battle of Vittorio Veneto. His unit was reportedly among the first to cross the Piave, a feat for which he was awarded the Military Order of Savoy.

=== Post-war conflicts ===
Parisi's military activity continued after 1918. He fought in Libya with an assault division in 1919. He later volunteered for the Second Italo-Ethiopian War in 1936 and subsequently served as a "legionary" in the Spanish Civil War.

== Political and industrial career ==
=== Fascist politics ===
He was a Camicia Nera della prima ora ("blackshirt of the first hour"), indicating his involvement in the post-war Fascist street-fighting movement. He officially joined the National Fascist Party (PNF) in 1921, with his seniority backdated to 1919. He was later elected as a PNF deputy to the Italian parliament. During his time in the Chamber, Parisi's experience in the area of finance and credit led to his membership in the parliamentary commission for the reform of financial laws (Commissione parlamentare per la riforma delle leggi finanziarie).

Parisi was a central figure for the Arditi veterans. He served as the President of the National Federation of Arditi of Italy (Federazione Nazionale Arditi d'Italia, or FNAI). A 1938 obituary claimed he was the association's founding president in 1919.

=== Industrial projects ===
Parisi was the Procuratore Generale (General Manager) of the Saverio Parisi firm, a large industrial and banking company. He headed the firm's public works division, which, according to contemporary Fascist-era sources, oversaw the construction of numerous major state projects:

- The Stadio Mussolini (now Stadio Olimpico Grande Torino) in Turin.
- The Aeroporto del Littorio (now Rome-Urbe Airport) in Rome.
- The Firenze-Viareggio autostrada (highway).
- The first Italian radio transmitter and receiver station at Ciampino.
- Military fortifications on Italy's borders.
- Land reclamation projects in Tombolo, Paestum, and Calabria.
- New Navicelli channel between Pisa and Livorno.

He also founded the "Società Benit" for gasoline production, which built a cracking plant in Naples.

== Death and burial ==
Parisi died on 4 August 1938 in the hospital at Recanati, following a severe automobile accident that occurred near Porto Recanati.

In 1937, the medieval Torre dei Conti in Rome had been restored and inaugurated as the national headquarters of the Arditi Federation (FNAI), which Parisi led. Following Parisi's death, Benito Mussolini personally ordered that Parisi's remains be interred in the tower's crypt, a space which had been designated for the cult of fallen soldiers.

His remains were placed in an ancient Roman strigillated sarcophagus. The sarcophagus itself was a gift to Mussolini from the Barberini family. According to historian Sylvia Diebner, the tomb was decorated with a "complex symbolic setup" linking the Arditi to the Savoy Monarchy and the city of Rome. The reuse of an antique sarcophagus for a modern political figure was described by scholars as "apparently unparalleled" and a significant act meant to evoke the Fascist ideal of Romanità (Roman-ness). The mausoleum solidified the tower's status as a symbolic landmark along the Via dell'Impero.

== Sources ==
- "Alessandro Parisi". Portale storico della Camera dei deputati (in Italian). Camera dei deputati.
- "Commemorazioni" [Commemorations] (PDF). Atti Parlamentari. Discussioni [Parliamentary Acts. Discussions] (PDF). Legislatura XXIX, 1ª Sessione (in Italian). Camera dei Deputati. 1 December 1938. pp. 5237–5238.
- "Documenti dell' Agosto XVI: Morte del presidente degli Arditi" [Documents of August Year 16: Death of the President of the Arditi]. Annali del fascismo (in Italian) (8): 25. August 1938.
- "Dalla pregevole Rivista di Giurisprudenza e Dottrina Bancaria" [From the esteemed Journal of Banking Jurisprudence and Doctrine]. La proprieta edilizià italiana [Italian Building Ownership] (in Italian). 17–18. Casa editrice del "Libro italiano": 165–166. 1939.
- Colombini, P. A. (1939). Alessandro Parisi: comandante dei Reparti Arditi d'Italia [Alessandro Parisi: commander of the Italian Arditi Units] (in Italian). M. Sejmand.
- Diebner, Sylvia (2012). "La Torre dei Conti negli anni del Governatorato (1926-1944)" [The Torre dei Conti in the years of the Governatorate (1926-1944)]. Ricerche di storia dell'arte (in Italian) (3): 85–90. doi:10.7374/73321. ISSN 0392-7202.
- Huskinson, Janet (2015). "The Reuse of Strigillated Sarcophagi in Historical Contexts". Roman Strigillated Sarcophagi: Art and Social History. Oxford University Press. p. 272.
- Svanoni, Gino (1938). Mussolini e gli Arditi (in Italian). Milan: Casa Editrice Carnaro.
